= Mackenzie of Gairloch =

Noble Scottish family

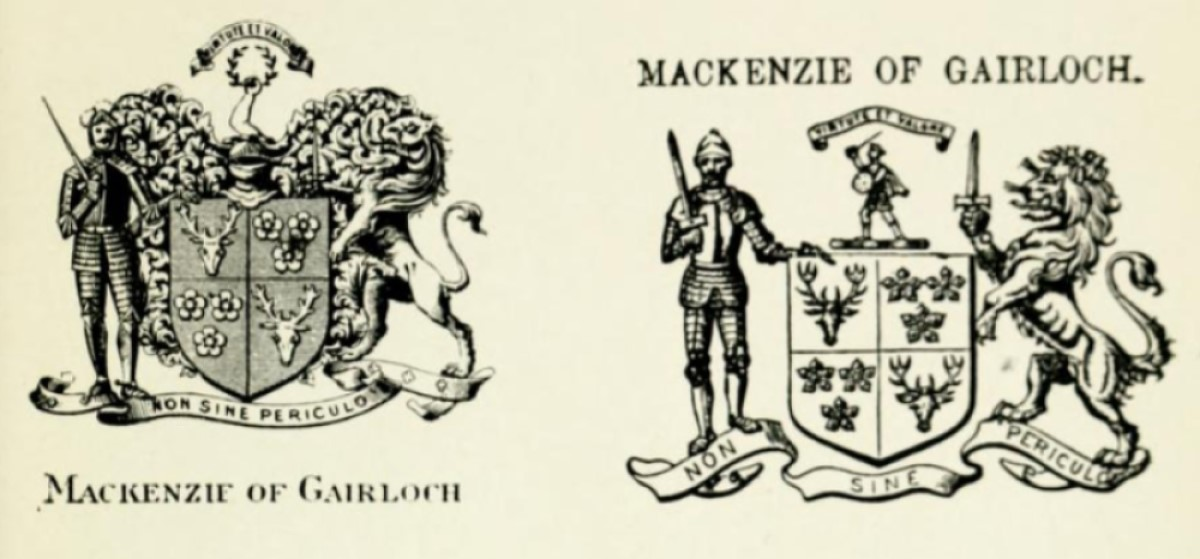
Mackenzie of Gairloch coats of arms

The Mackenzies of Gairloch were a minor noble Scottish family and one of the senior cadet branches of the Clan Mackenzie, a Scottish clan of the Scottish Highlands.

== Hector Roy Mackenzie, I of Gairloch ==
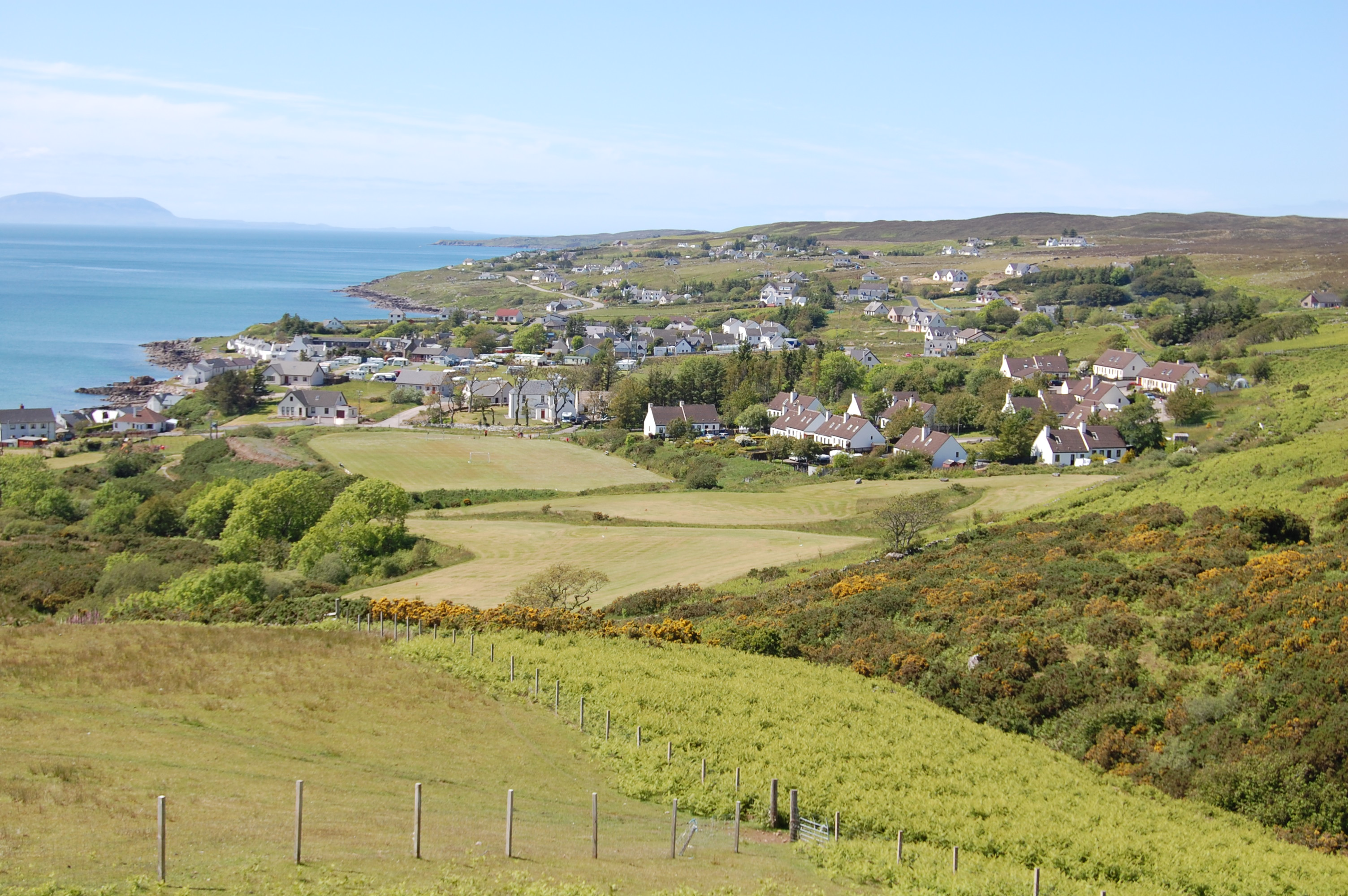
The village of Gairloch

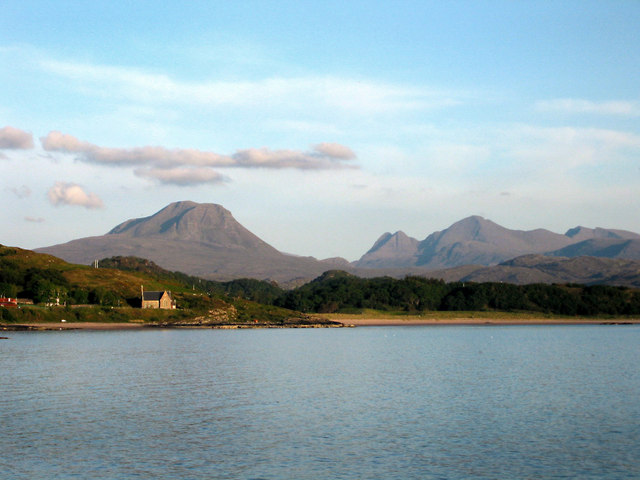
Backdrop to Gairloch

Hector Roy Mackenzie, 1st of Gairloch was the third son of Alexander Mackenzie, 6th of Kintail, possibly from his second marriage to a daughter of Macdonald of Morar who was a cadet of the Clan Macdonald of Clanranald.

Although the Mackenzies of Hilton are the senior cadets of the clan because they descend from the second eldest son of the first proven chief Alexander Mackenzie, 6th of Kintail, the Mackenzies of Gairloch who descend from the third eldest son became guardians of Kenneth Mackenzie, 8th of Kintail because the first Mackenzie of Hilton had pre-deceased his elder brother, Kenneth Mackenzie, 7th of Kintail.

Hector Roy Mackenzie led the Clan Mackenzie on the Royalist side at the Battle of Sauchieburn in 1488. The Crown granted to Hector a commission of fire and sword to take the lands of Gairloch from the Clan MacLeod of Raasay who had murdered Hector's nephews. Hector's legal ownership of Gairloch is confirmed by a deed made by John De Vaux, Sheriff of Inverness, dated 10 December 1494, and his ownership of Brahan and Moy by a precept issued by the King on 5 March 1508.

Hector feuded with the Clan Munro which resulted in the alleged Battle of Drumchatt (1501) in which the Mackenzie chronicles have claimed victory. Hector also feuded with his nephew John Mackenzie of Killin over the chiefship of the clan in which John was ultimately successful. In 1513, Hector and John together led the clan against the English at the Battle of Flodden where both escaped but many of their followers were killed.

Hector Roy married a daughter of the Laird of Grant - probably Sir Duncan, who flourished from 1434 to 1485 - but she died before the marriage was solemnised. He had one son by her:

1. Hector Cam Mackenzie, he being blind of an eye, and who was given Achterneed and Castle Leod, as his patrimony. Hector Cam married a daughter of Angus Roy Mackay, 9th of Strathnaver, by whom he had two sons Alexander Roy and Murdo.

Hector married secondly his cousin Anne, daughter of Ranald MacRanald, generally known as Ranald Ban Macdonald of Moidart and Clanranald. Anne had previously been married to MacLeod chief William Dubh MacLeod of the Clan MacLeod of Harris and Dunvegan Castle. Hector Roy and Anne had four sons and three daughters:

1. John "Glassich" Mackenzie, 2nd of Gairloch.
2. Kenneth Mackenzie.
3. John "Tuach" Mackenzie.
4. Dougal Roy Mackenzie.
5. Three daughters who married respectively, Bayne of Tulloch, John Aberach Mackay,^{[A]} and Hugh Bayne Fraser of Bunchrew, a natural son of Thomas, Lord Lovat, killed at Blar-na-Leine and ancestor of the Frasers of Reelick.

== John "Glassich" Mackenzie, II of Gairloch ==
John "Glassich" Mackenzie, 2nd of Gairloch had his lands forfeited in 1547 for refusing to join the Royal Standard where the Scots had been defeated by the English at the Battle of Pinkie. His estates were officially put in the hands of the Earl of Sutherland but it was difficult for the earl to wield any real power on the Mackenzie of Gairloch estates. In 1551, Mary, Queen of Scots granted a remission to John Mackenzie, 9th of Kintail for violently taking John "Glassich" Mackenzie and his brothers. None of them are described as deceased in the remission but the Mackenzie MS history states that John "Glassich" Mackenzie had been poisoned or starved to death at Eilean Donan Castle in 1550 and so the remission may have served as a means to cover this up. The MacLeods continued to dispute ownership of Gairloch and it is possible that John "Glassich" Mackenzie had been killed in a skirmish with them. He had married Agnes, daughter of James Fraser of Phoineas who was the brother of Hugh Fraser, Lord Lovat. Their children were:

1. Hector Mackenzie, 3rd of Gairloch.
2. Alexander Mackenzie.
3. John Roy Mackenzie, 4th of Gairloch.
4. A daughter who married John Mackenzie of Loggie with issue.

John "Glassich" Mackenzie also had two natural sons before he married, Alexander Roy Mackenzie and Hector Caol Mackenzie.

After this period of feuding over the chiefship between the Mackenzies of Gairloch and the Mackenzies of Kintail, by the end of the 16th century the Clan Mackenzie was a powerful and unified clan under the leadership of Mackenzie of Kintail.

== Hector Mackenzie, III of Gairloch ==
Hector Mackenzie, 3rd of Gairloch received a sasine dated May 6, 1563. Hector was probably killed on September 3, 1566, and was buried at Beauly Priory. His brother Alexander was apparently assassinated a few weeks after succeeding and so is not considered one of the Barons of Gairloch. The next in line was therefore their brother John Roy Mackenzie, 4th of Gairloch.

== John Roy Mackenzie, IV of Gairloch ==
John Roy Mackenzie, 4th of Gairloch was born in 1548. He received his estate from Mary, Queen of Scots in 1567. In 1606, he received a charter that made Gairloch a free barony and in 1619 he received another charter that added Kinkell to his estate. He built the first three stories of the Tower of Kinkell where his arms and those of his first wife are in the great hall. Much feuding and skirmishing took place between the Mackenzies of Gairloch and the MacLeods in this period.

John Roy Mackenzie married first Elizabeth, daughter of Angus MacDonald, 7th chief of the Clan MacDonell of Glengarry and had the following children:

1. John Mackenzie who married Isabel, daughter of Alexander Mackenzie, 2nd of Fairburn. John predeceased his father having died in 1601.
2. Alexander Mackenzie, 5th of Gairloch.
3. Murdoch Mackenzie who was killed skirmishing with the MacLeods in Raasay in 1611.
4. Kenneth Mackenzie, I of Davochcairn, who married twice and left issue. He died in 1643 and is buried at Beauly Priory.
5. Duncan Mackenzie of Sand, who married and left issue, including a son named Alexander who in turn had a son named John who was killed in 1645 at the Battle of Auldearn.
6. William Mackenzie of Shieldaig, who married and left issue.
7. A daughter who married Fraser of Foyers.
8. Katherine Mackenzie, who married Hugh Fraser of Culbokie.
9. Janet Mackenzie, who married first, George Cuthbert of Castlehill, Inverness and second, Neil Munro of Findon.
10. A daughter who married Alistair Mor, brother of Chisholm of Comar.

John Roy Mackenzie married secondly, Isabel, daughter of Murdoch Mackenzie of Fairburn and had the following children:

1. Captain Roderick Mackenzie of Pitglassie, who served in the army of the Prince of Orange and died in Holland in 1624.
2. Hector Mackenzie of Mellan who married twice and left issue.
3. John Mackenzie, a clergyman who married and left issue.
4. Katherine Og Mackenzie, who married Fraser of Belladrum and left issue.
5. Isabel Mackenzie, who married first, Alistair Og MacDonald, brother of Sir Donald MacDonald of Sleat, and secondly Hugh MacDonald of Skirinish.

John Roy Mackenzie died in 1628 aged 80.

== Alexander Mackenzie, V of Gairloch ==
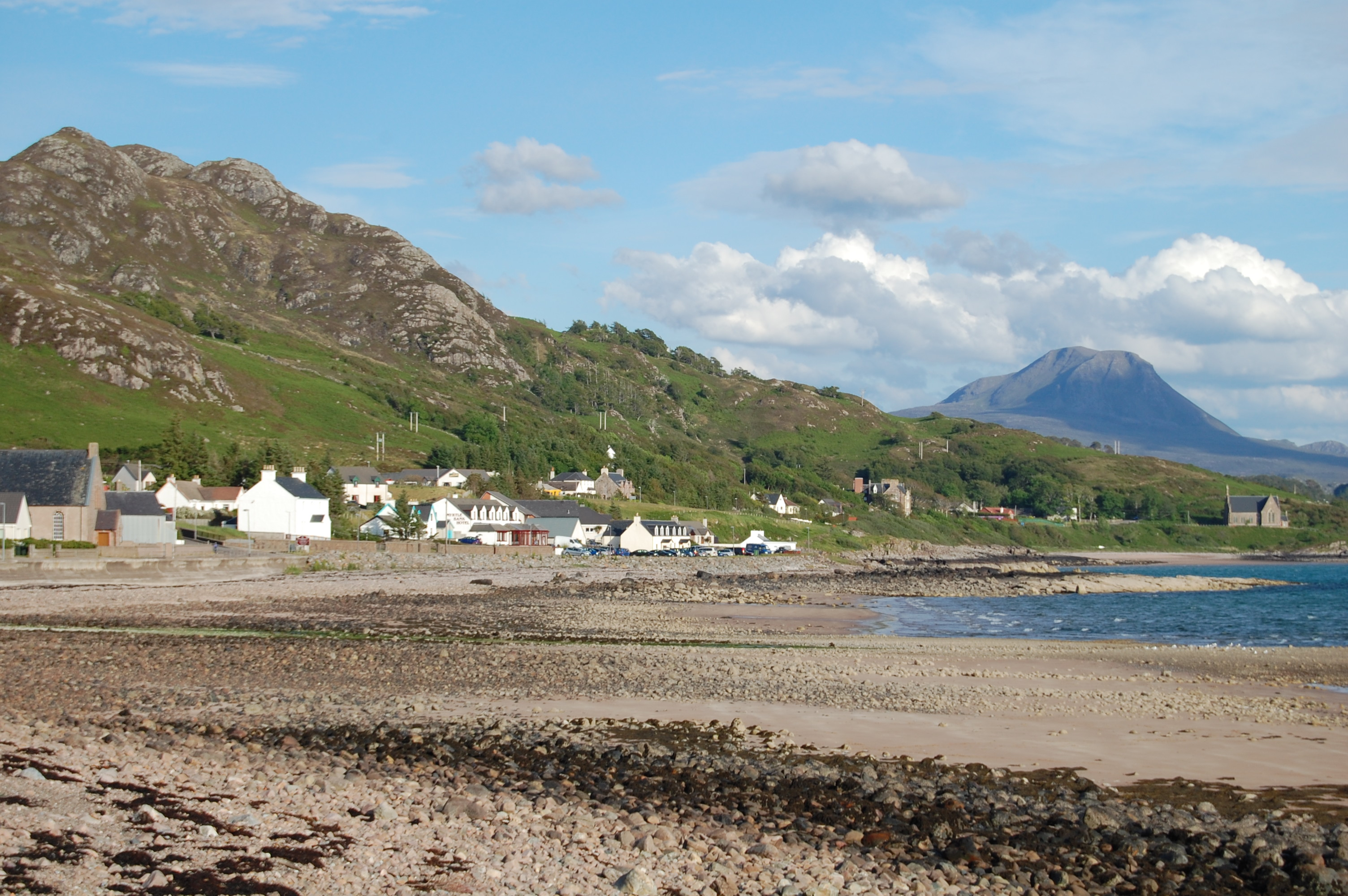
Strath Bay and the village of Gairloch

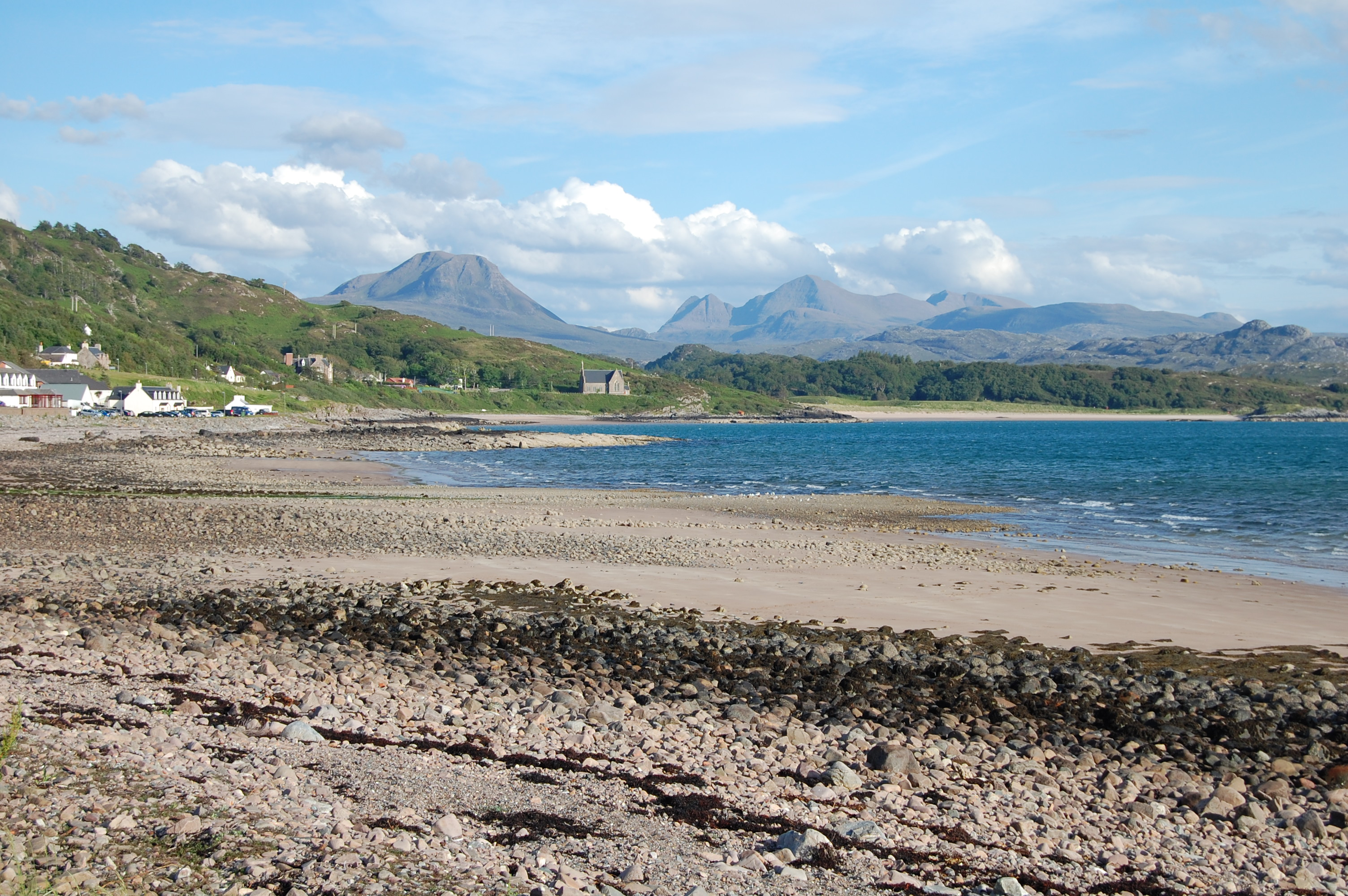
Strath Bay and the village of Gairloch

Alexander Mackenzie, 5th of Gairloch succeeded his father in 1628. He was at an advanced age at the time of his father's death. He had led the Mackenzies in their feud against the MacLeods. The charter that his father had received in 1619 had infeft Alexander Mackenzie as the fiar of the Barony of Gairloch. In 1627, he had obtained from his son-in-law, John Mackenzie of Applecross (later of Loch Slin Castle) part of Dìobaig which had been in dispute. In 1637, Alexander Mackenzie tried to acquire part of Loggie Wester from Duncan Bayne but this was not completed until the time of his successor in 1640.

Alexander Mackenzie married firstly, Margaret, third daughter of Roderick Mor Mackenzie, I of Redcastle, by his wife, Fingula or Florence, daughter of Robert Mor Munro, 15th Baron of Foulis and had the following children:

1. Kenneth Mackenzie, 6th of Gairloch.
2. Murdo Mackenzie of Sand who married with issue.
3. Hector Mackenzie, portioner of Mellan and a Cornet in George Munro, 1st of Newmore's regiment.
4. Alexander Mackenzie, from whom the historian Alexander Mackenzie is descended.
5. Isobel Mackenzie, who married with issue.
6. Margaret Mackenzie, who married with issue.
7. A daughter who married Robert Gray of Skibo Castle.

Alexander Mackenzie married secondly, Isabel, eldest daughter of Alexander Mackenzie of Coul and Applecross and had the following children:

1. William Mackenzie of Multafy and Belmaduthy.
2. Roderick Mackenzie who married Agnes, second daughter of Alexander Mackenzie, I of Suddie.
3. Angus Mackenzie, who married but without issue and fought on the Royalist side at the Battle of Inverkeithing in 1651.
4. Annabella Mackenzie, who married with issue.
5. Janet Mackenzie, who married with issue.
6. A natural daughter, who married without issue.

Alexander Mackenzie died on January 4, 1638, aged 61.

== Kenneth Mackenzie, VI of Gairloch ==
Kenneth Mackenzie, 6th of Gairloch was a strong loyalist during the wars of James Graham, 1st Marquess of Montrose and the Covenanters. He was fined by the Committee of Estates for supporting the king in 1646. He commanded a body of Highlanders under Thomas Mackenzie of Pluscarden at Balveny but when the Royalist army was surprised and disarmed there he was on a visit to Castle Grant and so escaped capture. In 1640 he had completed the purchase of Loggie Wester which had been started by his predecessor. In 1658, Oliver Cromwell appointed him tutor to Hector Mackenzie, lawful son of Alexander Mackenzie, lawful son of Duncan Mackenzie of Sand, Gairloch.

Kenneth Mackenzie married firstly, in 1635, Katherine, daughter of Sir Donald MacDonald, IX of Sleat but without issue. He married secondly, Ann, daughter of Sir John Grant of Grant and had the following children:

1. Alexander Mackenzie, 7th of Gairloch.
2. Hector Mackenzie of Bishop Kinkell, who married with issue.
3. John Mackenzie, who died unmarried.
4. Mary Mackenzie, who married with issue.
5. Barbara Mackenzie, who married with issue.
6. Lillias Mackenzie, who married with issue.

Kenneth Mackenzie married thirdly, Janet, daughter of John Cuthbert of Castlehill and had the following children:

1. Charles Mackenzie of Letterwe.
2. Kenneth Mackenzie who died unmarried.
3. Colin Mackenzie of Mountgerald, who married with issue.
4. Isabella Mackenzie who married with issue.
5. Annabella Mackenzie who married with issue.

Kenneth Mackenzie died in 1669 and was buried in Beauly Priory.

== Alexander Mackenzie, VII of Gairloch ==
Alexander Mackenzie, 7th of Gairloch received a charter confirming that the lands of Loggie Wester were part of the Barony of Gairloch. In 1681 he had his rights to his titles ratified by an act of Parliament. He married firstly, Barbara, daughter of Sir John Mackenzie of Tarbat and had the following children:

1. Kennth Mackenzie, 8th of Gairloch.
2. Isobel Mackenzie, who married with issue.

Alexander Mackenzie married secondly, Janet, daughter of William Mackenzie, I of Belmaduthy and had the following children:

1. Alexander Mackenzie, who died unmarried.
2. William Mackenzie, who married with issue.
3. John Mackenzie, who married with issue.
4. Ann Mackenzie, who married with issue.

Alexander Mackenzie died in December 1694 at the age of 42 and was buried in Gairloch.

== Kenneth Mackenzie, VIII of Gairloch ==
Sir Kenneth Mackenzie, 8th of Gairloch was created a Baronet of Nova Scotia by Anne, Queen of Great Britain on 2 February 1703. He was educated at Oxford and later represented the County of Ross in the Scottish Parliament. He strongly opposed the Acts of Union 1707.

Sir Kenneth Mackenzie married in 1696 to Margaret, daughter of Sir Roderick Mackenzie of Findon and had the following children:

1. Alexander Mackenzie, 9th of Gairloch.
2. George Mackenzie, who became a merchant in Glasgow and died unmarried in 1739.
3. Barbra Mackenzie, who married in 1729 George Beattie, merchant in Montrose, Angus but without issue.
4. Margaret Mackenzie who died young in 1704.
5. Anne Mackenzie, who married without issue.
6. Katharine Mackenzie, who died young.
7. A natural daughter, Margaret Mackenzie, who married.

Sir Kenneth Mackenzie died in December 1703 at the age of 32. About a year later his widow married Bayne of Tulloch.

== Alexander Mackenzie, IX of Gairloch ==
Sir Alexander Mackenzie, 9th of Gairloch and 2nd Baronet was only a child of three and a half years old when his father died. During his minority very large debts were paid off which consequently left him with little education. In 1708, he and his brothers and sisters were taken to Colin Mackenzie of Findon's house who was the factor of their estate and given a basic education by Simon Urquhart. In 1712, they were all at school in Chanonry under Urquhart and where Sir Alexander Mackenzie remained for six years before going to Edinburgh at the age of 18 to complete his education. He returned home in 1730. He kept out of the Jacobite rising of 1745 and afterwards John Mackenzie of Meddat applied to him for aid for the forfeited Jacobite, John Mackenzie, Lord MacLeod. However, Sir Alexander Mackenzie gave him no assistance.

Sir Alexander Mackenzie married in 1730 to Janet, daughter of Sir Roderick Mackenzie, second Baronet and V of Scatwell. They had the following children:

1. Alexander Mackenzie, 10th of Gairloch.
2. Kenneth Mackenzie, who died in infancy.
3. Roderick Mackenzie, who was a captain in the army and was killed in Quebec.
4. William Mackenzie, a writer who died unmarried.
5. James Mackenzie, who died in infancy.
6. Kenneth Mackenzie of Millbank, who was factor and tutor to Sir Kenneth Mackenzie, 4th Baronet of Gairloch.
7. Margaret and Janet Mackenzie, who both died young.
8. Janet Mackenzie, who married with issue.
9. A natural son, Charles Mackenzie.

Sir Alexander Mackenzie died in 1766 in his 66th year.

== Alexander Mackenzie, X of Gairloch ==
Sir Alexander Mackenzie, 10th of Gairloch and third Baronet built Conon House between 1758 and 1760. He married firstly in 1755, Margaret, eldest daughter of Roderick Mackenzie, VII of Redcastle and had one son:

1. Hector Mackenzie, 11th of Gairloch.

He married secondly, Jean, daughter of John Gorry of Balblair, Commissary of Ross and had the following children:

1. John Mackenzie, who raised a company, mostly in Gairloch, for the 78th Regiment of Foot.
2. Kenneth Mackenzie, who was born in 1765 and served as a Captain in the army in India, including at the Siege of Seringapatam
3. Jean Mackenzie, who died young.
4. Margaret Mackenzie, who married with issue.
5. Janet Mackenzie, who married without issue.

He also had a natural daughter, Janet Mackenzie, who married with issue.

Sir Alexander Mackenzie died on April 15, 1770, and was buried at Gairloch.

== Hector Mackenzie, XI of Gairloch ==
Sir Hector Mackenzie, 11th of Gairloch and 4th Baronet was known in Scottish Gaelic as An Tighearna Storach which means the Buck-toothed Laird. He was only 12 years old when he succeeded and his affairs were managed by trustees appointed by his father.

In 1789, he obtained authority from the Court to sell lands which his father had originally intended for him to use pay off the debts on the estate.

In 1815, he was appointed Lord-Lieutenant of his native county. He generally lived at home among devoted tenantry and only visited London once in his life-time. He patronised the Gaelic poets including Alexander Campbell. He married in 1778 to Cochrane, daughter of James Chalmers of Fingland but without issue and the marriage was dissolved in 1796. He married a month later to Christian, daughter of William Henderson, Inverness. She was popularly known among the Gairloch people as A Bhantighearna Ruadh. They had the following children:

1. Francis Alexander Mackenzie, 12th of Gairloch.
2. William Mackenzie, a merchant in Java. He died unmarried in 1860 at Saint-Omer, France.
3. Hector Mackenzie, who married Lydia, eldest daughter of General Sir Hugh Fraser of Braelangwell. He was a captain in the Honourable East India Company and died without issue.
4. Dr John Mackenzie of Eileanach, who married with issue.
5. Roderick Mackenzie, who sold out, settled in Australia and married an Irish lady, Meta Day, who was the sister of the Bishop of Cashel.

He also had three natural children with the house-keeper, Jean Urquhart.

Sir Hector Mackenzie died on April 26, 1826, and was buried in Beauly Priory.

== Francis Alexander Mackenzie, XII of Gairloch ==
Francis Alexander Mackenzie, 12th of Gairloch and fifth Baronet, was like his father interested in the county affairs. During the Highland Potato Famine he sent cargoes of meal and seed potatoes to the Gairloch tenantry in 1836–37. This left him in debt with Grant of Redcastle and he arranged for his brother, Dr John Mackenzie of Eileanach, to manage his affairs. He and his second wife went for a few years to Brittany where their son Osgood Hanbury Mackenzie was born. The Dr ultimately had to pay Grant £7000 to clear Francis Mackenzie's debt.

In 1836, Francis Mackenzie published Hints for the Use of Highland Tenants and Cottagers, which consisted of 273 pages with English and Gaelic versions written on opposite pages.

He married firstly, in the 31st year of his age, in 1829, Cythe Caroline, eldest daughter of Smith-Wright of Rempstone Hall, Nottinghamshire. They had the following children:

1. Kenneth Smith Mackenzie, 13th of Gairloch.
2. Francis Harford Mackenzie, born in 1833.

Francis Alexander Mackenzie married secondly, Mary, daughter of Osgood Hanbury of Holifield Grange, Essex and had one son:

1. Osgood Hanbury Mackenzie.

== Kenneth Smith Mackenzie, XIII of Gairloch ==
Kenneth Smith Mackenzie, 13th of Gairloch and 6th Baronet was born in 1832 took an active part in supply matters in his home county. He was Convenor of the Commissioners of Supply and of the County Council. He was also Lord Lieutenant of Ross and Cromarty. In 1854, he was appointed Attaché to Her Majesty's Legation in Washington but never joined. In 1855, he received a commission as a captain in the Highland Rifles (Ross-shire Militia). He later attained the rank of Major and then retired. In 1880 he contested against Donald Cameron of Lochiel as the Tory candidate for the county of Inverness but was defeated. He was a member of the Napier Commission from 1883 to 1884.

He married in 1860 to Elia Frederica, daughter of Walter Frederic Campbell of Islay, and had the following children:

1. Kenneth John Mackenzie, Younger of Gairloch, born in 1861 and a captain in the Rifle Brigade. He married with issue.
2. Francis Granville Mackenzie, born 1865.
3. Murial Katharine Mackenzie.

== See also ==
- Mackenzie baronets
- Inglis baronets
- Chiefs of Clan Mackenzie

== Notes ==
- A Historian Angus Mackay stated that it was actually William Du Mackay, II of Aberach who Hector Roy Mackenzie of Gairloch's daughter had married and not John Mackay, I of Aberach.
