= Battle of Lagabraad =

1480 battle

- Part of MacDonald-Mackenzie feud
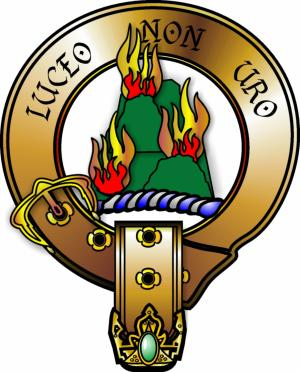
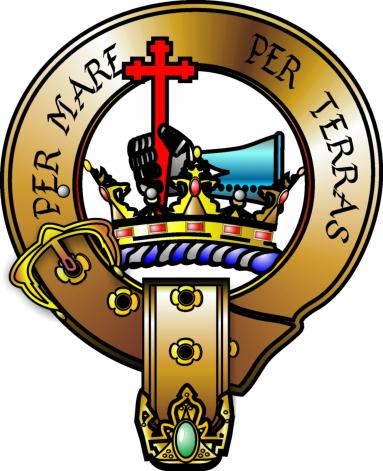
- Clan crests of Clan Mackenzie (left) and Clan Donald (right)
Date	Between 1480, or 1483
Location	Lagabraad, Ross, Scotland
Result	Rebel Victory

Belligerents
Lordship of the Isles: Clan Donald	Kingdom of Scotland: Clan Mackenzie; Clan Mackay; Clan Brodie; Clan Fraser of Lovat; Clan Ross

Commanders and leaders
Angus MacDonald	Earl of Atholl; Mackenzie of Kintail

Strength
Unknown	Unknown

Casualties and losses
Unknown	517 killed

The Battle of Lagabraad, also known as the Battle of Logiebride, or Lagebread, was a Scottish clan battle that took place in 1480, or 1483, and was fought between the Clan Donald and the Clan Mackenzie of the Scottish Highlands.

== Background ==
In 1475, John of Islay, Earl of Ross, chief of Clan Donald, forfeited the MacDonald Earldom of Ross to James III of Scotland and although the MacDonald Lordship of the Isles was not forfeited until 1493, in many ways 1475 marked the end of the lordship as a potent force. John of Islay's natural son, Aonghas Óg (Angus), was at feud with Kenneth Mackenzie, 7th of Kintail, chief of Clan Mackenzie, and believed that the Mackenzies intended to acquire the Earldom of Ross. Angus therefore gathered a large force from the Isles as well as men from the Clan MacDonald of Keppoch and the Clan MacDonell of Glengarry, and set out for Ross. The government realizing that they faced a rebellion of some magnitude commissioned John Stewart, 1st Earl of Atholl to set out and subdue it.

The Clan Donald account of their feud with the Mackenzies states that according to one manuscript history of the Mackenzies, Angus is described as having fought a battle which actually took place after his death and that his uncle, Celestine MacDonald, who died in 1478, is described as having been killed in 1491 at the Battle of Blar Na Pairce (Battle of Park). The Clan Donald account goes on to say that the Battle of Lagabraad where the MacDonalds defeated the Mackenzies was not recorded in any of the Mackenzie family chronicles, but that the Battle of Park where the Mackenzies defeated the MacDonalds is honoured with particular detail.

== Battle ==
According to the Clan Donald account, the noble Earl of Atholl at the head of the northern clans which included the Mackenzies, Mackays, Brodies, Frasers, and Rosses took to the field against the Western host. The two armies met at a place called Lagabraad and sanguinary battle took place which resulted in a victory for Angus and the Clan Donald and an utter rout of his opponents. The Earl of Atholl's army lost 517 men killed and the chief of Mackays was allegedly captured, while the Earl and Kenneth Mackenzie barely escaped with their lives.

== Aftermath ==
Soon after the battle, the government gave instructions to the Earl of Huntly and Earl of Crawford to lead a new expedition against the rebels. However, it is not clear if they did so with hostile action or with success. Angus seems to have later reconciled with the Earl of Atholl.
