= Kinkell Castle =

Castle in the Scottish Highlands

Coordinates: 57°33′21″N 4°25′07″W

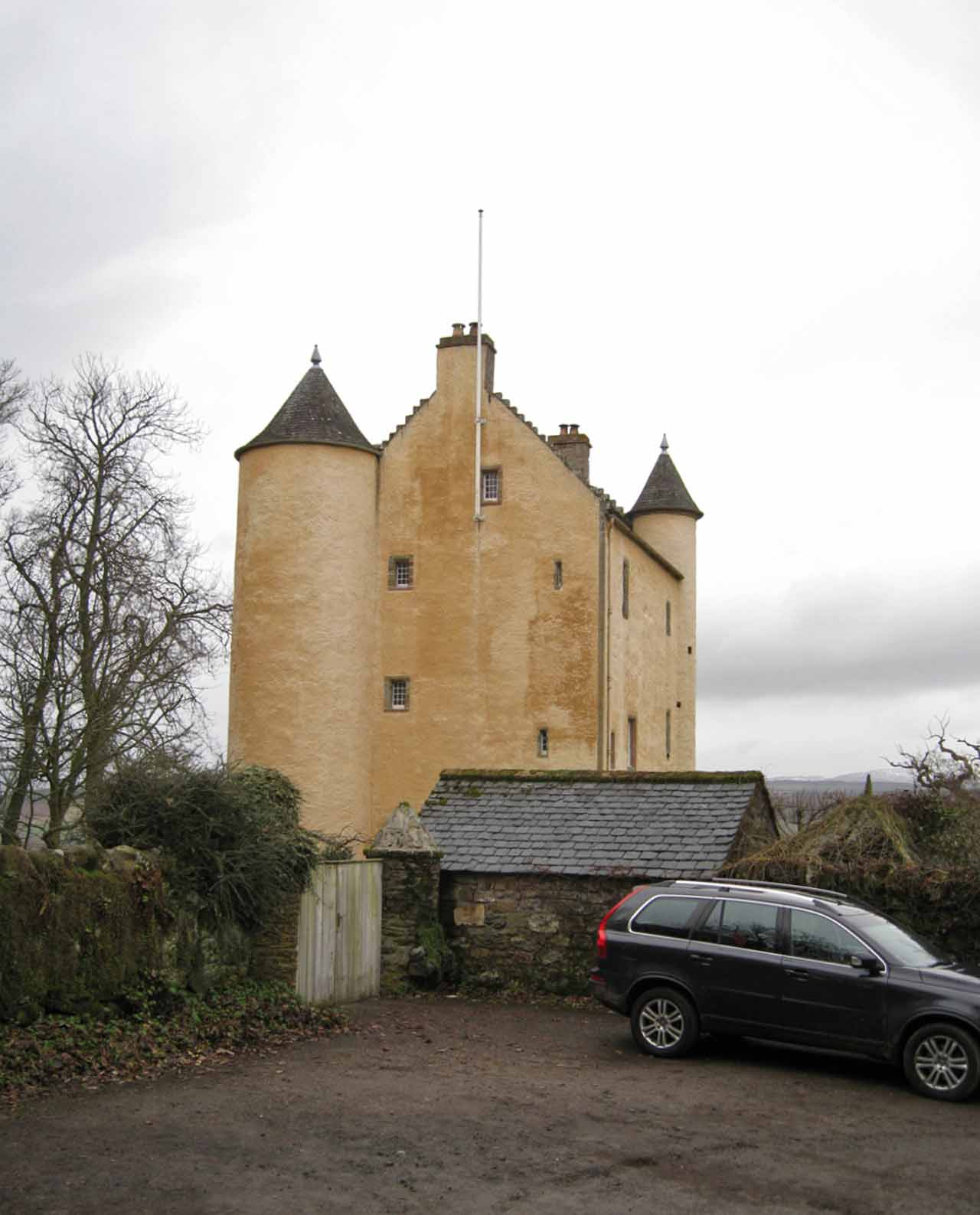
Kinkell Castle

Kinkell Castle, also known as the Tower of Kinkell, is a castle located in the parish Urquhart and Logie Wester, in the former county of Ross and Cromarty, on the peninsula known as the Black Isle, in the Scottish Highlands. It was the seat of the Mackenzies of Gairloch, a branch of the Clan Mackenzie.

== Architecture ==
It is three storeys tall and also has an attic. It includes a round tower that houses the stairs and is topped with a watch room. The basement is vaulted and once contained the kitchen. The great hall was on the floor above. The entrance is guarded by gun loops. It is a Z-plan castle.

== History ==
The castle was constructed in the 1590s for John Roy Mackenzie, IV of Gairloch. A keystone above the fireplace has the date 1594. In 1619, Mackenzie received a charter under the Great Seal of Scotland for Kinkell to be included in his barony of Gairloch and for Kinkell to be its chief messuage. His coat of arms and those of his first wife are above the mantlepiece in the great hall.

From 1968, the castle was restored by the pop artist Gerald Laing and used as the Back Isle Bronze Age foundry for bronze casting. He died in 2011 and it has since been maintained by his son.

The castle has been A listed by Historic Scotland since March 25, 1971.
