= Clan Mackenzie =

Scottish clan

- Clann Choinnich
- Crest: A mount in flames Proper
- Motto: Luceo Non Uro (I Shine Not Burn)
- War cry: Tùlach Àrd (The High Hill)

Profile
- Region: Highland
- District: Ross-shire
- Plant badge: Variegated Holly or Deergrass
- Pipe music: Cabar Fèidh

Chief
- John Ruaridh Grant Mackenzie
- 5th Earl of Cromartie (Caberféidh)
- Seat: Castle Leod
- Historic seat: Eilean Donan Castle
Septs of Clan Mackenzie
Charles, Charleson, Clunes, Clunies, Cross, Iverach, Iverson, Ivory, Kenneth, Kennethson, Kinnach, Kynoch, MacAulay, Macaweeney, MacBeolain, MacBeath, MacBeth, MacConnach, MacCure, Maceur, MacIver, MacIvor, MacKenna, MacKenney, MacKerlich, MacKinna, MacKinney, MacKinnie, MacLeay, MacMurchie, MacMurchy, MacQueenie, MacThearliach, MacVanish, MacVennie, MacVinish, MacVinnie, MacWeeny, MacWhinnie, Makiver, Murchie, Murchison, Smart, Tuach,
Clan branches
Mackenzie of Kintail (historic chiefs)
Mackenzie of Seaforth (historic chiefs)
Mackenzie of Cromarty (current chiefs)
Mackenzie of Hilton (senior cadets)^{[A]}
Mackenzie of Gairloch (senior cadets)^{[A]}
Mackenzie of Achilty
Mackenzie of Allangrange (last agnatic chiefs)
Mackenzie of Applecross
Mackenzie of Ardloch
Mackenzie of Ardross and Dundonnel
Mackenzie of Ballone
Mackenzie of Belmaduthy
Mackenzie of Berkeley Square
Mackenzie of Brea
Mackenzie of Cleanwaters
Mackenzie of Coul
Mackenzie of Dailuaine
Mackenzie of Darien
Mackenzie of Davochmaluag
Mackenzie of Delvine
Mackenzie of Dolphinton
Mackenzie of Dundonnel (Old)
Mackenzie of Fairburn
Mackenzie of Fawley Court and Farr
Mackenzie of Findon and Mountgerald
Mackenzie of Flowerburn
Mackenzie of Glack
Mackenzie of Glenbervie
Mackenzie of Glen Muick
Mackenzie of Groundwater
Mackenzie of Gruinard
Mackenzie of Highfield
Mackenzie of Brae
Mackenzie of Kernsary
Mackenzie of Kilcoy
Mackenzie of Killichrist
Mackenzie of Kincraig
Mackenzie of Letterewe
Mackenzie of Lochend
Mackenzie of Loggie
Mackenzie of Mornish
Mackenzie of Mountgerald
Mackenzie of Muirton and Meikle Scatwell
Mackenzie of Ord
Mackenzie of Pitlundie and Culbo
Mackenzie of Portmore
Mackenzie of Redcastle
Mackenzie of Royston
Mackenzie of Scatwell
Sliochd Alastair Chaim
Mackenzie of Suddie
Mackenzie of Tarbat
McKenzie of Torry
Mackenzie of Torridon
Mackenzie of Wedellsborg
Allied clans
Clan Stewart
Clan MacRae
Clan MacLennan
Clan Matheson
Clan Morrison
Clan Mackintosh
Clan Maclean
Rival clans
Clan Ross
Clan Rose
Clan Munro
Clan MacDonald
Clan Fraser of Lovat
Clan MacLeod of Lewis

Clan Mackenzie (Scottish Gaelic: Clann MacCoinnich [ˈkʰl̪ˠãũn̪ˠ max'kɤɲiç]) is a Highland Scottish clan associated with Kintail and Ross-shire. Its chiefs trace their lineage to the 12th century, though the earliest recorded chief is Alexander Mackenzie of Kintail, who died after 1471. The clan supported Robert the Bruce during the Wars of Scottish Independence, but later feuded with the Earls of Ross.

During the 15th and 16th centuries, Clan Mackenzie participated in several feuds with neighboring clans. In the 17th century, their chief was granted the title Earl of Seaforth, and the clan supported the Royalists in the Scottish Civil War. They backed the Jacobites in 1715 but were divided in 1745, with their chief, Kenneth Mackenzie, Lord Fortrose, supporting the British government, while George Mackenzie, 3rd Earl of Cromartie, joined the Jacobites. Clan Mackenzie has a chief that is recognized by the Court of the Lord Lyon, and the Lord Lyon King of Arms, who is the heraldic authority in Scotland.

== History ==
=== Traditional origins ===
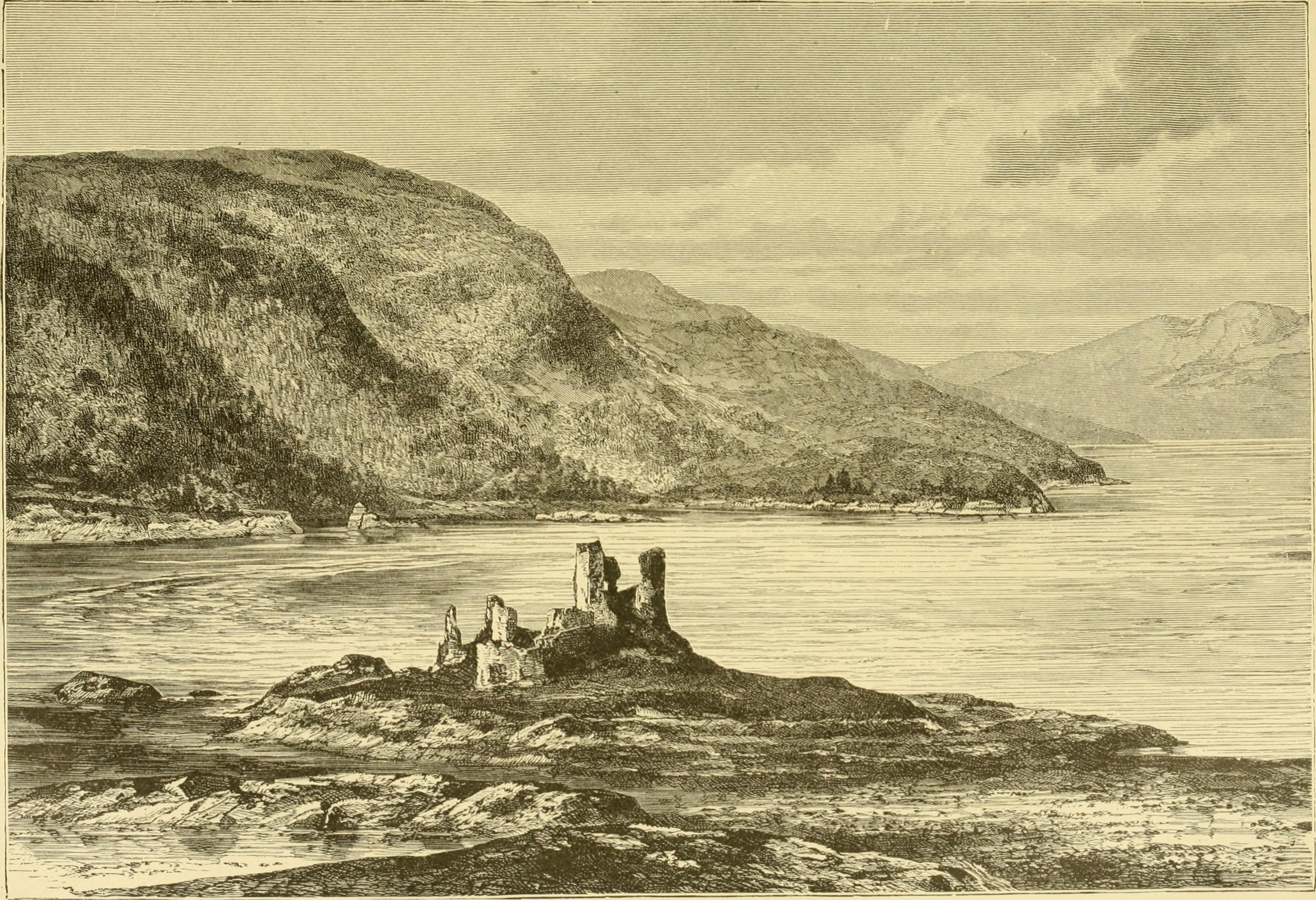
The ruins of Eilean Donan Castle, an early stronghold of the Mackenzies of Kintail and their allies, the Clan MacRae, who were constables of the castle for the Mackenzies. It is located in the Lochalsh district in western Ross-shire.

The MacKenzies are believed to have the same ancestry as the Matheson and Anrias clans. All three are said to be descended from Gilleoin of the Aird, a Gaelic dynast who lived in the early 12th century. Another theory is that all three are descended from the thirteenth century Kermac Macmaghan. The chiefs of the Clan Mackenzie are said to have been settled at their great stronghold on Eilean Donan by 1297.

All of the earliest traditional Clan Mackenzie histories claim descent from a Fitzgerald progenitor. These histories include those by John Mackenzie of Applecross (died c. 1684/5), George Mackenzie, 1st Earl of Cromartie (died 1714) and the unpublished Letterfearn, Ardintoul and Allangrange manuscripts. It is believed that all of these histories ultimately derive from a single manuscript created by William MacQueen, Parson of Assynt in 1576, now lost. Alexander Mackenzie followed the Fitzgerald theory for the first edition of his History of the Mackenzies in 1879, but abandoned it in his later 1894 edition based on the intervening publication of genealogies contained in MS 1467.

==== Wars of Scottish Independence ====
In the 14th century during the Wars of Scottish Independence the Clan Mackenzie is said to have been among the clans who fought on the side of Robert the Bruce at the 1308 Battle of Inverurie against the forces of the Clan Comyn who were rivals to the throne. Chief Iain Mac Coinnich is said to have led a force of five hundred Mackenzies at the Battle of Bannockburn in 1314 where the English were defeated.

Later in the 14th century, the Mackenzies are said to have become involved in battles against their powerful neighbour the Earl of Ross and their allies. This resulted in the capture and subsequent execution of chief Kenneth Mackenzie in 1346. Soon after this it appears that his successor as chief of the clan Mackenzie was living in an island castle in Loch Kinellan near Strathpeffer in Easter Ross and it was from this base that the clan was to advance westward once again to Kintail.

=== Recorded origins ===
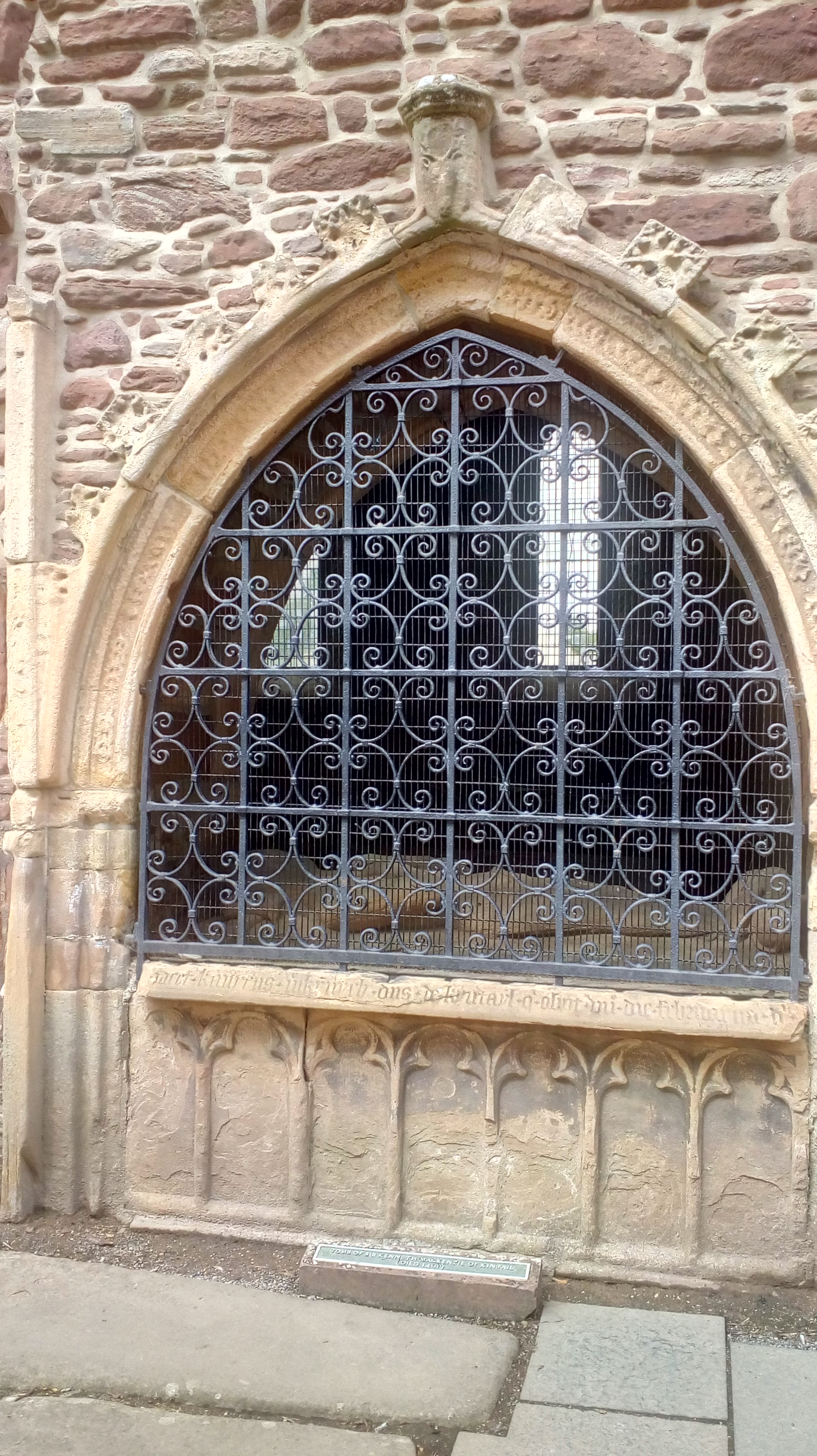
The earliest likeness of a Mackenzie - the effigy of Kenneth Mackenzie, 7th of Kintail (d. 1491/ 1492) located at Beauly Priory.

An early genealogy of the Mackenzies appears in MS 1467, but the earliest contemporary record of a living Mackenzie is of Alexander Mackenzie of Kintail (Alexandro McKennye de Kintaill) who appeared in two supplications for papal dispensation in 1465 and 1466, and was listed as a witness to a charter by John of Islay, Earl of Ross, and Lord of the Isles on 4 November 1471. The earliest known likeness of a Mackenzie is that of Sir Kenneth Mackenzie (d. 7 February 1491/1492), whose effigy can be seen at Beauly Priory. He is the first Mackenzie to be buried at Beauly Priory. There is no reliable evidence to support the traditional assertion that previous members of his family were buried at Iona.

=== 15th century and clan conflicts ===
In 1452 a force of tribes loyal to Mackenzie of Kintail took hostage a relative of the Earl of Ross. This resulted in the Battle of Bealach nam Broig which was fought to the north-west of Ben Wyvis. The Clan Munro and their septs the Dingwalls rescued the Ross hostage but won a hollow victory, with a great loss of their own men.

In 1488 the Clan Mackenzie fought at the Battle of Sauchieburn led by Hector Roy Mackenzie but after the defeat of the King's forces there, Hector narrowly escaped, returning to Ross-shire where he took Redcastle from the Clan Rose, for the rebels.

In 1491 the Battle of Blar Na Pairce was fought between the Mackenzies and the MacDonalds. This was followed by the Raid on Ross also in 1491 when the Clan Mackenzie clashed with a number of clans including the Clan MacDonald of Lochalsh, Clan MacDonald of Clanranald, Clan Cameron and the Chattan Confederation of Clan Mackintosh.

In 1497 Alexander MacDonald of Lochalsh and his clan rebelled against the King. MacDonald invaded the fertile lands of Ross-shire where he was defeated in battle by the Mackenzies at the Battle of Drumchatt (1497), after which he was driven out of Ross-shire.

=== 16th century and clan conflicts ===
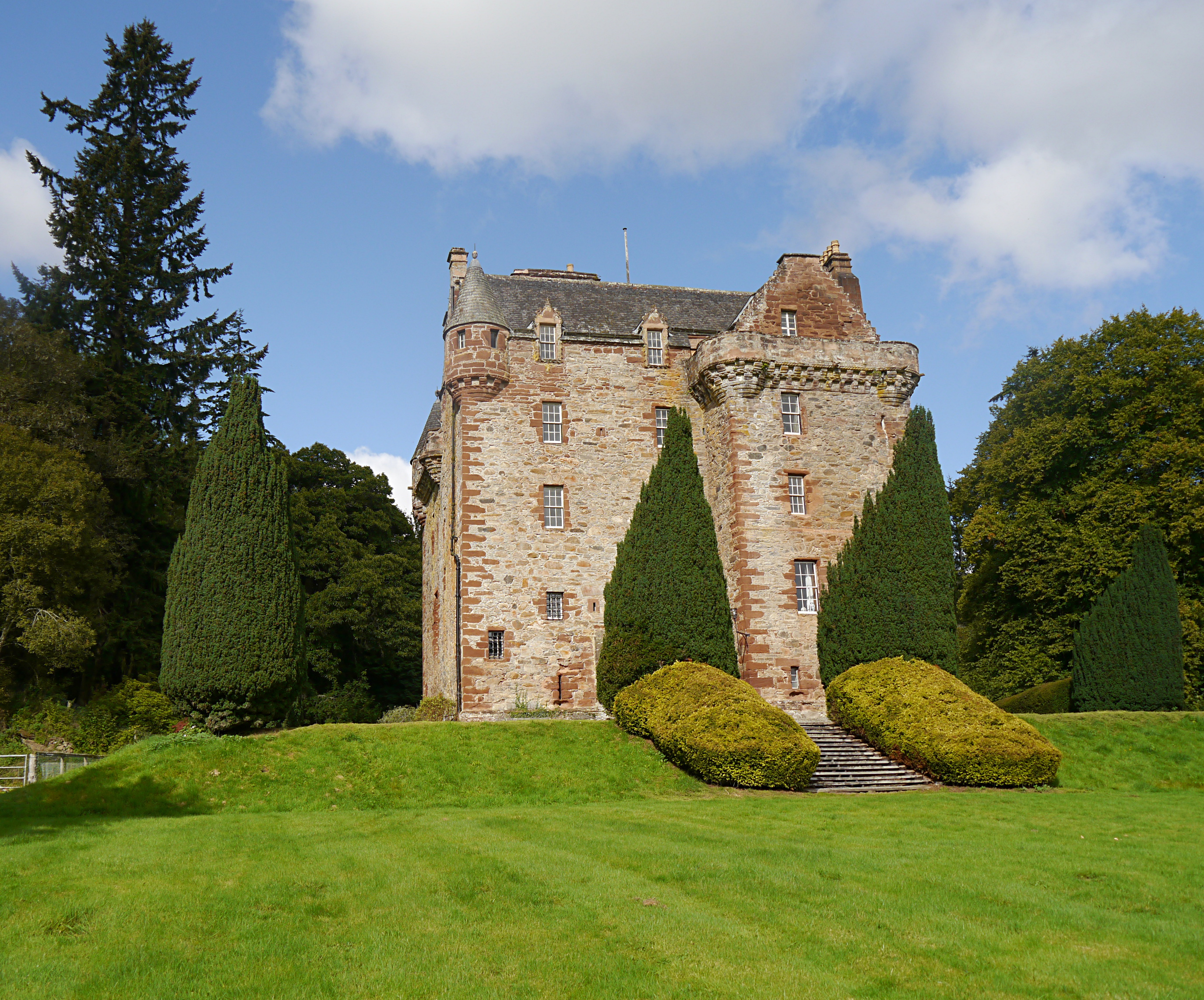
Castle Leod is a historic castle and traditional seat of Clan Mackenzie. The castle is located in the village of Strathpeffer, about a half-hour drive northwest of Inverness.

During the Anglo-Scottish Wars John Mackenzie, 9th of Kintail led the clan at the Battle of Flodden in 1513. John escaped but many of his followers lost their lives. John Mackenzie also fought at the Battle of Pinkie Cleugh in 1547 where he was captured by the English. However, his clan paid a ransom of cows for his release.

The growing importance of the Clan Mackenzie was vividly demonstrated in 1544 when the Earl of Huntly, the Lieutenant of the North, commanded chief John Mackenzie to raise his clan against Clan Ranald of Moidart. The Mackenzie chief refused and Huntly's supporters, the Clan Grant, Clan Ross and Clan Mackintosh declined to attack the Mackenzies. From that time the Mackenzies were recognised as a separate and superior force in the north-west.

On 13 December 1545 at Dingwall, the Earl of Sutherland entered into a bond of manrent with John Mackenzie of Kintail for mutual defence against all enemies, reserving only their allegiance to the youthful Mary, Queen of Scots.

At the Battle of Langside in May 1568 the Mackenzies fought on the side of Mary, Queen of Scots, against the forces of her half-brother James Stewart, 1st Earl of Moray. Their chief, Kenneth Mackenzie, 10th of Kintail died the following month and was buried at Beauly.

In 1570, a feud broke out with the Munros over Chanonry Castle. Andrew Munro of Milntown defended it for three years against the Clan Mackenzie, at the expense of many lives on both sides. The feud was settled when the castle was handed over to the Mackenzies by an "Act of Pacification".

In 1597, the Battle of Logiebride took place between the Mackenzies and MacLeods of Raasay against the Munros and the Bain family of Tulloch Castle.

=== 17th century and Civil War ===
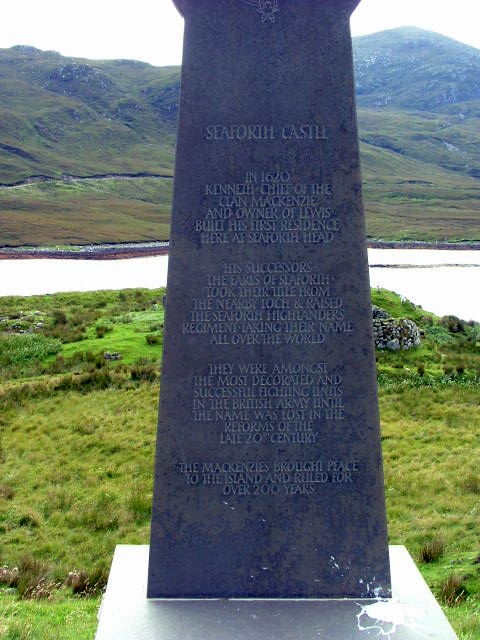
Commemorative stone to the Mackenzies of Seaforth on the Isle of Lewis. The Mackenzie chief's title of Earl of Seaforth took its name from Loch Seaforth between the Isles of Lewis and Harris

By the beginning of the 17th century the territory of the Mackenzies extended from the Black Isle in the east to the Outer Hebrides in the west. They took over the Isle of Lewis from its former Clan MacLeod of Lewis rulers and also Loch Alsh from the MacDonells. The Battle of Morar in 1602 was fought between the Clan Mackenzie and Clan MacDonell of Glengarry.

In 1623, the clan chief Colin Mackenzie was made Earl of Seaforth, a title in the peerage of Scotland, taking his title from a sea loch on the Isle of Lewis.

In 1645, Lord Seaforth, fighting as a Covenanter, led a force against the royalist James Graham, 1st Marquess of Montrose, at the Battle of Auldearn where the Covenanters were defeated. Montrose followed up his success by destroying many houses that belonged to people who had opposed the royalist cause, including that of Thomas Mackenzie of Pluscarden. Later in 1649, Thomas Mackenzie of Pluscarden adopted the royalist cause and led his own uprising in the Siege of Inverness (1649).

In 1672, the Mackenzies were granted a commission of "fire and sword" against the MacLeods of Assynt who were a branch of the Clan MacLeod of Lewis and were seated at Ardvreck Castle, which was attacked and captured by the Mackenzies, who took control of the lands of Assynt.

In 1688, Kenneth Mackenzie of Suddie was killed leading a Government-backed Independent Highland Company in support of Mackintosh against the Clan MacDonald of Keppoch who were supported by the Clan Cameron at the Battle of Mulroy. During the Williamite War in Ireland the Clan Mackenzie (led by their chief Kenneth Mackenzie, 4th Earl of Seaforth) are believed to have supported King James at the Siege of Derry and the Battle of the Boyne in 1690.

=== 18th century and Jacobite risings ===
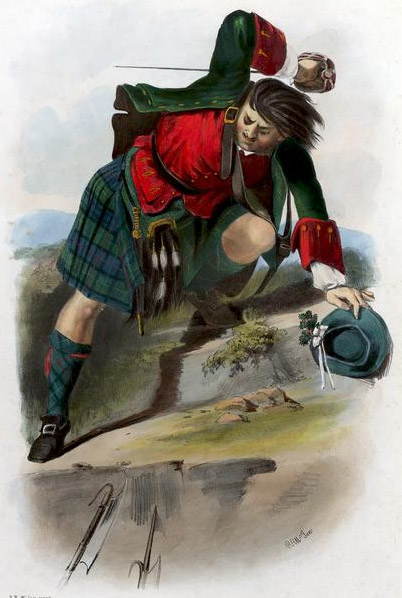
A romanticised Victorian-era illustration of a Clan Mackenzie clansman by R. R. McIan from The Clans of the Scottish Highlands published in 1845.

During the Jacobite rising of 1715 chief William Mackenzie, 5th Earl of Seaforth led the Clan Mackenzie in support of the Jacobite rebels. However, during the Jacobite rising of 1745 the Clan Mackenzie was divided: The chief, Kenneth Mackenzie, Lord Fortrose, did not support the Jacobites and raised several Independent Highland Companies from the Clan Mackenzie to support the British Government. However, during the 1745 rising a large part of the Clan Mackenzie followed the chief's cousin, George Mackenzie, 3rd Earl of Cromartie who was a Jacobite.

==== 1715 and 1719 Jacobite risings ====
In what is known as the Skirmish of Alness in 1715 the Earl of Seaforth, chief of Mackenzie led a force of 3000 men that forced the retreat of a smaller force loyal to the British Government, which was commanded by the Earl of Sutherland and included the clans Sutherland, Munro, Ross and Mackay. Much of the Ross's and Munro's lands were ravaged, but they retaliated by raiding the Mackenzie lands in what is known as the Siege of Brahan.

The Siege of Inverness (1715) came to an end when the town, which was being held by the Mackenzies was surrendered to Simon Fraser of Lovat. Soon after this Colonel Sir Robert Munro, 6th Baronet of Foulis marched into the town of Inverness with 400 Munros and took over control as governor from Fraser. Government troops arrived in Inverness towards the end of February, and for some months the process of disarming the rebels went on, led by a Munro detachment under George Munro of Culcairn.

The clan rivalries which had erupted in rebellion were finding an outlet in local politics. The Mackenzie's position as Earl of Seaforth came to an end in 1716, and it seems to have been arranged that while the Clan Ross held the county seat the Munros would represent the Tain Burghs. To secure the burghs, control of three out of the five was necessary. Ross ascendancy was secure in Tain, and from 1716 to 1745 the Munros controlled Dingwall.

The Clan Mackenzie fought at the Battle of Glen Shiel in 1719 where they were defeated by Government forces and the Mackenzie chief was wounded, afterwards retreating to the Western Isles and from there to the Continent. In 1721 the Clan Mackenzie, led by Donald Murchison, defeated Government supporters from the Clan Ross at the Battle of Glen Affric. This was followed by the Battle of Coille Bhan where again, led by Donald Murchison and also his relative Kenneth Murchison, the Clan Mackenzie defeated Government forces. General Wade's report on the Highlands in 1724, estimated the clan strength at 3,000 men.

==== 1745 Jacobite rising ====
George Mackenzie, 3rd Earl of Cromartie led the Jacobite Mackenzies at the Battle of Falkirk (1746) where they were victorious in helping to defeat British Government forces. The Mackenzies then went on to lay waste to the lands of the Munros who supported the Government and burn down Foulis Castle. They also went on to lay waste to the lands of the Clan Sutherland and the Earl of Sutherland who also supported the Government, and captured Dunrobin Castle, although the Earl of Sutherland himself escaped through a back door. However, soon after this as the Earl of Cromartie and his forces were travelling south to meet Charles Edward Stuart they were attacked by the Mackay and Sutherland Independent Highland Companies who supported the British Government in what became known as the Battle of Littleferry and the Jacobite Mackenzies were prevented from joining the Jacobite army at the Battle of Culloden. Soon after George Mackenzie, 3rd Earl of Cromartie and his son were captured at Dunrobin Castle. The Earl of Cromartie's titles were then forfeited.

Roderick Mackenzie was a Jacobite soldier who was killed during the tumultuous aftermath of the Jacobite rising of 1745 while acting as a body double for the Jacobite leader Charles Edward Stuart (Bonnie Prince Charlie) in July 1746. His grave and cairn can still be seen today in Glenmoriston.

Other Mackenzies took the side of the British Government: the chief, Kenneth Mackenzie, Lord Fortrose had in fact raised three Independent Highland Companies to support the British Government. In one of the Independent Highland Companies under Captain Colin Mackenzie it is recorded at Shiramore in Badenoch in June 1746 and it included many of them from Kintail as well as more than sixty men from the Clan MacRae.

==== Wars in France and India ====
A number of famous regiments have been raised from the Mackenzie clan, including the Highland Light Infantry (raised in 1777), the Seaforth Highlanders (raised in 1778), and the second battalion of the Seaforth Highlanders, known as the Ross-shire Buffs (raised in 1793). All those regiments wore the MacKenzie tartan. Born in 1754, Chief Francis Mackenzie, 1st Baron Seaforth, the last Lord Seaforth raised a regiment for the British Army in 1778, the 72nd, and the clan produced another the 78th in 1793. Both had distinguished records fighting against Napoleon and were later amalgamated into the Queen's Own Highlanders.

The 78th Regiment, as it was first called, was raised in 1778 from men on the Seaforth and other Mackenzie estates. The Earl of Seaforth, having raised his men, sailed with them to India in 1781, but died there a few months later. During the Wars in India, Colin Mackenzie (1754–1821) was Surveyor General of India, and an art collector and orientalist. He produced many of the first accurate maps of India, and his research and collections contributed significantly to the field of Asian studies. In 1799, he was part of the British force at the Battle of Seringapatam. He also fought in the Napoleonic Wars.

=== 19th century to present ===
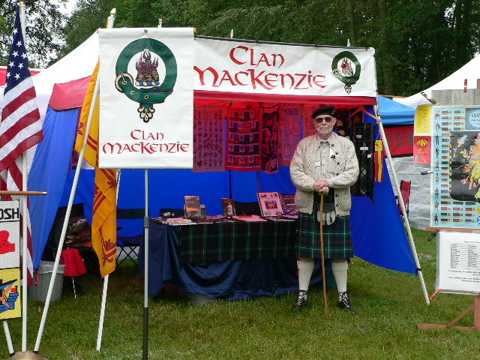
Clan Mackenzie tent at the 2005 Bellingham, Northumberland, England, Highland Games

Throughout the 19th century Clan Mackenzie was without a chief that was recognised by the Lord Lyon King of Arms. In 1979, Roderick Grant Francis Blunt-Mackenzie, 4th Earl of Cromartie, legally changed his surname to Mackenzie and was widely recognised as Chief of the clan (for example by Clan Mackenzie Societies around the Commonwealth). Although not descended from a Mackenzie in the male line (his father was born a Blunt and later changed to Blunt-Mackenzie after marrying Sibell Lilian Sutherland-Leveson-Gower, Countess of Cromartie), he inherited his titles and Mackenzie descent through his mother (even she only claims a Mackenzie descent as a great-great-great-great-granddaughter of George Mackenzie, 3rd Earl of Cromartie).

On his death in 1990 his son John Ruaridh Mackenzie, 5th Earl of Cromartie succeeded as chief of Clan Mackenzie. The Earl of Cromartie still owns lands in clan country however, the largest remaining Mackenzie landowner by some margin is Mackenzie of Gairloch, with an estate which extends to over 50,000 acres (like the clan chief, Mackenzie of Gairloch has inherited his clan name and lands through the female line). The current chief is a member of the Standing Council of Scottish Chiefs.

The current chief of Clan Mackenzie lives at Castle Leod, which is thought to date from the 16th century. The chief has leased the unoccupied old tower to the Clan Mackenzie Charitable Trust (CMCT) for 99 years. In 1991 it was announced that the castle was planned to be restored. The restoration was to include a clan genealogical centre that would be open to the public. During the 1990s there was extensive work done on the tower. In 2002 the Highland Buildings Preservation Trust (HBPT) was contacted, to carry out a feasibility study to investigate the potential for the re-use of the upper floor space of the tower, which deemed public funding to be sought to cover the costs of restoration. Because of concerns of physical and legal separation between the clan chief and the tower, the chief decided that the conditions of public funding were too onerous.

== Chief ==
Clan chief: John Ruaridh Grant Mackenzie, 5th Earl of Cromartie (b. 1948), Viscount Tarbat of Tarbat, Baron Castlehaven, Baron MacLeod of Castle Leod, Chief of Clan Mackenzie. Chiefs of Clan Mackenzie are titled as Caberféidh (translation from Scottish Gaelic: "Deer's antlers"). This Gaelic title is derived from the stag's head charge on the former chief, the Earl of Seaforth's coat of arms.

== Castles ==
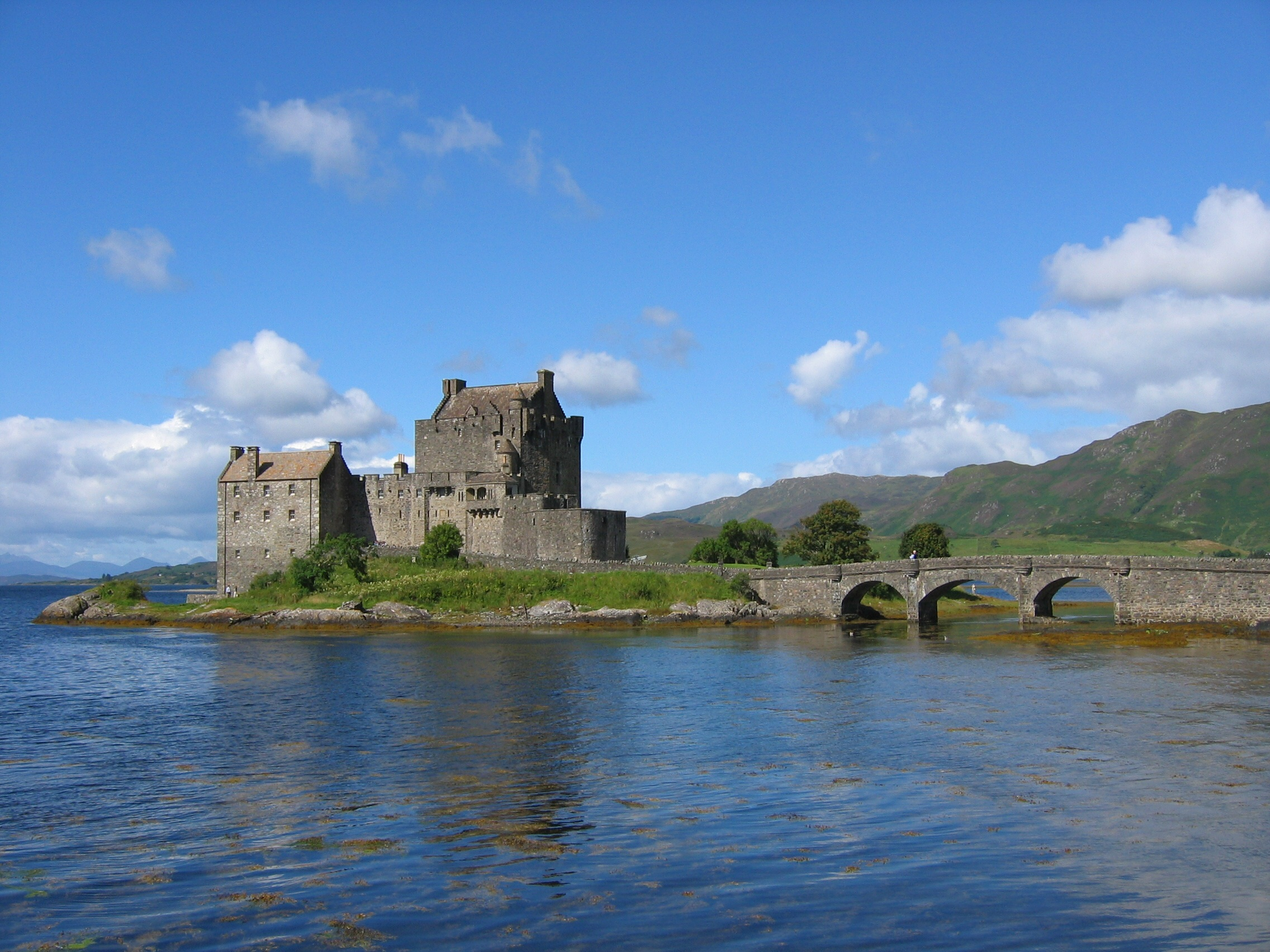
Clan Mackenzie abandoned Eilean Donan Castle in 1719, after it was destroyed by British government ships during the Jacobite rising, and it remained in ruins for over two centuries. It was reconstructed by a MacRae descendant in the 20th century.

Castle owned by the Clan Mackenzie have included:

- Eilean Donan Castle was long held by the Mackenzies of Kintail and it may have been given to them after they helped to defeat the Norsemen at the Battle of Largs in 1263. William Mackenzie, 5th Earl of Seaforth had the castle garrisoned with Spanish troops during the Jacobite rising of 1719, although the castle was battered into submission by three frigates, and it was then blown up from within with barrels of gunpowder. The ghost of one of the Spanish soldiers who was killed is said to haunt the castle. The castle was left very ruinous before being completely rebuilt in the twentieth century.
- Brahan Castle, about three miles south-west of Dingwall has now been completely demolished except for one wall. It was held by the Mackenzies of Brahan who were patrons of the Brahan Seer.
- Castle Leod which is a few miles west of Dingwall is an L-plan tower house that dates from the seventeenth century with later additions. The current Castle Leod was built by Sir Roderick Mackenzie of Coigach in about 1610. His descendant was George Mackenzie, 3rd Earl of Cromartie who was forfeited for his part in the Jacobite rising of 1745 after being captured at Dunrobin Castle.
- Ardvreck Castle was built by the MacLeods of Assynt but it later passed to the Mackenzies who sacked the castle in 1672.
- Fairburn Tower was built for Murdo Mackenzie in the 1540s. It is a ruin and the Landmark Trust plans to restore it.
- Kilcoy Castle near Muir of Ord, Ross and Cromarty, is a Z-plan tower house that was held from 1618 by Alexander Mackenzie, son of the eleventh baron of Kintail, chief of the clan. It was once ruinous but has now been restored and is still occupied.
- Kinkell Castle, in the parish of Urquhart and Logie Wester on the Black Isle peninsula, was seat of the Mackenzies of Gairloch from the 1590s.
- Redcastle near Muir of Ord, near Ross and Cromarty, is a ruined L-plan tower house that was held by the Mackenzies from 1570 to 1790. It was burned in 1649 and later passed to the Ballies of Dochfour. The castle is now a shell.
- Tarbat House was erected by John Mackenzie, Lord MacLeod with work starting in 1784. It was built on the site of a previous mansion which had been built for George Mackenzie, 1st Earl of Cromartie in the late 17th century, replacing Milntown Castle. When George Mackenzie bought the Milntown estate in 1656, he renamed it New Tarbat after Tarbat Castle, the family's original seat near Portmahomack. Some of the remains of George Mackenzie's mansion were incorporated into the new one. Concurrent with the construction of the new house, Lord MacLeod planted thousands of new forest and fir trees on the estate. Some of the final building work on the house was unfinished when he died in 1789 after a year-long illness. The remaining work was completed to his plans by his cousin and successor, Kenneth Mackenzie.

== Tartan ==
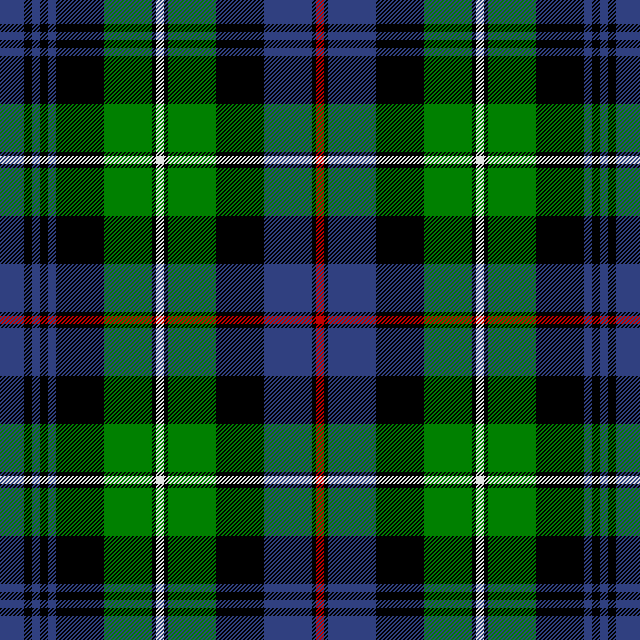
The Mackenzie tartan, otherwise known as the regimental tartan of the Seaforth Highlanders.

Tartans associated with the name Mackenzie include :

- Mackenzie.
- The tartan is the regimental tartan of the Seaforth Highlanders, which was raised in 1778 by the Earl of Seaforth. The tartan is recorded in the Collection of the Highland Society of London in 1816. The tartan is worn by members of the Royal Military College of Canada Pipes and Drums band.
- Mackenzie dress.
- Mackenzie hunting.
- Mackenzie Millennium, also known as Mackenzie 78th Highlanders. This tartan, according to the Clan Mackenzie Society of Scotland and the UK website, was recently "discovered" and recreated for the "Millennium Gathering". The society currently sells this tartan.

== Popular culture ==
Fictional Mackenzies appear in the Outlander series of books by Diana Gabaldon.

The Seat of the Clan Mackenzie, Castle Leod is widely considered to be the inspiration behind Castle Leoch, the home of the Clan Mackenzie, in Diana Gabaldon's Outlander series. It was considered as a filming location for the TV series, however, Doune Castle was selected due to its ease of location.

Diana Gabaldon told STV that "When the TV show began scouting locations, I suggested Leod as a possibility. It's entirely accurate as to period, of course, and has magnificent grounds, with a park of enormous, exotic trees planted by centuries of MacKenzies and their visitors. (Diana herself planted a "very modest" rowan, as her "own wee contribution" to the history).

In the Emberverse series by S.M. Stirling, otherwise known as the 'Change' world, the founder of the Clan Mackenzie, Juniper Mackenzie, is descended from this Scottish clan.

== Notes ==
- A Although the Mackenzies of Hilton are the senior cadets of the clan because they descend from the second eldest son of the first proven chief Alexander Mackenzie, 6th of Kintail, the Mackenzies of Gairloch who descend from the third eldest son became guardians of Kenneth Mackenzie, 8th of Kintail because the first Mackenzie of Hilton had pre-deceased his elder brother, Kenneth Mackenzie, 7th of Kintail.

== Bibliography ==
- Moncreiffe of that Ilk, Iain. The Highland Clans. London: Barrie & Rockliff, 1967.
