= Kenneth Mackenzie, 10th of Kintail =

Kenneth Mackenzie (died 6 June 1568) was the 10th laird of Kintail and a Highland chief, being head of the Clan Mackenzie. He flourished in the turbulent Scottish politics of the mid-16th century and was nicknamed Coinneach na Cuirc in Scottish Gaelic (or “Kenneth of the Whittle”)

== Origins ==
Kenneth was the only son of John Mackenzie, 9th of Kintail (d. 1561) and Elizabeth, the daughter of John Grant of Grant. The Mackenzies were a clan from Ross-shire that had risen to prominence in the 15th century during the disintegration of the Lordship of the Isles. In 1539 he was tenant of Little Skattil and Bawblair and, by a charter dated 24 April 1543, his father resigned to him and his wife part of the lordship of Kintail and the lands of Mekill Braan.

== Disputes with the Earl of Huntly ==
In 1544, Kenneth was commanded by the Earl of Huntly, who held a commission as Lieutenant of the North from the Queen Regent, Mary of Guise, to raise his vassals and lead an expedition against Donald Glas Macdonald of Moidart. Kenneth declined, with the result that the Earl of Huntly ordered his entire army of 3,000 to proceed against both men. Huntly was however unsuccessful and was eventually obliged to retire from the West without achieving any significant victory. Some years later, Kenneth again embarrassed Huntly at a skirmish known as “the affair of Dingwall Bridge”.

== A follower of Queen Mary ==
Having succeeded his father in 1561, Kenneth was one of the Highland Chiefs who met Mary, Queen of Scots, at Inverness in 1562 and helped her to obtain possession of Inverness Castle, from which she had been excluded by Alexander Gordon, the governor. Thereafter, he appears to have retired from public life. An Act of the Privy Council of 21 May 1562 records that Kenneth delivered up to the Queen Marie MacLeod, the heiress of Harris and Dunvegan, who had somehow found herself in his custody. The Act held him harmless against any proceedings by James Macdonald of Dunnyveg and the Glens, the legal guardian of Marie MacLeod, who had previously demanded her return.

== Family ==
With his father, Kenneth received a remission in 1551 for the imprisonment of his cousin John Glassich Mackenzie (the son and heir of Hector Roy Mackenzie of Gairloch), who had died in mysterious circumstances in Eilean Donan Castle. It was said that John Glassich had intended to renew his father's claim to ancestral Mackenzie homelands in Kintail. Kenneth married in 1538 Lady Elizabeth Stewart, daughter of John Stewart, 2nd Earl of Atholl, by Lady Janet Campbell, daughter of the Archibald Campbell, 2nd Earl of Argyll. His own children also made very advantageous marriages:

- Colin Cam Mackenzie, who succeeded him, married Barbara Grant, daughter of John Grant of Grant.
- Roderick Mackenze of Redcastle married Florence, daughter of Robert Mor Munro, 15th Baron of Foulis
- Janet married, first, Aeneas Macdonald of Glengarry and, secondly, Alexander Chisholm of Chisholm.
- Catherine married Alexander Ross of Balnagown and died on 12 April 1592.
- Agnes married (contract 11 May 1567) Lachlan Mor Mackintosh, 16th of Mackintosh.
- Margaret married (contract 24 November 1556) Walter Innes, son and heir of John Innes of Inverbreckie, and died in June 1570.
- Elizabeth married Walter Urquhart of Cromarty.
- Marjory married (contract 30 May 1574) Robert Munro, son and heir of Robert Munro of Foulis.

== Death and burial ==
Kenneth is said to have died at Killin (or possibly Killen) on 6 June 1568 and was buried at Beauly Priory.

== Bibliography ==
- Alexander Mackenzie, History of the Mackenzies (Inverness, 1894)

Preceded by John Mackenzie	Chief of Clan Mackenzie c.1561–1568	Succeeded by Colin Mackenzie
