= Easter Kinkell =

Coordinates: 57.56589°N 4.37599°W

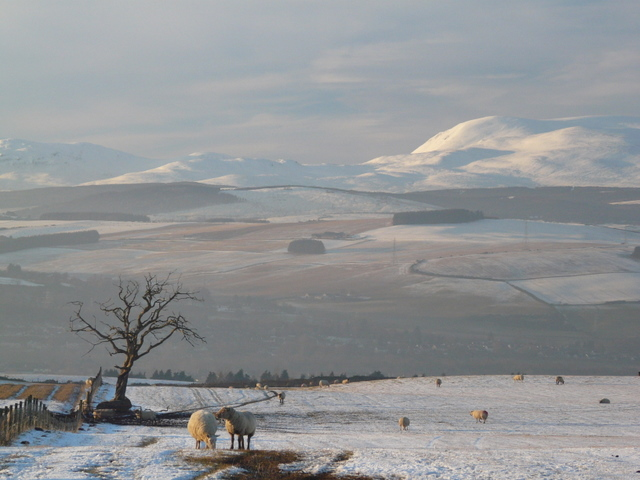
- Winter afternoon near Easter Kinkell Ben Wyvis in the distance

- Location within the Ross and Cromarty area
- OS grid reference: NH579553
- Council area: Highland
- Country: Scotland
- Sovereign state: United Kingdom
- Postcode district: IV7 8
- Police: Scotland
- Fire: Scottish
- Ambulance: Scottish

Easter Kinkell is a rural village, in the parish of Urquhart and Logie Wester, in the area known as Black Isle, in the county of Ross-shire, Scottish Highlands. It is also in the Scottish council area of Highland.

Newton of Ferintosh lies directly southwest of the village.
