= Kenneth Mackenzie, Lord Fortrose =

British politician

Kenneth Mackenzie, Lord Fortrose (1717 – 18 October 1761) was a Scottish politician and (by right of his ancestry) Chief of the Highland Clan Mackenzie.

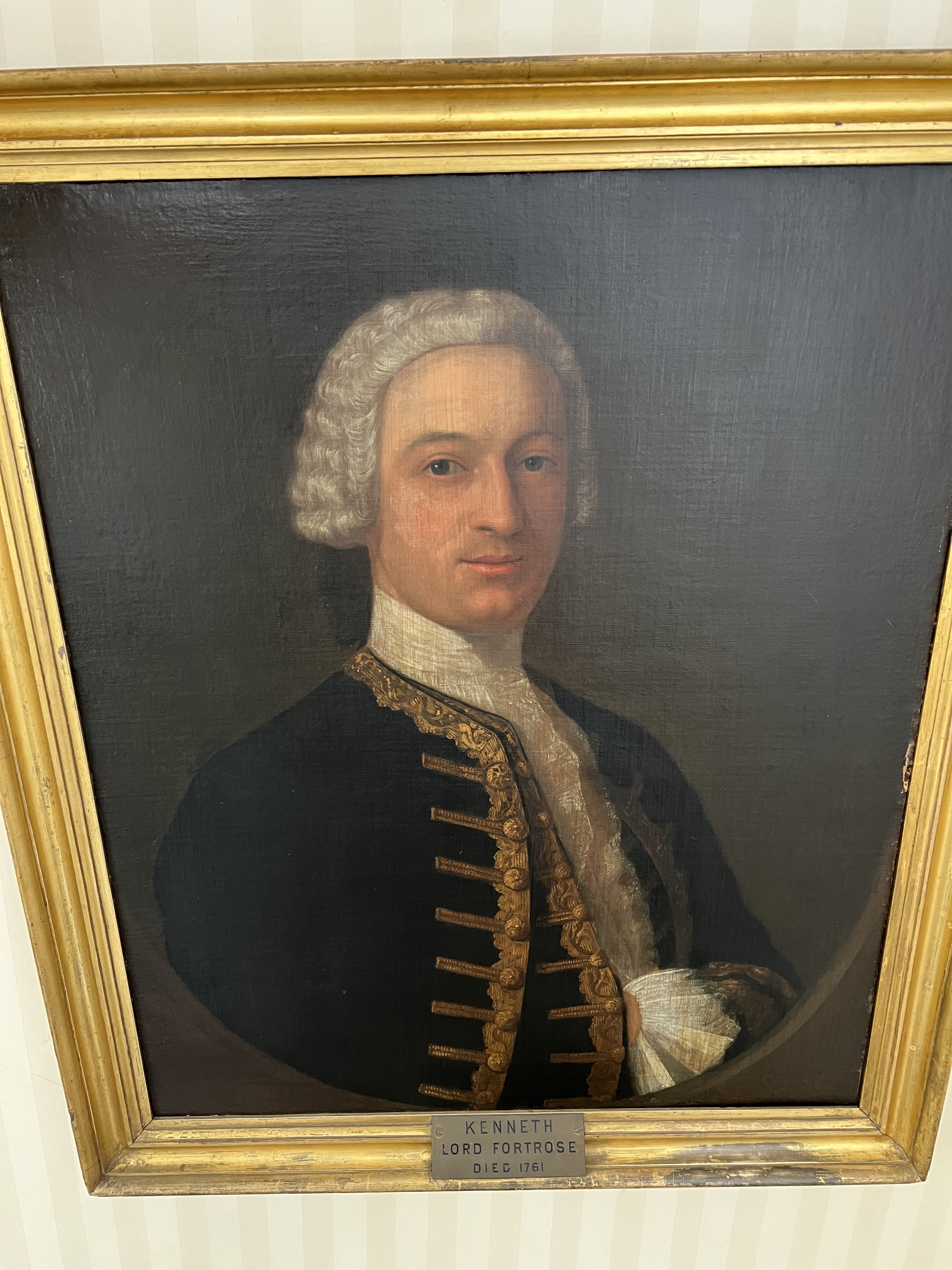
Kenneth Mackenzie, Lord Fortrose, poss. by Cosmo Alexander. Cushing House Collection, The Stoermer Family Trust.

== Origins ==
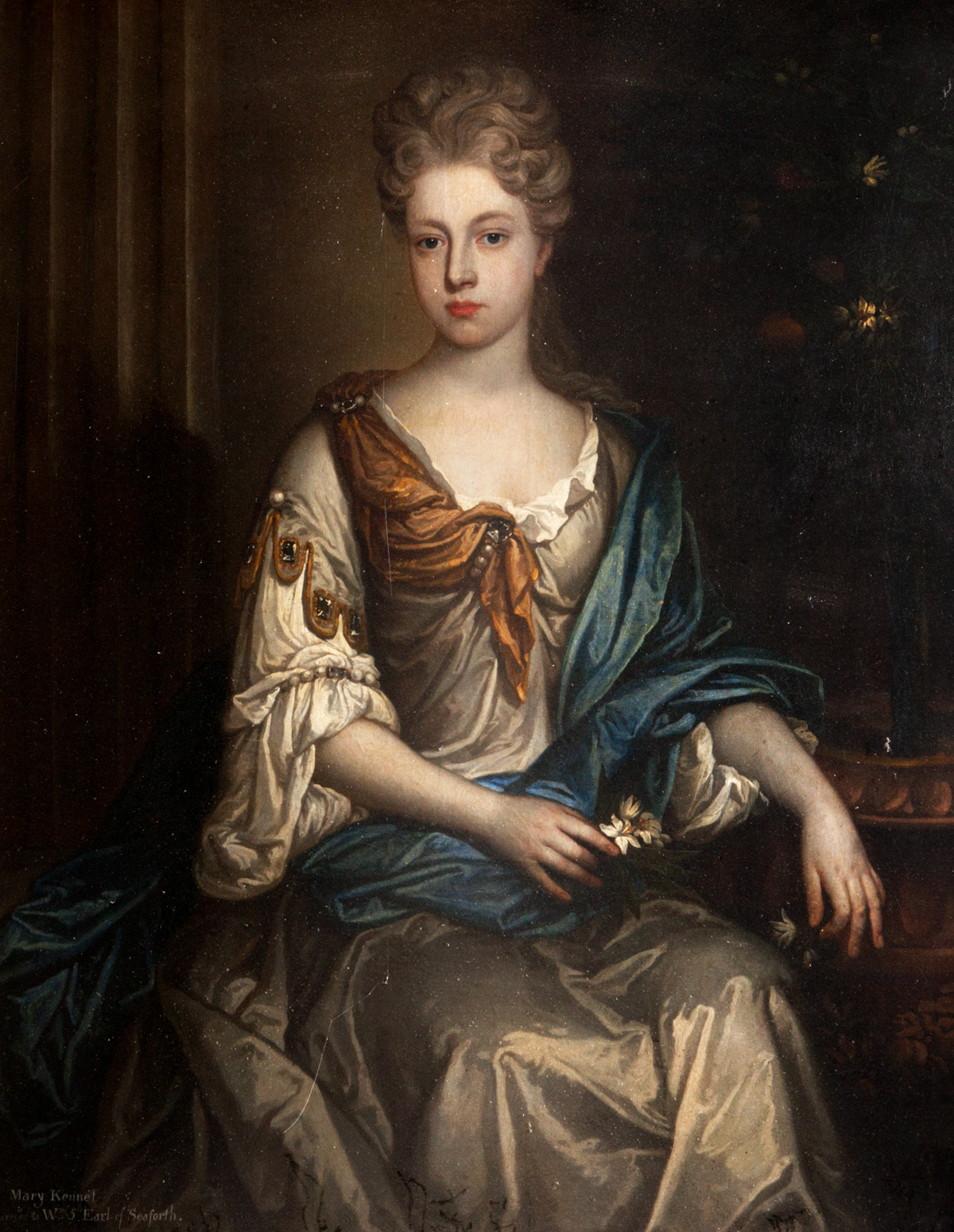
Kenneth Mackenzie's mother Mary (pictured) was the only daughter and heiress of Nicholas Kennet of Coxhoe.

Mackenzie was the eldest son of William Mackenzie, 5th Earl of Seaforth (died 1740) by his wife Mary, only daughter and heiress of Nicholas Kennet of Coxhow [Coxhoe in Kelloe parish, County Durham]. His father had taken part in the Jacobite rising of 1715 and had forfeited his estates and title under the Act of Attainder of 1716.

== Career ==
Mackenzie supported the Government during the Jacobite rising of 1745. He represented the constituencies of Inverness Burghs between 1741 and 1747, and Ross-shire between 1747 and 1761.

He died in London on 18 October 1761 and was buried in Westminster Abbey.

== Family ==
Mackenzie married (11 September 1741) Mary, eldest daughter of Alexander Stewart, 6th Earl of Galloway. She died on 10 April 1751 and is buried at St Mary Abbots Church, Kensington.

Their children were:

- Kenneth Mackenzie, 1st Earl of Seaforth (15 January 1744 – 27 August 1781), who married, first, Lady Caroline Stanhope and, second, Harriet Lamb; he had one child from his first marriage.
- Margaret Mackenzie, who married (4 June 1785) William Webb, no known children.
- Mary Mackenzie (died 29 January 1826), who married Henry Howard and had one child.
- Agnes Mackenzie, who married J. Douglas, one child.
- Catherine Mackenzie, who married (1 March 1773) Thomas Griffin Tarpley, had at least one child.
- Frances Mackenzie, who married Joseph Wall (later hanged for flogging soldiers to death), had children.
- Euphemia Mackenzie (25 January 1751 – 14 February 1817), who married William Stewart of Castle Stewart and had children.

Preceded by William Mackenzie	Chief of Clan Mackenzie; 1740–1761	Succeeded by Kenneth Mackenzie
Parliament of Great Britain
Preceded by Duncan Urquhart	Member of Parliament for Inverness Burghs; 1741 – 1747	Succeeded by Alexander Brodie
Preceded by Sir Harry Munro, Bt	Member of Parliament for Ross-shire; 1747 – 1761	Succeeded by James Stuart-Mackenzie
