= Chiefs of Clan Mackenzie =

The chiefs of the Scottish highland Clan Mackenzie were historically known as the Mackenzies of Kintail. By tradition the Mackenzie chiefs descend from Kenneth Mackenzie, 1st of Kintail (d. 1304) however their earliest ancestor proven by contemporary evidence is Alexander Mackenzie, 6th of Kintail (d. 1488). The chiefly line became the Earls of Seaforth during the 17th century but this title was later forfeited in the 18th century due to support of the Jacobite rising of 1715. The current official chief of the Clan Mackenzie is John Ruaridh Grant Mackenzie, 5th Earl of Cromartie.

== Chiefs – the Caberféidh ==
=== The Blunt-Mackenzies ===
The current chief is John Ruaridh Grant Mackenzie, 5th Earl of Cromartie. His father was Ruaridh Grant Francis Blunt-Mackenzie, 4th Earl of Cromartie, who legally changed his surname to Mackenzie and was appointed chief of Clan Mackenzie by the Lord Lyon King of Arms in 1979. He therefore is the second modern 'chief'. Ruaridh was born a Blunt and later changed to Blunt-Mackenzie. His mother Sibell Lilian Sutherland-Leveson-Gower, Countess of Cromartie, married Colonel Blunt, and he inherited his titles and Mackenzie descent through her. (Even she only claims a Mackenzie descent as a 4th great-granddaughter of George Mackenzie, 3rd Earl of Cromartie). The Earl of Cromartie still owns lands in clan country, however the largest remaining Mackenzie landowner by some margin is Mackenzie of Gairloch, with an estate which extends to over 50,000 acres. Like the clan chief, Mackenzie of Gairloch has inherited his clan name and lands through the female line. The last acknowledged chief through agnatic seniority (i.e. male sibling descent) was James Fowler Mackenzie, VIth of Allangrange (died 1907).

== Ancestry ==
Ancestors of Chiefs of Clan Mackenzie

32. Sir Henry Blunt, 2nd Baronet
65. Sir John Blunt, 1st Baronet
16. Walter Blunt
8. Major-General Charles Harris Blunt
4. Lt.Col. Edward Walter Blunt
2. Roderick Grant Francis Blunt-Mackenzie, 4th Earl of Cromartie
20. George Sutherland-Leveson-Gower, 3rd Duke of Sutherland
10. Francis Mackenzie Sutherland Leveson-Gower, 2nd Earl of Cromartie
42. John Mackenzie-Hay of Newhall and Cromarty
21. Anne Hay-Mackenzie
43. Anne Gibson-Craig
5. Sibell Liliian Mackenzie, Countess of Cromartie
11. Hon Lady Janet MacDonald
1. John Ruaridh Grant Mackenzie, 5th Earl of Cromartie

=== Direct descent through female line ===
The following is a list of some of the previous clan chiefs as listed by Alexander Mackenzie in his book A History of the Clan Mackenzie, published 1890. The last three, cited here, are disputed and the acknowledged chiefs were the Mackenzies of Allangrange; George Falconer Mackenzie, IVth of Allangrange; his son, John F.; and his younger brother, James Fowler Mackenzie (died 1907).

Name	Died	Notes
James Alexander Francis Humberston Mackenzie	1923	Of Seaforth, a Captain, 9th Lancers. The Lords Lyon ruled in a dispute with Mrs Beatrice Anna Fraser-Mackenzie of Allangrange that neither had the right to the undifferentiated arms of Mackenzie as neither were heirs-male of the clan.
Keith William Stewart Mackenzie	1881	Officer in the 90th Regiment and Colonel Commandant of the Rosshire Volunteers. Married firstly Hannah, daughter of James Joseph Hope, Vere of Craigehall. Married secondly Alicia Almeira Bell.
Mary Elizabeth Frederica Mackenzie	1862	Married firstly Sir Samuel Hood, MP for Westminster. Married secondly James Alexander Stewart of Glesserton, who assumed the name Mackenzie. Succeeded by her eldest son.

=== Historical undisputed line ===
Name	Died	Notes
Francis Humberston Mackenzie, 1st Baron Seaforth	1815	Later made Lord Seaforth and Baron of Kintail. Elected MP for the county of Ross in 1784 and 1790. Raised the Seaforth Highlanders. Succeeded by his daughter.
Colonel Thomas Frederick Mackenzie Humberston	1783	Killed by a gunshot wound while serving on the Ranger which was attacked by the Maratha. Captain in the 78th Rosshire Highland Regiment. Succeeded by his brother.
Kenneth Mackenzie, 1st Earl of Seaforth (second creation)	1781	Created Earl of Seaforth, Viscount Fortrose and Baron of Ardelve in the Peerage of Ireland. Known as the "Little Lord" due to his small stature. Succeeded by his cousin.
Kenneth Mackenzie, Lord Fortrose	1761	Did not openly support the Jacobite Stewarts. Married Mary, daughter of Alexander Stewart, 6th Earl of Galloway. Buried at Westminster Abbey.
William Mackenzie, 5th Earl of Seaforth	1740	Jacobite. Present at the Battle of Sheriffmuir and the Battle of Glenshiel, escaped to France on both occasions. Married Mary, daughter of Nicholas Coxhow of Northumberland. Titles forfeited. Died on the Isle of Lewis.
Kenneth Mackenzie, 4th Earl of Seaforth	1701	Fought at the Battle of the Boyne. Married Frances, daughter of William Herbert, Marquess of Powis (An English nobleman). Died in Paris.
Kenneth Mackenzie, 3rd Earl of Seaforth	1678	Imprisoned by Oliver Cromwell, released upon the Restoration of Charles II. Married Isobel Mackenzie, daughter of John Mackenzie of Tarbat, father of George Mackenzie, 1st Earl of Cromartie.
George Mackenzie, 2nd Earl of Seaforth	1651	Supported royalist James Graham, 1st Marquess of Montrose. Married Barbara, daughter of Arthur Lord Forbes. Died in Holland.
Colin Mackenzie, 1st Earl of Seaforth	1633	Built Brahan Castle. Married Margaret, daughter of Alexander Seton, 1st Earl of Dunfermline. Succeeded by his brother.
Kenneth Mackenzie, 1st Lord Mackenzie of Kintail	1611	Feuded with the MacDonalds of Glengarry. Married firstly Ann, daughter of George Ross of Balnagowan. Secondly Isabel, daughter of Gilbert Ogilvy of Powrie
Colin Mackenzie, 11th of Kintail	1594	Feuded with the Munros over ownership of the Chanonry of Ross. Feuded with the MacDonalds of Glengarry over the lands of Lochalsh, Lochcarron and Lochbroom. Married Barbara, daughter of John Grant, 4th of Freuchie (d. 1585).
Kenneth Mackenzie, 10th of Kintail	1568	Killed fighting for Mary, Queen of Scots. Married Elizabeth, daughter of John Stewart, Earl of Atholl. Buried at Beauly Priory.
John Mackenzie, 9th of Kintail	1561	Feuded with his kinsman, Hector Roy Mackenzie of Gairloch. Captured at Flodden Field but later escaped. Captured at Pinkie Cleugh but a ransom was paid for his release. Married Elizabeth, daughter of John Grant, 2nd of Freuchie (d. 1528).
Kenneth Og Mackenzie, 8th of Kintail	c.1497	Killed by the Laird of Buchanan. Succeeded by his brother.
Kenneth Mackenzie, 7th of Kintail	1492	Fought at the Battle of Park. Married Margaret, daughter of John of Isla.
Alexander Mackenzie, 6th of Kintail	1488	Married a daughter of MacDougall of Lorn.

=== Traditional chiefs ===
Name	Died	Notes
Murdoch Mackenzie, 5th of Kintail		"Of the bridge". Fought in support of Donald of Islay, Lord of the Isles at Harlaw. Made an alliance with the Clan MacRae.
Murdoch Dubh Mackenzie, 4th of Kintail	1375	"Of the cave". Married a daughter of the chief of Clan MacAulay.
Kenneth Mackenzie, 3rd of Kintail	1346	Executed at Inverness for rebelling against the Earl of Ross.
Ian Maccoinnich Mackenzie, 2nd of Kintail	1328	Supported Robert the Bruce.
Kenneth Mackenzie, 1st of Kintail	1304	Married Morna, daughter of MacDougall of Lorn.

=== Direct descent through male line ===
The question of the legitimate heir-male of the Mackenzie Clan chiefs is most contentious: the Mackenzies of Allangrange were acknowledged as chiefs, both by election (in 1829, of George F. Mackenzie by jury) and being considered the heirs-male of the clan by the Lord Lyon, as their progenitor was Simon Mackenzie of Lochslinn. Colin Cam Mackenzie's son, Kenneth Mor Mackenzie, Lord Mackenzie of Kintail, was father to both Colin (1st Earl of Seaforth), George (2nd Earl) and Simon of Lochslinn, (his seventh son).

Colin Cam Mackenzie was father of Alexander Mackenzie, of Coul & Applecross, who was in turn, father of Hector Mackenzie, of Assynt (extinct); Roderick Mackenzie, 1st of Applecross (extinct); and Kenneth Mackenzie, 1st Bart of Coul (Peter Douglas Mackenzie, XIIIth Bart. of Coul, Ross, 28 Jul 1990). Alexander Mackenzie, of Coul & Applecross was a 'natural son' i.e., illegitimate.

Colin Cam Mackenzie other sons included; Kenneth Mor Mackenzie, Lord Mackenzie of Kintail, who succeeded his father as Chief and from whom the Earls of Seaforth, acknowledged Chiefs of Clan Mackenzie, spring; Colin Mackenzie, of Kennock & Pitlundie; Murdoch Mackenzie, 1st of Kernsary; and the aforementioned Roderick (Sir) Mackenzie, Knight of Tarbat (Roderick of Coigeach, the "Tutor of Kintail"), from whom the Earls of Cromartie and the current Chief (in the female line), descends; Roderick (Sir) Mackenzie, Knight of Tarbat (ancestor of the Earls of Cromartie and Mackenzies of Scatwell); and Alexander Mackenzie, 1st of Kilcoy.

The Mackenzies of Scatwell claim descent through Kenneth Mackenzie, 1st of Scatwell, younger brother of John (Sir) Mackenzie, 1st Bt of Tarbat and father of George (Sir) Mackenzie, 1st Earl Cromartie (through whom the present Chiefs descends in the female line). The head of the Mackenzies of Scatwell, Tarbat is Dashwood George Roderick Barrett Mackenzie, 14th Baronet.

The Mackenzies of Kilcoy, descended from Roderick (Sir) Mackenzie, Knight of Tarbat's younger brother Alexander Mackenzie, 1st of Kilcoy and from whom the families of Kilcoy (extinct), Inverallochy, Findon (extinct), Kinnoch, Kernsary, Muirton (extinct), and Cleanwaters are descended.

The Mackenzies of Redcastle (extinct) and cadet branches, Kincraig (extinct), descend from Roderick Mor Mackenzie, Baron of Redcastle, a younger brother of Colin Cam Mackenzie, 11th Baronet of Kintail.

The eldest cadet line of Kintail are the Mackenzies of Hilton.

According to A.M. Mackenzie's History of the Mackenzies:

the following families are given in the order in which they branched off from the main stem of Kintail and Seaforth: Allangrange, Dundonnell, Hilton, Glack, Loggie, Gairloch, Belmaduthy, Pitlundie, Culbo, Flowerburn, Letterewe, Portmore, Mountgerald, Lochend, Davochmaluag, Achilty, Ardross, Fairburn, Kilchrist, Suddie, Ord, Highfield, Kedcastle, Kincraie', Cromarty, Ardloch, Scatwell, Ballone, Kilcoy, Castle Fraser, Glenbervie, Applecross, Coul, Torridon, Delvine, and Gruinard.

The Mackenzies of Allangrange succeeded F.H. Mackenzie as chiefs, upon the latter's death in 1815.

Name	Died	Notes
James Fowler Mackenzie	1907	Brother of John, died unmarried.
John Falconer Mackenzie	1849	John Fowler Mackenzie of Allangrange, as lineal representative of Simon Mackenzie of Lochshin, seventh son of Kenneth, first Lord Mackenzie.
George Falconer Mackenzie	1829	Elected Chief by Jury, at Tain in 1829

The next collateral branch of Clan Mackenzies closest to the Allangrange family are The Old Mackenzies of Dundonnel, descended from the Hon. Simon Mackenzie of Lochslinn by his second wife, Agnes Fraser. The last of this branch was Thomas, the eighth of Dundonnel (old) and John Hope Mackenzie, third son of Thomas, (the sixth) predeceased him in 1892. The only members of this family whose descendants can ever now by any possibility succeed to the Chiefship should it pass from the Mackenzies of Allangrange are (1) Alexander, second son of Kenneth Mor, first of Dundonnel, but of him there is no trace for more than two hundred years, and never likely to be. (2) Simon, Alexander's youngest brother, of whom nothing has been heard during the same period. (3) Captain Alexander, of the 73rd Regiment, second son of Kenneth Mackenzie, II. of Dundonnel, who died, probably unmarried, in 1783. In any case there is nothing known of any descendants. (4) Kenneth, W.S., second son of Kenneth Mackenzie, III. of Dundonnel, who died in 1790, and is not known to have been married. (5) William, third son of the same Kenneth, an Episcopalian minister, who was married, and left issue, of whom, however, we know nothing. (6) Roderick, William's immediate younger brother, and third son of the same Kenneth Mackenzie, III. of Dundonnel, who was also married, with issue, but whether extinct or not we cannot say. (7) Captain Simon, who was married and died in Nairn in 1812, but of his descendants, if any, we at present know nothing. (8) Captain Lewis, who died in India, probably, unmarried, but this has not been conclusively established; and (9) Thomas, second son of Thomas, VI. of Dundonnel, who in early life emigrated to California, and regarding whom nothing has since been heard. If he is still alive or has left any surviving male issue the late John Hope Mackenzie could not have succeeded as head of the family, and Thomas, or his male heir, if now in life, occupies that position; and on the failure of the Mackenzies of Allangrange, he or his representative will become Chief of the Mackenzies. The male line of the Allangrange, family became extinct in 1907 by the death of James Fowler Mackenzie. He entailed his, estates on the respondent, who was it cousin and had married it Fraser of Bunchrew. The entail contained a name and arms clause binding the heirs of entail to assume the name and bear the arms of Mackenzie of Allangrange.

The eldest cadet branch of Clan Kenneth are Mackenzies of Hilton, descended from Alexander Mackenzie, VI. of Kintail, known among the Highlanders as "Alastair Ionraic". His only son and heir, Allan Mackenzie, second of Hilton, Loggie or Brea, from whom the family is known in Gaelic as "Clann Alain", but by his second son John, Mackenzies of Loggie. The main line was extinct upon the death of Alexander Mackenzies, 10th of Hilton and was succeeded by Roderick Mackenzie, I. of Brea, Chamberlain of Ferintosh, second son of Colin, by his wife Mary Simpson, third son of Murdoch, V. of Hilton, all the intermediate male heirs having, as has been shown, become extinct. XIV. Kenneth Mackenzie, who recently resided at Tyrl-Tyrl, Taralga, near Sydney, New South Wales. He married his cousin, Mary James, daughter of Captain Alexander Mackenzie of Brea, second son of Alexander, XI. of Hilton, with issue including sons John (heir) and Downie, in Australia at the turn of the 19th century.

The Mackenzies of Glack are descended from Roderick, second son of Colin, third son of Murdoch Mackenzie, V. of Hilton, or rather from his second son. Roderick, Chamberlain of the Lewis. This Roderick had three sons—(1) John Mackenzie, I. of Brea, who carried on the male line of Hilton; (2) Colin, from whom the Mackenzies of Glack. The Rev. Duncan Campbell Mackenzie, Vicar of Shephall, Herts, 5th of Glack who was born on 6 January 1824, and married on 31 January 1854, Louisa, daughter of the late Lieutenant-Colonel Nicolls, of Chichester, with issue—1. Donald, an officer in the Marines. 2. Allan, an officer in the Ross-shire Militia, later Mackenzie-Penderel and 3. Malcolm.

The Mackenzies of Loggie: extinct

The Mackenzies of Gairloch are descended from Alexander Mackenzie, VI. of Kintail, by his second wife Margaret, daughter of Roderick Macdonald, III. of Moydart and Clanranald, the famous "Ruairidh MacAlain". Sir Hector David Mackenzie, 8th Baronet, assumed the surname Inglis. His grandson Sir Roderick John Inglis is 10th Baronet. Other branches of the Mackenzies of Gairloch include:

Branch	Mackenzie Baronet in order of creation
Mackenzie of Lochend	Extinct
Mackenzie of Letterewe	Extant in 1890 viz.John Alexander Mackenzie, of Ardlair, Edinburgh
Mackenzie of Mornish	JOHN ALEXANDER HUGH MUNRO MACKENZIE OF MORNISH (1974)
Mackenzie of Portmore	
Mackenzie of Inverness	
Mackenzie of Dingwall	
Mackenzie of Mountgerald	Extinct
Mackenzie of Dailuaine	Heir-male (Thomas Mackenzie, of Dailuaine Whisky fame) dies in 1915, though brothers in S. Africa, California but unmarried at the turn of the 19th century.
Mackenzie of Belmaduthy	
Mackenzie of Flowerburn	
Mackenzie of Pitlundi and Culbo	

== See also ==
- Kermac Macmaghan, apparent ancestor of the clan
