= Battle of Blar Na Pairce =

Scottish clan battle between 1485 and 1491

Coordinates: 57°34′36″N 4°33′13″W

Battle of Blar na Pairce
- Part of Rebellion of Dòmhnall Dubh
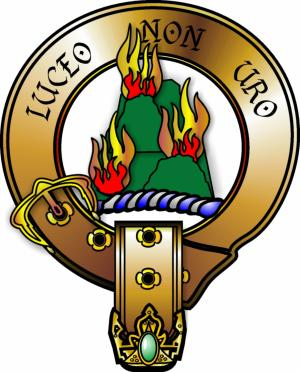
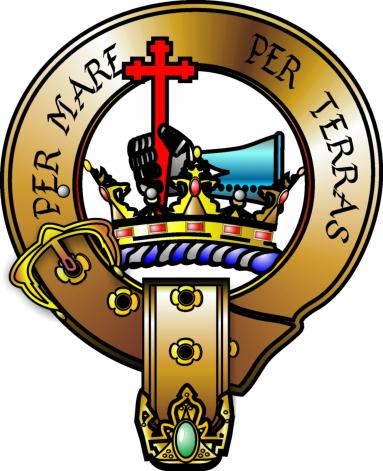
- Clan crests of Clan Mackenzie (left) and Clan Donald (right)
Date	Between 1485 and 1491
Location	Blar na Pairce, Strathpeffer, Scotland grid reference NH47325690
Result	Crown (Scottish) victory

Belligerents
Kingdom of Scotland: Clan Mackenzie; Clan Brodie	Lordship of the Isles: Clan Donald

Commanders and leaders
Kenneth Mackenzie	Gillespick MacDonald

Strength
Unknown	Unknown

Casualties and losses
Unknown	Unknown

The Battle of Blar na Pairce (Scottish Gaelic: Blàr na Pàirce "Battle of the Park") was a Scottish clan battle that took place just outside Strathpeffer some time between 1485 and 1491. It was fought between men of the Clan Donald or MacDonald and the Clan Mackenzie (led by Kenneth Mackenzie).

The chief of Clan Donald, Lord of the Isles, had resigned the title of Earl of Ross to the king in 1477. After this the province of Ross was constantly invaded by the MacDonald islanders. As a result, a battle was fought between the Clan Donald islanders, led by Gillespick MacDonald against the Clan MacKenzie. The MacDonald islanders were defeated with many men being drowned in the River Conon.

== Bibliography ==
- Dagg, C (2007). Blar na Pairce, Highland (Contin parish), desk-based assessment and metal detecting survey, Discovery Excav Scot. Vol. 8. Wiltshire, England: Cathedral Communications Limited. p. 109.
- Mackenzie, Alexander (1894). History of the Mackenzies, with genealogies of the principal families of the name. Inverness: A. & W. Mackenzie. pp. 88-96.
