= Redcastle =

Ruined castle in Highland, Scotland

Coordinates: 57°30′48″N 4°21′57″W

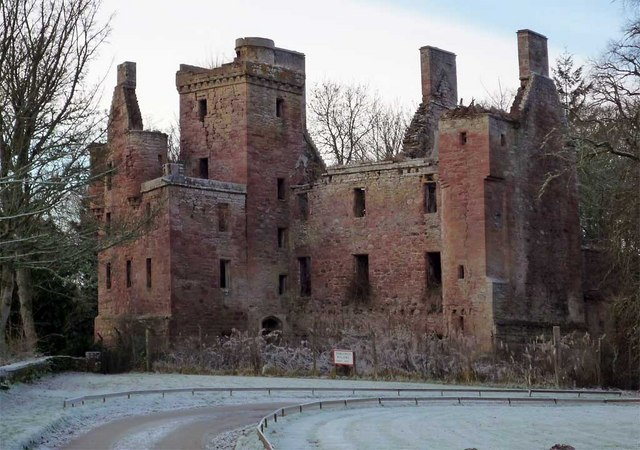
Redcastle

Location map of Redcastle

Redcastle (Scottish Gaelic: an Caisteal ruadh), historically known as Edirdovar and Ederdour, is a medieval castle in Killearnan on the Black Isle, northern Scotland. It is so named from the colour of the stone of which it is built. The castle is now in a state of ruinous disrepair, although it is protected as a category B listed building.

The structure has an L-shaped floor plan and is approximately three stories. It does not have a roof at this time.

== History ==
Redcastle was until relatively recently one of the oldest inhabited houses in Scotland. A castle on this site was first constructed by William the Lion in 1179 and was known as Edirdovar. The castle was held by Sir John Bysset 1230 and in 1278 by Sir Andrew de Besco. In 1455 the Black Isle was annexed to the Crown.

By 1492 the castle and its lands were under the control of Kenneth Mackenzie, 7th of Kintail, and they remained in the possession of Clan Mackenzie until 1790. The present building is dated 1641 but incorporates earlier work of rubble and ashlar masonry which is typically associated with older structures. Additionally, the castle was remodelled in the 19th century by William Burn. The estate was bought by Colonel H.D. Baillie in 1838 and passed into the ownership of the family of Lord Burton of Dochfour. The castle was requisitioned by the army during World War II and was finally vacated and part stripped in the 1950s.
