= Newton of Ferintosh =

Coordinates: 57.54614°N 4.37745°W

- Location within the Highland council area
- OS grid reference: NH578531
- Council area: Highland
- Country: Scotland
- Sovereign state: United Kingdom
- Post town: Conon Bridge
- Postcode district: IV7 8
- Police: Scotland
- Fire: Scottish
- Ambulance: Scottish

Newton of Ferintosh is a village on the Black Isle in the Highland council area of Scotland. It is between the villages of Tore and Maryburgh, alongside the A835 road.
