= Kenneth Mackenzie, 8th of Kintail =

Scottish nobleman

Kenneth Mackenzie (died c. 1498–1499), or "Coinneach Oig", traditionally reckoned 8th of Kintail, was a Highland chief, being head of the Clan Mackenzie.

== Origins ==
Kenneth was the eldest son of Kenneth Mackenzie, 7th of Kintail (d.1492) and (probably) Finvola, daughter of Gilleasbaig (or "Celestine") Macdonald of Lochalsh. The Mackenzies' origins lay in the Northwest Highlands, but the centre of their power had by the end of the 15th century shifted to Easter Ross.

== Career ==
Kenneth appears never to have been served heir to his father and the absence of contemporary references to him has resulted in doubt over his very existence. He is said, together with Ferquhard Mackintosh, 12th of Mackintosh, to have been made a hostage in Edinburgh by James IV, but to have escaped from the custody of the Crown. Not long afterwards, while at Torwood in Stirlingshire with Mackintosh, he was attacked and killed by the Laird of Buchanan. Mackintosh escaped death, but was imprisoned for many years, and Buchanan (an outlaw) was thereby returned to royal favour.

Kenneth left no legitimate issue and was succeeded by his half-brother, John Mackenzie, 9th of Kintail, who faced a fierce challenge for his inheritance from their uncle, Hector Roy Mackenzie of Gairloch.

Preceded by Kenneth Mackenzie	Chief of Clan Mackenzie; 1492–1498/99	Succeeded by John Mackenzie
