= Fairburn Tower =

Architectural structure in Highland, Scotland

Coordinates: 57°32′07″N 4°33′30″W

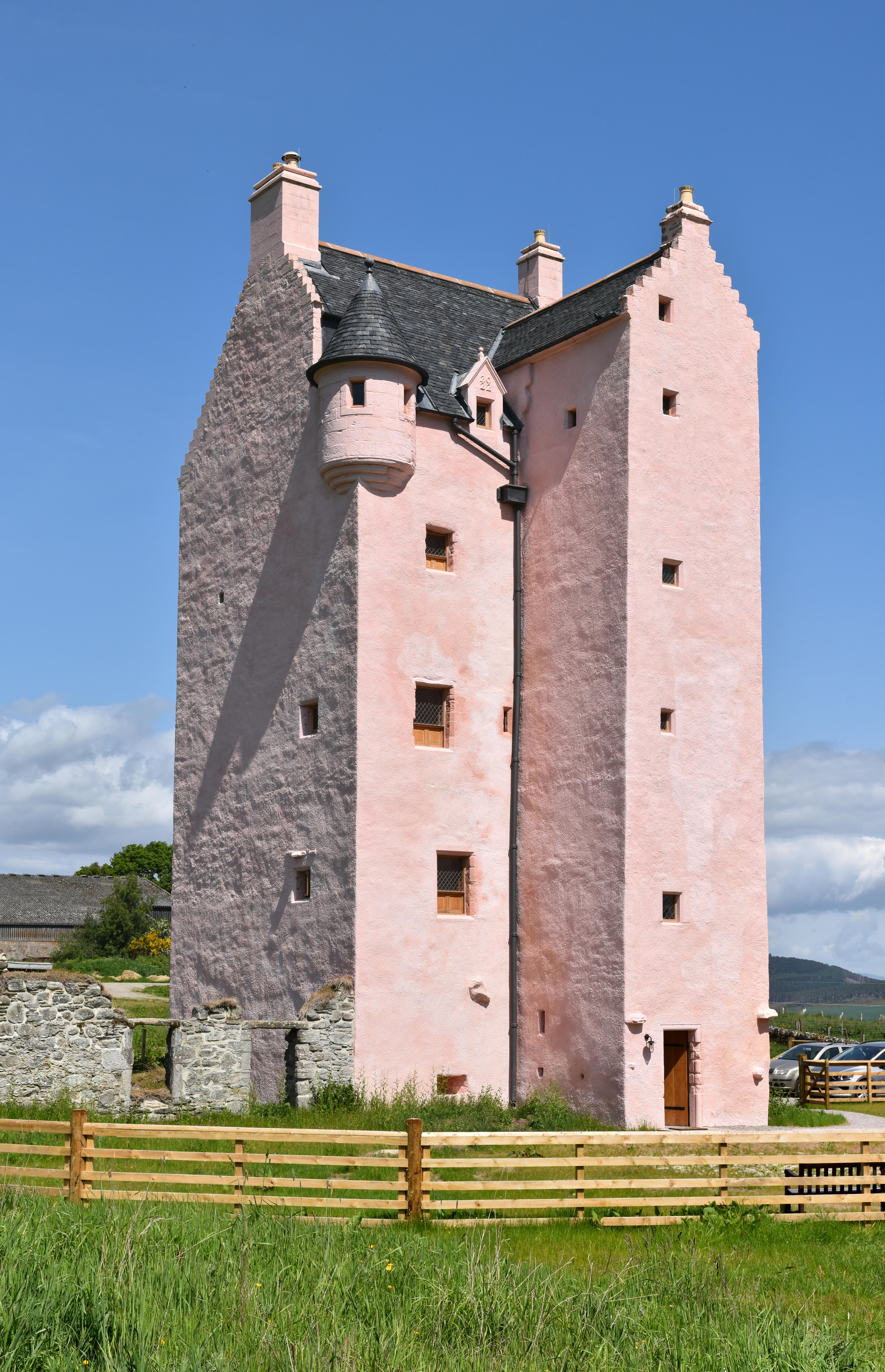
Fairburn Tower in 2023, after restoration

Fairburn Tower is a recently restored Scottish castle near Inverness and Muir of Ord in the parish of Urray.

The tower house on a hill above the River Orrin is believed to have been built in 1545 for Murdo Mackenzie.

== Mackenzie of Fairburn ==
Murdo Mackenzie (died 1590) was a son of Roderick (Rory) Mackenzie, and probably a nephew of John Mackenzie of Kintail. Rory Mackenzie, a nephew of Thomas Fraser, 2nd Lord Lovat, who died in 1533, owned nearby farms or townships at Comrie, Scatnell, and "Acheleis", and the mill at Contin. His mother is said to have been a daughter of Duncan McWilliam Dow vic Leod.

Murdo Mackenzie became a courtier, a groom or valet of the bedchamber for James V of Scotland from 1538. It is said that Murdo was sent to join the royal household after his father impressed the king in a wrestling match.

Murdo Mackenzie is recorded as a companion of the king in 1540 at Stirling Castle, Falkland Palace, and Dudhope Castle. On 30 April 1540 the king's pursemaster John Tennent gave him 22 shillings to buy gunpowder in Dundee for the king's handguns. Mackenzie, and three other grooms of the chamber, Alexander Kemp, Sandy Whitelaw, and Andrew Drummond, were given money for livery clothes in 1540, and their clothing allowance was increased. In June 1542 Mackenzie was given a gift of "composition" worth £113.

== Fairburn and its lands ==
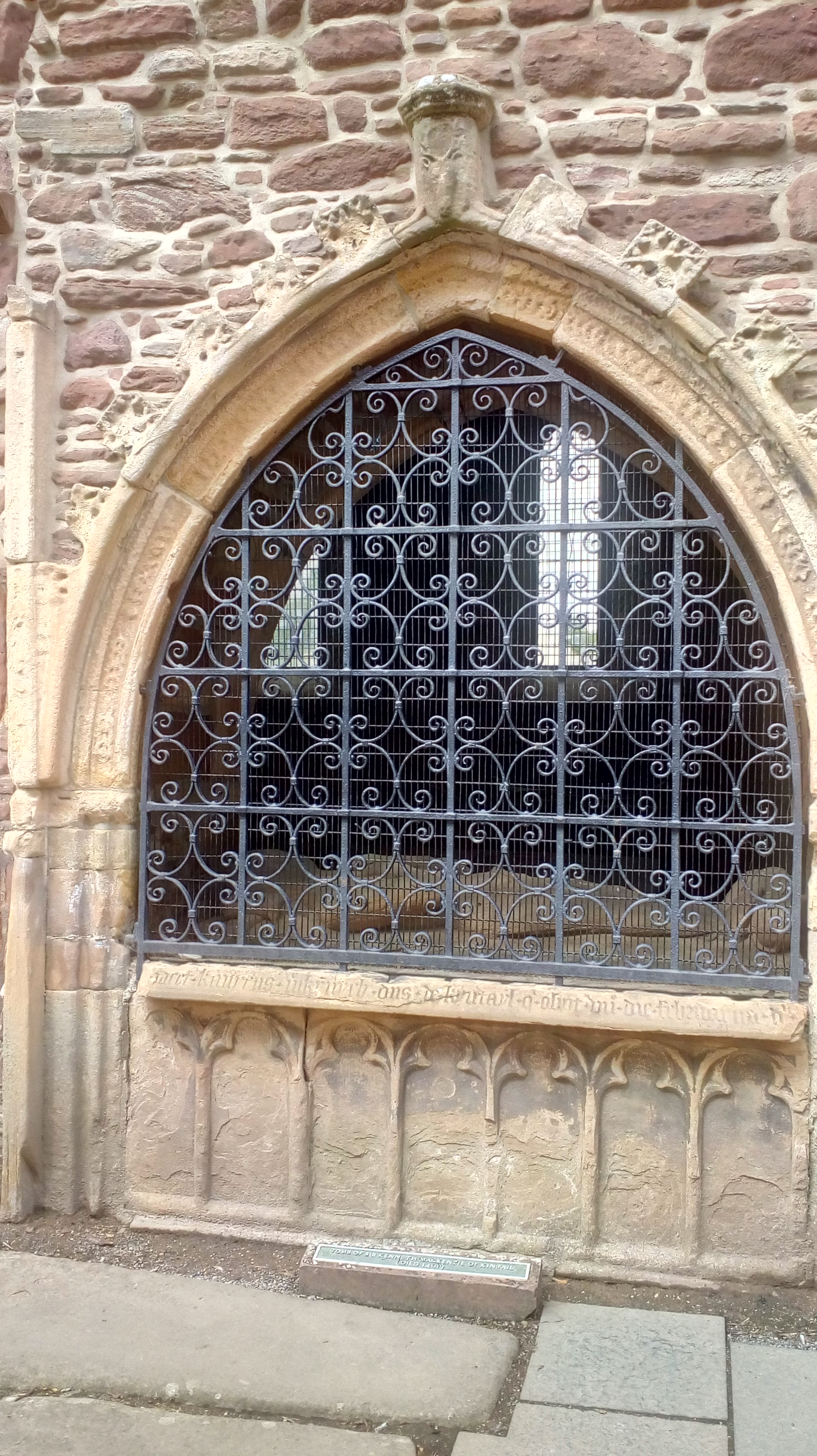
The tomb of Murdo Mackenzie's grandfather Kenneth Mackenzie at Beauly Priory in Inverness-shire

Murdo Mackenzie was granted the lands of Fairburn and other farms on 1 April 1542, and for the hearth of each homestead he was to pay the feudal duty of a hen, called a "reik hen." He was instructed to build a new house with orchards and a garden. After he married Mariobelle or Margaret Urquhart, in 1549 Mary, Queen of Scots gave him more land in the parish. A translation of Mackenzie's charter is given in the Origines Parochiales. Murdo Mackenzie died on 20 December 1590 and wished to be buried with his forebears in Beauly Priory.

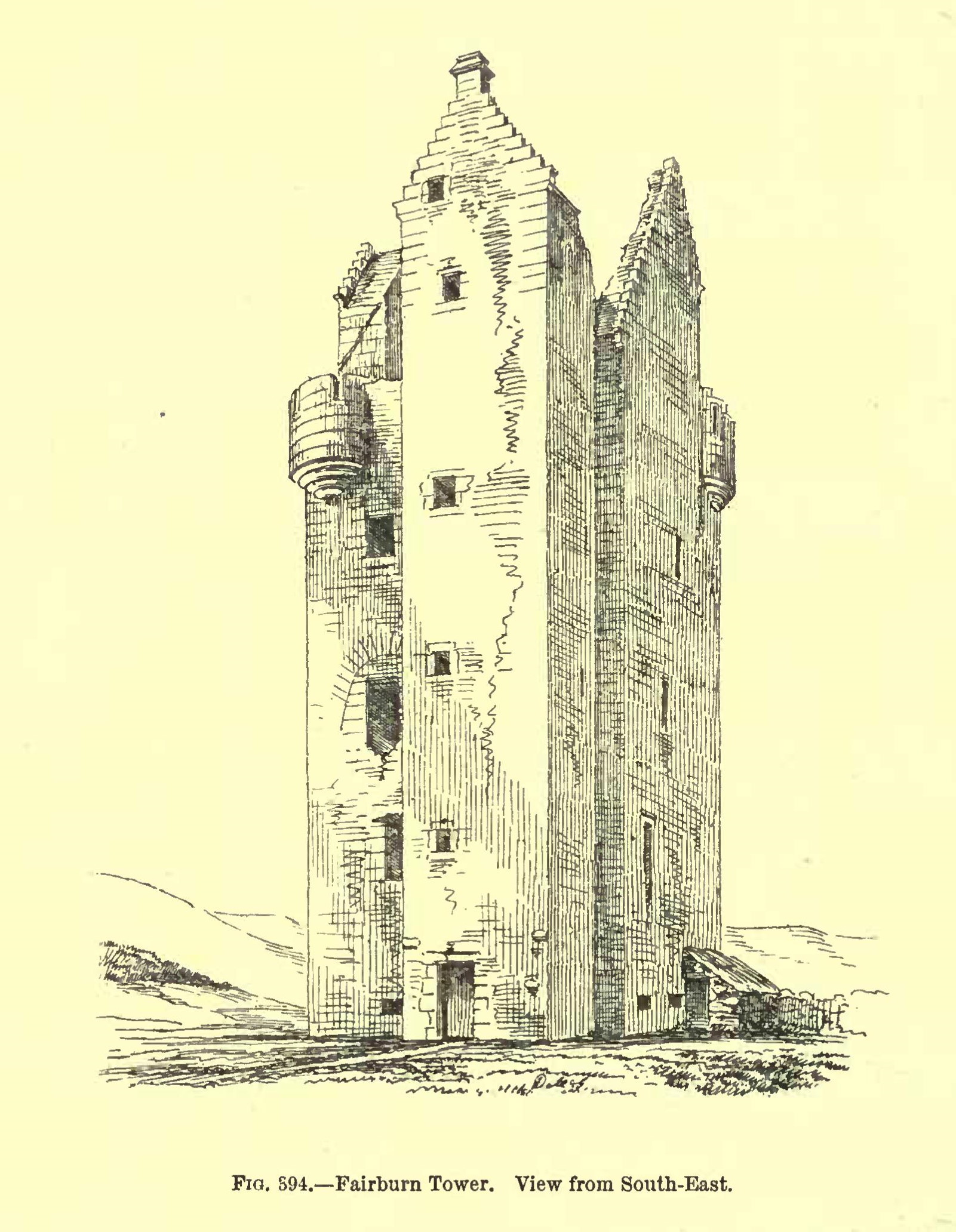
TheTower from the SE, showing the later stair wing and ground floor entrance (MacGibbon and Ross, 1887).

The original entrance was on the first floor, with an internal stair providing the only access to the vaulted ground floor chamber. A wing with a stair was added to the older tower in the 17th-century, providing a ground-floor entrance to the tower. There are shot-holes or gun-loops at ground-floor level and bartizans or turrets on wall heads.

The adjacent lands of "Wester Fairburn" were given to Andrew Keith, Lord Dingwall in March 1584.

The tower and the Mackenzie family were mentioned in the prophecies of the Brahan Seer, predicting the end of the family and the ruin of the building, and the apparition of a cow upstairs. The seer, Kenneth Ower or Coinneach Odhar, was executed for witchcraft at the Chanonry of Ross in 1578. The cow would calve in an upper chamber, the seòmar uachdarach, of the tower. A cow had a calf at the castle in 1851.

== Abandonment and restoration ==
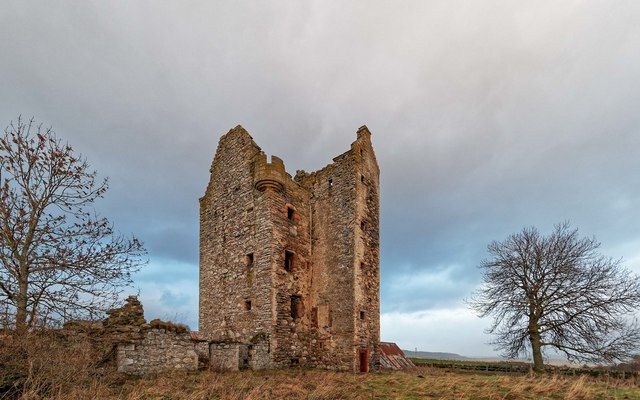
Fairburn Tower, a roofless ruin, in 2017

The tower was abandoned around the year 1780 and the roof, which was made with oak shingles, blew down in a gale in 1803. Hugh Miller, who heard stories of the Mackenzies from a woman called Isobel, known as "Mad Bell", described the ruin as a "ghastly spectre of the past".

Fairburn Tower is Category A listed by Historic Environment Scotland. It has been restored by the Landmark Trust, and is now available for holiday rental.

In May 2025, the tower was named as one of the winners of the annual Royal Incorporation of Architects in Scotland (RIAS) awards, and thereby longlisted for the RIAS Best Building in Scotland Award. The judges described the restoration as "beautifully accomplished, while also delivering characterful holiday accommodation". The restoration also received a 2025 RIBA National Award.
