= John Mackenzie, 9th of Kintail =

Head of the Clan Mackenzie

John Mackenzie (c. 1480-c. 1561), or "John of Killin", traditionally reckoned 9th of Kintail, was a Highland chief and head of the Clan Mackenzie.

== Origins and education ==
John was the son of Kenneth Mackenzie, 7th of Kintail (d. 1492) by his second wife, or reputed wife, Agnes Fraser. The Mackenzies' origins lay in the Northwest Highlands, but the centre of their power had by the end of the 15th century shifted to Easter Ross. John succeeded his half-brother, Kenneth (died 1498-99) in the chiefship while still a minor. It is likely that he achieved his majority in 1501, which suggests that he was born in about 1480.

John is said to have been sent to be educated at Court in Edinburgh (pursuant to the Education Act 1496, a legal requirement for boys in his station of life). However, the terms of a bond subscribed by him in favour of the Earl of Huntly suggest that he remained illiterate.

== Dispute over the chiefship ==
Mackenzie's uncle, Hector Roy Mackenzie of Gairloch, had been appointed tutor to Mackenzie's brother, Kenneth Mackenzie, 8th of Kintail, and on Kenneth's death was left in possession of the greater part of the clan lands. He challenged John's succession on the grounds of his illegitimacy, but was eventually compelled to come to terms with him. The traditional account records that John's men surrounded and set fire to Hector's house at Fairburn. More prosaically, Gregory's History of the Western Highlands and Isles of Scotland states that:

"Hector Roy Mackenzie, progenitor of the House of Gairloch, had, since the death of Kenneth Og Mackenzie of Kintail, in 1497, and during the minority of John, the brother and heir of Kenneth, exercised the command of that clan, nominally as guardian to the young chief. Under his rule the Clan Mackenzie became involved in feuds with the Munroes and other clans, and Hector Roy himself became obnoxious to Government as a disturber of the public peace. His intentions towards the young Laird of Kintail were considered very dubious; and the apprehensions of the latter having been roused, Hector was compelled by law to yield up the estate and the command of the tribe to the proper heir.”

Some traces of this dispute are to be found in public records of the time. An Act of the Lords of Council on 7 April 1511 described a summons issued by John against Hector Roy:

"...for the wrongous intromitting, uptaking, and withholding from him of the mails 'fermez', profits, and duties of all and whole the lands of Kintail, with the pertinents lying in the Sherrifdom of Inverness, for the space of seven years together, beginning in the year of God 1501, and also for the space of two years, last bye-past, and for the masterful withholding from the said John Mackenzie of his house and castle of Eilan Donan..."

The Act continues:

"The Lords of Council decree and deliver, that the said Hector has forfeited the keeping and constabulary of the said castle of Eilean Donan, together with the fees granted therefor... and the said John Mackenzie to have free ingress and entry to the said castle..."

Although John and Hector Roy appear ultimately to have made their peace, hostilities flared up again in the next generation. Hector Roy's son, John Glassich Mackenzie, is said to have renewed his father's claim to some or all of the clan's lands and died in mysterious circumstances in Eilean Donan. In 1551, John Mackenzie (9th of Kintail) and his son received a remission for his imprisonment.

== Estates ==
In April 1500 Mackenzie obtained a precept of clare constat (a feudal superior's confirmation of his vassal's entitlement to an estate) for Kintail and other lands from James Stewart, Duke of Ross. In 1504 he asserted an hereditary right to Meyne, Escadell [Eskadale] and other lands in Ross-shire. He is recorded also as having been a tenant of Kynellane [Kinellan], Scatell Mekill [Greater Scatwell], Scatell Beg [Lesser Scatwell], Kilquilladrum and Mylne of Coulle [mill of Coul]. On 25 February 1508/9 he had a charter of Kintail, Eilean Donan and other lands, incorporated in a free barony of Eilean Donan.

There is plentiful documentary evidence of Mackenzie's success over the years in expanding his estates. In 1526 he was infeft with his wife in the lands of Fothirte, Strathgarvy and Killyn [Killin]. He had charters of Killequhildrum on 25 September 1528, of Fotherty [Fodderty] on 25 May 1532, of Kinlochbanquhorie on 30 August 1538, of Laggan on 12 December 1540, of Meklebrawane on 15 September 1541, of Monare on 22 October 1542 and of Lochbryne (with his wife, in excambion for Fodderty) in 1543.

In 1544 he acquired half of Culteleod [Castle Leod] and Drynie from Magnus Mowat and Patrick Mowat of Bugholly and in January 1547 he acquired a wadset of the other half of those lands from Denoon of Davidston. In 1556 he acquired the heritage of Culteleod and Drynie from Denoon, which was confirmed to him by Queen Mary on 13 July 1556.

A number of grants were also made during his life to his son and heir, Kenneth.

== Public career ==
These territorial accretions reflected both the travails of Mackenzie's competitors and the full part played by him in the public life of his time. He fought at the Battle of Flodden on 9 September 1513 and is said in the traditional account to have been taken prisoner and to have subsequently escaped.

Be that as it may, Mackenzie was soon after appointed a lieutenant or guardian of Wester Ross in response to Sir Donald Macdonald of Lochalsh's arrogation of the Lordship of the Isles. In 1515, he seized the royal castle at Dingwall, but professed his willingness to surrender it to anyone appointed by the Regent, the Duke of Albany. In 1532, he was included in a commission by James V for suppressing disorder among the Clan Mackintosh.

On 13 December 1545, at Dingwall, the Earl of Sutherland entered into a bond of manrent with Mackenzie for mutual defence against all enemies, reserving only their allegiance to Queen Mary. Two years later, although by then an old man, he joined the muster called by the Earl of Arran at Musselburgh for the Queen's protection and took part in the Battle of Pinkie Cleugh, where he was again captured - and on this occasion released, after the payment of a considerable ransom.

Mackenzie died in 1561 and was buried at Beauly Priory.

== Family ==
Mackenzie married Elizabeth, said to have been a daughter of John Grant, 2nd of Freuchie. By her, he had a son, his successor, Kenneth Mackenzie, 10th of Kintail.

== Line of Chiefs ==
Preceded by Kenneth Mackenzie	Chief of Clan Mackenzie; 1498/99–c.1561	Succeeded by Kenneth Mackenzie
