= Bishop Kinkell =

Coordinates: 57.53416°N 4.44168°W

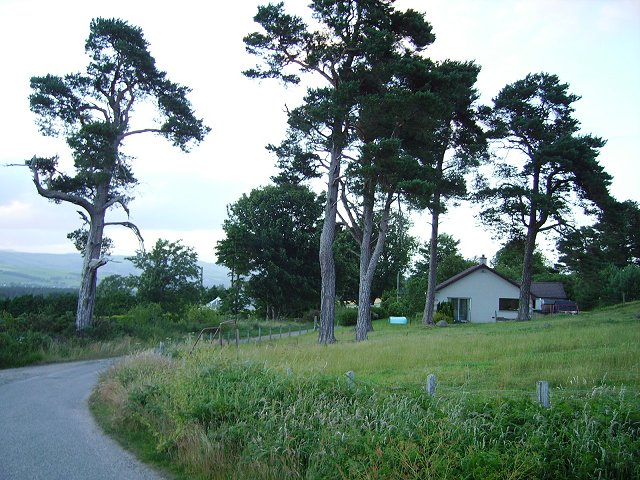

- Location within the Highland council area
- OS grid reference: NH539519
- Council area: Highland
- Country: Scotland
- Sovereign state: United Kingdom
- Postcode district: IV6 7
- Police: Scotland
- Fire: Scottish
- Ambulance: Scottish

Bishop Kinkell is a small scattered crofting hamlet 1.5 miles south of Conon Bridge in Inverness-shire, Scottish Highlands and is in the Scottish council area of Highland.
