= Urquhart and Logie Wester =

Scottish parish in Highland, Scotland

Coordinates: 57.57°N 4.39°W

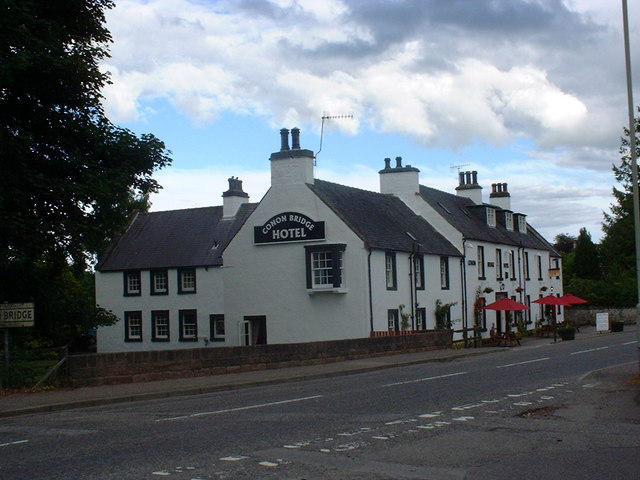
The village of Conon Bridge is the largest village in the parish of Urquhart and Logie Wester

Urquhart and Logie Wester is a parish within the historic county of Ross and Cromarty, Scotland. It is situated in the area known as the Black Isle and is in the Highland council area.

== History ==
The parishes of Urquhart and Logiebride were united to form one parish in 1845. Logiebride forms the western half of the parish hence Logie Wester, and Urquhart forms the eastern half. Both Urquhart and Logiebride previously had their own parish churches, both of which are now in ruins. However today there are several more modern churches in the parish of Urquhart and Logie Wester. The Battle of Logiebride took place in 1597.

A medieval parish and a parish for civil and religious purposes from the sixteenth century until 1975. The parish was initially an exclave of Nairnshire but was transferred to the new county of Ross and Cromarty in 1891 when the Local Government (Scotland) Act 1889 came into effect. The boundaries of the civil parish were also altered by the Boundary Commissioners in 1891.

The largest village within the parish is Conon Bridge. Other settlements within the parish include the village Easter Kinkell, the hamlet Bishop Kinkell and the small village Culbokie.
