= Kenneth Mackenzie, 7th of Kintail =

Kenneth Mackenzie (died 7 February 1492), traditionally reckoned 7th of Kintail and nicknamed Coinneach a'bhlair (or “Kenneth of the Battle”), was a Highland chief, being head of the Clan Mackenzie.

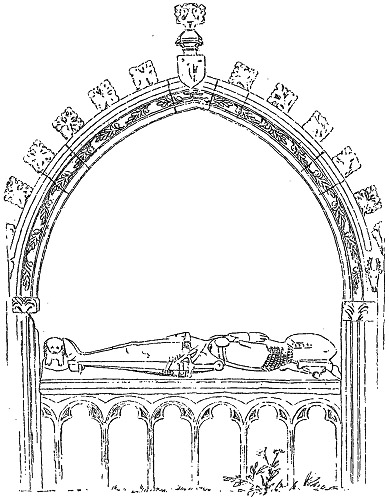
The earliest likeness of a Mackenzie - the effigy of Kenneth Mackenzie, 7th of Kintail located at Beauly Priory.

== Origins ==
Kenneth was the eldest son of Alexander Mackenzie of Kintail (d. 1488). The weight of traditional clan histories identifies Anna Macdougall as his mother, but this is rendered difficult by Alexander's supplication for dispensation in 1466, which recorded that he, Alexander, had been married for about thirty years to "Catherine, daughter of John, son of Ranald". Although traditionally identified as the 7th chief of the Kintail line, Kenneth was in fact only the second (after his father) of whom incontrovertible contemporary evidence survives.

== Career ==
Kenneth had a tack from the Crown before 1479 of Ardovale (Ardival), near Strathpeffer, and appears repeatedly in records as refusing to pay the fermes (feudal payments) for his land and defying the Crown's officers. In 1486 he also had a charter from the Earl of Ross of the lands of Meyne, the two Scatwells (Meikle and Little), Innermany (Invermeinie), Inverchoran, and Kinloch Beannacharain.

At some point between 1485 and 1491, Kenneth led a force of Mackenzies to victory over Alexander Macdonald of Lochalsh at the Battle of Blar Na Pairce.

He was served heir to his father in the lands of Kintail on 2 September 1488, at Dingwall, but died less than four years later on 7 February 1492. He was buried at Beauly Priory, where his tomb may still be found.

== Family ==
Kenneth appears likely to have married first Finvola, daughter of Celestine of Lochalsh and granddaughter of Alexander of Islay, Earl of Ross. He subsequently divorced her, having had by her a son and his heir, Kenneth Mackenzie, 8th of Kintail. He married secondly Agnes Fraser, who survived him. By Agnes, he had:

- John Mackenzie, 9th of Kintail, who succeeded his elder half-brother
- Alexander Mackenzie, ancestor of the Mackenzies of Davochmaluag
- Roderick (died 17 March 1533), ancestor of the Mackenzies of Achilty. He was probably the father of Murdo Mackenzie of Fairburn.
- Kenneth, priest of Avoch and vicar of Conveth and ancestor of the Mackenzies of Suddie
- Agnes, who married Roderick Macleod of Lewis
- Catherine, who married Hector Munro, 13th Baron of Foulis.

Preceded by Alexander Mackenzie	Chief of Clan Mackenzie; 1488–1492	Succeeded by Kenneth Mackenzie
