= George Mackenzie, 2nd Earl of Seaforth =

Scottish nobleman and Highland clan chief

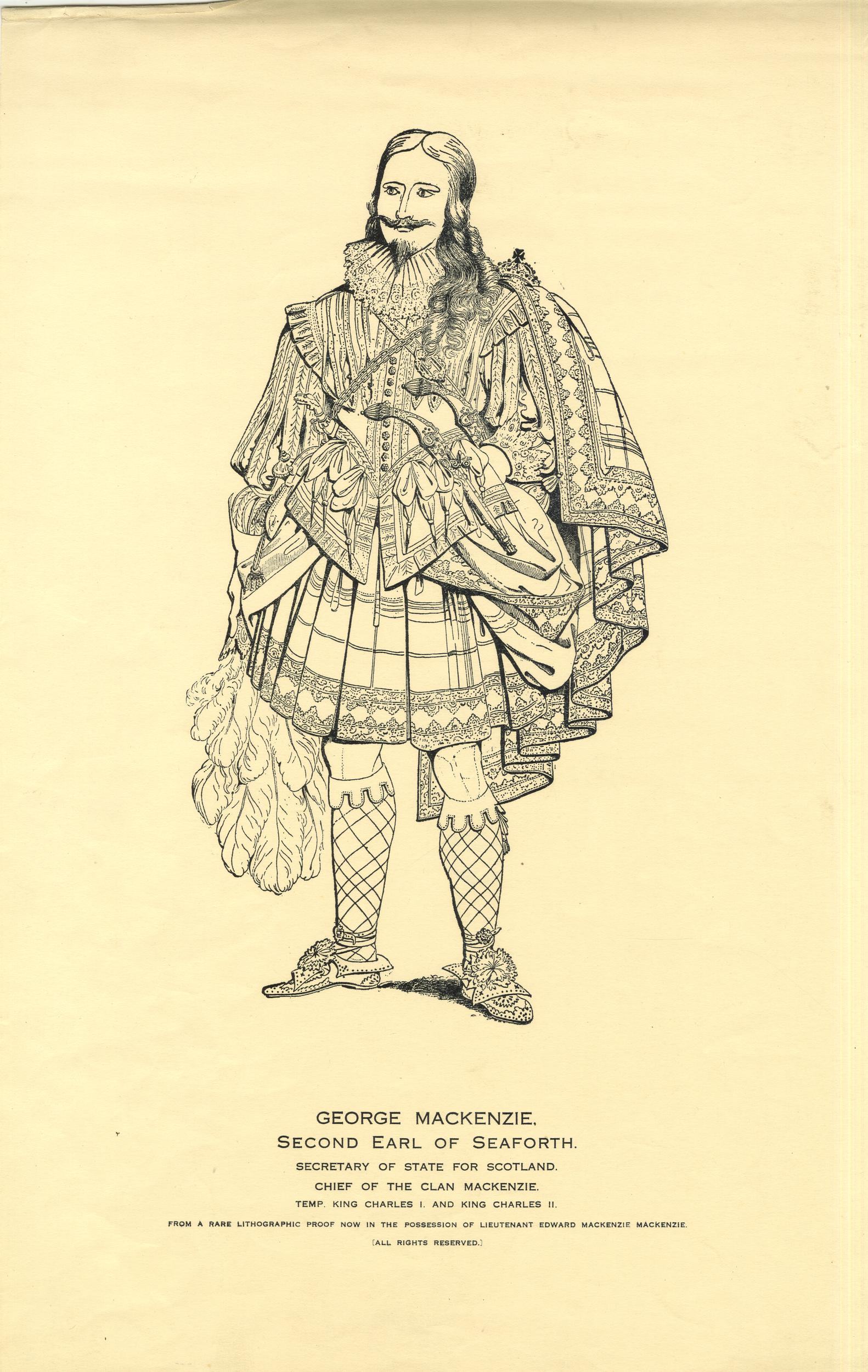
George Mackenzie, 2nd Earl of Seaforth

George Mackenzie, 2nd Earl of Seaforth (died 1651) was a Highland clan chief and Scottish nobleman, who played an equivocating role in Scotland in the Wars of the Three Kingdoms. His family was Clan Mackenzie.

== Origins ==
Mackenzie was the son of Kenneth Mackenzie, 1st Lord Mackenzie of Kintail (died 1611), and Isobel, the daughter of Sir Gilbert Ogilvie of Powrie. The Mackenzies were a clan from Ross-shire that had risen to prominence in the 15th century during the disintegration of the Lordship of the Isles.

On the death in 1633 of his elder half-brother Colin without male heirs, Mackenzie inherited his estates and the title of Earl of Seaforth. Prior to that point, he was known as George Mackenzie of Kildun.

== Estates ==
As a result of the acquisitive proclivities of Seaforth's ancestors, his estates were very extensive.

In 1633 he was "served heir male to his brother … in the lands and barony of Ellandonnan, including the barony of Lochalsh, in which was included the barony of the lands and towns of Lochcarron, namely, the towns and lands of Auchnaschelloch, Coullin (Coulin), Edderancharron, Attadill, Ruychichan, Brecklach, Achachoull, Dalmartyne, with fishings in salt water and fresh, Dalcharlarie, Arrinachteg (Arineckaig), Achintie, Slumba (Slumbay), Doune, Stromcarronach (Strome Carronach), in the Earldom of Ross, of the old extent of £13 6s 8d, and also the towns of Kisserin, and lands of Strome, with fishings in salt and fresh water, and the towns and lands of Torridan with the pertinents of the Castle of Strome; Lochalsh, Lochcarron, and Kisserin, including the davach of Achvanie, the davach of Achnatrait (Achintraid?), the davach of Stromcastell, Ardnagald, Ardneskan, and Blaad, and the half davach of Sannachan (Sanachan), Rassoll (Rassal), Meikle Strome, and Rerag (Reraig), in the Earldom of Ross, together of the old extent of £8 13s 4d." He was served heir male to his father Kenneth, Lord Mackenzie of Kintail, in the lands and barony of Pluscardine, on 14 January 1620; and had charters of Balmungie and Avoch, on 18 July 1635; of Raasay, on 18 February 1637 and of Lochalsh, on 4 July 1642.

== Civil War ==
In the Bishops War, Seaforth, although personally attached to the king, was to be found on the side of the Covenant. He was appointed General of the Covenanters north of the Spey, but disbanded his army on Montrose's instructions following the Pacification of Berwick, which concluded on 18 June 1639. When Montrose joined the king's side, Seaforth too was suspected of lukewarmness for the Covenant. In 1640, he was temporarily imprisoned as a precautionary measure and in 1641, when the King arrived in Scotland, Seaforth was persuaded by the Earl of Traquair to enter into a bond with the Earls of Montrose, Wigtown, Atholl and Home against the Covenanters. However, he continued to equivocate, declining the king's offer of chief justice general of the Isles and taking up arms against Montrose after his victory at Aberdeen in September 1644.

Montrose (with an army of only 1,500) was preparing to attack his forces of about 5,000, when he was informed of Argyll's descent on Lochaber. Changing his route, Montrose won a famous victory at Inverlochy against Argyll on 2 February 1645. Following this victory, Seaforth met Montrose between Elgin and Forres and was held prisoner for several days, but was subsequently released, having apparently sworn allegiance to the King and having promised never again under any circumstances to take up arms against him. Notwithstanding this promise, he shortly afterwards joined Sir John Hurry the Covenanting general. On 9 May 1645 he took part in the Battle of Auldearn, which was fought between Hurry's army of Sutherlands, Mackenzies, Frasers, Roses and Brodies and Montrose's army of Gordons, Macdonalds, Macphersons, Mackintoshes and Irish. The result was another victory for Montrose, but the Mackenzies emerged largely unscathed. The Reverend John Macrae (d. 1704) gave a lengthy account of the battle (in the Ardintoul manuscript) which suggested that there had been deliberate collusion between Montrose, Hurry and Seaforth.

Be that as it may, Seaforth subsequently refused a commission from the Committee of Estates appointing him as their Lieutenant north of the Spey and was excommunicated by the General Assembly. He then joined Montrose publicly at the siege of Inverness in April 1646.

== Clan affairs ==
After Montrose's departure for Norway in September 1646, compulsory loans were levied against leading Royalists. Sixteen Mackenzies were ordered to provide loans totaling £28,666 (Scottish), but it appears that the authorities experienced great difficulties in enforcing their payment. The list provides an interesting snapshot of the perceived resources of some of the leading clan members of the time:

- Thomas Mackenzie of Pluscarden: £2,000;
- Alexander Mackenzie of Kilcoy: £2,000;
- Roderick Mackenzie of Redcastle: £2,000;
- Alexander Mackenzie of Coul: £6,000;
- Kenneth Mackenzie of Gairloch: £3,333 6s.8d;
- Hector Mackenzie of Scotsburn: £2,000;
- Roderick Mackenzie of Davochmaluag: £1,333 6s.8d;
- John Mackenzie of Davach-Cairn: £1,333 6s.8d;
- William Mackenzie of Multavie: £1,000;
- Kenneth Mackenzie of Scatwell: £2,000;
- Thomas Mackenzie of Inverlael: £1,333 6s.8d;
- Colin Mackenzie of Mullochie: £666 13s.4d;
- Donald Mackenzie of Logie: £666 13s.4d;
- Kenneth Mackenzie of Assynt: £1,000;
- Colin Mackenzie of Kincraig: £1,000;
- Alexander Mackenzie of Suddie: £1,000.

Seaforth's involvement in public affairs did not prevent him from pursuing (in the manner of his forebears) his own more personal concerns. In particular, he embarked on a remorseless campaign to wrest Assynt from the Macleods, laying siege to the castle of Donald Ban Mor Macleod on the Isle of Assynt in May 1646. His men were said (in a later complaint by the Macleods) to have carried away 3,000 cows, 2,000 horses and 7,000 sheep and goats, as well as burning the habitations of 180 families.

== Final years ==
In 1648 Seaforth again raised a body of 4000 men in the Western Islands and Ross-shire, whom he led south, to aid the King's cause, but after joining in a few skirmishes under Lanark, they returned home to "cut their corn which was now ready for their sickles." During the whole of this period Seaforth's fidelity to the Royal cause was open to considerable suspicion, and when Charles I threw himself into the hands of the Scots at Newark, and ordered Montrose to disband his forces, Earl George, always trying to be on the winning side, came in to Middleton, and made terms with the Committee of Estates; but the Church, by whom he had previously been excommunicated, continued implacable, and would only agree to be satisfied by a public penance in sackcloth within the High Church of Edinburgh. The proud Earl consented, underwent this ignominious and degrading ceremonial, and his sentence of excommunication was then removed. Notwithstanding this public humiliation, after the death of Charles I, Seaforth, in a final act of tergiversation, went over to Holland in 1649, and joined Charles II, by whom he was made Principal Secretary of State for Scotland, the duties of which, however, he never had the opportunity of performing.

== Death and posterity ==
When Seaforth received the news of the disastrous defeat of the king's forces at Worcester, he fell into a profound melancholy and died in August 1651, in Schiedam, Holland.

Early in life, he had married Barbara, daughter of Arthur, Lord Forbes, and had by her at least eight children, including his heir and successor, Kenneth. Of his three daughters, Jean married first John, Earl of Mar, and secondly Andrew Fraser, 3rd Lord Fraser; Margaret married Sir William Sinclair of Mey; and Barbara married Sir John Urquhart of Cromarty.

== Line of Chiefs ==
| Preceded by Colin Mackenzie | Chief of Clan Mackenzie; 1633–1651 | Succeeded by Kenneth Mackenzie |

Peerage of Scotland
| Preceded by Colin Mackenzie | Earl of Seaforth; 1633–1651 | Succeeded by Kenneth Mackenzie |
