= Prior of Pluscarden =

The Prior of Pluscarden (later Commendator of Pluscarden) was the head of the monastic community and lands of Pluscarden Priory, Moray, Scotland. The Priory was founded in 1230 by King Alexander II of Scotland for the Valliscaulian Order. In March 1454 it incorporated the foundering neighbouring establishment of Urquhart Priory and became a dependency of Dunfermline Abbey, whence it became Benedictine. The following are a list of abbots and commendators:

== List of priors ==
- Simon [I], 1239
- Andrew, x 1275
- William, 1275
- Simon [II], 1280–1286
- John Suryass, 1291
- John Wysy, 1345–1346
- Thomas, 1367–1398
- Alexander de Pluscarden, 1398–1426
- "Eugenius Macfeturis" (Eóghann mac Pheadair), 1417-1428 x 1431
- David Cran, 1427–1428
- Andrew Symson, 1428-1439
- Richard Lundy, 1435
- William de Breneth, 1436–1449
- Andrew Haig [I], 1447–1454
- John Benally, 1454–1456
- William Boyce, 1457–1476
- Andrew Haig [II], 1469–1471
- David Ruch, 1474–1475
- Thomas Foster, 1476–1479
- Gavin Dunbar, 1479
- David Boyce, 1481–1482
- Robert Harwar/Herwot/Harrower, 1487–1509
- George Learmond (or George Learmonth), 1509-1529
- Alexander Dunbar, 1529–1560
- George Dunbar, 1561
- George Seton, 1561–1569
- William Cranston, 1562

== List of prior-commendators ==
- Alexander Seton, 1565-1587.
  - James Douglas, 1577–1581

== See also ==
- Pluscarden Priory
- Prior of Urquhart

== Bibliography ==
- Cowan, Ian B. & Easson, David E., Medieval Religious Houses: Scotland With an Appendix on the Houses in the Isle of Man, Second edition, (London, 1976), pp. 61, 84-5
- Watt, D. E. R. & Shead, N. F. (eds.), The Heads of Religious Houses in Scotland from the 12th to the 16th Centuries, The Scottish Records Society, New Series, Volume 24, (Edinburgh, 2001), pp. 178–82
