= Peter Love =

17th-century English pirate

- Born: Lewes, Sussex, England
- Died: 1610; Leith, Scotland
- Piratical career
- Rank: Captain
- Base of operations: around Ireland and Scotland
- Commands: Priam

Peter Love (died 1610) was an English pirate, said to have been born in Lewes, Sussex. He was the captain of the Priam, and for a time occupied a base on the Isle of Lewis, in the Outer Hebrides, when he entered into an agreement with the Hebridean outlaw Neil MacLeod.

From his base of operations on Lewis, Love captured numerous ships and seized their cargo. MacLeod, however, betrayed Love, and handed him over to the Scottish authorities. As a result, Love and several members of his crew were found guilty of piracy and condemned to be hanged in 1610. MacLeod did not much outlive Love, since he was betrayed by his kinsman Rory Mor MacLeod of Harris and Dunvegan, and was executed for high treason three years later.

== Background ==
Peter Love was stated to have been born in Lewes, Sussex, England, some time in the 16th century. He was a notable pirate of his era; his ship was called the Priam.

== Allegiance with the outlaw Neil MacLeod ==
Location of Bearasaigh.

According to early 20th-century historian William Cook Mackenzie, Love and the Priam had narrowly escaped capture off the coast of Ireland when he dropped anchor near Bernera, within Loch Roag, Lewis. The Priam was full of cargo which consisted of cinnamon, ginger, pepper, cochineal, sugar, 700 Indian hides, and 29 pieces of silver plate which had been looted from an English ship; a box, containing various precious stones of great value, which had been looted from a Dutch ship; as well as a large number of muskets. During this time a Hebridean outlaw dwelt in the immediate area. His name was Neil MacLeod, the son of Old Ruari, the late chief of the MacLeods of Lewis. MacLeod had for years been fighting various invading forces on Lewis. At the turn of the 17th century, the Fife adventurers had attempted to colonise the island, and later Kenneth Mackenzie of Kintail took over where they had left off. Mackenzie of Kintail was granted a commission of fire and sword by the government, and successfully took control of Lewis. However, MacLeod, and a small band of followers, took refuge and fortified themselves on the remote stack on the tiny island of Bearasaigh within Loch Roag. Bearasaigh is located at: grid reference NB1198542386.

The pirate Love and the outlaw MacLeod soon struck up a working friendship; after setting up a base in the area, and an agreement with MacLeod, the pirates resumed their trade and captured a (Lowland) Scottish ship, owned by Thomas Fleming (Ritchieson) of Anstruther, whom they detained as a prisoner. They also captured a Flemish ship, and transferred five of her crew to work as slaves, and replaced them with a similar number of pirates on board. This Flemish ship was later driven by bad weather onto the coast of Shetland, where the crew was forced to go ashore. Mackenzie related one account which stated that the friendship between Love and MacLeod was so strong that Love was about to marry a daughter of Torquil Blair MacLeod, who is described as Neil MacLeod's aunt. Mackenzie noted that this is obviously an error of some sort (as Torquil is a masculine name), and proposed that Torquil Blair may have been an illegitimate son of Old Ruari, the late chief of the MacLeods of Lewis. Later, the 20th-century clan historian Alec Morrison stated that Neil actually married the daughter of Torquil Blair MacLeod.

== Capture and execution ==
Neil MacLeod, however, betrayed Love, and during a feast attempted to seize the pirates. Some of the pirates were killed during a desperate scuffle, but Love and the Priam were captured by MacLeod and his men. The four Dutchmen who had been enslaved by the pirates were freed and sent across Lewis, and a Scotsman who was also enslaved was detained by MacLeod, who waited for instructions from the Privy Council.

According to tradition, there was an abundance of money aboard the Priam which was divided and lotted amongst MacLeod and his followers by using the helmet of Donald Cam Macaulay. Mackenzie noted that there is no mention of money in the official records found on board the Priam. Her cargo of spices were of little use to outlaws—but money was of great use. Mackenzie noted that MacLeod's capture of Love would have served two purposes: providing him with a wealth of money; and giving him a means of reconciliation with the Government.

MacLeod sent a messenger to inform the Privy Council. MacLeod's version of events, related to the Privy Council, was that he was not personally present during the seizure of Love and the Priam. According to Mackenzie, the reason that MacLeod distanced himself from the actual event was so that he could not be held responsible if his men were thought to have helped themselves to the loot. Mackenzie also considered it quite likely that when the Priam was finally handed over to representatives of the Government, anything of use to Neil and his men would not have been found on board.

Love and nine of his men were handed over to Patrick Grieve and were tried in Edinburgh on 8 December 1610. The men were a mixture of nationalities: Englishmen Johnne Cokis, Williame Hollane, Anthony Colenis, and Abraham Mathie; Welshmen Dauid Howart and Nicolas Phillopes; and Irishman Jasperd Staffurd. Mackenzie stated that the other two men handed over to Grieve appeared to have died of their wounds before the trial. The pirates were all found guilty and were condemned to be hanged on the sands of Leith ("To be tane to ane Gibbet vpone the Sandis of Leyth, within the fflodes-mark, and thair to be hangit quhill thay be deid ... ").

MacLeod did not last much longer than Love. In 1613, he was forced from his fortified stack and fled to Harris and the protection of his kinsman, chief Rory Mor MacLeod of Harris and Dunvegan. MacLeod of Harris and Dunvegan promised to take MacLeod to London, where MacLeod hoped he could obtain a pardon from the king. But upon reaching Glasgow, MacLeod of Harris and Dunvegan gave up MacLeod and his son, Donald, to the authorities. According to Mackenzie accounts, MacLeod of Harris and Dunvegan had only taken MacLeod to Glasgow under the pretence of taking him to the king. In the end, MacLeod was found guilty of high treason and hanged in April 1613; his son was banished to England.
