= Thomas Frederick Mackenzie Humberston =

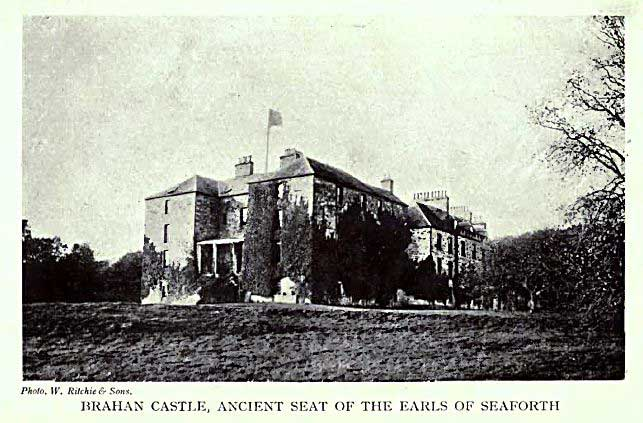
- Brahan Castle - seat of the Earls of Seaforth
- Born: 1753
- Died: 1783 (aged 29–30)
- Allegiance: United Kingdom
- Branch: British Army
- Service years: 1771–1783
- Rank: Lieutenant-Colonel (Commandant)
- Conflicts: Second Anglo-Mysore War

Thomas Frederick Mackenzie Humberston (1753 – 30 April 1783) was a British Army officer and Chief of the Highland Clan Mackenzie.

== Origins ==
Mackenzie was the eldest son of Major William Mackenzie (died 12 March 1770), by Mary, daughter and heiress of Matthew Humberston of Humberston, in Lincolnshire. His father was the son of the Hon. Alexander Mackenzie and grandson of Kenneth Mackenzie, 4th Earl of Seaforth.

On the death of his cousin, Kenneth Mackenzie, 1st Earl of Seaforth of the new creation, Mackenzie became the representative of the ancient house of Mackenzie of Kintail and the attainted Earls of Seaforth. Mackenzie adopted the additional name of Humberston on succeeding to his mother's property and purchased the remaining ancestral estates of the Earls of Seaforth from his cousin.

== Career ==
In 1771, Mackenzie was commissioned into the 1st Dragoon Guards. He became a lieutenant in 1775 and a captain in 1777. In 1778, during the American War of Independence, he helped his cousin, Lord Seaforth, to raise a corps of highlanders to fight in the war. The regiment, initially staffed by Clan Mackenzie officers, became the 78th Foot later that year. Mackenzie became a major in that regiment in 1779 and was present with five companies at the repulse of an attempted French landing in St Ouen's Bay, Jersey, on 1 May 1779.

In 1780, Mackenzie was transferred to the 100th Foot and promoted to the rank of lieutenant-colonel. On Lord Seaforth's death Humberston was transferred to the 78th regiment as lieutenant-colonel commandant in his place, 15 Feb. 1782. He subsequently served with distinction in India during the Second Anglo-Mysore War. In April 1783, the ship on which Mackenzie was travelling was attack by Maratha pirates, and he died on 30 April in Gheriah from the effects of wounds he had sustained. Mackenzie died unmarried but with an illegitimate son, Thomas B. Mackenzie Humberston. He died whilst serving as a captain in the 78th Ross-shire Buffs in 1803.

== Posterity ==
He was succeeded in the chiefship and in his estates by his younger brother Francis.

== Line of Chiefs ==
Preceded by Kenneth Mackenzie	Chief of Clan Mackenzie; 1781–1783	Succeeded by Francis Mackenzie
