= Kenneth Mackenzie, 3rd Earl of Seaforth =

Scottish nobleman and Highland clan chief (1635–1678)

Kenneth Mackenzie
- The Earl of Seaforth
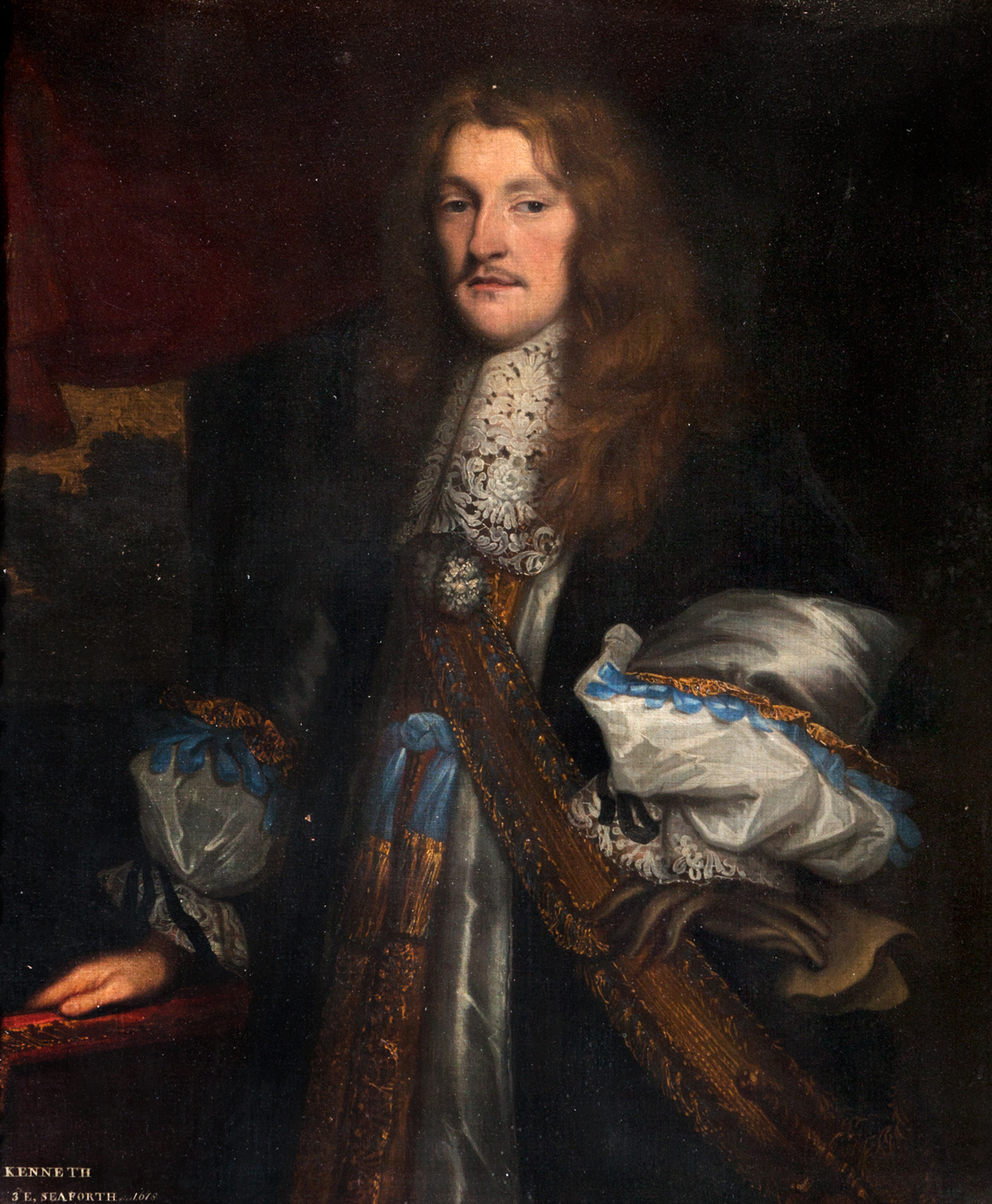
- Kenneth Mackenzie, 3rd Earl of Seaforth
- Chief of Clan Mackenzie: 1651–1678
- Predecessor: George Mackenzie
- Successor: Kenneth Mackenzie
- Born: 1635; Brahan Castle, Ross-shire, Kingdom of Scotland
- Died: 1678 (aged 43)
- Noble family: Clan Mackenzie
- Spouse: Isobel Mackenzie
- Father: George Mackenzie
- Mother: Barbara Forbes

Kenneth Mackenzie, 3rd Earl of Seaforth (1635 – December 1678) was a Highland clan chief and Scottish nobleman, who adhered faithfully to Charles II through his tribulations. From his great stature he was known among the Highlanders as "Coinneach Mor" (Great Kenneth).

== Origins and education ==
Mackenzie was the eldest son of George Mackenzie, 2nd Earl of Seaforth (died 1651) and Barbara, daughter of Arthur, Lord Forbes. The Mackenzies were a clan from Ross-shire that had risen to prominence in the 15th century during the disintegration of the Lordship of the Isles.

He was born at Brahan Castle in 1635, and when he was five or six years old his father placed him under the care of the Rev. Farquhar Macrae, minister of Kintail, and constable of Eilean Donan, who had a seminary in his house which was attended by the sons of the neighbouring gentry. From there, he went to public school and was sent in 1651 to King's College, Aberdeen, under the discipline of Mr Patrick Sandylands.

== Attempt to raise the clan ==
However, he had not been there long when the King arrived in Stirling and began to recruit an army for his proposed invasion of England. Kenneth's father remained in Holland, so he went home himself to raise his men for the King's service. He went straight to Kintail with leading members of his clan (his uncles, the Lairds of Pluscarden and Lochslinn; young Tarbat, Rory of Davochmaluag, Kenneth of Coul, Hector of Fairburn, and several others), but the Kintail men declined to rise with him, because he was but a child, asserting that they would not move without his father, their master, since the King, if he had use for him and for his followers, might easily bring him home.

== Adherent to Charles II ==
Immediately after the Battle of Worcester, at which Charles was defeated by Cromwell in 1651 - where we find among those present Thomas Mackenzie of Pluscarden as one of the Colonels of foot for Inverness and Ross, and Alexander Cam Mackenzie, fourth son of Alexander, fifth of Gairloch - Charles fled to the Continent, and, after many severe hardships and narrow escapes, he found refuge in Flanders, where he continued to reside, often in great want and distress, until the Restoration in May, 1660.

The Earl of Cromartie says that subsequent to the treaty agreed upon between Middleton and Leslie at Strathbogie, "Seaforth joined the King at Stirling. After the fatal battle of Worcester he continued a close prisoner until the Restoration of Charles." He was excepted from Oliver Cromwell's Ordnance of Pardon and Grace to Scotland in 1654, and his estates were forfeited, without any provision being allowed out of it for his wife and family. He supported the King's cause as long as there was an opportunity of fighting for it in the field, and when forced to submit to the opposing forces of Cromwell and the Commonwealth he was committed to prison, where, with "much firmness of mind and nobility of soul," he endured a tedious captivity for many years. Referring to the position of affairs at this period, the Laird of Applecross said that the "rebels, possessing the authority, oppressed all the loyal subjects, and him with the first; his estate was over-burthened to its destruction, but nothing could deter him so as to bring him to forsake his King or his duty".

When Charles II was recalled in 1660, he ordered his old and faithful friend Seaforth to be released, after which he became a great favourite at the licentious and profligate Court. On 23 April 1662 he received a Commission of the Sheriffship of Ross-shire, which was afterwards renewed to him and to his eldest son, jointly, on 31 July 1675; and when he had set his affairs in order at Brahan, he re-visited Paris, leaving his wife in charge of his interests in the North.

== Family and posterity ==
Kenneth married in about 1660 Isobel, daughter of Sir John Mackenzie of Tarbat, father of George Mackenzie, 1st Earl of Cromartie. They had four sons and four daughters, including his heir, Kenneth Mackenzie, 4th Earl of Seaforth, who succeeded him on his death in December 1678.

== Line of Chiefs ==
Preceded by Colin Mackenzie	Chief of Clan Mackenzie; 1651–1678	Succeeded by Kenneth Mackenzie

Peerage of Scotland
Preceded by George Mackenzie	Earl of Seaforth; 1651–1678	Succeeded by Kenneth Mackenzie
