= Bearasaigh =

Islet in outer Loch Ròg, Lewis, Scotland

Bearasaigh (Gaelic)

Location
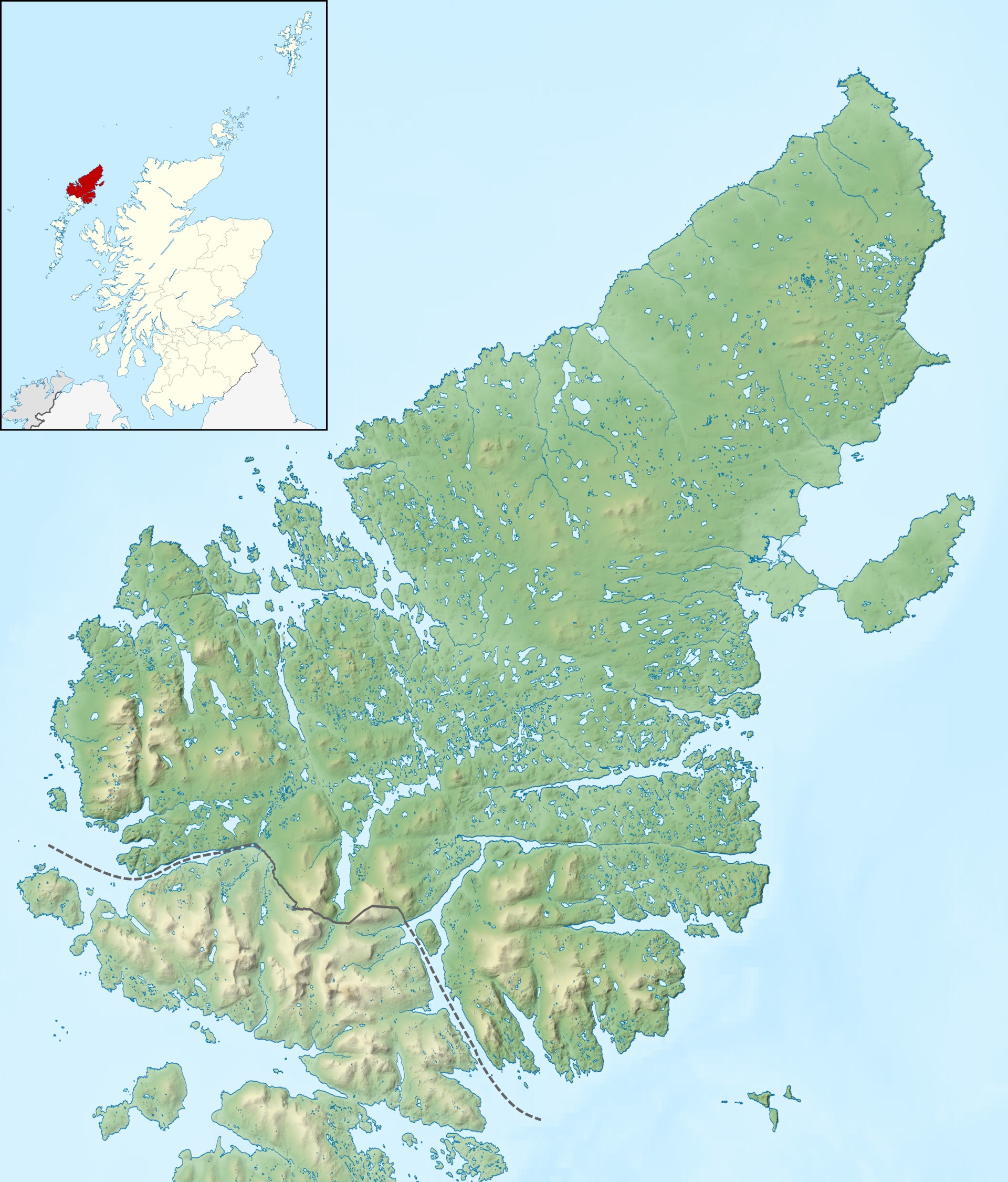
- Bearasaigh shown next to Lewis Bearasaigh shown within the Outer Hebrides
- OS grid reference: NB121425
- Coordinates: 58.27°N 6.91°W

Name
- Gaelic pronunciation: [ˈpɛɾəs̪aj]
- Name meaning: precipice isle
- Old Norse name: bergs-ey

Physical geography
- Island group: Outer Hebrides
- Area: <10 ha
- Highest elevation: 58 metres (190 ft)

Administration
- Council area: Comhairle nan Eilean Siar
- Country: Scotland
- Sovereign state: United Kingdom

Bearasaigh or Bearasay (and sometimes Berisay) is an islet in outer Loch Ròg, Lewis, Scotland. During the late 16th and early 17th centuries it was used as a pirates' hideout and the remains of various buildings from that period still exist. In the modern era its cliffs are used for rock-climbing.

== Geography ==
Bearasaigh lies north west of Great Bernera, Little Bernera and Flodaigh (flat island) and south of Seanna Chnoc (old hill). Although steep-sided the isle has a relatively flat summit. Immediately to the west is Stac an Tùill and there is a sea cave to the north east. The deep sea channel between Bearasaigh and Seanna Chnoc is said to be "troublesome" when the wind opposes the tidal current.

== Pirate's redoubt ==
In the 16th century the island was the retreat of Neil MacLeod, the Lewis patriot and illegitimate son of the clan chief of the MacLeods of Lewis, Old Ruari. In 1598 King James VI had authorised some "Gentleman Adventurers" from Fife to civilise the "most barbarous Isle of Lewis" and take over the herring fisheries. Initially successful, the colonists were driven out by local forces commanded by Neil MacLeod, his brother Murdoch and his nephews Malcolm, William and Ruairi. The MacLeods, with a contingent of 40 men lived on Bearasaigh for three years, eluding the pro-monarchy MacKenzies.

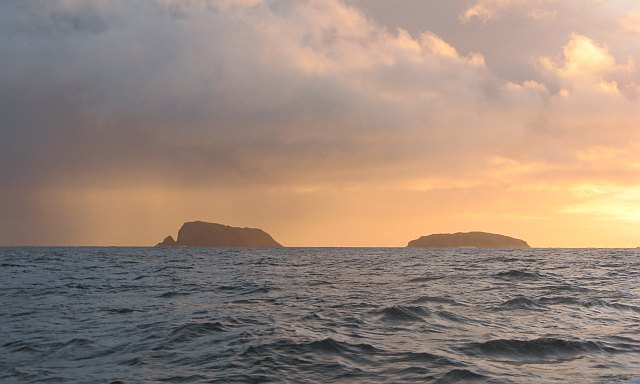
Seana Chnoc at left and Bearasaigh from the south west

During their stay there the Priam under the command of the English pirate Peter Love entered Loch Ròg. His ship was full of cargo which consisted of cinnamon, ginger, pepper, cochineal, sugar, 700 Indian hides, and 29 pieces of silver plate which had been looted from an English ship; a box, containing various precious stones of great value, which had been looted from a Dutch ship; as well as a large number of muskets. Love and MacLeod entered into an agreement and numerous ships were seized along with their cargoes. These included a ship owned by Thomas Fleming of Anstruther, whom they detained as a prisoner and a Flemish ship, later driven by bad weather onto the coast of Shetland, where the crew was forced to go ashore.

Neil MacLeod, however, betrayed Love, and during a feast attempted to seize the pirates. Some of the pirates were killed during a desperate scuffle, but Love and the Priam were captured by MacLeod and his men. This action provided MacLeod with both money and a means of reconciliation with the Scottish Government. Love and nine of his men were handed over to the authorities in December 1610. They were tried in Edinburgh and hanged on the sands of Leith.

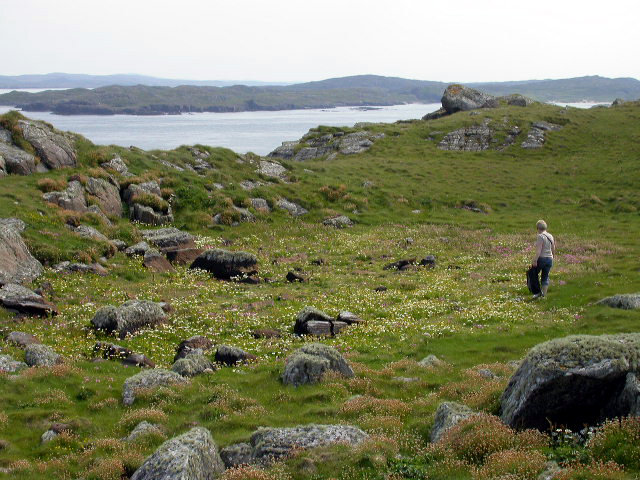
The flat top of Bearasaigh. The visible depression is believed to have been an artificial loch created by MacLeod's men to collect fresh water.

MacLeod did not last much longer than Love. In 1613, he was forced from Bearasaigh and fled to Harris and the protection of his kinsman, chief Rory Mor MacLeod of Harris and Dunvegan. Neil MacLeod hoped he could obtain a pardon from King James VI but upon reaching Glasgow, MacLeod of Harris and Dunvegan gave him up to the authorities. He was found guilty of high treason and hanged in April 1613 and his son Donald was banished to England.

== Ruins ==
The remains of the buildings used by Neil MacLeod and his 25 followers are in "the south-western corner of the island". There are five structures, one of which is T-shaped.

== Sporting activities ==
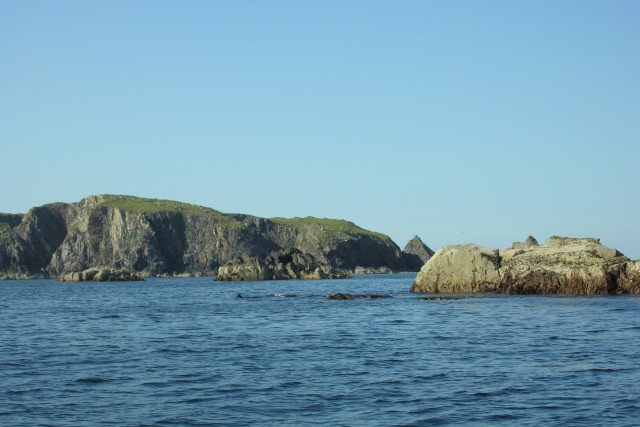
Bearasaigh's western cliffs, with Stac an Tuill at centre

Appropriately for a place the Norse called "precipice isle", rock climbers have identified a variety of routes on Bearasaigh's cliffs. "Hadrians Wall" is on the northwest corner of the island, "Pictland" at the north end and "Weathermans Geodha" on the eastern shore. There is also a climb called "Ask not for whom the Bell Tuills" on Stac an Tuill, a 50 metres (160 ft) sea stack that requires a swimmer to set up Tyrolean traverses.

Bearasaigh is also a destination for experienced sea kayakers.

== See also ==
- List of islands of Scotland
