= Prior of Urquhart =

The Prior of Urquhart was the head of the Benedictine monastic community of Urquhart Priory in Moray. The Priory of Urquhart was merged with the Priory of Pluscarden in 1454. The following is a list of priors and commendators: ___NOTOC___

== List of priors ==
- Richard, 1199 x 1200-1207 x 1208
- Thomas, 1226–1232
- William (I), 1237–1239
- John, 1248
- William (II) de Rathen, 1260/63-1295
- William (III) Butyrgak (Buttergask), 1343
- John Black, 1351 x
- Michael de Inverkeithing, 1358
- Robert, 1370
- Adam de Haddington, 1388–1391
- John Mason, 1388
- William de Busby, 1391
- John de Torry, 1388
- Thomas de Dunfermline, 1395
- William de Anderston, 1413
- Robert de Dolas, 1416–1418
- Gilbert Smert, 1416
- William de Dalketh, 1416–1418
- Andrew Rabuzy (Raeburn?), 1418-1430
- Richard Bothwell, 1418
- John Schaw, 1430
- William Broun, 1430–1445
- William Durward, 1433–1434
- John Tenalay (Benally), 1445–1454

== See also ==
- Abbot of Dunfermline
- Prior of Pluscarden
- Urquhart Priory
