= Kenneth Mackenzie, 1st Earl of Seaforth =

British peer, politician, soldier and Chief of the Highland Clan Mackenzie

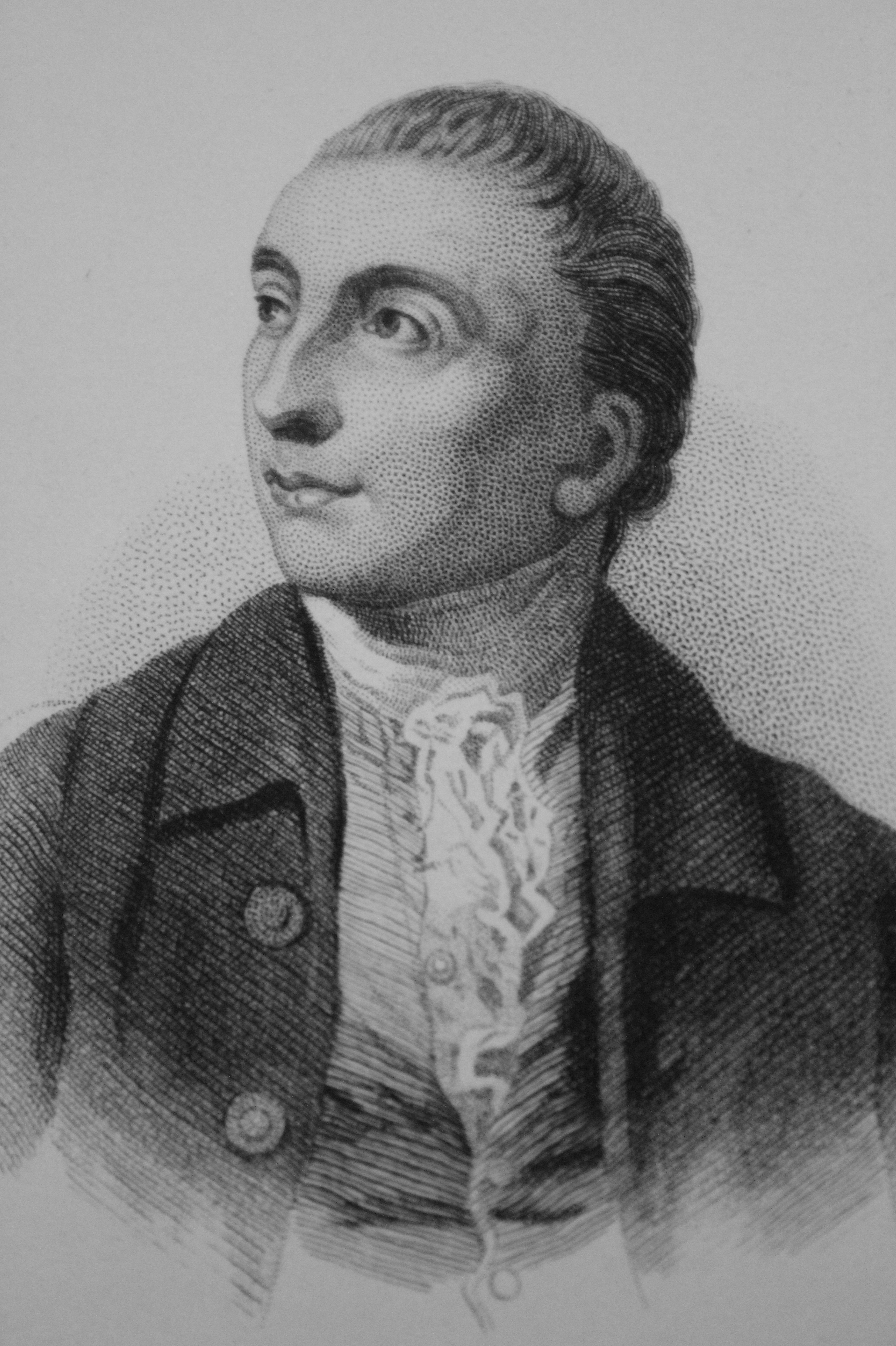
Kenneth Mackenzie, 1st Earl of Seaforth

Kenneth Mackenzie, 1st Earl of Seaforth FRS (15 January 1744 – 27 August 1781) was a British peer, politician, soldier and Chief of the Highland Clan Mackenzie.

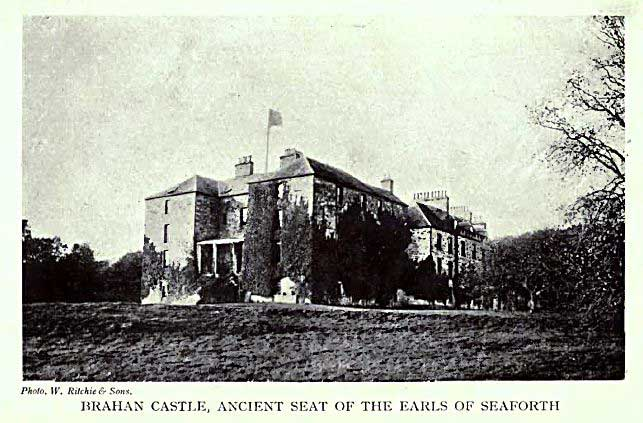
Brahan Castle – seat of the Earls of Seaforth

== Origins ==
Mackenzie was the son of Kenneth Mackenzie, Lord Fortrose (died 1761) by Mary, the eldest daughter of Alexander Stewart, 6th Earl of Galloway. His paternal grandfather was the attainted William Mackenzie, 5th Earl of Seaforth, whose estates he repurchased from the government. The Earls of Seaforth descended from the ancient family of Mackenzie of Kintail.

== Career ==
Mackenzie was created Viscount Fortrose and Baron Ardelve in the Peerage of Ireland on 18 November 1766. He was a Member of Parliament for Caithness from 1768 to 1774. On 3 December 1771, he was created Earl of Seaforth (a new peerage, also in the Peerage of Ireland).

On 12 November 1772, Mackenzie was elected a Fellow of the Royal Society.

As an act of gratitude for the favours he had received, Mackenzie raised a regiment, the 78th Seaforth (Highland) Regiment, serving as its Lieutenant Colonel Commandant from 29 December 1777. In June 1781 he sailed with the regiment when it embarked for India, but on 27 August 1781 he died on the journey and was buried at sea. He was succeeded as Lieutenant-Colonel Commandant by his cousin Thomas Frederick Mackenzie Humberston.

On his death his Irish earldom became extinct. He was succeeded as Chief of the Clan Mackenzie by his cousin Thomas Frederick Mackenzie Humberston.

== Family ==
Mackenzie married first Lady Caroline Stanhope (1747–1767), daughter of William Stanhope, 2nd Earl of Harrington by whom he had one daughter, Lady Caroline Mackenzie (1766–1847), who married Louis Drummond, Comte de Melfort (d. 1833) and had children. Lady Caroline died in 1846, and was interred in St. Giles' burial ground, now part of the grounds of St Pancras Old Church, London.

He married secondly Harriet Powell, or Lamb (died 11 December 1779), the daughter of an apothecary. Sir James Balfour Paul describes her tactfully as "a fashionable beauty of the town", but Horace Bleackley is rather more explicit:

The graceful Harriet Powell, equally frail and famous, whose winsome face was portrayed in many a mezzotint, had spent her early youth as an inmate of Mrs Hayes's disreputable establishment in King's Place, but now at last she had become faithful to one man, and was keeping house with Lord Seaforth, the creator of a famous regiment.

== Reputation ==
Seaforth's biographer has summarised him as:

...a dandy, musician and connoisseur, an adventurer and lady's man, Chief of his Clan, and founding Colonel of his own regiment. A child of the Enlightenment, he delighted in its achievements and greater freedoms – and took full advantage of both. But he was born with too great a sense of entitlement and too little sense of responsibility, and he never found any firm purpose in life.

In 1771, Mackenzie commissioned two paintings from Pietro Fabris depicting him at leisure in his villa in Naples, in the company of the British ambassador, Sir William Hamilton, the Mozarts, other musicians and a group of young gentlemen fencing.

Parliament of Great Britain
Vacant alternating constituency Title last held by John Scott (to 1761)	Member of Parliament for Caithness; 1768–1774	Vacant alternating constituency Title next held by John Sinclair (from 1780)
Military offices
New regiment	Lieutenant-Colonel Commandant of the 78th (Highland) Regiment of Foot; 1777–1781	Succeeded by Thomas Frederick Mackenzie Humberston
Peerage of Ireland
New creation	Earl of Seaforth; 1771–1781	Extinct
New creation	Viscount Fortrose; 1766–1781	Extinct
Preceded by Kenneth Mackenzie	Chief of Clan Mackenzie; 1761–1781	Succeeded by Thomas Frederick Mackenzie Humberston
