= George Sellar =

Recipient of the Victoria Cross

George Sellar VC
- Born: 1850; Keith, Banffshire
- Died: 1 November 1889 (aged 38-39); Lairg, Sutherland
- Burial place: Lairg Cemetery
- Military career
- Allegiance: United Kingdom
- Branch: British Army
- Rank: Sergeant
- Units: 72nd Regiment of Foot
- Conflicts: Second Anglo-Afghan War; 1882 Anglo-Egyptian War
- Awards: Victoria Cross

George Sellar VC (1850 – 1 November 1889) was a Scottish recipient of the Victoria Cross, the highest and most prestigious award for gallantry in the face of the enemy that can be awarded to British and Commonwealth forces. He died leaving a son born in 1887 named Edward Sellar, and twin daughters born in 1889, one of whom died in infancy.

== Details ==
Sellar was approximately 39 years old, and a lance corporal in the 72nd Regiment of Foot (later The Seaforth Highlanders – Ross-shire Buffs, Duke of Albany's), British Army during the Second Anglo-Afghan War when the following deed took place on 14 December 1879 at the Asmai Heights, near Kabul, Afghanistan for which he was awarded the VC:

For conspicuous gallantry displayed by him at the assault on the Asmai Heights, round Kabul, on the 14th December, 1879, in having in a marked manner led the attack, under a heavy fire, and, dashing on in front of the party up the slope, engaged in a desperate conflict with an Afghan who sprang out to meet him. In this encounter Lance-Corporal Sellar was severely wounded.

== Further information ==
He later achieved the rank of sergeant. He is buried at Lairg Cemetery, Sutherland, Scotland.

== The medal ==
His Victoria Cross is displayed at the Regimental Museum of The Queens Own Highlanders, Fort George, Highland, Scotland.
