= 72nd Regiment, Duke of Albany's Own Highlanders =

72nd Highland Regiment
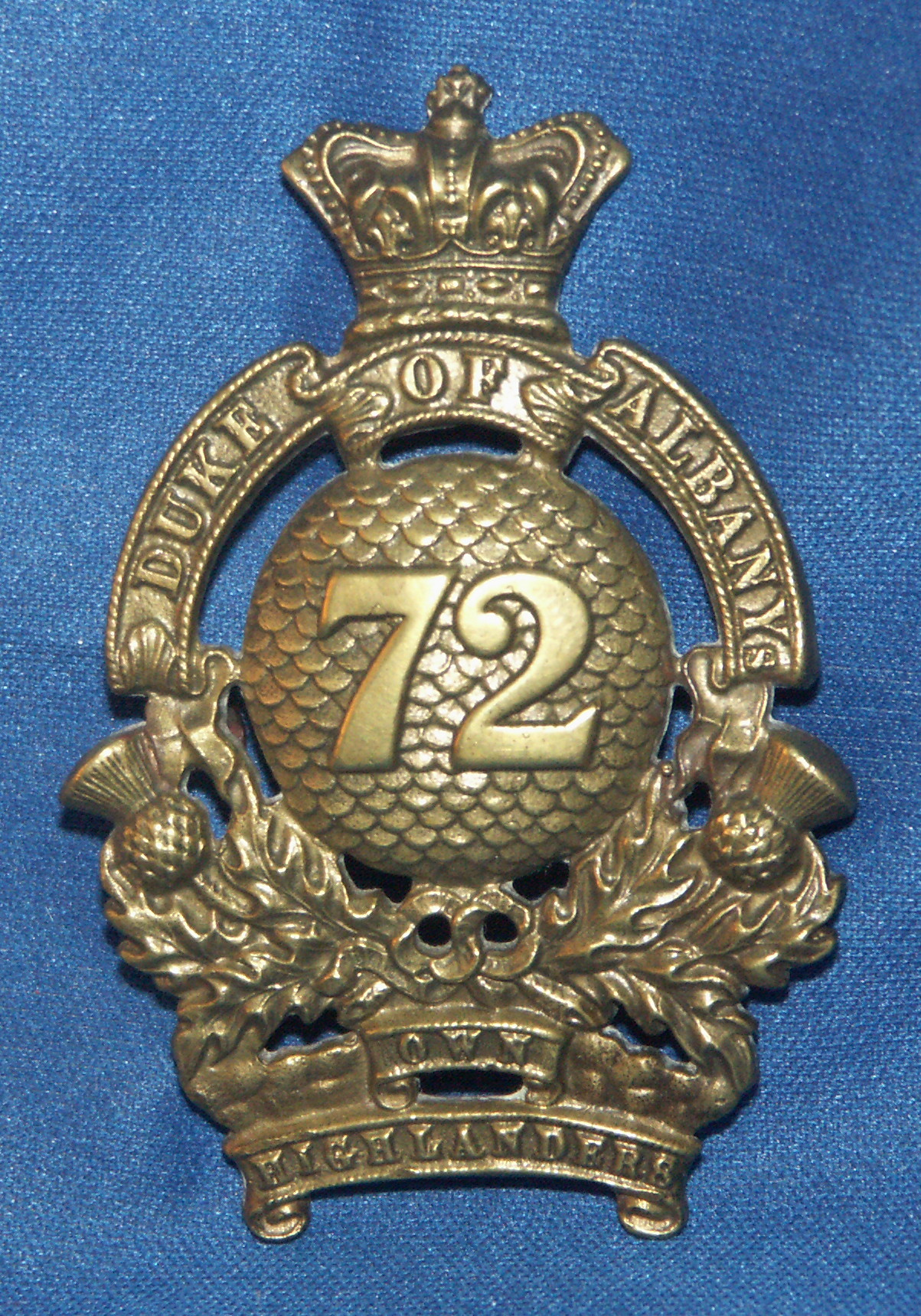
- Regimental cap badge
- Active: 1778–1881
- Country: Kingdom of Great Britain (1778–1800); United Kingdom (1801–1881)
- Branch: British Army
- Type: Infantry Regiment
- Size: One battalion (two battalions 1804–1816)
- Garrison/HQ: Stirling Castle (1873–81)
- Nickname: The Wild Macraes
- Engagements: Second Mysore War (1782–84); Third Mysore War (1789–92); Siege of Pondicherry (1793); Cape of Good Hope (1806); Isle de France (1810); South Africa (1835); Crimean War (1855–56); Indian Rebellion (1858); Second Afghan War (1878–80)

Insignia
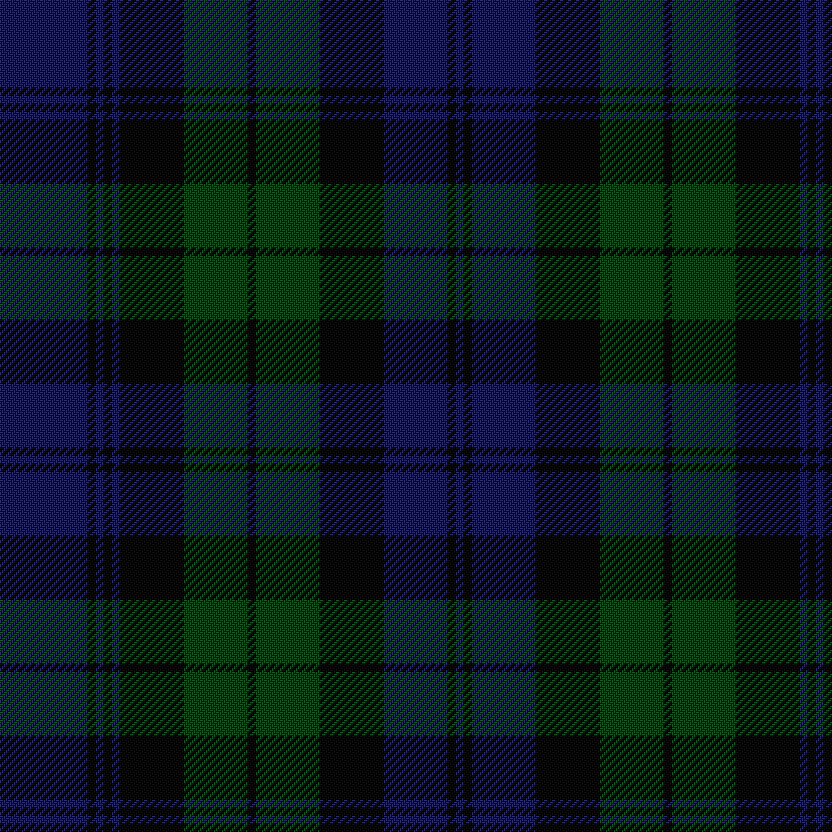
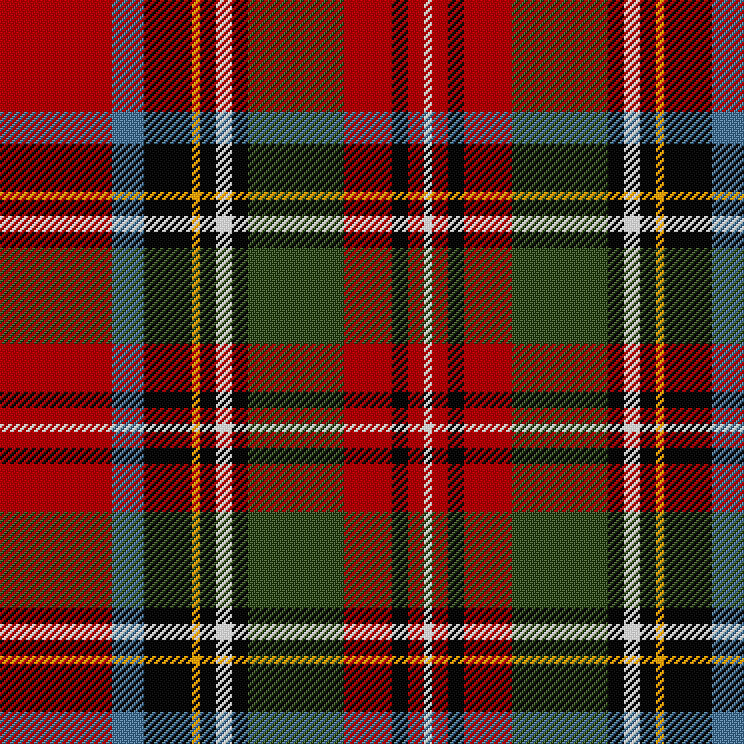
- Tartan: Left: Government sett kilt (1778–1809); Right: Prince Charles Edward Stuart trews (1823–81)

The 72nd Highlanders was a British Army Highland Infantry Regiment of the Line. Raised in 1778, it was originally numbered 78th, before being redesignated the 72nd in 1786. Under the Childers Reforms it amalgamated with the 78th (Highlanders) Regiment to form the 1st Battalion of the Seaforth Highlanders in 1881.

== History ==
=== Early history ===
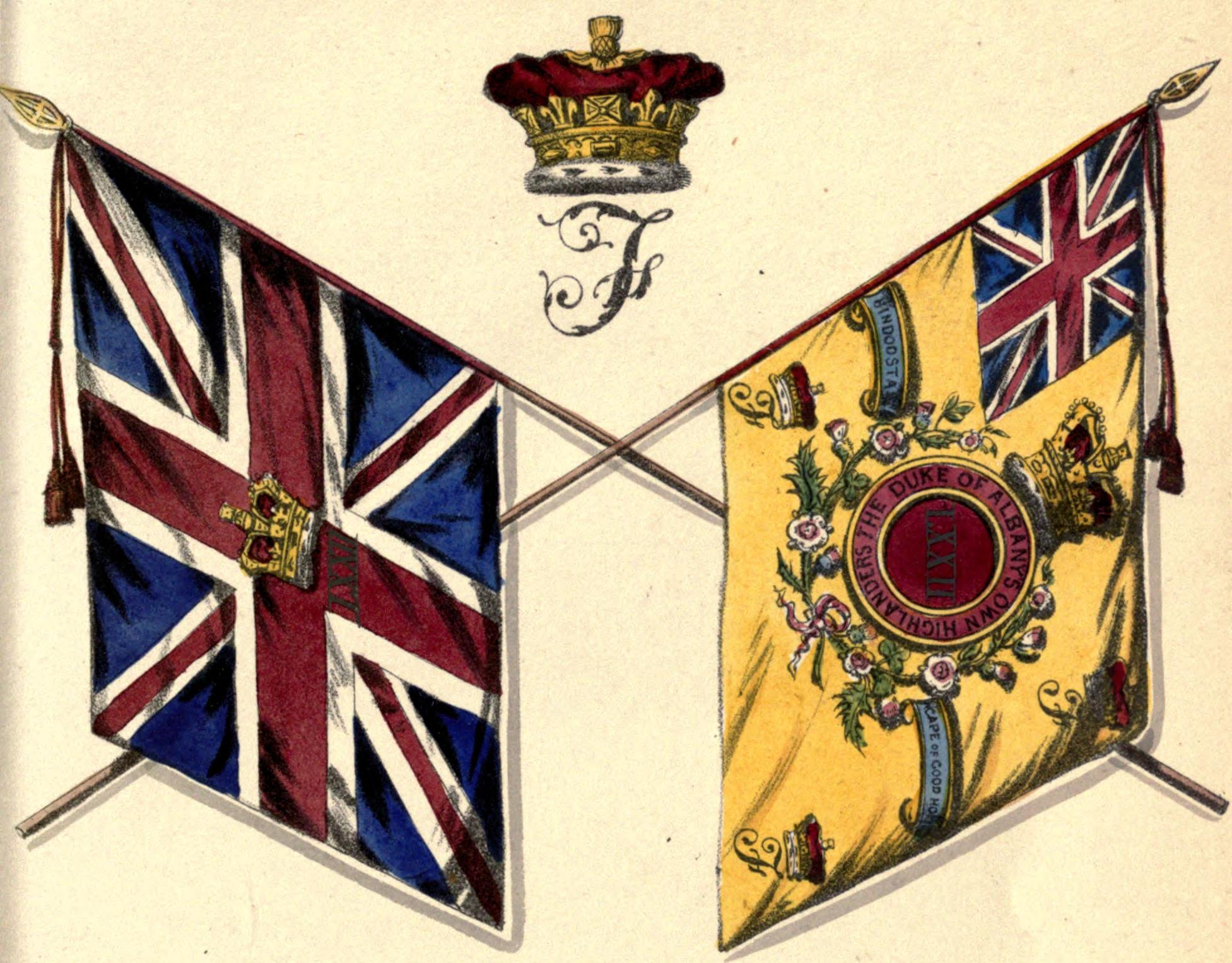
Regimental colours presented in 1825

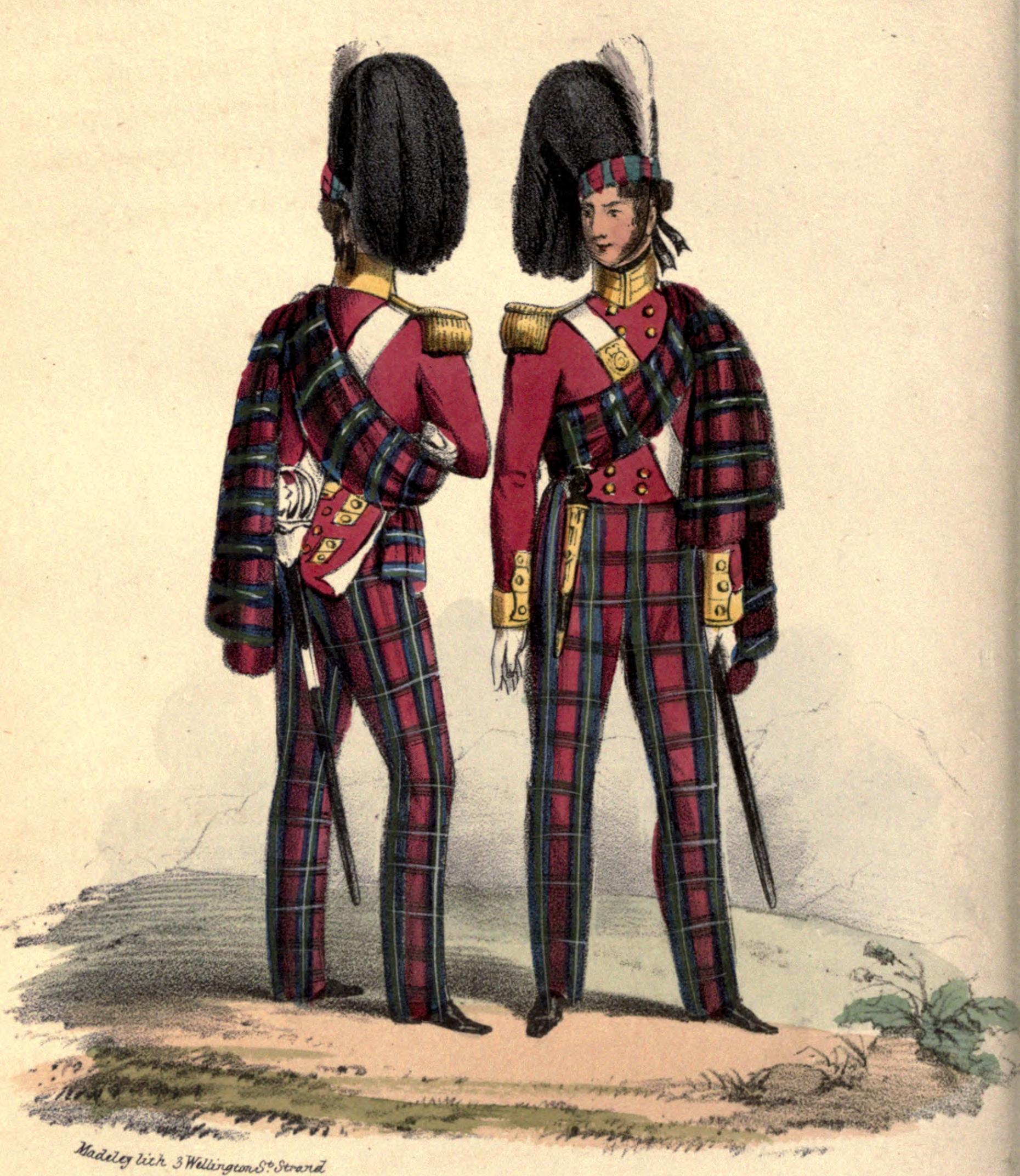
Officers' regimental uniform in the 1840s

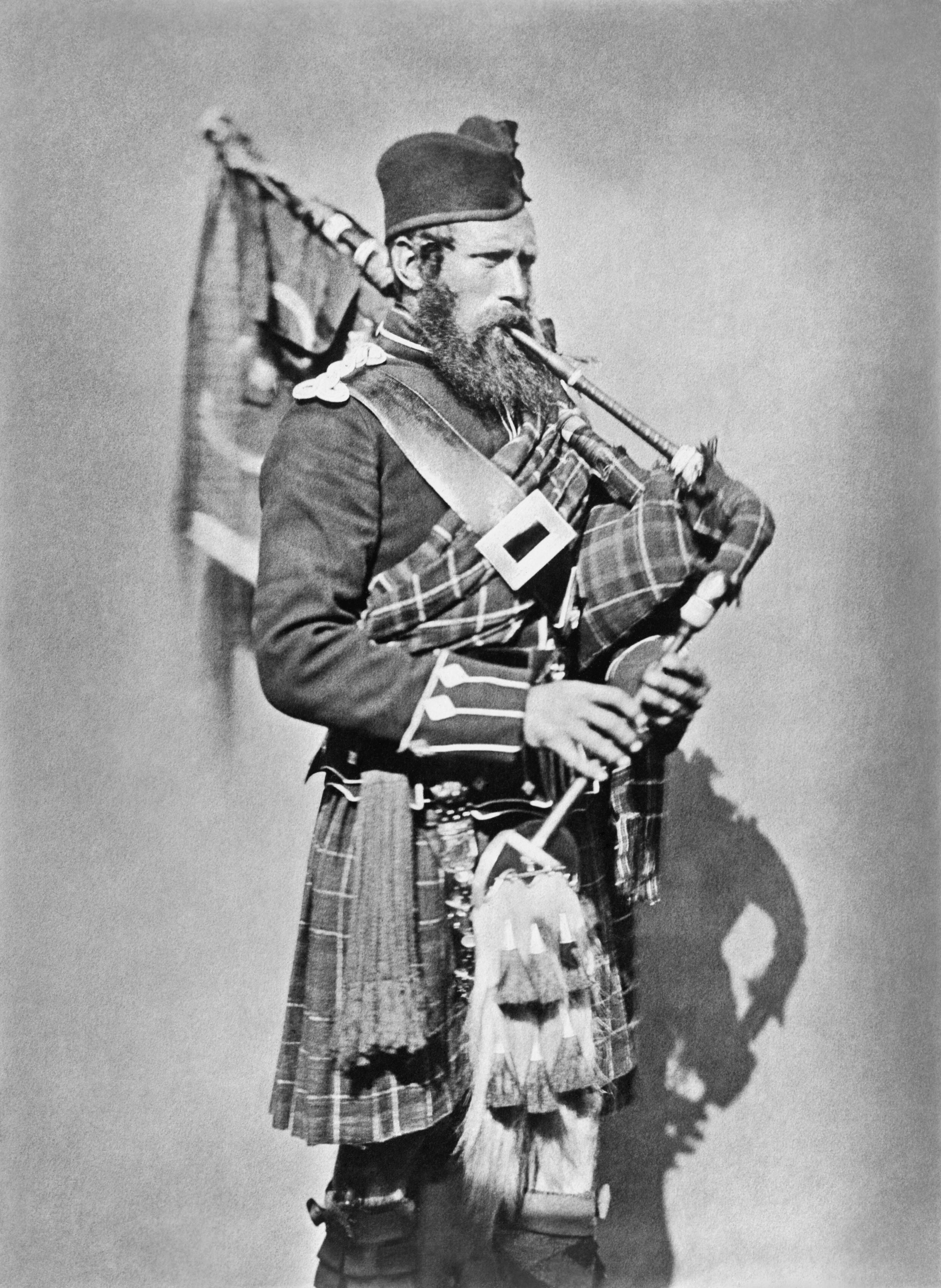
Pipe Major John Macdonald, who served in the Crimean War

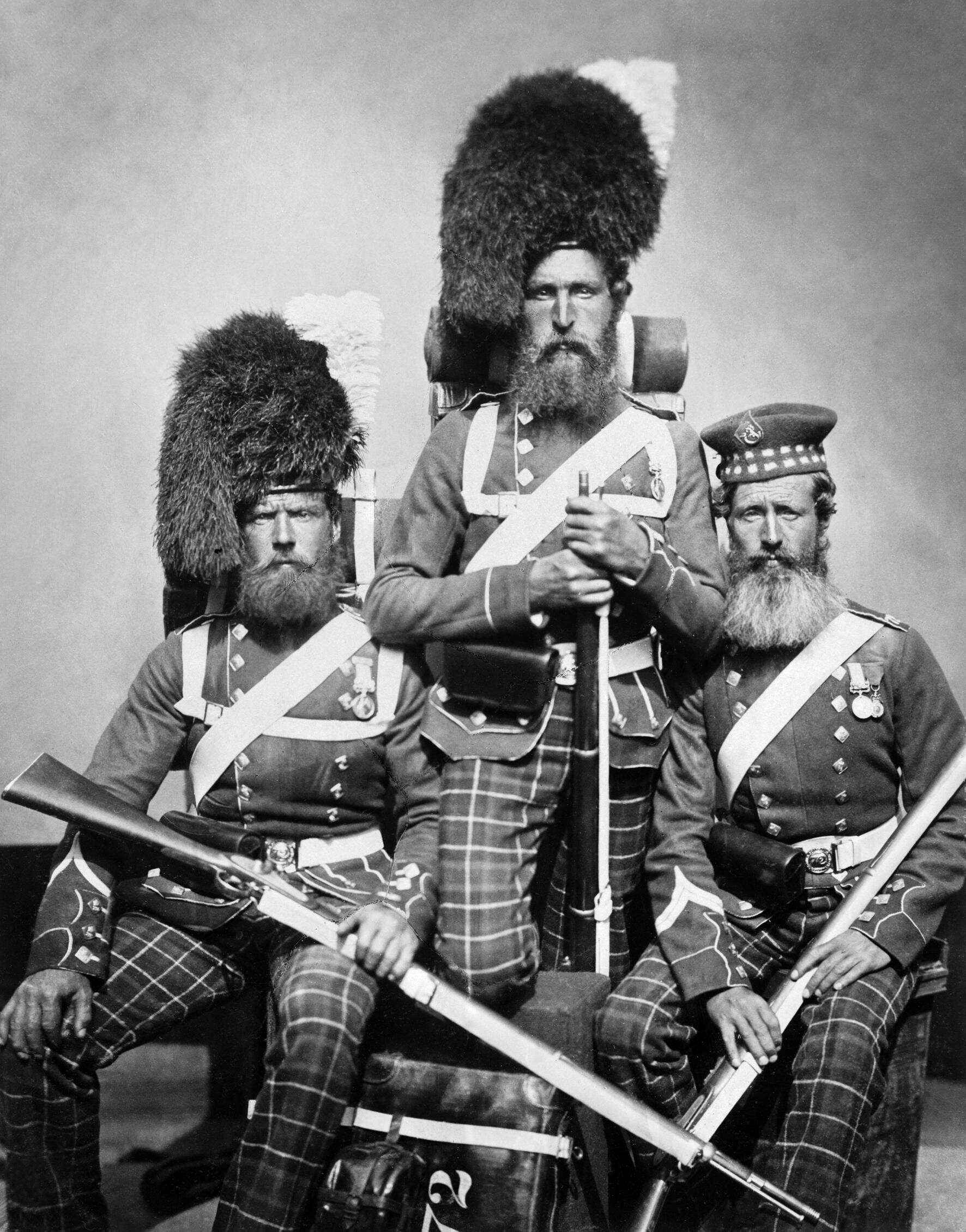
Troops of the 72nd Regiment in the Crimea, 1856

The regiment was raised in the Western Highlands by Kenneth Mackenzie, Earl of Seaforth as the Seaforth (Highland) Regiment in January 1778 as an act of gratitude for the restoration of the family Earldom which had been forfeited during the Jacobite rising of 1715. A corps of 1,130 men was raised of whom 900 were Highlanders and the remainder came from the Lowlands: it was established at Elgin, its first base, in May 1778.

In August 1778 the regiment marched to Leith to embark for India – but a dispute regarding their terms of service led about half the men to march back to Edinburgh where they took up a position of protest on Arthur's Seat, remaining there for several days. Here they were supplied with food by the people of the capital, who supported them in their grievances. The protest was reported in the London newspapers, including articles contributed by James Boswell. After three days of negotiations, a compromise was reached and the soldiers were pardoned. They were again marched to their quarters at Leith, led by the Earl of Seaforth, with the plan to send them to India now abandoned. (Note: Because of the large numbers of men from the clan Macrae being part of the force, this mutiny became known as "The affair of the Macraes.") At this time, the regiment was designated the 78th (Highland) Regiment of Foot, or Seaforth (Highland) Regiment. The regiment embarked for Jersey in September 1778, where in May 1779 they helped to repulse a French invasion. They moved to England in April 1781.

Posted to India, the regiment embarked from Portsmouth, with a strength of 973 rank and file, in June 1781. Because of change of diet, rough seas and scurvy, 274 died on the voyage; including the Earl of Seaforth, whose cousin Lieutenant Colonel Humberston Mackenzie took command of the regiment. On arrival at Madras on 2 April 1782, only 369 were fit to carry arms. They joined the army of Sir Eyre Coote at Chingleput at the beginning of May 1782 but because of their general health, they were considered unfit for service. Those able to wield arms were drafted into the 73rd (Macleod's Highlanders) Regiment. By October 1782 they had recovered their strength and "the colours were once again unfurled" to allow the regiment to take part in the wars against Tipu Sultan. Colonel Humberston Mackenzie was killed in April 1783 on board the sloop HMS Ranger in action against a Mahratta fleet on his return journey from Bombay to Madras during the Second Anglo-Mysore War. Major-General James Murray then succeeded to the colonelcy in November 1783.

The men had enlisted for a three-year period of service and 425 took their discharge in 1784 and returned to Scotland, the remainder electing to remain in India. They were joined by men from other regiments who had also opted to remain on the sub-continent, bolstering the regiment's numbers to 700 men. At the end of the war with the French, the number of Crown regiments was reduced and the regiment re-ranked as the 72nd (Highland) Regiment of Foot on 12 September 1786.

In December 1789 the Third Anglo-Mysore War started and the regiment saw action at the siege of Bangalore in February 1791and the siege of Savendroog in December 1791 as well as the siege of Seringapatam in February 1792 which marked the end of the War. Remaining in India, the regiment next saw action at the siege of Pondicherry in August 1793 during the French Revolutionary Wars. It then landed in Ceylon in spring 1794, helping to seize the island from the Dutch. The regiment returned home in February 1798, although many men were transferred to understrength units remaining in India. Back in Scotland, the regiment recruited 900 men from home-defence Fencible Regiments, a quarter of whom were English or Irish.

=== Napoleonic Wars ===
The 72nd moved to Ireland in 1801. A second battalion was raised in 1804 but it remained in the United Kingdom throughout the War, and was disbanded in 1816. In August 1805 the 1st battalion put to sea and landed in Madeira before moving on to the Cape of Good Hope at the end of the year and taking part in the Battle of Blaauwberg against the Dutch in January 1806. The regiment was renamed the 72nd Regiment of Foot and lost its highland uniform in April 1809, although it preserved many Scottish traditions, including unofficial retention of pipers. From South Africa, the 1st battalion sailed again and took part in the Invasion of Isle de France (Mauritius) in December 1810. It returned to Cape Town in June 1814 and, apart from a short posting in India in 1815, remained at the Cape until returning home in March 1822. In December 1823 the regiment was renamed the 72nd (or Duke of Albany's Own Highlanders) Regiment of Foot after Prince Frederick, Duke of York and Albany, again adopting Highland dress but with trews, with only pipers wearing the kilt.

=== The Victorian era ===
The regiment embarked for South Africa again in June 1828 and saw action in the Sixth Xhosa War in 1834–1835 before returning home in May 1840. In August 1842 it helped suppress the Preston Strike and was then sent to Gibraltar in November 1844 before sailing to Barbados in February 1848. The regiment went on to Halifax, Nova Scotia, in July 1851 and returned home in October 1854. The following year, the regiment moved first to Malta, then to serve in the Crimean War, arriving in May 1855, serving at the siege of Sevastopol as part of Colin Campbell's Highland Brigade. They returned home in 1856, and in August 1857 moved on to India to help suppress the Indian Rebellion, serving in the Central Indian campaign of 1858. It remained in India until 1866, when it returned home. It embarked for India again in 1871. The regiment played a prominent part in the Second Afghan War of 1878–80, seeing action at the Battle of Peiwar Kotal in November 1878, the Battle of Charasiah in October 1879 and the siege of the Sherpur Cantonment near Kabul in December 1879. They were then part of General Robert's column that marched from Kabul to Kandahar before taking part in the Battle of Kandahar in September 1880.

As part of the Cardwell Reforms of the 1870s, where single-battalion regiments were linked together to share a single depot and recruiting district in the United Kingdom, the 72nd was linked with the 91st (Argyllshire Highlanders) Regiment of Foot, and assigned to district no. 58 at Stirling Castle. On 1 July 1881 the Childers Reforms came into effect and the regiment amalgamated with the 78th (Highlanders) Regiment to form the 1st Battalion of the Seaforth Highlanders.

== Battle honours ==
Battle honours won by the regiment were:

- Carnatic (1782–96)
- Hindoostan (1782–96)
- Mysore (1782–96)
- Cape of Good Hope (1806)
- South Africa (1835)
- Sevastopol (1855)
- Central India (1855)
- Afghanistan 1878–80, Peiwar Kotal, Charasiah, Kabul, Kandahar (1878–80)

== Victoria Cross recipients ==
- Lieutenant Aylmer Spicer Cameron Indian Mutiny (30 March 1858)
- Lance-Corporal George Sellar Second Afghan War (14 December 1879)

== Colonels of the Regiment ==
Colonels of the Regiment were:

=== Lieutenant Colonels Commandant ===
Seaforth (Highland) Regiment

- 1777–1781: Col. Kenneth Mackenzie, 1st Earl of Seaforth (died at sea, 1781)

78th (Highland) Regiment of Foot, or Seaforth (Highland) Regiment – (1778)

- 1782–1783: Col. Thomas Frederick Mackenzie Humberston
- 1783–1786: Lt-Gen. James Murray

=== Colonels ===
72nd (Highland) Regiment of Foot – (1786)

- 1786–1794: Lt-Gen. James Murray
- 1794–1798: Lt-Gen. Sir Adam Williamson, KB
- 1798–1815: Gen. James Stuart

72nd Regiment of Foot – (1809)

- 1815–1817: Gen. Sir Rowland Hill, 1st Viscount Hill, GCB, GCH, KC
- 1817–1823: Gen. Sir George Murray, GCB, GCH

72nd (or Duke of Albany's Own Highlanders) Regiment of Foot – (1823)

- 1823–1836: Lt-Gen. Sir John Hope, GCH
- 1836–1847: Lt-Gen. Sir Colin Campbell, KCB
- 1847–1851: Lt-Gen. Sir Neil Douglas, KCB, KCH
- 1851–1870: Gen. Sir John Aitchison, GCB
- 1870: Gen. Charles George James Arbuthnot
- 1870–1881: Gen. Charles Gascoyne
- 1881: Gen. Sir Edward Selby Smyth, KCMG

== Sources ==
- Brander, Michael (1971). The Scottish Highlanders and their Regiments. Seeley, Service & Co, London. ISBN 0-85422-012-7.
- Cannon, Richard (1848). Historical record of the Seventy-Second Regiment, or the Duke of Albany's Own Highlanders: containing an account of the formation of the regiment in 1778, and of its subsequent services to 1848. Parker, Furnivall & Parker. OCLC 1083492049.
- Fairrie, Lieutenant Colonel Angus (1998). "Cuidich'n Righ": A History of the Queen's Own Highlanders (Seaforth and Camerons). Inverness: Regimental Headquarters, Queen's Own Highlanders. ISBN 0-9508986-0-0.
- MacLauchlan, Thomas (1885). The Scottish Highlands: Highland Clans and Highland Regiments. Vol. 7. Glasgow: A. Fullarton & Co. OCLC 720342.
- Sym, John M. (1962). Seaforth Highlanders. Gale & Polden, Aldershot. OCLC 1059816697.
