= Louis Pierre Francis Malcolm Drummond =

French soldier of Scottish descent

Louis Pierre Francis Malcolm Drummond (died 1833) was a French soldier of Scottish descent.

== Family ==
He was the son of Jeanne Elisabeth, daughter of Jean-François de La Porte, marquis de Presles, and her husband Louis Drummond de Melfort (died 1788), a grandson of John Drummond, 1st Earl of Melfort. He married firstly Lady Caroline Barry, daughter of Richard Barry, 6th Earl of Barrymore, and secondly Lady Caroline Mackenzie, daughter of Kenneth Mackenzie, 1st Earl of Seaforth. His son Louis Edward Genevieve (1791–1888) was also a soldier.
