= Pluscarden Abbey =

Benedictine monastery in Moray, Scotland

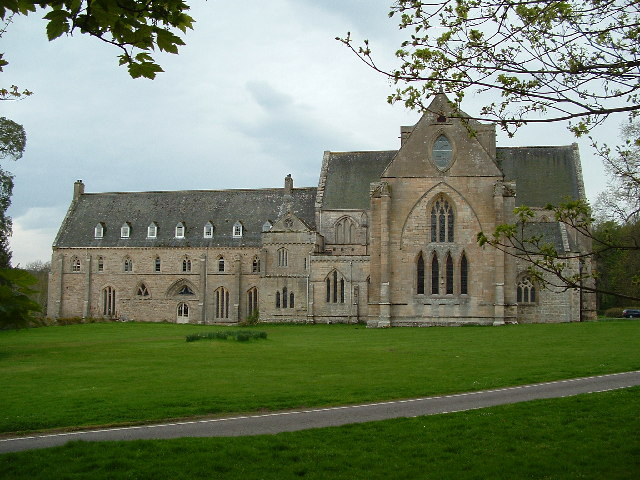
- View from the east
- Interactive map of Pluscarden Abbey

Monastery information
- Order: Benedictine, formerly Valliscaulian
- Established: c.1230
- Disestablished: 1587
- Reestablished: 1948
- Mother house: Prinknash Abbey (Prev. Val des Choux; Dunfermline Abbey)
- Dedication: Our Blessed Lady, Saint John the Baptist and Saint Andrew
- Diocese: Diocese of Aberdeen (present); Diocese of Moray (historical)

People
- Founder: Alexander II of Scotland
- Important associated figures: Lord Colum Crichton-Stuart

Site
- Country: Scotland
- Coordinates: 57°36′01″N 03°26′18″W
- Visible remains: Eastern part of church and east range of cloister, restored

Inventory of Gardens and Designed Landscapes in Scotland
- Official name: Pluscarden Abbey (Priory)
- Designated: 20 June 1987
- Reference no.: GDL00316

Pluscarden Abbey (/ˈplʌskərdən/) is a Catholic Benedictine monastery in the glen of the Black Burn, six miles (ten kilometres) southwest of Elgin, Moray, Scotland. It was founded in 1230 by Alexander II for the Valliscaulian Order.

In 1454, following a merger with the priory of Urquhart, Pluscarden Priory became a Benedictine house. The Scottish Reformation saw the decline of the priory, and by 1680 it was in a ruinous condition. Some work to arrest decay took place in the late 19th century. In 1948, the priory became a house of the Subiaco Cassinese Congregation of Benedictines, and restoration began at the hands of monks from Prinknash Abbey in Gloucestershire. In 1966, the priory received its independence from the mother-house; it was elevated to abbatial status in 1974.

== History ==
=== Etymology ===
The name Pluscarden, of which the earliest attestations were Pluscardyn in 1226 and Ploschardin 1233, is "problematic" in its origin. Pluscarden regularly appears in discussions of the possible Pictish or Brittonic element *carden, perhaps meaning "an enclosure", which may be the second element. The first element seems to be Brittonic, but its identity is less apparent. It may be equivalent to the Cornish plos, apparently "filthy". The most phonetically plausible solution is that the first element is either Gaelic plaosg, "integument, nutshell, eggshell" or its Pictish cognate *plusc (cf. Welsh plisc, Middle Breton plusk). A word related to Welsh plas, "a place", has been suggested but is unlikely given the word is loaned from Old French.

From the suggestion that plaosc or *plusc is the first element arises the possibility that the second part of the name is derived from Gaelic árd, or the Pictish equivalent of Welsh ardd, both meaning "height" (cf. Arden, Warwickshire, England).

=== Valliscaulian priory ===
The Valliscaulian priory of Pluscarden was founded by King Alexander II. The now-defunct Valliscaulian Order was small compared to the great medieval religious houses and emerged at a time when austere monasticism had spread across Europe c. 1075–1200. The founder of the Order was Viard who trained as a lay cleric at the Charterhouse of Lugny, Leuglay.

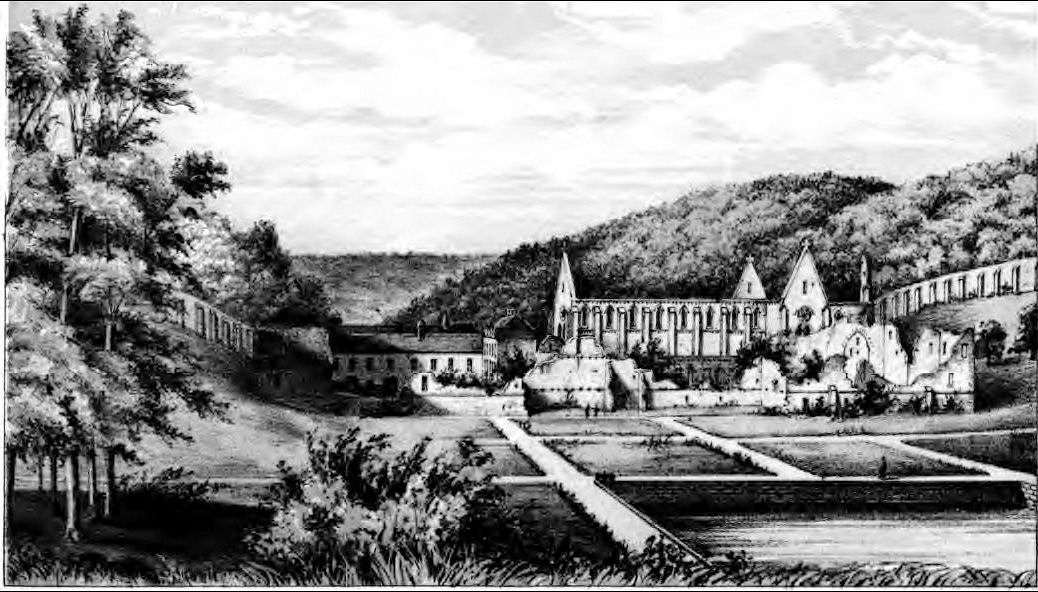
The founding Priory of Val des Choux

The founding priory was Val des Choux around 20 km from Châtillon-sur-Seine in Burgundy. Viard, who drew up the ascetic rules governing the Order, received consent from Pope Innocent III in 1205–6; a copy of this bull was preserved in the Chartulary of Moray. The consequential legal charter, the Ordinale, provided the exact details of the liturgy, the obligations of office bearers and the conduct of the Order. The Ordinale contains rules that show close resemblances to Cistercian and, to a lesser degree, Carthusian practices. The most obvious difference in approach from the Cistercian practices would have been the separate cells for the monks – most likely a partitioned dormitory as practised by the Grandmontines – and the vegetable plots where the brothers were allowed to tend their private gardens in the afternoons when not engaged in official priory duties. Another Carthusian rule adopted by the Valliscaulians was that the priory should have no more than 20 monks. This meant that with the small size of the community, survival would be difficult without wealthy patrons. The Valliscaulians only had 21 houses in total, according to JAP Mignard, the Order's 19th-century historian and three of these were in Scotland, namely Pluscarden, Beauly in Ross-shire and Ardchattan in Argyll. Although Valliscaulians were closer to the Cistercians, the main outward aspects of the Order caused Walter Bower, Abbot of Inchcolm, to have taken the three Valliscaulian houses for that of the Carthusians. He recorded this in his Scotichronicon of 1437 and so must have been aware of their customs so soon after the establishment of the only Scottish Carthusian monastery in Perth in 1429.

Official Seal of Pluscarden Priory – Sigillum Conventus Vall[is Sancti] Andree in Moravia

Alexander II granted the Order extensive lowland estates between the rivers Ness and Spey. He also gave the priory the earnings of mills in Pluscarden, Elgin, Dunkinedir, Molen, Forres and Dulpoten and salmon fishing rights in both the Findhorn and Spey. The priory was also granted a tithe on all the iron mined in the forests of Pluscarden. All of these taken together meant that Pluscarden prospered.

Contemporary chronicles from the priory do not exist however the Liber Pluscardensis is a history of Scotland which borrows heavily from the writings in the Scotichronicon and Fordun and was penned in Pluscarden in 1461 at the behest of the Abbot of Dunfermline. The document was written by a secular cleric called Maurice Buchanan but he gives no information originating from the priory's monastic establishment.

It has traditionally been held that there were two 14th-century fires at the priory. The first was ascribed to Edward I of England in 1303 and the second, in 1390, to Alexander Stewart, 1st Earl of Buchan, and called the Wolf of Badenoch. Certainly, the physical evidence confirms that there was a significant fire and that the damage caused to the transepts was never restored points to dwindling resources. In 1398 Prior Thomas Fullonis resigned having served for 21 years. He wrote to the Bishop of Moray informing him of the hard times at the priory but that Prior Alexander (1398 – c.1417) had been elected and had been tasked with repairing the deteriorating church and living areas.

The state of the house, both physically and politically, had by the 15th century, become serious with regular arguments breaking out over who should be prior. Falling income and disjointed contact with France due to the Hundred Year War (1337–1453) exacerbated the situation. The Scottish houses were given an exemption from attending the yearly General Chapter at Val de Choux.

=== Benedictine priory ===
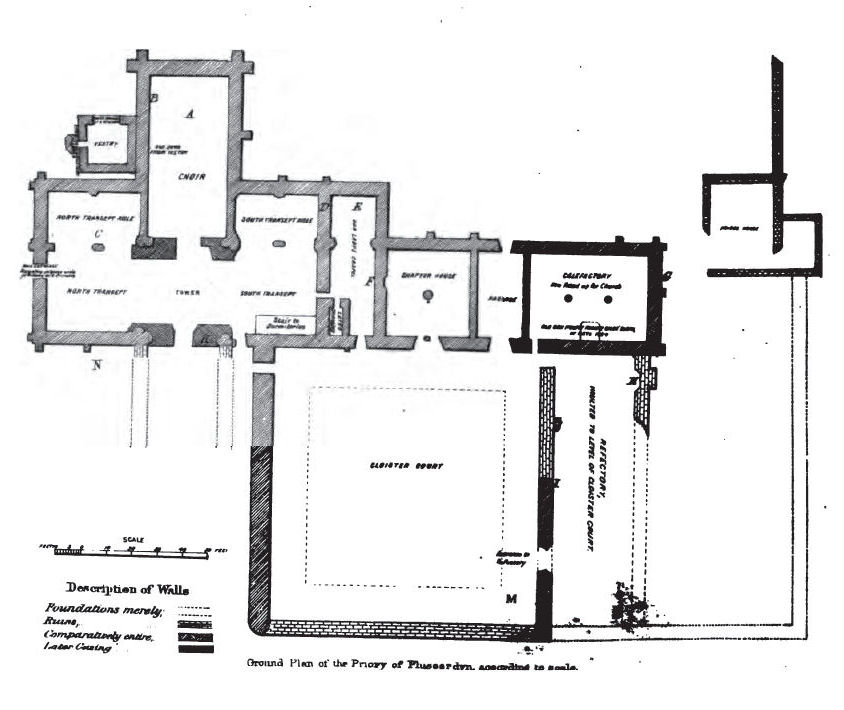
Plan of Pluscarden Abbey

In 1453, John Bonally, the Prior of Urquhart formally requested from the Pope that his monastery and Pluscarden be merged. At that time, Urquhart had only two monks and Pluscarden had six. A Papal Bull was issued by Nicholas V on 12 March 1453 joining the priories and from then on Pluscarden became a daughter house of the Benedictine Dunfermline Abbey. Pluscarden was chosen over Urquhart for the priory location as the buildings were more spacious and thought easier to restore and Bonally was appointed as its first Benedictine prior. However, the Abbot of Dunfermline's representative informed him that he found the priory in need of much renovation; the consequence of nearly 60 years of neglect was that vaulted roofs of the choir and crossing were in danger of collapsing. About the time of John Bonally irregularities had become commonplace in the Priory of Pluscarden as well as before that at Urquhart and the priors of both places were accused of much sinfulness. Following a commission held into the alleged abuses, Bonally resigned and was succeeded by William Boyce who was the sacrist at Dunfermline Abbey. William Boyce, the second Benedictine Prior of Pluscarden, was given responsibility for the maintenance of the church fabric of Dunfermline Abbey from Abbot Richard de Bothwell (1445–70) at the time that the west end of the abbey's nave was restored. The inference has been made that it was during this prior's tenure that some major improvements were carried out at Pluscarden. Indeed, by 1506, King James IV was able to stay at the priory and was noted as giving the masons working on the building a sum of 15 shillings for buying drink.

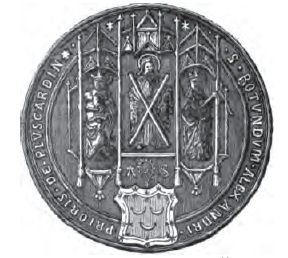
Seal of Alexander Seton as Prior of Pluscarden

The 16th-century complement at Pluscarden as shown by their signatures on charters shows that there were seven monks in 1500, nine in 1508, thirteen in 1524 and also in 1548, and eleven in 1558. After the Reformation, the rental of the priory in 1561 gives details of the inhabitants – five monks, a chamberlain with two servants, a master-cook, master-baker, porter and a gardener. George Learmonth (1509–29) and Alexander Dunbar (1529–60) were the last two priors before the Reformation who, although they were secular clerics, both wore the Benedictine habit. Dunbar, in a similar manner to his contemporary Bishop Patrick Hepburn at Elgin, carried out large-scale alienation of the priory property – in Dunbar's case, to his own family. Dunbar died in 1560 and the community was made the responsibility of a succession of lay commendatory priors who saw to the monastic revenues and the welfare of those monks that remained.

The Countess of Northumberland, a Catholic exiled from England at the Rising of the North, stayed at Pluscarden as a guest of Lord Seton in July 1570. The last monk recorded at Pluscarden was Thomas Ross who along with the commendatory prior, Alexander Seton (later to become the 1st Earl of Dunfermline), both witnessed a grant of fishings in 1586. After the priory ceased to have a monastic community, the estates were administered by lay priors.

=== Abandonment ===
During the 17th century, the priory became ruinous and was used as a quarry for the rebuilding of St Giles Kirk, in Elgin. The payments made to hauliers imply that the pulling down of the building must have been on a large scale. The lands at Pluscarden came into the ownership of the Earls of Fife and the 4th Earl arrested further deterioration when he converted the east range into a shooting lodge. The property was then bought by John Patrick Crichton-Stuart, 3rd Marquess of Bute in 1897 who commenced restoration of the church but was halted in 1900 upon his death.

=== Reestablishment ===
Lord Colum Crichton-Stuart who now owned the buildings at Pluscarden gave the priory and its land to the Benedictine Prinknash Abbey in 1943. The community arrived in 1948 and within seven years the church's bell tower had been roofed. Restoration work continued and in 1966 the priory obtained its independence from Prinknash, achieving abbey status in 1974.

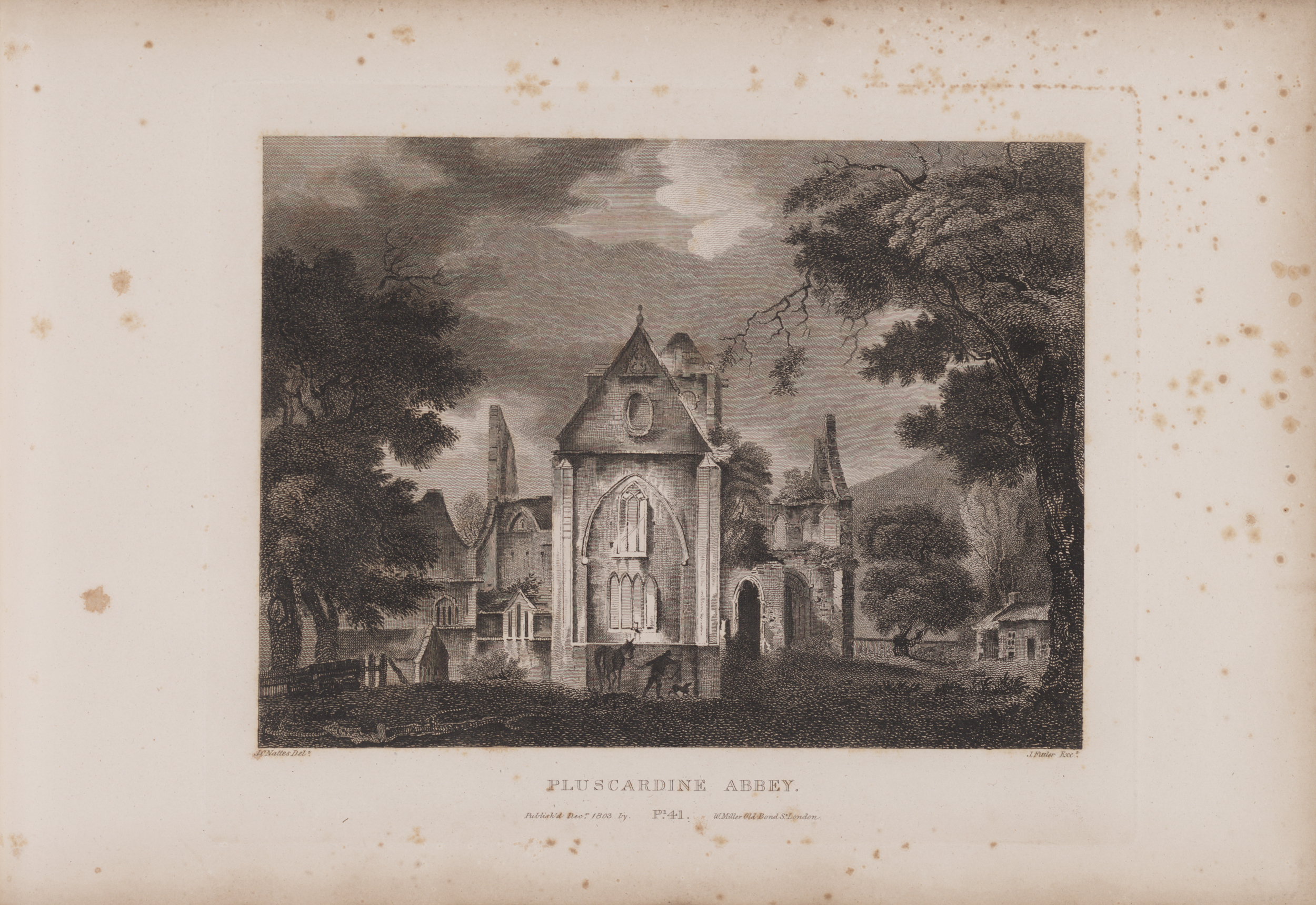
Engraving of the abbey by James Fittler in Scotia Depicta, published 1804

In 1987, Pluscarden accepted the request of St. Mary's Monastery, Petersham, US, to attain canonical status as a dependency of Pluscarden. In 1990, Dom Anselm Atkinson of Pluscarden was appointed Superior of St. Mary's by Abbot Alfred Spencer. He remained in this office at Petersham until elected Abbot of Pluscarden on 9 August 2011. His abbatial blessing took place at Pluscarden on 3 October 2011.

The abbey welcomes guests and occasionally conducts formal retreats. Silence is generally observed in the church, refectory and other monastic areas. Guests often help with the manual work of the abbey.

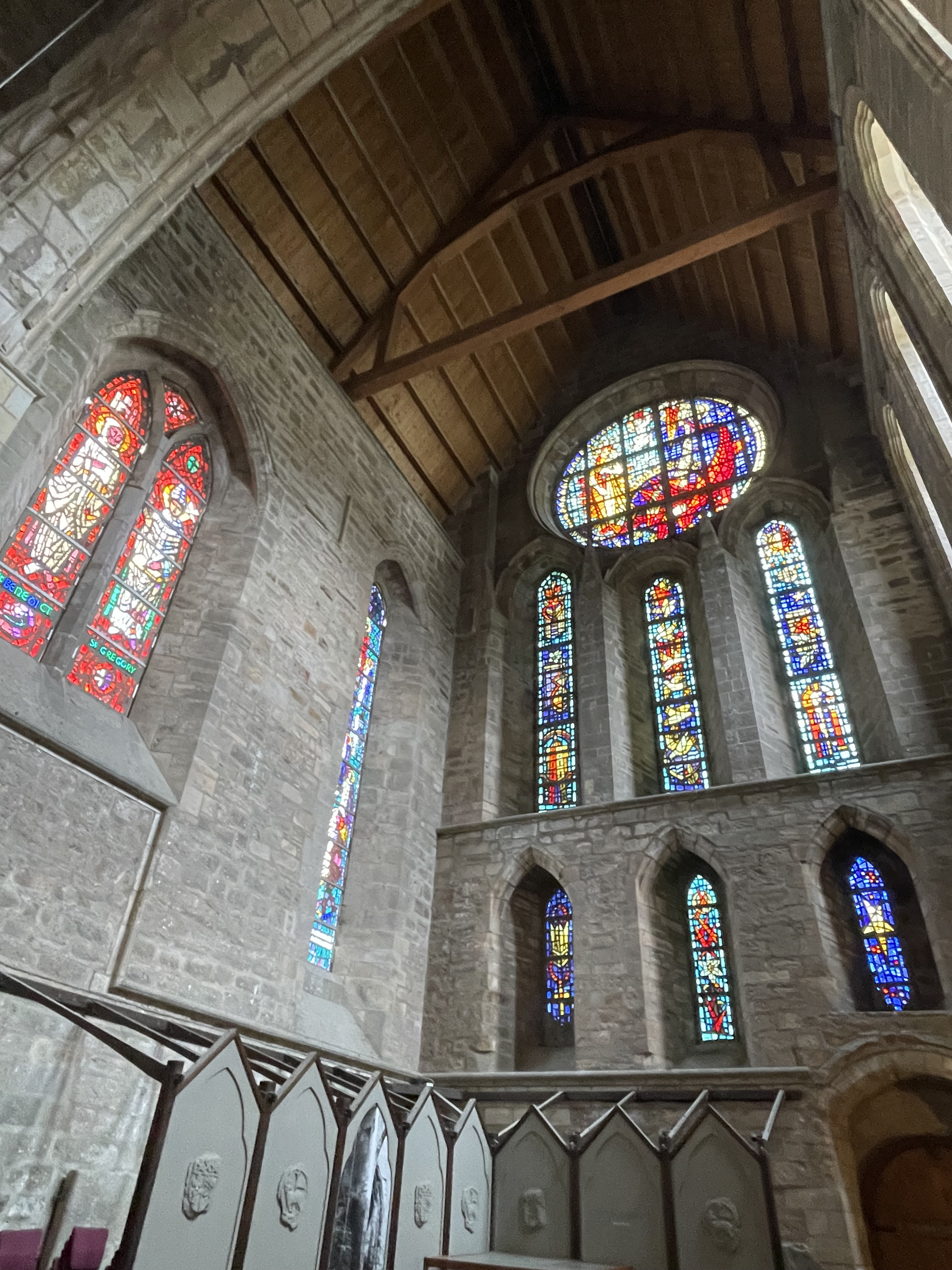
North transept

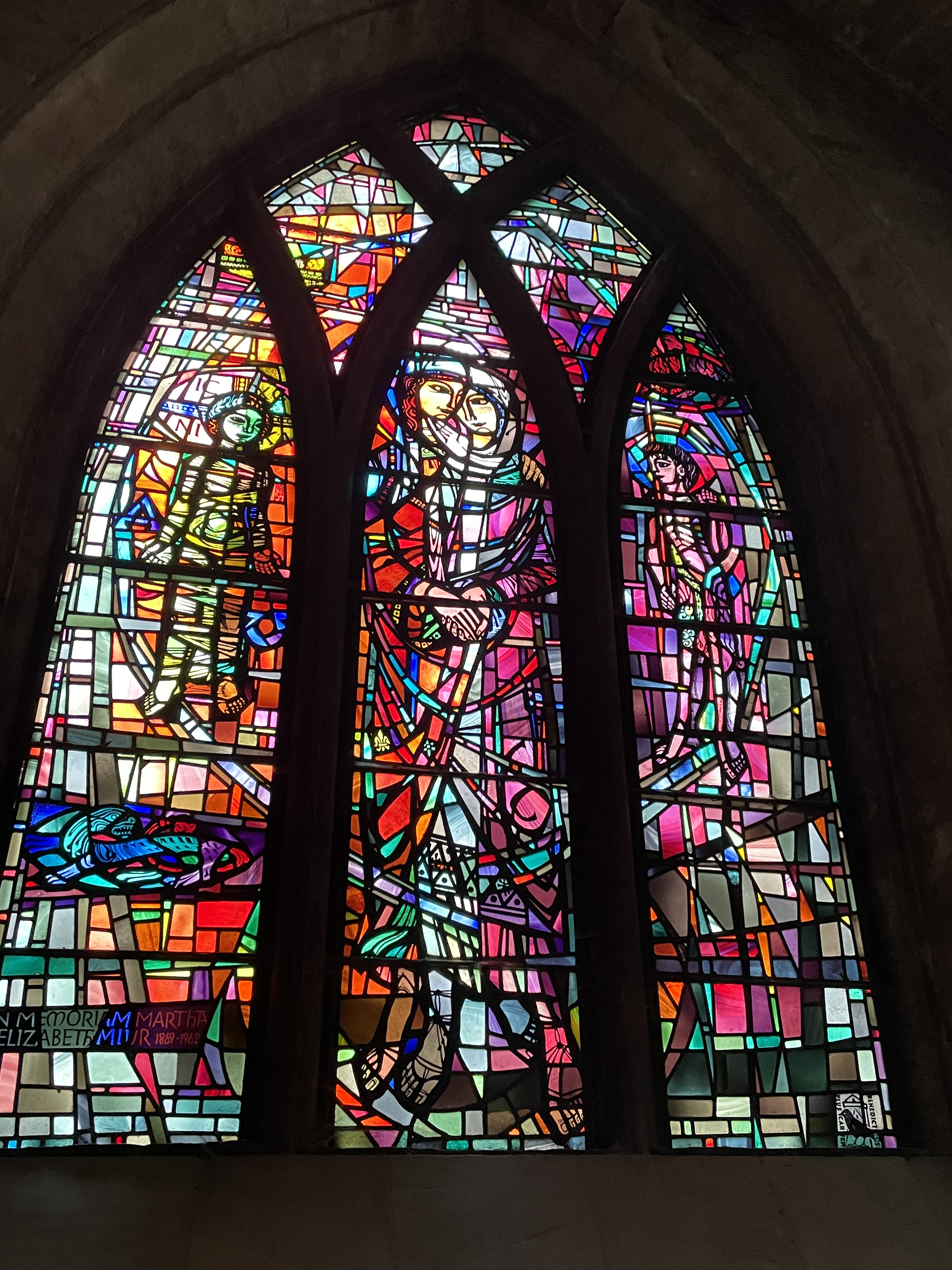
Stained glass in Pluscarden Abbey

== Priors and abbots of Pluscarden ==
TENURE	SUPERIOR	NOTES
VALLISCAULIAN PRIORY
1239 ? 1264	Simon; John Frer; John Suryass	Exact dates unknown
1264–1274	Andrew	Later Abbot of Kinloss
1274*	William	Bagimond's Tax Roll, Pluscarden assessed for £533 annual income.
1286*	Simon	
1345*	John Wise	
1367–1398	Thomas Fullonis	
1398*	Alexander de Pluscardyn	Brother of Henry de Pluscardyn, Chancellor at Elgin Cathedral
c.1417*	Eoghann MacPheadair	David Cran, monk of Deer intruded briefly as prior.
1428*	Andrew Symson	Monk of Deer
1435*	Richard Lundy	Monk of Melrose; did not take up office – the monks of Pluscarden elect William Birnie, a Pluscarden monk, but this was disputed by Symson and lawsuit continued until 1439
1447*	Willam Hagis	Monk of Pluscarden; election challenged by William Birnie.
1449–1454	Andrew Haag	Bull of Pope Nicholas V dated 1454 commanding the union of the priories of Urquhart and Pluscarden
FIRST BENEDICTINE PRIORY
1454*	John Bonally	Pluscarden and Urquhart priories merge by Papal Bull. John Bonally, monk of Dunfermline and Prior of Urquhart appointed Prior of Pluscarden.
1456–1476	William Boyce	Monk of Dunfermline
1476–1480	Thomas Foster	Monk of Dunfermline; Gavin Dunbar, cleric of Moray Diocese, later Bishop of Aberdeen, attempts to become prior in 1479.
1481–1486?	David Boyce	Monk of Dunfermline and elected by the community.
1487–1509	Robert Harrower	
1509–1529	George Learmonth	Secular cleric of St Andrews Diocese. Died March 1531.
1529–1560	Alexander Dunbar	Secular cleric of Ross Diocese. Died September 1560
COMMENDATORY PRIORY
1561*	Master William Cranston	1561–1562 George, 7th Lord Seton named Yconomus of Pluscarden.
1565–1577	Alexander Seton	Alexander Seton was the 4th son of the 7th Lord Seton and was the Prior of Pluscarden after being appointed by Queen Mary Stuart. In 1577, he was deprived of Pluscarden for failing to adhere to Protestantism.
1577–1582	James Douglas of Spott	Intruded as prior. Natural son of James Douglas, 4th Earl of Morton.
1587	Alexander Seton	Pluscarden was erected into a temporal lordship belonging to Seton. He became Lord Urquhart upon his appointment to the legal bench and later received the title of Lord Fyvie in 1597, and then Earl of Dunfermline in 1605. He became Chancellor of Scotland under King James VI.
LAY PRIORY
1595–1611	Kenneth Mackenzie of Kintail	
1611–1633	Colin Mackenzie 2nd Lord Kintail	
1633–1649	Thomas Mackenzie of Kintail	
1649–1655	Sir George Mackenzie of Tarbat	
1655–1662	Sir George Mackenzie	
1662–1664	George Sinclair, Earl of Caithness and Major George Bateman	Joint lay priors of Pluscarden
1664–1687	Major George Bateman	Sole lay prior of Pluscarden
1687–1709	James Grant of Grant	
1709–1763	William Duff of Dipple	Later 1st Earl of Fife
1763–1809	James, 2nd Earl of Fife	
1809–1811	Alexander, 3rd Earl of Fife	
1811–1857	James, 4th Earl of Fife	
1857–1879	James, 5th Earl of Fife	
1879–1889	Alexander, 5th Earl of Fife, 1st Duke of Fife	
1889–1900	John, 3rd Marquess of Bute	
1900–1945	Lord Colum Crichton-Stuart	
SECOND BENEDICTINE PRIORY AND FIRST ABBEY
1945–1948	Dom Benedict Steuart	Titular Prior of Pluscarden
1948–1951	Dom Brendan McHugh	Local Superior and acting Prior
1950	Dom Wilfred Upson	Abbot of Prinknash (1938–1963) declared de jure Prior of Pluscarden by Lord Lyon, King of Arms
1951–1961	Dom Norbert Cowen	Local Superior and acting Prior
1963	Dom Dyfrig Rushton	Abbot of Prinknash (1963–1979) and Major Superior of Pluscarden Abbey (1963–66)
1961–1966	Dom Columba Wynne	Local Superior and acting Prior
1966	Pluscarden becomes an independent conventual Priory	
1966–1974	Dom Alfred Spencer	Conventual Prior
1974	Pluscarden becomes an Abbey	
1974–1992	Dom Alfred Spencer	1st Abbot of Pluscarden
1992–2011	Dom Hugh Gilbert	2nd Abbot of Pluscarden. From 2011 Bishop of Aberdeen Diocese
2011–2024	Dom Anselm Atkinson	3rd Abbot of Pluscarden and Abbot Visitor of the English Province of the Subiaco Congregation of Benedictines 2003—2019. Resigned July 1, 2024

* The exact tenure of the prior is unknown

== See also ==
- Catholic Church in Scotland
- List of monastic houses in Scotland

== Bibliography ==
- Anson, P. F.: A Monastery in Moray, London, 1959
- Birch, W. De Gray Ordinale Conventus Vallis Caulium. London, 1900
- Bower, W. Scotichronicon, Watt, D. E. R. (ed.) Aberdeen, 1987, vol. 8
- Hannah, I. C. '"Screens and lofts in Scottish churches", Proc Soc Antiq Scot
- Historia Gentis Scotorum, ed. Skene, W. F. (Historians of Scotland; vols. 1 & 4), Edinburgh, 1871–2
- Macphail, S. R. History of the Religious House of Pluscardyn. Edinburgh, 1881
- McCormick, Finbar "Excavations at Pluscarden Priory, Moray'", Proc Soc Antiq Scot
- Webster, J. Dunfermline Abbey. Dunfermline, 1948
