= Urquhart Priory =

Priory in Moray, Scotland

Coordinates: 57°38′58″N 3°11′35″W

Urquhart Priory was a Benedictine monastic community in Moray; the priory was dedicated to the Holy Trinity. It was founded by King David I of Scotland in 1136 as a cell of Dunfermline Abbey in the aftermath of the defeat of King Óengus of Moray. It remained a dependency of Dunfermline.

In 1453, John Bonally, the Prior of Urquhart formally requested from the Pope that his monastery and Pluscarden be merged. At that time, Urquhart had only two monks and Pluscarden had six. A papal bull was issued by Nicholas V on 12 March 1453 joining the priories and from then on Pluscarden became a daughter house of the Benedictine Dunfermline Abbey. Pluscarden was chosen over Urquhart for the priory location as the buildings were larger and thought easier to restore and Bonally was appointed as its first Benedictine prior.

The site was abandoned; there are no surface remains of the priory, although stones are occasionally ploughed up.

== See also ==
- Prior of Urquhart, for a list of priors and commendators

== Bibliography ==
- Cowan, Ian B. & Easson, David E., Medieval Religious Houses: Scotland With an Appendix on the Houses in the Isle of Man, Second Edition, (London, 1976), p. 61
- Watt, D.E.R. & Shead, N.F. (eds.), The Heads of Religious Houses in Scotland from the 12th to the 16th Centuries, The Scottish Records Society, New Series, Volume 24, (Edinburgh, 2001), pp. 213–16
