= George Learmond =

Scottish Benedictine

George Learmond (or Learmonth) (c. 1478–1531) was a Scottish Benedictine who was Prior of Pluscarden and almost Bishop of Aberdeen. He was probably born around 1478, graduated Master of Arts from the University of St Andrews in 1498 and maintained links with the university while holding benefices in St Andrews (1498–1503) and Fordoun in Kincardineshire (1503–1509).

Following the resignation of Robert Harwor he was nominated Prior of Pluscarden by King James IV of Scotland in March 1509. As the late Abbot Mark Dilworth observed in Pluscarden Benedictines 129 (Pentecost 2003, pp. 16–17) the monastery enjoyed a certain autonomy and neither the abbot nor chapter of Dunfermline Abbey were involved in Learmonth's election. He held the office for twenty years, having taken the monastic habit, and very little is recorded of his activities; presumably his monastic life was quiet.

It was not to last, however: he was plucked from the cloister on 20 May 1529 when Pope Clement VII appointed him coadjutor and successor to Bishop Gavin Dunbar, although Learmonth predeceased the Bishop of Aberdeen, dying on 18 March 1531.
