= Colin Mackenzie, 1st Earl of Seaforth =

Scottish nobleman and Highland clan chief

Colin Mackenzie, 1st Earl of Seaforth (c.1596/97 – c.1633), was a Highland clan chief and Scottish nobleman, possessed of vast estates and wealth.

== Origins ==
Mackenzie, nicknamed "Ruadh" (i.e. "Red"), was the eldest son of Kenneth Mackenzie, 1st Lord Mackenzie of Kintail by his first wife, Ann, daughter of George Ross of Balnagown. The Mackenzies were a clan from Ross-shire that had risen to prominence in the 15th century during the disintegration of the Lordship of the Isles.

== The final subjection of Lewis ==
Mackenzie was only 14 when his father died in 1611, and the clan territories were therefore entrusted to his uncle, Sir Roderick Mackenzie of Coigach, the "Tutor of Kintail". Upon Lord Mackenzie's death, Neil Macleod and other members of the Macleods of Lewis, whom Lord Mackenzie had recently subdued, rose in rebellion in Lewis. A number of commissions against them were granted between 1611 and 1616 to the Tutor of Kintail, Colin Mackenzie of Killin, Murdo Mackenzie of Kernsary, Alexander Mackenzie of Coul and Kenneth Mackenze of Davochmaluag, while neighbouring chiefs (Donald Gorm Macdonald of Sleat, Roderick Macleod of Harris, Hugh Mackay of Farr and his son, and MacNeill of Barra) were forbidden to assist the rebels. Neil Macleod himself was captured and executed in Edinburgh in April 1613, but the turbulence continued. By a special commission from the king dated 14 September 1614, the Mackenzies were exempted by reason of their involvement in Lewis from engaging in the resolution of a dispute between two factions of the Clan Cameron (acting as proxies for the Marquis of Huntly and the Earl of Argyll). Once it had again eventually been brought under control, Lewis remained in the possession of the Mackenzies of Kintail until it was sold to Sir James Matheson in 1844.

== Acquisition of further territory and wealth ==
At the death of Lord Mackenzie, his estates were very heavily burdened in consequence of the feud with Clan MacDonell of Glengarry and various family difficulties and debts. The Tutor of Kintail completed the compromise of the disputes with Glengarry that had been commenced by Lord Mackenzie and otherwise devoted himself to his nephew's affairs to such effect that the estates were freed before Colin came of age, leaving him "master of an opulent fortune and of great [feudal] superiorities". In particular, he acquired the superiority of Trotternish with the heritable Stewartry of the Isle of Skye, and the superiority of Raasay and other islands. The Earl of Cromartie said: "This Colin was a noble person of virtuous endowments, beloved of all good men, especially his Prince. He acquired and settled the right of the superiority of Moidart and Arisaig, the Captain of Clandonald's lands, which his father, Lord Kenneth, formerly claimed right to but lived not to accomplish it. Thus, all the Highlands and Islands from Ardnamurchan to Strathnaver were either Mackenzie's property, or under his vassalage, some few excepted, and all about him were tied to his family by very strict bonds of friendship or vassalage, which, as it did beget respect from many it be got envy in others, especially his equals."

Such wealth was not easily acquired: both the Tutor of Kintail and, in due course, Colin were criticized for imposing high entries and rents on Colin's Kintail and West Coast tenants. Indeed, a Gaelic proverb in common currency was "There are two things worse than the Tutor of Kintail: frost in spring and mist in the dog-days".

== Royal favour ==
Mackenzie's favour with King James, as referred to by the Earl of Cromartie, is well demonstrated by his elevation in December 1623 to the Earldom of Seaforth (the name of the sea loch dividing Lewis from Harris) and Viscountcy of Fortrose. On his last visit to London (at which the king also complimented him on being the best archer in Britain), Mackenzie was disturbed to be told by the king that his loyalty had been called into question by an anonymous source. However, the king's confidence in him remained apparently unshaken.

== Extravagance ==
Mackenzie did not aim at economy, and spent vast sums in securing his superiority over Moidart and Arisaig in a legal dispute with the Earl of Argyll. He added greatly to the castle of Chanonry and also built Brahan Castle. The Reverend John Macrae (d. 1704) recorded that he "lived most of his time at Chanonry in great state and very magnificently. He annually imported his wines from the Continent, and kept a store for his wines, beers, and other liquors, from which he replenished his fleet on his voyages round the West Coast and the Lewis, when he made a circular voyage every year or at least every two years round his own estates … It is scarcely credible what allowance was made for his table of Scotch and French wines during these trips amongst his people … I have heard my grandfather, Mr Farquhar MacRa (then Constable of the Castle) say that the Earl never came to his house with less than 300 and sometimes 500 men."

== Piety ==
Mackenzie and his wife had reputations for personal piety. They went yearly to take the sacrament from the Rev. Thomas Campbell, minister of Carmichael, South Lanarkshire, and usually had more than one chaplain in their house. Mackenzie provided the kirks of Lewis without being obliged to do so, as also the five kirks of Kintail, Loch Alsh, Lochcarron, Lochbroom, and Gairloch (of all of which he was patron), with valuable books from London, the works of the latest and best authors. He also laid the foundation for a church in Strathconan and Strathbran. He mortified 4000 merks for the Grammar School of Chanonry, and had several works of piety in his view to perform if his death had not prevented it.

== Marriage and family ==
Mackenzie married Margaret Seton, the daughter of Alexander Seton, 1st Earl of Dunfermline, the Lord Chancellor of Scotland. Their only son, Alexander, died of smallpox at Chanonry on 3 June 1629. Margaret was a close friend of her neighbour, Anne Gordon, Countess of Moray. Margaret died at Edinburgh on 20 February 1631, after which Mackenzie contracted a lingering sickness which confined him to his chamber for some time before his death. He died at Chanonry on 15 April 1633 and was succeeded in his title and estates by his brother, George.

He was survived by two daughters. Anne (d. 1705) married, first, Alexander Lindsay, later first Earl of Balcarres, and, secondly, Archibald Campbell, 9th Earl of Argyll. Jean married, first, John Sinclair, Master of Berriedale, and secondly, Alexander Sutherland, first Lord Duffus.

Coat of arms of Colin Mackenzie, 1st Earl of Seaforth
Crest A Mountain in Flames proper Escutcheon Azure a Stag's Head cabossed Or Supporters On either side a Savage wreathed about the temples and loins with Laurel holding in the exterior hand a Baton erect with Fire issuing out of the top all proper Motto Luceo Non Uro

== Line of Chiefs ==
Preceded by Kenneth Mackenzie	Chief of Clan Mackenzie; 1611–1633	Succeeded by George Mackenzie
Peerage of Scotland
New creation	Earl of Seaforth; 1623–1633	Succeeded by George Mackenzie
Preceded by Kenneth Mackenzie	Lord Mackenzie of Kintail; 1611–1633	Succeeded by George Mackenzie
