= Leuglay =

- Commune
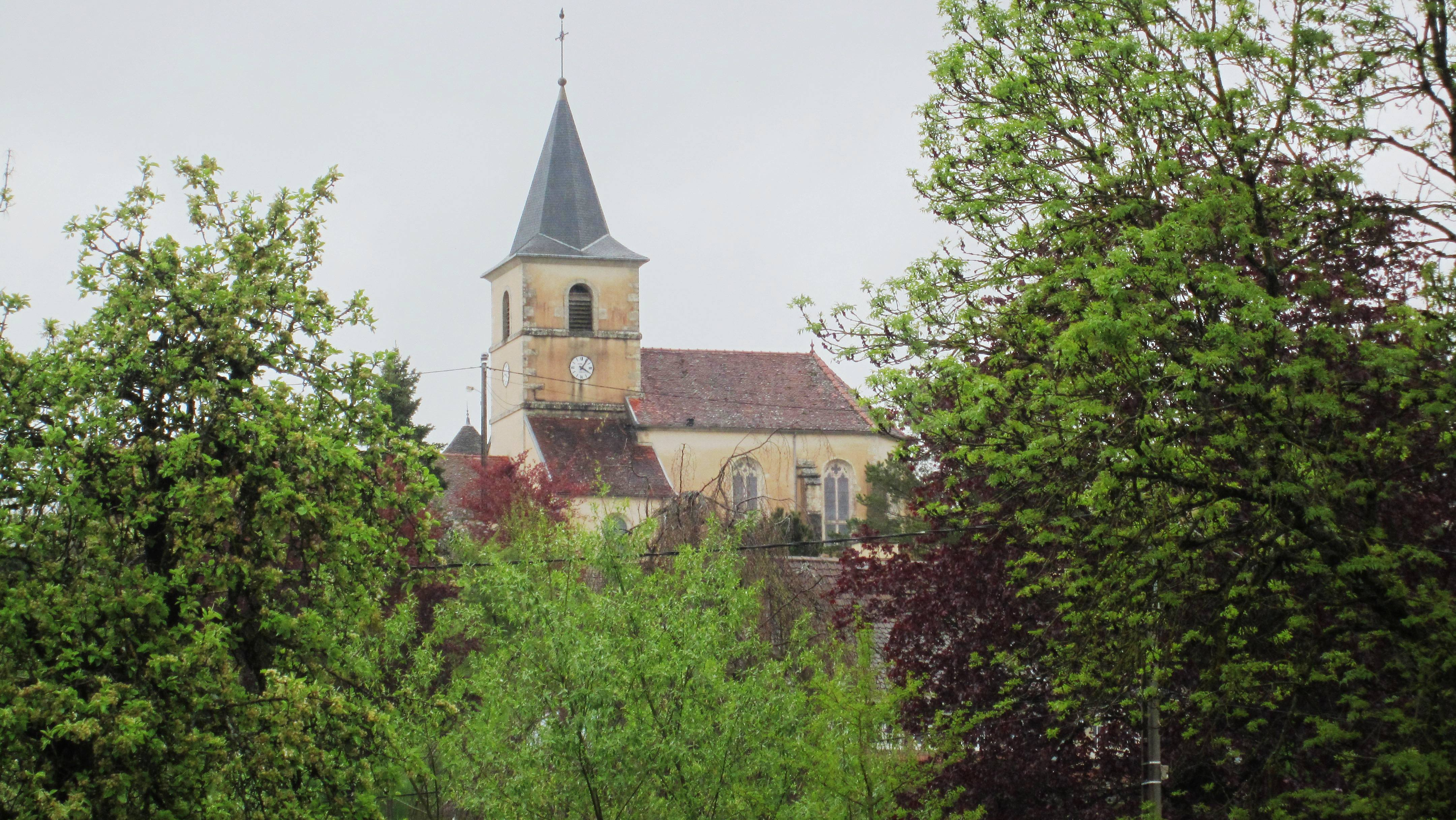
- The church in Leuglay

- Coat of arms
- Location of Leuglay
- Location within France Location within Bourgogne-Franche-Comté
- Coordinates: 47°48′54″N 4°47′34″E
- Country: France
- Region: Bourgogne-Franche-Comté
- Department: Côte-d'Or
- Arrondissement: Montbard
- Canton: Châtillon-sur-Seine
- Intercommunality: Pays Châtillonnais

Government
  - Mayor (2020–2026): Frédéric Naudet
- Area^{1}: 24.56 km^{2} (9.48 sq mi)
- Elevation: 268 m (879 ft)
- Highest elevation: 417 m (1,368 ft)
- Lowest elevation: 260 m (850 ft)
- Population (2023): 283
  - Density: 11.5/km^{2} (29.8/sq mi)
- Time zone: UTC+01:00 (CET)
  - Summer (DST): UTC+02:00 (CEST)
- INSEE/Postal code: 21346 /21290
- ^{1} French Land Register data, which excludes lakes, ponds, glaciers > 1 km^{2} (0.386 sq mi or 247 acres) and river estuaries.

Leuglay (French pronunciation: [lœɡlɛ]) is a commune in the Côte-d'Or department in eastern France.

== Population ==
Historical population
Year	Pop.	±% p.a.
1968	590	—
1975	570	−0.49%
1982	517	−1.38%
1990	448	−1.77%
1999	380	−1.81%
2007	354	−0.88%
2012	327	−1.57%
2017	306	−1.32%
2023	283	−1.29%
Source: INSEE

== See also ==
- Communes of the Côte-d'Or department
