= Ardaneaskan =

Coordinates: 57.3565°N 5.60405°W

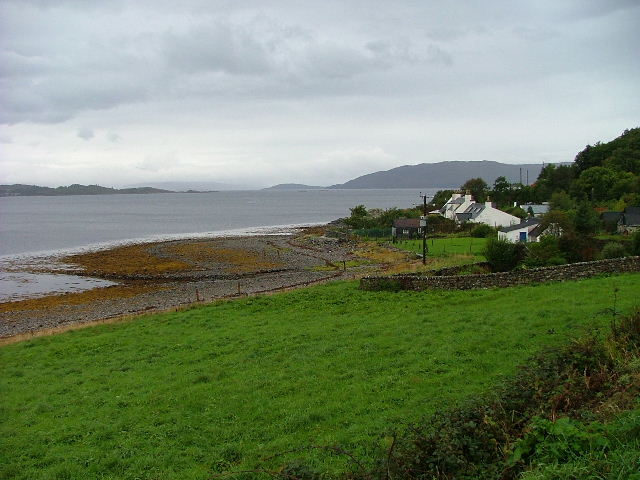
- Houses at Ardaneaskan with Loch Carron behind

- Location within the Highland council area
- OS grid reference: NG833353
- Council area: Highland
- Country: Scotland
- Sovereign state: United Kingdom
- Postcode district: IV54 8
- Police: Scotland
- Fire: Scottish
- Ambulance: Scottish
- UK Parliament: Ross, Skye and Lochaber
- Scottish Parliament: Caithness, Sutherland and Ross

Ardaneaskan (Scottish Gaelic: Àird nan Easgann) is a village on the north shore of Loch Carron in Strathcarron, Ross-shire, in Highland, and is within the Scottish council area of Highland.
