= Earl of Seaforth =

Extinct title in the Peerage of Scotland

Earldom of Seaforth
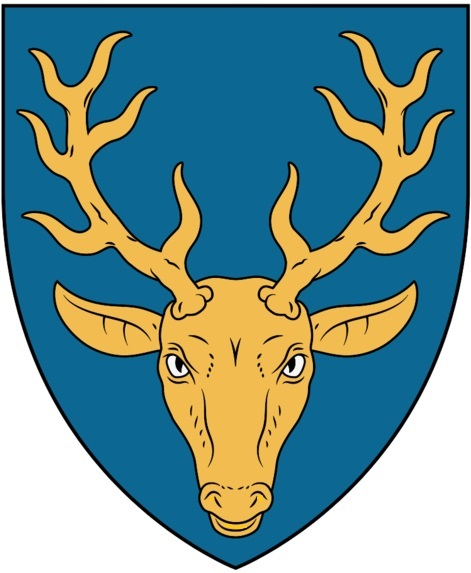
- Arms of the Earls of Seaforth
- Creation date: 3 December 1623
- Creation: First
- Created by: James I
- Peerage: Peerage of Scotland
- First holder: Colin Mackenzie, 1st Earl of Seaforth
- Last holder: Kenneth Mackenzie, 1st Earl of Seaforth
- Status: Extinct
- Extinction date: 1781
- Seat: Brahan Castle
- Motto: Luceo Non Uro ("I shine but do not burn")

Earl of Seaforth was a title in the Peerage of Scotland and the Peerage of Ireland, derived from Loch Seaforth on the coast of Lewis. It was held by the family of Mackenzie from 1623 to 1716, and again from 1771 to 1781.

== History ==
The Mackenzies trace their descent to Colin of Kintail (died 1278), and their name is a variant of Mackenneth. Kenneth, the twelfth head of the clan, was made Lord Mackenzie of Kintail in 1609, and his son Colin, who succeeded his father as 2nd Lord Mackenzie in March 1611, was created earl of Seaforth in 1623.

Colin's successor was his half-brother George (died 1651), who became the 2nd earl in 1633. George was alternately a royalist and a covenanter between 1636 and 1646, and was afterwards in Holland with Charles II, who made him Secretary of State for Scotland. His grandson, Kenneth, the 4th earl, followed James VII to France and was with the dethroned king in Ireland. Elevated by James in 1690, to Marquess of Seaforth and Viscount Fortrose (in the Jacobite peerage), he was sent to head the 1689 rising in Scotland. He was soon captured and imprisoned. He was released in 1697 and died in Paris in January 1701.

His successor was his son William, who rallied under the Jacobite standard at Braemar, during the rising of 1715, and then, having raised 3000 men, was present at the battle of Sheriffmuir and was appointed lieutenant-general of the northern counties. He also took part in the Jacobite enterprise of 1719, being wounded at Glenshiel. In 1716 he was attainted and his titles and estates forfeited; before his death in January 1740, he had been relieved of some of the penalties of his treason, although his titles were not restored. His son Kenneth (c. 1718–1761), who but for the attainder would have been the 6th earl, helped the British government during the rising of 1745, and was a member of parliament for some years.

His son Kenneth Mackenzie was created Baron of Ardelve and Viscount Fortrose in the Peerage of Ireland in 1766 and Earl of Seaforth in 1771, also in the Peerage of Ireland. However, these peerages became extinct when he died in August 1781. Although there were still heirs to the older earldom, this remained under attainder. Kenneth raised a regiment of Highlanders, the 78th (later known as 72nd) in 1778, known later as the 1st battalion of the Seaforth Highlanders.

The Seaforth title has twice been revived after the extinction of the second creation of the earldom in 1781. In 1797 the soldier and politician Francis Mackenzie was raised to the Peerage of Great Britain as Lord Seaforth, Baron Mackenzie, of Kintail in the County of Ross. He was the grandson of Colonel the Hon. Alexander Mackenzie, younger son of the fourth Earl of Seaforth of the 1623 creation and brother of the fifth Earl. All four of Lord Seaforth's sons predeceased him and on his death in 1815 the title became extinct. His daughter the Hon. Mary Elizabeth Frederica Mackenzie married as her second husband James Alexander Stewart-Mackenzie, son of Admiral Keith Stewart, third son of the sixth Earl of Galloway. Their grandson James Stewart-Mackenzie was a soldier, politician and philanthropist. In 1921 the barony of Seaforth held by his great-great-grandfather was revived when he was raised to the Peerage of the United Kingdom as Baron Seaforth, of Brahan, in Urray in the County of Ross and Cromarty. He was childless and the title became extinct on his death in 1923.

== List of titleholders ==
=== Lords Mackenzie of Kintail (1609) ===
- Kenneth Mackenzie, 1st Lord Mackenzie of Kintail (died 1610/11)
- Colin Mackenzie, 2nd Lord Mackenzie of Kintail (died 1633) (created Earl of Seaforth in 1623)

=== Earls of Seaforth (1623) ===
- Colin Mackenzie, 1st Earl of Seaforth (died 1633)
- George Mackenzie, 2nd Earl of Seaforth (died 1651)
- Kenneth Mackenzie, 3rd Earl of Seaforth (1635–1678)
- Kenneth Mackenzie, 4th Earl of Seaforth (1661–1701)
- William Mackenzie, 5th Earl of Seaforth (died 1740) (Declared forfeit 7 May 1716)

=== Earls of Seaforth (1771) ===
- Kenneth Mackenzie, 1st Earl of Seaforth (c. 1744–1781) (extinct)

=== Barons Seaforth (1797) ===
- Francis Humberston Mackenzie, 1st Baron Seaforth (1754–1815)

=== Barons Seaforth (1921) ===
- James Alexander Francis Humberston Stewart-Mackenzie, 1st Baron Seaforth (1847–1923)

== See also ==
- Clan Mackenzie
- Mackenzie Baronets
- Earl of Galloway
- Brahan Castle
