= Gentleman Adventurers of Fife =

The Gentleman Adventurers of Fife or Fife Adventurers were a group of 11 noblemen-colonists, largely from eastern Fife, awarded rights from King James VI to colonise the Isle of Lewis in 1598.

== Background ==
In 1597, the MacLeod clan chiefs were served with papers from the government stating that despite their centuries-long feudal tenure of the Isle of Lewis, their lack of legal paperwork exposed the lands to claims from the Crown. This stemmed from an act of Parliament requiring all Highland clan chiefs to prove legal ownership of their land.

This head-over-heels legislation exposed many long-held ancestral lands to seizure. The generally title-less lands of the Highlands and islands became a target for the more document-conscious Lowlanders. Legally trained nobility were the first to take opportunity of this, creating papers for lands with which they had no historical connection.

== The re-colonisation of Lewis ==
King James VI had the aim of beginning the "civilising" or "de-Gaelicisation" of the islands and had much in common with the Plantation of Ulster which occurred some years later. James regarded the need for civilisation as sufficiently important to employ "slauchter, mutilation, fyre-raising, or utheris inconvenieties" if necessary. In fact, he had initially planned to murder all of the native inhabitants in order to facilitate settlement, but was persuaded to abandon this plan as impractical.

Most notable were the Gentleman Adventurers. In 1598, a group of noblemen, several from east Fife, sought the approval of King James for the colonisation of the Isle of Lewis. This had at its core a concept to exploit the island's natural resources. The noblemen were Patrick Leslie of Lindores, James Learmonth of Balcomie, Sir James Anstruther, Master of Household to Anne of Denmark, James Spens of Wormieston, Sir James Sandilands of Slamannan, Cpt William Murray, John Forret of Fingask, Sir William Stewart, Commendator of Pittenweem, Sir George Home of Wedderburn and his son David Home, and the Duke of Lennox, the king's cousin. The Parliament of Scotland granted the adventurers an "infestment" of the lands of Lewis.

The Gentlemen Adventurers of Fife arrived at the Isle of Lewis by ship from St Andrews in 1599 with a private army of 600 men.

A settlement of primitive houses was created on the Lewis coast near where Stornoway now stands, in an area now called South Beach.

The Clan Macleod were feudal lords of Lewis and the then clan chief Roderick Macleod sent his sons, Neil and Murdoch, to harass the new settlers. Murdoch, in particular, was a man of much learning, and was trained in the law, rather than being an illiterate pagan as the settlers purported. He served the settlers with legal papers stating the illegality of their actions. Failing any action Murdoch attacked the settlement and captured their ship and James Learmonth whom he detained for 6 months.

Soon after Neil Macleod attacked the settlement with 200 men, killing 20 settlers, and seizing their property and livestock. A power struggle then began between the Macleod brothers and Neil agreed to surrender Murdoch to the remaining settlers in exchange for a pardon for his own crimes, in a court in Edinburgh. However, the agreement soured, and on return to Lewis he killed a further 60 settlers in anger.

Although the Adventurers were forced to return to Fife, MacKenzie of Kintail a rival clan, was given free leave by the Crown to attack the island of Lewis in exchange for its land, and was pushed into hunting down Neil Macleod who was eventually captured on the island of Berisay.

Neil Macleod was taken to Edinburgh by ship and put on trial. On 30 March 1613, he was charged with fire-raising, murder, theft and piracy. He was hanged at the Mercat Cross on the Royal Mile on 1 April. He was not beheaded whilst alive (a punishment reserved for noblemen) but his head was removed post mortem and was placed on a spike above the Nether Bow Port. His lands were forfeited to the Crown.

== Kintyre ==
James VI backed another scheme in August 1598 to establish colonists on the Kintyre peninsula on the west of Scotland. The Privy Council of Scotland hired Robert Jameson's ship to carry the king to Kintyre. Robert Jameson was instructed to hire sailors in Ayr and borrow suitable weapons and cannon in the town. This expedition was cancelled. James VI had planned to dispossess the landholders and install a colony of settlers from Fife. The previous inhabitants of Kintyre would have had to resettle in Ireland.

== See also ==
- Anglicisation
- Colonisation
