= Kenneth Mackenzie, 1st Lord Mackenzie of Kintail =

Scottish Highland clan chief (c. 1569–1611)

Kenneth Mackenzie, the first Lord Mackenzie of Kintail (c. 1569 – 1611), was a Highland clan chief who secured for himself and his heirs the entirety of the Isle of Lewis in the Outer Hebrides and successfully pursued a bloody feud with the Macdonells of Glengarry.

== Origins ==
Mackenzie was the son of Colin Cam Mackenzie of Kintail (died 14 june 1594, aged 38) and Elisabeth Stewart (died aged 58) Daughter Barbara Grant, Lady of Freuchie, Baroness of Kintail 1551-1591 Married in Ross, Scotland. of John Grant of Grant. The Mackenzies were a clan from Ross-shire that had risen to prominence in the 15th century during the disintegration of the Lordship of the Isles.

== Political advancement ==
On 9 November 1594, soon after his father's death, Mackenzie made oath in presence of the King and the Privy Council that he would "faithfully, loyally, and truly concur, fortify, and assist his Majesty's Lieutenant of the North with his advice and force at all times and occasions as he may be required by proclamations, missive letters, or otherwise."

Under date of 18 February 1595 – 1596, there is an entry in the records of the Privy Council that Kenneth Mackenzie of Kintail "being elected and chosen to be one of the ordinary members" of the Council, and being personally present, makes faith and gives oath in the usual manner. Mackenzie's connections to central government were to prove invaluable to him in the turbulent times that lay ahead. He proved himself to be a masterful political operator but even he had to deal with potentially serious setbacks and the Privy Council's records show that he was on at least one occasion imprisoned in Edinburgh Castle.

Mackenzie was one of the eight Lesser Barons who constituted the Lords of the Articles in the Scottish Parliament which met for the first time on 17 June 1609. Although he was raised to the peerage on 19 November 1609, by the title of Lord Mackenzie of Kintail, he was not so designated in the Privy Council Records until 31 May 1610, when the patent of his creation was read and received by their Lordships, and he was thereupon acknowledged to be a free baron in all time coming. Mackenzie's peerage accompanied his final triumph in his long campaign for the Isle of Lewis.

== The conquest of Lewis ==
Mackenzie's greatest opportunity arose from an internecine struggle within the Macleods of Lewis. Roderick "Old Ruari" Macleod of Lewis (c.1500-c.1595) divorced his wife, Janet (the daughter of John Mackenzie 9th of Kintail and therefore Kenneth Mackenzie's great-aunt), and disowned his son by her, Torquil Cononach Macleod. By another wife, Roderick had another son, Torquil Dubh Macleod. After Roderick's death, Torquil Dubh retained Lewis, but Torquil Cononach (who had the support of central government) held the mainland Macleod estates at Coigach and Loch Broom. Torquil Cononach had no sons. His daughter and co-heir, Margaret, married Mackenzie's brother, Roderick (progenitor of the Earls of Cromartie), and the Mackenzies accordingly took up his cause against Torquil Dubh.

In 1596/7, Mackenzie complained to the king of attacks made by Torquil Dubh on Coigach and Loch Broom. When Torquil Dubh failed to appear before the Privy Council on 11 February 1596/7, he was denounced as a rebel and Mackenzie obtained a commission of fire and sword against him. Torquil Dubh's rights to Lewis were forfeited and he himself was captured and beheaded in July 1597. Torquil Cononach surrendered his rights in Lewis to Mackenzie and identified Roderick Mackenzie as his heir in respect of Coigach and Loch Broom.

However, a new obstacle to Mackenzie's campaign of self-aggrandisement now arose. In 1598, Lewis was granted to the Fife adventurers, with the professed object of civilising the inhabitants. Their colonising efforts over the next several years met with vigorous local resistance, which was intermittently and discreetly assisted by Mackenzie.

At a meeting of the Privy Council, held at Edinburgh on 30 September 1605, Mackenzie received a commission to act for the King against Neil MacNeill of Barra, the Captain of Clanranald, and several other Highland and Island chiefs, who had "of late amassed together a force and company of the barbarous and rebellious thieves and limmers of the Isles," and with them entered Lewis, "assailed the camp of his Majesty's good subjects," and "committed barbarous and detestable murders and slaughters upon them." Mackenzie was in consequence commissioned to pursue these offenders with fire and sword, by sea or land. This was the beginning of Mackenzie's conquest of Lewis.

Mackenzie received another commission in Lewis on 1 September 1607 against Neil Macleod, another of Old Ruari's sons, who was conducting a guerilla campaign against the Fife adventurers and had recently captured the Castle of Stornoway. This commission was to continue in force for six months.

Mackenzie at one point succeeded in fortifying his rights under Torquil Cononach's resignation with a deed under the Great Seal confirming his ownership of Lewis, but was compelled to surrender his rights to the King, who vested them in 1608 in Lord Balmerino (later forfeited for treason), Sir George Hay and Sir James Spens of Wormistoun. By covert support for local resistance, Mackenzie once again skilfully undermined their campaign to assert their rights, with the eventual result that they sold them to him for a substantial sum and a lease of his woods at Letterewe. Having had his rights confirmed by the King, Mackenzie returned to Lewis in 1610 with 700 men and finally brought the island to submission.

== Feud with the Macdonells of Glengarry ==
Mackenzie's feud with the Macdonells of Glengarry may be said to have its origin in the revenge taken by two cousins of Glengarry for the murder of their fathers in Lochcarron in 1580. They burned the house of one of the murderers at Applecross, killing him and his family, and also slew in his bed Donald Mackenzie, who lived at Kishorn. Kenneth Mackenzie and Glengarry both went to Edinburgh to present complaints against each other, but Mackenzie is said to have got the better of his opponent by producing before the Privy Council Donald Mackenzie's shirt, covered in his blood. Glengarry fled the city and, although repeatedly summoned, failed to put in an appearance. The Records of the Privy Council under the date show of 9 September 1602 that he was declared outlaw and rebel. A commission of fire and sword was granted to Mackenzie against him and all his followers, with a decree of ransom for the loss of those who were burnt and plundered by him, and for Kintail's charges and expenses, making altogether a very large sum.

Meanwhile, Angus Macdonell, Younger of Glengarry, had conducted a raid on Mackenzie's homeland at Kintail, killing several and carrying away a large spoil of cattle. Armed with his commission and accompanied by a large force, Mackenzie defeated Macdonell at Morar and drove back to Kintail "the largest booty ever heard of in the Highlands of Scotland". However, Glengarry's cousins continued to commit outrages, including raids on Kinlochewe and Applecross, and the conflict became broader and more general when Glengarry formed an alliance with the Macdonalds of Moidart and other Macdonalds against Mackenzie. Mackenzie, in his turn, sought assistance from his brother-in-law, Hector Og Maclean of Duart. While Mackenzie was in Mull securing Maclean's support, Glengarry's son (who was by now the real moving spirit behind the feud) launched a raid on Lochcarron. His galley was soon afterwards intercepted between Kylerhea and Kyleakin by a force of Mackenzie's men and he himself was killed, his body being brought back to Mackenzie's wife, who was holding the fort at Eilean Donan.

Glengarry himself died the following year, in 1603. A cousin of his, Allan Dubh MacRanuil of Lundie committed one further great atrocity when he burned the church of Kilchrist in Easter Ross, killing the congregation gathered inside. Glengarry's piper is said to have marched around the flames, playing a pibroch which has been known ever since by the name of "Cillechriost," as the family tune of the Macdonells of Glengarry. However, the Macdonells, despite their sanguinary excesses, were no match for the politically astute Mackenzie, who (in 1607) succeeded in obtaining a crown charter to the disputed districts of Loch Alsh, Lochcarron and others, and who steadily bought up the claims of third parties against Glengarry. Their differences were eventually settled by an arrangement which secured absolutely to Mackenzie all Glengarry's lands in Ross-shire and the superiority of all his other possessions, but Glengarry was to hold the latter, paying Mackenzie a small feu as superior.

== Marriage and children ==
Mackenzie married, first, Ann Ross, daughter of George Ross of Balnagown and had:

- Colin Mackenzie, 1st Earl of Seaforth, later became the first Earl of Seaforth
- Janet Mackenzie, who married Sir Donald Gorme Macdonald, 8th Laird of Sleat, 1st Baronet, son of Archibald Macdonald and Margaret Macdonald
- Sybella Mackenzie, who married Ian Mor Macleod of Macleod, 16th Chief
- Barbara Mackenzie, who married Donald Mackay, 1st Lord Reay

He married, secondly, Isobel Ogilvie, daughter of Sir Gilbert Ogilvie of Powrie and had:

- George Mackenzie, 2nd Earl of Seaforth, who subsequently became the second Earl of Seaforth
- Thomas Mackenzie of Pluscarden
- Simon Mackenzie of Lochallin or Lochalyne or Lochslin d. Jan. 1666, who married 6 May 1634 Elizabeth Bruce dau of Peter Bruce, Principal of St. Leonard's, son of Bruce of Fingask

== Death ==
Mackenzie died on 27 February 1611. The Earl of Cromartie said of him that he "was truly of an heroic temper, but of a spirit too great for his estates, perhaps for his country, yet bounded by his station ..."

Preceded by Colin Mackenzie	Chief of Clan Mackenzie; 1594–1611	Succeeded by Colin Mackenzie
Peerage of Scotland
New creation	Lord Mackenzie of Kintail; 1609–1611	Succeeded by Colin Mackenzie
