= Roderick Mackenzie, 4th Earl of Cromartie =

Scottish soldier and peer

The Right Honourable The Earl of Cromartie MC JP TD FSA Scot
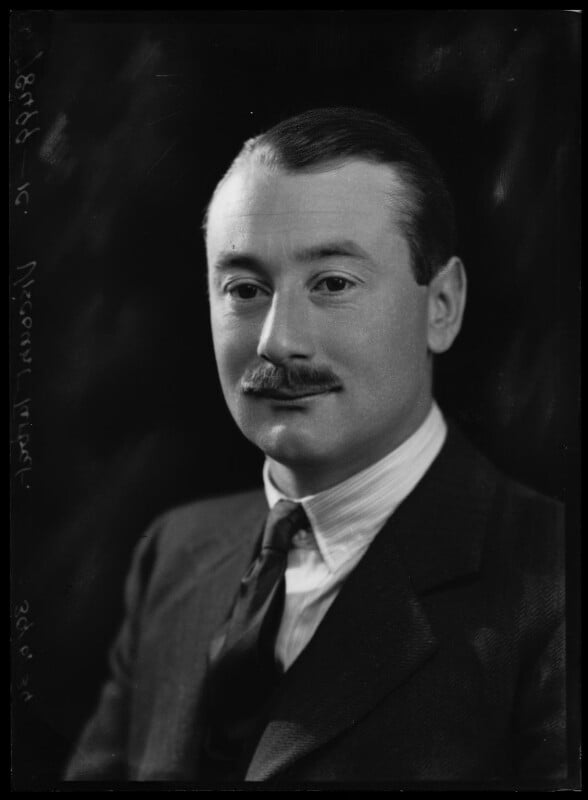
- Blunt-Mackenzie in 1934
- Known for: Chief of Clan Mackenzie
- Born: Roderick Grant Francis Blunt-Mackenzie; 24 October 1904
- Died: 13 December 1989 (aged 85)
- Residence: Castle Leod
- Spouses: Dorothy Downing Porter (m. 1933; div. 1945) Olga Laurence Mendoza (m. 1947; div. 1962) Lilian Janet Garvie Richard (m. 1962)
- Education: Charterhouse School
- Alma mater: Royal Military College, Sandhurst
- Children: 3
- Relatives: Constance Stewart-Richardson (aunt)

Roderick Grant Francis Blunt-Mackenzie, 4th Earl of Cromartie, MC, JP, TD, FSA Scot (24 October 1904 – 13 December 1989) was a Scottish soldier and peer. In 1979, he was recognised as the chief of Clan Mackenzie.

== Ancestry and early life ==
Blunt-Mackenzie was born on 24 October 1904 and was baptised on 2 December 1904 at Adderbury Church, Oxfordshire. Styled Viscount Tarbat from birth, he was the eldest son of Lady Sibell Lilian Mackenzie, suo jure Countess of Cromartie and Lt.-Col. Edward Walter Blunt DL. His younger brother was the Hon. Walter Osra Blunt-Mackenzie, who served in the Royal Naval Reserve during World War II. He also had two sisters, Lady Janet Frances Isobel Blunt-Mackenzie (who died in infancy), and Lady Isobel Blunt-Mackenzie, the wife of Capt. Oscar Linda of Assynt House.

His grandfather, Francis Mackenzie, 2nd Earl of Cromartie, was the second son of George Sutherland-Leveson-Gower, 3rd Duke of Sutherland and Anne Hay-Mackenzie, 1st Countess of Cromartie (the great-great-granddaughter of George Mackenzie, 3rd Earl of Cromartie who took part in the Jacobite rising of 1745 and was attainted in 1746). His aunt, Lady Constance Mackenzie, was the wife of Sir Edward Stewart-Richardson, 15th Baronet, and was known for her semi-clad dancing for the "shilling seats" of theatres in 1910 which incurred the displeasure of Edward VII, who considered it unsuitable behaviour for a noblewoman, leading her to be barred from Court. His father was the eldest son of Maj.-Gen. Charles Harris Blunt of Adderbury Manor (the grandson of Walter Blunt, a younger son of Sir Henry Blunt, 2nd Baronet) and the former Mary Augusta Tod (a daughter of Col. James Tod, an officer of the British East India Company).

He was educated at Charterhouse School in Godalming, Surrey and the Royal Military College Sandhurst.

== Career ==
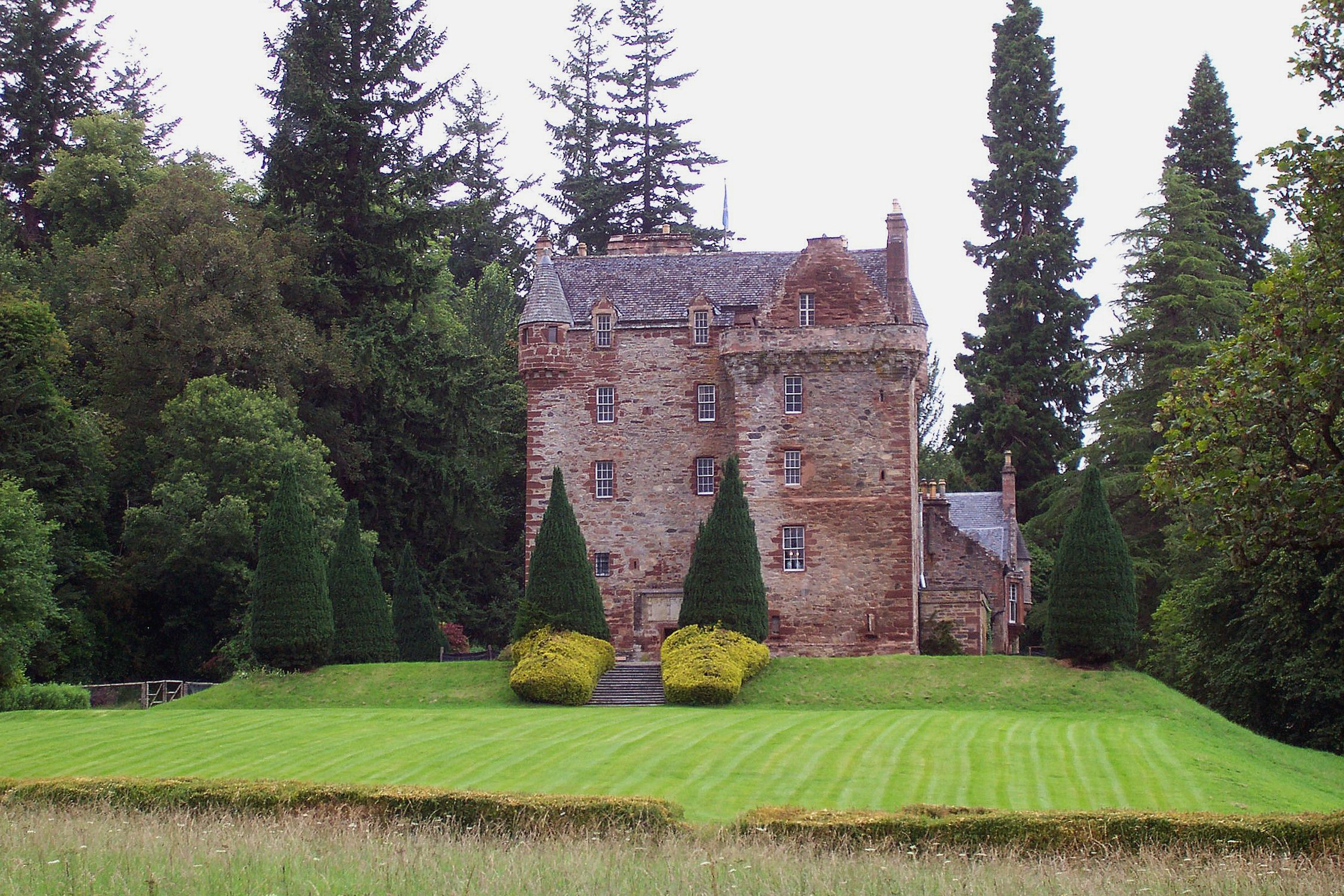
Castle Leod

In 1924, Viscount Tarbat was commissioned in the 1st Battalion of the Seaforth Highlanders, moving to the 2nd Battalion in India in 1925. He fought on the North-West Frontier (present-day Khyber Pakhtunkhwa), in 1925, before secondment to the Royal West African Frontier Force in Nigeria between 1928 and 1930. Returning to the Seaforth Highlanders in India, he again served on the Frontier, during the 1930–31 Afridi Redshirt Rebellion. In 1932 he retired from the Regular Army, and held the office of Justice of the Peace for Ross and Cromarty in 1937.

In January 1938 he joined the 4th (Territorial) Battalion of the Seaforth Highlanders. In 1939, he gained the rank of Major and in 1940, during the World War II, he fought with the 4th Seaforth in France as part of the 51st (Highland) Division. Recommended for the Military Cross for his services during the retreat to the coast, he became a prisoner of war when his unit was cut off at St Valery-en-Caux on the Channel coast in June 1940. He was awarded the Military Cross after his release in 1945. He held the office of Member of the Ross and Cromarty County Council in 1964 and was awarded the Territorial Decoration the same year. He held the office of Sheriff of Ross and Cromarty and was appointed Fellow of the Society of Antiquaries of Scotland.

He succeeded to the titles of 4th Baron Castlehaven, of Castlehaven, 4th Viscount Tarbat, of Tarbat, 4th Baron Macleod of Castle Leod, and 4th Earl of Cromartie on 20 May 1962. In 1979, Blunt-Mackenzie was recognised as Chief of the Clan Mackenzie by Lord Lyon. The seat of the Earls of Cromartie is Castle Leod, Strathpeffer, Ross-shire.

== Personal life ==
Earl of Cromartie Coat of Arms.

Lord Cromartie was married three times and the father of three children. While known as Viscount Tarbat, his first marriage took place in America on 11 March 1933 to the American divorcee, Dorothy (née Downing) Porter, a daughter of Grant Butler Downing of Kentucky. Before their divorce in 1945, they were the parents of two daughters:

- Lady Sibell Agnes Julia Blunt-Mackenzie (b. 1934), who married Francis Edward Lascelles Hadwen, eldest son of Edward Hubert Lascelles Hadwen of the Levant Consular Service, in 1953. After their divorce in 1961, she married Apputhurai Jeyarama Chandran, in 1974.
- Lady Gilean Frances Blunt-Mackenzie (b. 1936), who married architect René Eugène Welter, only son of Prof. Georges F. Welter, Consul-General for Luxembourg to Canada, in 1959. They divorced in 1973.

Dorothy later married Lt.-Col. Gunnar Gundersen of the Norwegian Army.

On 30 January 1947, he married Olga (née Laurence) Mendoza (d. 1996), the former wife of Peter Mendoza, and daughter of Stuart Laurance of Paris. Before their divorce in 1962, they were the parents of one son:

- John Ruaridh Blunt Grant Blunt-Mackenzie, 5th Earl of Cromartie (b. 1948)

On 1 December 1962, Lord Cromartie married Lilian Janet Garvie Richard, the daughter of Prof. James Walter MacLeod of Edinburgh and the former wife of Lt.-Col. D. S. Richard.

Lord Cromartie died on 13 December 1989.

Peerage of the United Kingdom
Preceded by Sibell Mackenzie	Earl of Cromartie; 1962–1989	Succeeded by John Mackenzie
