= Francis Mackenzie, 2nd Earl of Cromartie =

British peer

The Right Honourable The Earl of Cromartie
- Cromartie Coat of Arms

Personal details
- Born: Francis Sutherland-Leveson-Gower; 24 November 1852
- Died: 24 November 1893 (aged 41)
- Spouse: Hon. Lillian Janet Bosville-Macdonald (m. 1876)
- Relations: Cromartie Sutherland-Leveson-Gower, 4th Duke of Sutherland (brother); Roderick Mackenzie, 4th Earl of Cromartie (grandson)
- Children: Sibell Blunt-Mackenzie, 3rd Countess of Cromartie; Constance Stewart-Richardson

Francis Mackenzie, 2nd Earl of Cromartie (né Francis Sutherland-Leveson-Gower) (3 August 1852 – 24 November 1893) was a British peer.

== Early life ==
Francis was born on 3 August 1852 as the third son of George Sutherland-Leveson-Gower, 3rd Duke of Sutherland and Anne, Duchess of Sutherland. His elder surviving brother was Cromartie Sutherland-Leveson-Gower, 4th Duke of Sutherland. He had two sisters, Lady Florence Sutherland-Leveson-Gower (the wife of Henry Chaplin, 1st Viscount Chaplin), and Lady Alexandra Sutherland-Leveson-Gower, who died unmarried in 1891.

His father was the eldest son of George Sutherland-Leveson-Gower, 2nd Duke of Sutherland and the former Lady Harriett Howard (the third daughter of George Howard, 6th Earl of Carlisle and Lady Georgiana Cavendish, eldest daughter of William Cavendish, 5th Duke of Devonshire). His mother was the only daughter of John Hay-Mackenzie of Newhall and Cromarty (the younger brother of George Hay, 7th Marquess of Tweeddale) and the former Anne Craig (the third daughter of Sir James Gibson-Craig, 1st Baronet). She was the great-great-granddaughter of George Mackenzie, 3rd Earl of Cromartie who took part in the Jacobite rising of 1745 and was attainted in 1746).

== Career ==
Upon the death of his mother on 25 November 1888, he succeeded to the titles of 2nd Baron Castlehaven, of Castlehaven, 2nd Viscount Tarbat, of Tarbat, 2nd Baron Macleod of Castle Leod, and 2nd Earl of Cromartie on 25 November 1888. In 1879, Blunt-Mackenzie was recognised as Chief of the Clan Mackenzie by Lord Lyon. The seat of the Earls of Cromartie is Castle Leod, Strathpeffer, Ross-shire.

== Personal life ==
On 2 August 1876, Lord Francis was married to the Hon. Lillian Janet Bosville-Macdonald, the third surviving daughter of Godfrey Bosville-Macdonald, 4th Baron Macdonald and the former Maria Anne Wyndham (daughter and co-heiress of George Thomas Wyndham of Cromer Hall, Norfolk). Her aunt, Cecilia Wyndham, was the wife of Lord Alfred Paget (the sixth son of Henry Paget, 1st Marquess of Anglesey). Together, they were the parents of two daughters:

- Lady Sibell Lilian Mackenzie, suo jure Countess of Cromartie, who married Lt.-Col. Edward Walter Blunt DL, the eldest son of Maj.-Gen. Charles Harris Blunt of Adderbury Manor (the grandson of Walter Blunt, a younger son of Sir Henry Blunt, 2nd Baronet) and the former Mary Augusta Tod (a daughter of Col. James Tod, an officer of the British East India Company).
- Lady Constance Mackenzie, who married Sir Edward Stewart-Richardson, 15th Baronet, and was known for her semi-clad dancing for the "shilling seats" of theatres in 1910 which incurred the displeasure of Edward VII, who considered it unsuitable behaviour for a noblewoman, leading her to be barred from Court.

Lord Cromartie died on 24 November 1893.

Peerage of the United Kingdom
Preceded by Anne Hay-Mackenzie	Earl of Cromartie; 1888–1893	Succeeded by Sibell Lilian Blunt-Mackenzie
