= John Mackenzie, 5th Earl of Cromartie =

Scottish peer

The Right Honourable The Earl of Cromartie
- Cromartie Coat of Arms

Personal details
- Born: John Ruaridh Blunt Grant Blunt-Mackenzie; June 12, 1948 (age 77)
- Spouse(s): Helen Murray (m. 1973; div. 1983) Janet Claire Harley (after 1985)
- Children: 3
- Parent: Roderick Grant Francis Mackenzie, 4th Earl of Cromartie
- Known for: Chief of Clan Mackenzie

John Ruaridh Grant Mackenzie, 5th Earl of Cromartie (born 12 June 1948) is a Scottish engineer and peer. He is the current chief of Clan Mackenzie.

== Early life ==
He is the only child of Roderick Mackenzie, 4th Earl of Cromartie and his second wife, the former Olga (née Laurence) Mendoza (d. 1996). His mother, who was previously married to Peter Mendoza, was a daughter of Stuart Laurance of Paris. From his father's first marriage to Dorothy Downing Porter, he has two elder half-sisters, Lady Julia Blunt-Mackenzie and Lady Gilean Blunt-Mackenzie.

His paternal grandmother was Lady Sibell Lilian Mackenzie, suo jure Countess of Cromartie, who married his grandfather, Lt.-Col. Edward Walter Blunt later Blunt-Mackenzie DL (the eldest son of Maj.-Gen. Charles Harris Blunt of Adderbury Manor).

He was educated at Rannoch School, Perthshire and at Strathclyde University, Glasgow, Lanarkshire, Scotland.

== Biography ==
Lord Cromartie is registered as a Member of the Institution of Explosives Engineers (M.I.Exp.E.) as an explosives engineer.

He has held the position of Chief of Clan Mackenzie since 1980. He succeeded to the titles of 5th Baron Castlehaven, of Castlehaven, 5th Viscount Tarbat, of Tarbat, 5th Baron MacLeod of Castle Leod, and 5th Earl of Cromartie on 13 December 1989. The seat of the Earl is at Castle Leod, Strathpeffer, Ross-shire.

For most of his life he has been an active mountaineer and he has made first ascents of numerous climbs. He has been a member of the Scottish Mountaineering Club and was elected as the President of the club in 2013. He also wrote the SMC climbing guidebook Selected Climbs in Skye, which was published in 1982. He has been a trustee of the Scottish Mountaineering Trust, a charity which promotes and supports health, education and recreation in the mountains of Scotland and elsewhere, and he played a central part in brokering the Letterewe Accord on public access rights to the Letterewe estate in the 1990s, prior to the general Scottish Land Reform of 2003.

He is an enthusiastic collector of agates and specimens from his collection have been displayed at the National Museum of Scotland.

== Personal life ==
Cromartie married firstly Helen Murray, daughter of John Murray, a steelworker at Lanarkshire, in 1973, and divorced in 1983, by whom he had an only son:

- Hon. Kenneth Mackenzie (1980–1980), who died in infancy.

He married secondly Janet Clare Harley, daughter of Christopher James Harley of Strathpeffer, Ross-shire, in 1985. They have two sons:

- Colin Ruaridh Mackenzie, Viscount Tarbat (b. 1987)
- Hon. Alasdair Kenelm Stuart Mackenzie (b. 1989)

Peerage of the United Kingdom
Preceded by Roderick Mackenzie	Earl of Cromartie; 1989–present	Incumbent; Heir apparent: Colin Mackenzie, Viscount Tarbat
