= List of listed buildings in Fodderty =

This is a list of listed buildings in the parish of Fodderty in Highland, Scotland. This includes the villages of Strathpeffer and Maryburgh and surrounding areas.

== List ==
Name	Location	Date listed	Geo-coordinates	Notes	Category	LB number	Image
White Lodge	Strathpeffer		57°35′17″N 4°32′21″W		B	10949	Upload Photo
Beechwood House And Steading	Achterneed		57°36′02″N 4°31′18″W		B	7825	Upload Photo
Castle Leod	Achterneed		57°35′54″N 4°32′06″W		A	7826	Upload another image See more images
Inchvannie	Blairninich		57°36′03″N 4°30′56″W		B	7830	Upload Photo
Highland Hotel	Strathpeffer		57°35′15″N 4°32′24″W		B	7861	Upload Photo
Strathpeffer Railway Station	Strathpeffer		57°35′24″N 4°32′05″W		B	7834	Upload another image See more images
Strathview and Kildonan	Strathpeffer		57°35′25″N 4°32′21″W		C(S)	7838	Upload Photo
Ben Wyvis Hotel and Gate Piers	Strathpeffer		57°35′21″N 4°32′14″W		C(S)	7852	Upload another image
Eaglestone House	Strathpeffer		57°35′27″N 4°32′15″W		B	7856	Upload Photo
Episcopal Church Of St Anne	Strathpeffer		57°35′13″N 4°32′19″W		B	7857	Upload another image
Heatherlie	Strathpeffer		57°35′18″N 4°32′22″W		B	7860	Upload another image
Ussie Mills, Steading	Maryburgh		57°34′33″N 4°26′34″W		B	13620	Upload Photo
Nicolson Mackenzie Memorial Hospital	Strathpeffer		57°35′13″N 4°32′37″W		B	13238	Upload Photo
Keppoch	Fodderty		57°36′10″N 4°30′12″W		C(S)	7831	Upload Photo
Strathpeffer Parish Church (Church Of Scotland)	Strathpeffer		57°35′11″N 4°32′27″W		B	7832	Upload Photo
The Red House	Strathpeffer		57°35′26″N 4°32′09″W		B	7839	Upload Photo
Old Cononbridge Tollhouse	Maryburgh		57°34′09″N 4°26′33″W		B	7849	Upload Photo
Dunichen	Strathpeffer		57°35′26″N 4°32′24″W		B	7854	Upload Photo
Hamilton House	Strathpeffer		57°35′13″N 4°32′23″W		C(S)	7859	Upload Photo
Kinnettas House	Strathpeffer		57°35′13″N 4°32′28″W		B	7863	Upload Photo
Fodderty Old Burial Ground	Fodderty		57°35′58″N 4°29′27″W		C(S)	7829	Upload Photo
Strathpeffer Pump Room	Strathpeffer		57°35′13″N 4°32′18″W		B	7833	Upload Photo
Spa Cottage	Strathpeffer		57°35′15″N 4°32′19″W		B	7835	Upload Photo
Sunny Holm, Proby Street	Maryburgh		57°34′29″N 4°26′22″W		C(S)	7850	Upload Photo
Millnain Mill	Blairninich		57°35′55″N 4°30′17″W		C(S)	7851	Upload Photo
Castle Leod Gate Lodge, Gate Piers and Gates	Achterneed		57°35′37″N 4°31′49″W		B	7827	Upload another image
Strathpeffer Spa Pavilion	Strathpeffer		57°35′14″N 4°32′15″W		B	7836	Upload another image See more images
Craigivar	Strathpeffer		57°35′16″N 4°32′15″W		C(S)	7853	Upload Photo
Dunraven Lodge Hotel	Strathpeffer		57°35′27″N 4°32′29″W		B	7855	Upload Photo
Holly Lodge Hotel	Strathpeffer		57°35′24″N 4°32′23″W		B	7862	Upload Photo
Nutwood Steading	Strathpeffer		57°35′31″N 4°32′16″W		C(S)	13239	Upload Photo
Timaru	Strathpeffer		57°35′26″N 4°32′12″W		B	7840	Upload Photo
Strathpeffer Free Church Of Scotland	Strathpeffer		57°35′21″N 4°32′21″W		B	7858	Upload Photo
Fodderty Lodge	Fodderty		57°35′56″N 4°29′22″W		C(S)	7828	Upload Photo
Strathpeffer Hotel	Strathpeffer		57°35′21″N 4°32′16″W		C(S)	7837	Upload Photo
Timuka	Strathpeffer		57°35′27″N 4°32′11″W		C(S)	7841	Upload Photo

== Key ==
The scheme for classifying buildings in Scotland is:

- Category A: "buildings of national or international importance, either architectural or historic; or fine, little-altered examples of some particular period, style or building type."
- Category B: "buildings of regional or more than local importance; or major examples of some particular period, style or building type, which may have been altered."
- Category C: "buildings of local importance; lesser examples of any period, style, or building type, as originally constructed or moderately altered; and simple traditional buildings which group well with other listed buildings."

In March 2016 there were 47,288 listed buildings in Scotland. Of these, 8% were Category A, and 50% were Category B, with the remaining 42% being Category C.

== See also ==
- List of listed buildings in Highland
