= Lady Constance Stewart-Richardson =

British dancer and author

Constance Stewart-Richardson
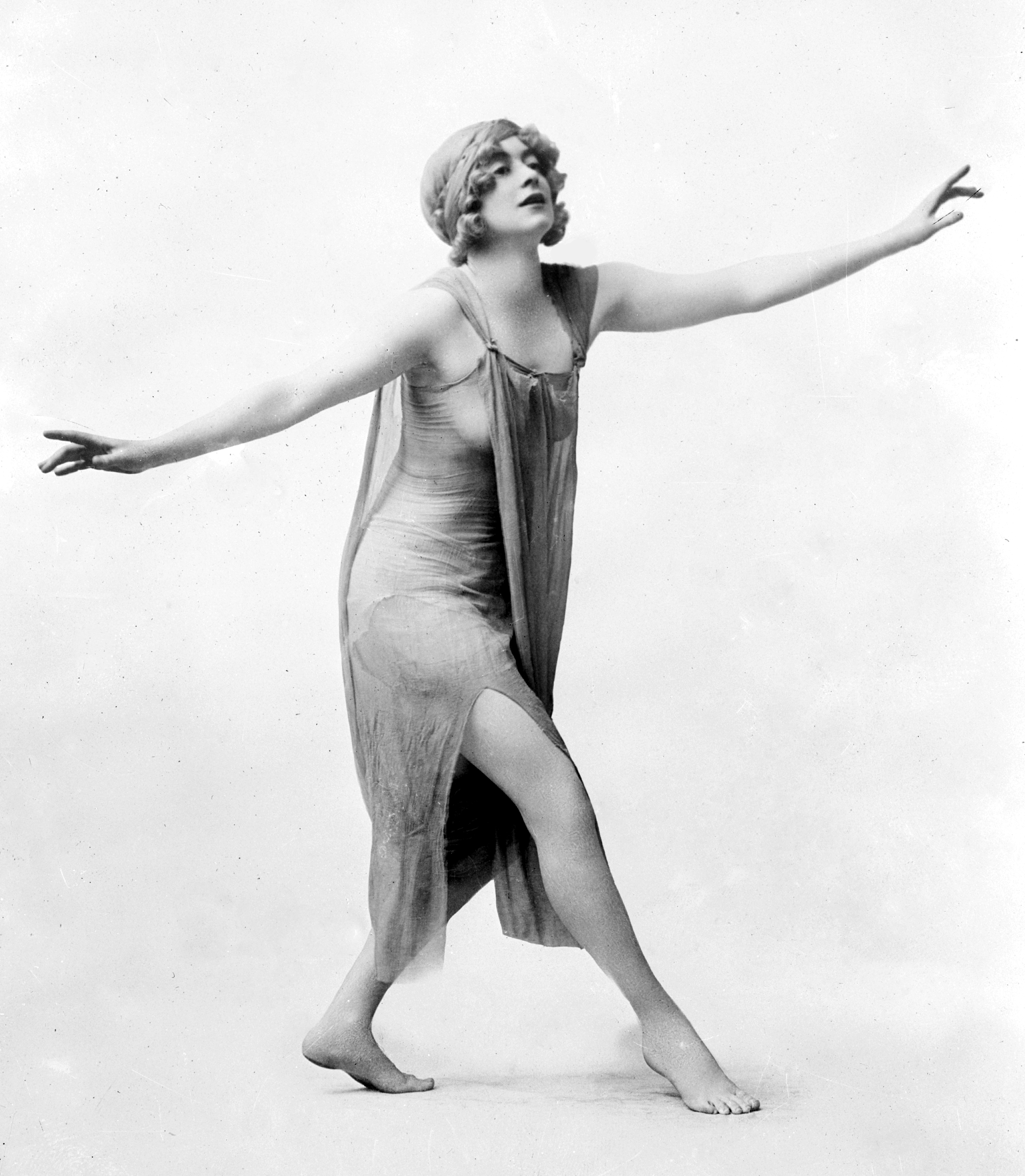
- Lady Constance Stewart-Richardson
- Born: 6 April 1882; Belgravia, London, England
- Died: 24 November 1932 (aged 50); London, England
- Spouse(s): Edward Stewart-Richardson (m. 1904; died 1914) Dennis Matthew (m. 1921)
- Children: 3
- Father: Francis Mackenzie

Lady Constance Stewart-Richardson (née Mackenzie; later Matthew; 6 April 1882 – 24 November 1932) was a British dancer and author.

== Biography ==
She was a daughter of Francis Mackenzie Sutherland-Leveson-Gower, 2nd Earl of Cromartie (1852–1893) and sister of Sibell Lilian Blunt-Mackenzie, 3rd Countess of Cromartie (1878–1962). Her paternal grandparents were George Sutherland-Leveson-Gower, 3rd Duke of Sutherland, and Anne Hay-Mackenzie, 1st Countess of Cromartie.

In 1904, Constance married Sir Edward Austin Stewart-Richardson, 15th Baronet (1872–1914) and bore him two sons. She lived in Pitfour Castle in Perthshire.

In 1910 her semi-clad dancing for the "shilling seats" of theatres incurred the displeasure of Edward VII, who considered it unsuitable behaviour for a noblewoman, and she was barred from Court – which constituted social death.

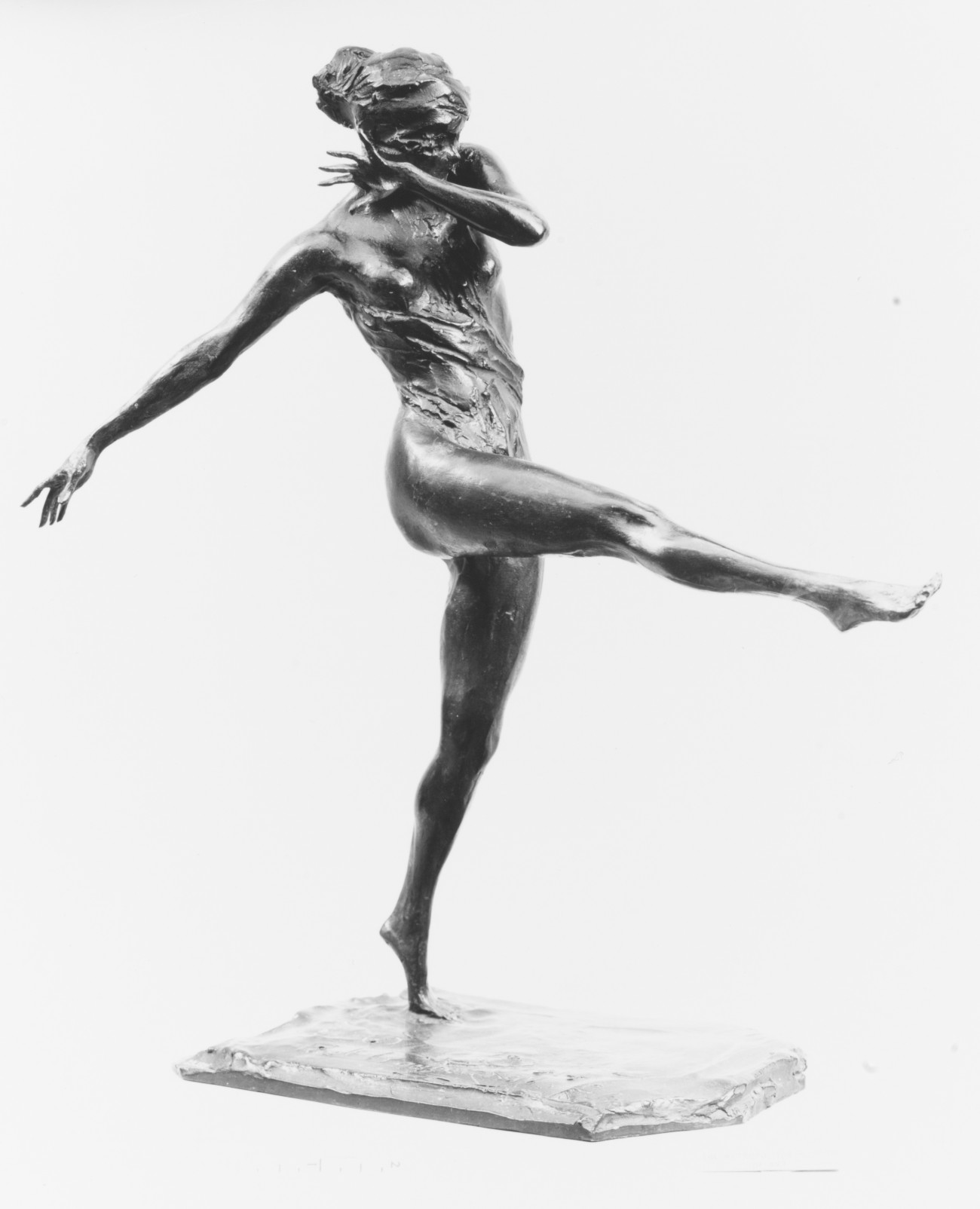
Dancing Girl by Paolo Troubetzkoy, based on Lady Constance Richardson

In 1913 she danced in Judith, a drama based on the Book of Judith, in Vienna. The same year, she published Dancing, Beauty, and Games (1913). In September 1913 she arrived in New York to accompany the French actress Polaire on her American tour.

Her husband, an officer in the Black Watch, was killed in 1914 at the First Battle of Ypres. She went on to marry (in 1921 in London) Mr Dennis Leckie Matthew, an ex-guards officer who had spent several years in Chile pre-1914 observing German activities in South America for the British Government. He acted as a King's Messenger. They had a daughter, Anita, who was brought up (when both parents died in the early 1930s) by her Scottish half-family.

Lady Constance Matthew died in London on 24 November 1932.

== Publications ==
- Dancing, beauty, and games. London: Humphreys. 1913.
