= George Sutherland-Leveson-Gower =

George Sutherland-Leveson-Gower may refer to:

- George Sutherland-Leveson-Gower, 2nd Duke of Sutherland (1786–1861), British peer
- George Sutherland-Leveson-Gower, 3rd Duke of Sutherland (1828–1892), British peer
- George Sutherland-Leveson-Gower, 5th Duke of Sutherland (1888–1963), British peer
