= George Sutherland-Leveson-Gower, 2nd Duke of Sutherland =

English peer, MP and cricketer

His Grace The Duke of Sutherland KG
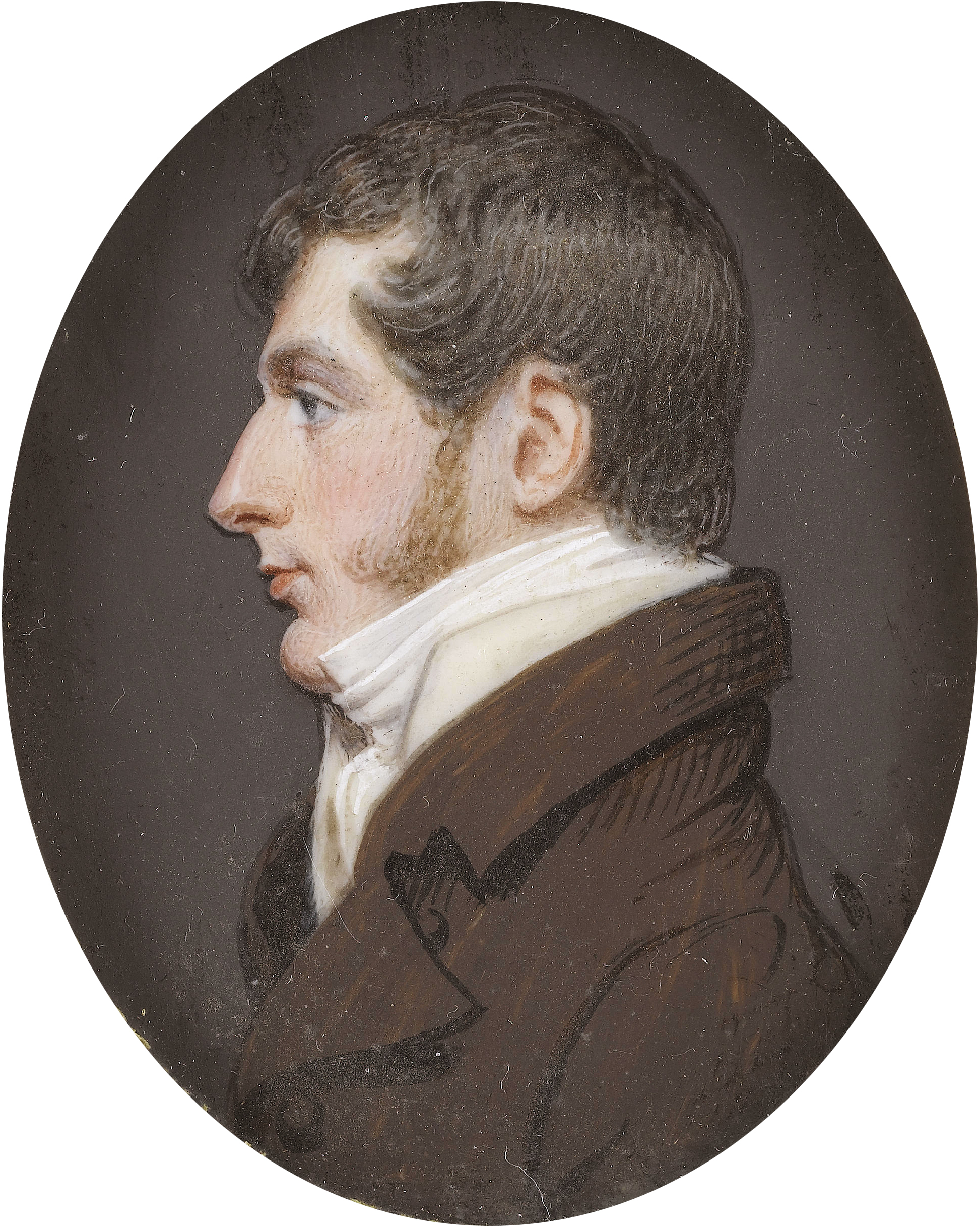
- The 2nd Duke of Sutherland, c. 1810

Member of Parliament for Staffordshire
- In office 1815–1820
- Preceded by: Lord Granville Leveson-Gower; Edward Littleton
- Succeeded by: Sir John Boughey, Bt; Edward Littleton

Member of Parliament for Newcastle-under-Lyme
- In office 1812–1815
- Preceded by: James Macdonald; Edward Bootle-Wilbraham
- Succeeded by: Sir John Chetwode, Bt; Sir John Boughey, Bt

Member of Parliament for St Mawes
- In office 1808–1812
- Preceded by: Scrope Bernard; Viscount Ebrington
- Succeeded by: William Shipley; Scrope Bernard-Morland

Personal details
- Born: George Granville Leveson-Gower; 8 August 1786 Portland Place, London, England
- Died: 27 February 1861 (aged 74) Trentham Hall, Staffordshire, England
- Spouse: Lady Harriet Howard (m. 1823)
- Children: 11, including George
- Parent(s): George Leveson-Gower, 1st Duke of Sutherland; Elizabeth Sutherland, 19th Countess of Sutherland
- Education: Harrow School
- Alma mater: Christ Church, Oxford

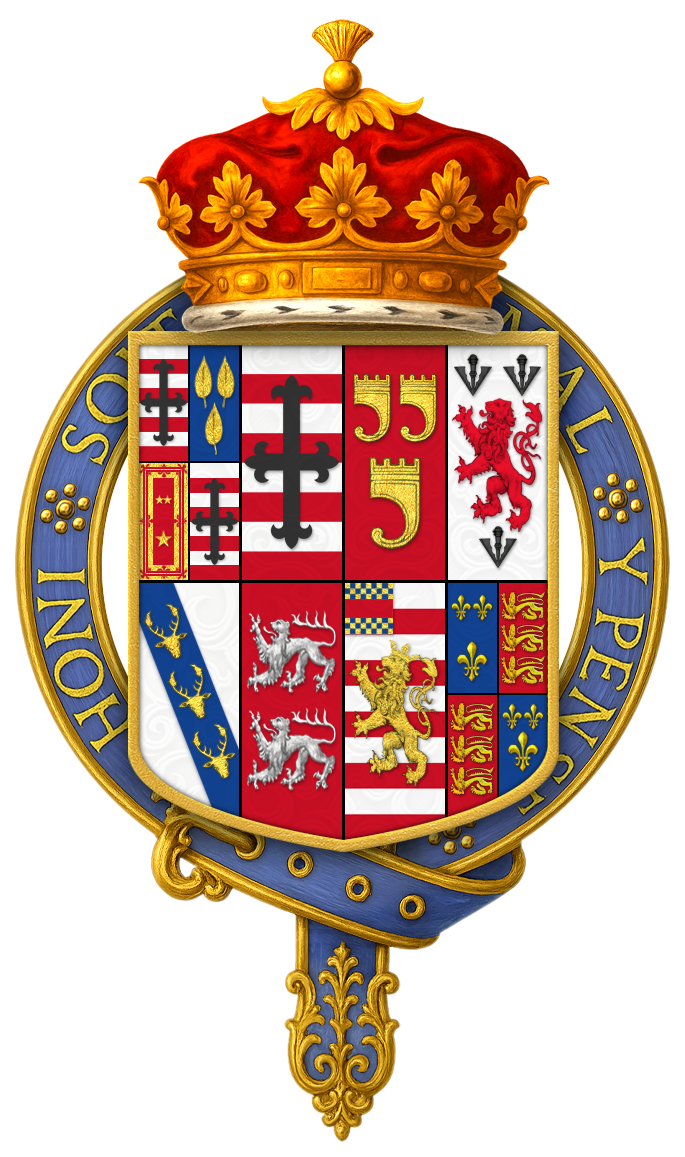
Quartered arms of George Sutherland-Leveson-Gower, 2nd Duke of Sutherland, KG

George Granville Sutherland-Leveson-Gower, 2nd Duke of Sutherland, KG (8 August 1786 – 27 February 1861), styled Viscount Trentham until 1803, Earl Gower between 1803 and 1833 and Marquess of Stafford in 1833, was a British peer and Whig politician from the Leveson-Gower family.

== Early life ==
George Sutherland-Leveson-Gower was born at Portland Place, London, on 8 August 1786, and baptised at St Marylebone Parish Church. He was the eldest son of George Leveson-Gower, 1st Duke of Sutherland, and his wife Elizabeth Sutherland, suo jure Countess of Sutherland.

He was educated at Harrow School from 1798 to 1803, then entered Christ Church, Oxford, where he graduated B.A. in 1806 and M.A. in 1810. In 1841 he graduated D.C.L. at the same university.

Between 1806 and 1808, Earl Gower travelled in Prussia and Russia. During the Prussian campaign against Napoleon's French forces, he spent time at the Prussians' general headquarters. In 1809 he was commissioned as commanding officer of the Sutherland Local Militia.

== Career ==
After returning from Europe, Earl Gower entered the Commons as MP for the Cornwall rotten borough of St Mawes in 1808. In 1812, he transferred to sit for the Staffordshire borough of Newcastle-Under-Lyme, until 1815, when he stood to become one of the county MPs for Staffordshire, sitting until 1820.

He was also Lord Lieutenant for the County of Sutherland from 1831 until his death, was appointed High Steward of the Borough of Stafford in 1833, and was Lord Lieutenant of Shropshire from 1839 to 1845. He was appointed Knight of the Order of the Garter (KG) in 1841.

=== Cricket ===
Sutherland was an active cricketer in 1816 when he played for Marylebone Cricket Club and a team organised by E. H. Budd in a total of three matches.

=== Peerage ===
His father died in 1833, only six months after being created Duke of Sutherland by William IV for his support for the Reform Act 1832, and so this new title devolved on his eldest son. His mother, who was 19th Countess of Sutherland in her own right, died in 1839, and so her ancient Scottish title passed to George, who also became 20th Earl of Sutherland. As a result, the two titles were united in the same person until 1963. It was the 2nd Duke who assumed the additional surname of Sutherland, so that his family name became Sutherland-Leveson-Gower.

== Personal life ==
On 28 May 1823, Sutherland was married to Lady Harriet Elizabeth Georgiana Howard (1806–1868). Lady Harriet was his first cousin once removed and a daughter of George Howard, 6th Earl of Carlisle. Together, they were the parents of eleven children, seven daughters and four sons:

- Lady Elizabeth Georgiana Sutherland-Leveson-Gower (1824–1878), who married George Douglas Campbell, 8th Duke of Argyll, and had issue.
- Lady Evelyn Sutherland-Leveson-Gower (1825–1869), who married Charles Stuart, 12th Lord Blantyre.
- Lady Caroline Sutherland-Leveson-Gower (1827–1887), who married Charles FitzGerald, 4th Duke of Leinster, and had issue.
- George Sutherland-Leveson-Gower, 3rd Duke of Sutherland (1828–1892), who married Anne Hay-Mackenzie.
- Lady Blanche Julia Sutherland-Leveson-Gower (1830–1832), who died in infancy.
- Lord Frederick George Sutherland-Leveson-Gower (1832–1854), who died unmarried.
- Lady Constance Gertrude Sutherland-Leveson-Gower (1834–1880), who married Hugh Grosvenor, 1st Duke of Westminster, and had issue.
- Lady Victoria Sutherland-Leveson-Gower (1838–1839), who died in infancy.
- Lord Albert Sutherland-Leveson-Gower (1843–1874), who married Grace Abdy, daughter of Sir Thomas Neville Abdy, 1st Baronet, and had issue, including Frederick Leveson-Gower.
- Lord Ronald Charles Sutherland-Leveson-Gower (1845–1916), who died unmarried.
- Lady Alexandrina Sutherland-Leveson-Gower (1848–1849), who died in infancy.

He was a keen book collector and was one of the founder members of the Roxburghe Club in 1812. He was a trustee of the National Gallery from 1835 and of the British Museum from 1841 to his death, as well as appointed a Fine Arts Commissioner in 1841.

The Duke died, aged 75, at Trentham Hall in Staffordshire, one of his English mansions, after a period of illness.

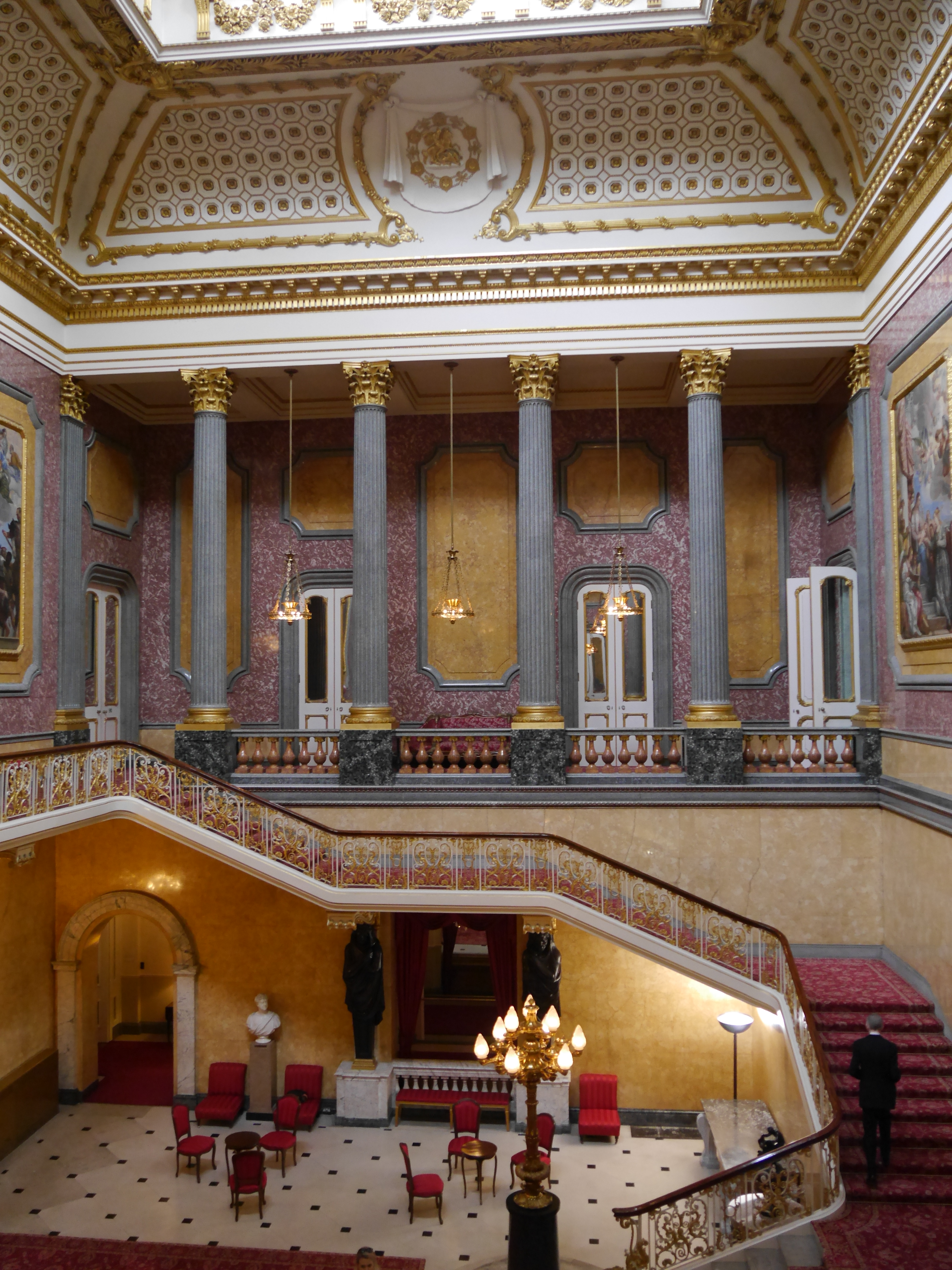
Stafford House (now renamed as Lancaster House)

=== Building projects ===
Sutherland was partially deaf and therefore decided not to play a very active part in politics which was the path well-worn by his contemporary peers. Instead, he expended his energies by spending some of the vast wealth which he inherited from his father on improving his homes. In 1845, he employed Sir Charles Barry to make vast alterations to Dunrobin Castle. Barry transformed the castle into the 189-room ducal palace which exists presently. In addition to Dunrobin, the Duke also had Barry completely remodel his Staffordshire seat of Trentham Hall, Cliveden House in Buckinghamshire, and the family's London townhouse, Stafford House, which was the most valuable private home in the whole of London. Queen Victoria is said to have remarked on arriving at Stafford House, "I have come from my House to your Palace."

=== Descendants ===
A very large proportion of today's British aristocracy are descended from the 2nd Duke of Sutherland. Through the marriages of his daughters, he is the ancestor of the present Dukes of Hamilton, Argyll, Roxburghe, Northumberland, Leinster, and Westminster, the present Marquesses of Hertford and Londonderry, the present earls of Selkirk, Lichfield and Cromartie, and the present Viscount Dilhorne, among many others. His male line died out on the death of his great-grandson, the 5th Duke, in 1963, and the title passed to John Egerton, a descendant of the 2nd Duke's brother Francis. The late Countess of Sutherland was also a descendant of the 2nd Duke. He was also the ancestor of the late Duchess of Beaufort, but not of the present Duke of Beaufort.

Parliament of the United Kingdom
Preceded by Scrope Bernard; Viscount Ebrington	Member of Parliament for St Mawes; 1808–1812; With: Viscount Ebrington 1808–1809; Scrope Bernard 1809–1812	Succeeded by William Shipley; Scrope Bernard-Morland
Preceded by James Macdonald; Edward Bootle-Wilbraham	Member of Parliament for Newcastle-under-Lyme; 1812–1815; With: Sir John Boughey, Bt	Succeeded by Sir John Chetwode, Bt; Sir John Boughey, Bt
Preceded by Lord Granville Leveson-Gower; Edward Littleton	Member of Parliament for Staffordshire; 1815–1820; With: Edward Littleton	Succeeded by Sir John Boughey, Bt; Edward Littleton
Honorary titles
Preceded by The Marquess of Stafford	Lord Lieutenant of Sutherland; 1830–1861	Succeeded by The Duke of Sutherland
Preceded by The Earl of Powis	Lord Lieutenant of Shropshire; 1839–1845	Succeeded by The Viscount Hill
Peerage of the United Kingdom
Preceded by George Leveson-Gower	Duke of Sutherland; 1833–1861	Succeeded by George Sutherland-Leveson-Gower
Peerage of Scotland
Preceded by Elizabeth Leveson-Gower	Earl of Sutherland; 1839–1861	Succeeded by George Sutherland-Leveson-Gower
Peerage of England
Preceded by George Leveson-Gower	Baron Gower (descended by acceleration); 1826–1861	Succeeded by George Sutherland-Leveson-Gower
