= Lord Lieutenant of Sutherland =

Ceremonial officer in Sutherland, Scotland

The Lord Lieutenant of Sutherland is the British monarch's personal representative in an area which has been defined since 1975 as consisting of the local government district of Sutherland in Scotland, and this definition was renewed by the Lord-Lieutenants (Scotland) Order 1996. Previously, the area of the lieutenancy was the county of Sutherland, which was abolished as a local government area by the Local Government (Scotland) Act 1973. The district was created, under the 1973 act as a district of the two-tier Highland region and abolished as a local government area under the Local Government (Scotland) Act 1994, which turned the Highland region into a unitary council area.

== List of Lords Lieutenant of Sutherland ==
- George Leveson-Gower, 2nd Marquess of Stafford 17 March 1794 – 1830
- George Sutherland-Leveson-Gower, 2nd Duke of Sutherland 31 July 1830 – 28 February 1861
- George Sutherland-Leveson-Gower, 3rd Duke of Sutherland 30 April 1861 – 22 September 1892
- Cromartie Sutherland-Leveson-Gower, 4th Duke of Sutherland 5 November 1892 – 27 June 1913
- George Sutherland-Leveson-Gower, 5th Duke of Sutherland 9 September 1913 – 29 November 1944
- Brig-Gen. George Paynter 6 March 1945 – 15 August 1950
- Brig. George Rawstorne 17 November 1950 – 15 July 1962
- James Thompson, Lord Migdale 22 November 1962 – 1972
- Sir Allan Gilmour 8 October 1972 – 1991
- Major-General David Houston 27 January 1992 – 2005
- Monica Main 20 August 2005 – 2022
- Major General Patrick Marriott 1 August 2022 – to date

== Deputy lieutenant of Sutherland ==
A deputy lieutenant of Sutherland is commissioned by the Lord Lieutenant of Sutherland. Deputy lieutenants support the work of the lord-lieutenant. There can be several deputy lieutenants at any time, depending on the population of the county. Their appointment does not terminate with the changing of the lord-lieutenant, but they usually retire at age 75.

=== 20th Century ===
- 12 January 1900: Eric Chaplin
- 12 January 1900: William Ewing Gilmour
- 12 January 1900: Major Duncan Matheson
