= Strathpeffer Pavilion =

Coordinates: 57.5874°N 4.5376°W

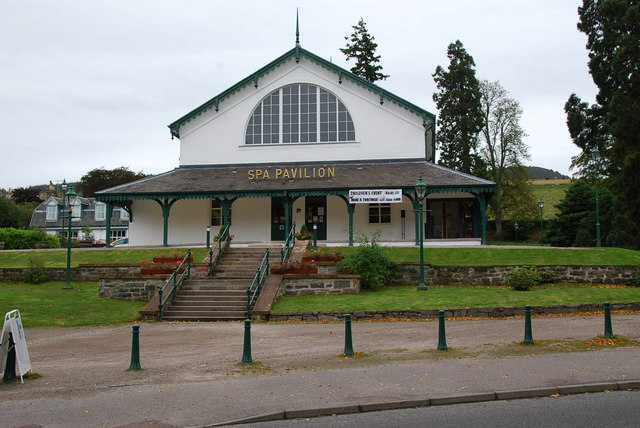
Strathpeffer Pavilion

Strathpeffer Spa Pavilion (grid reference NH485583) was commissioned by the Countess of Cromartie in the late 19th century, to serve as a social and entertainment centre for Strathpeffer's many visitors. Formerly just a collection of farms in a Scottish Highland Strath, the village of Strathpeffer developed and became a popular health resort (then the most northerly spa in Europe) in the Victorian era, when local spring waters were discovered to have health-giving properties.

Opened by the Countess of Cromartie in 1881, the Pavilion provided entertainment in the form of dances, concerts, lectures etc. Famous speakers included suffragette Emmeline Pankhurst and explorer Ernest Shackleton.

During the First World War (1914–18), many of the large houses and hotels in Strathpeffer were requisitioned by the armed forces and the Pavilion was taken over by the US Navy and used as a hospital.

After the War, the popularity of the spa declined and the Pavilion was used only as an occasional venue for events, until it was acquired by Harry McGhee's Highland Lass Estates and was completely restored and refurbished, re-opening in 1960 as a licensed dance hall and concert venue, becoming hugely popular, with people coming to the dances from all over the Highlands. The venue was even visited by the Beatles in January 1963 but, contrary to popular lore, they never actually performed at the Pavilion.

Thereafter, the building was acquired by a large hotel group and was allowed to fall into disrepair, being used only occasionally for concerts and other events. Eventually, it was acquired by The Highland Council, who passed it on to the Scottish Historic Buildings Trust (SHBT). SHBT then masterminded a huge fund-raising and restoration project, with a view to restoring the much-altered building to its original Victorian splendour, with the addition of requisite modern facilities.

The restoration was carried out in 2003-2004 by architects LDN and the Pavilion re-opened in autumn 2004. It was then a multi-purpose venue for the performing arts, dances, conferences, weddings and a variety of exhibitions, festivals and other events.

The Pavilion returned to community ownership in 2019.
