= George Rawstorne =

English cricketer and soldier

Brigadier George Streynsham Rawstorne CBE, MC (22 January 1895 – 15 July 1962) was an English soldier and cricketer. He was born in Croston, near Chorley, Lancashire and died at Rovie, Rogart, Sutherland.

The son of a bishop, Rawstorne was educated at Eton College and was in the cricket team for three years to 1914; he was captain in his last year. He also made a single appearance for the Lancashire Second XI in 1913. Rawstorne made his first and only first-class appearance in 1919, in Lancashire's first County Championship fixture for nearly five years. Batting in the middle order, he scored 2 runs in the only innings in which he batted, as Lancashire ran out victors by a ten-wicket margin.

During World War II, Rawstorne commanded the 15th Brigade in North Africa and Sicily. From 1945 until his retirement in 1947, he was the commanding officer of Inverness sub-district. From 1950 until his death, he served as Lord Lieutenant of Sutherland.

Honorary titles
Preceded by Sir George Paynter	Lord Lieutenant of Sutherland; 1950–1962	Succeeded by Lord Migdale
