= Janet Blunt =

British folklorist

Janet Heatley Blunt (1859–1950) was a British folklorist.

Daughter of the British general Charles Harris Blunt, she spent her first thirty years in India. She then moved to Adderbury in Oxfordshire where she became interested in local folk traditions. Her primary contribution to folklore is her preservation of the Adderbury traditions of folk song and dance, particularly Morris dancing. Morris dance was common in the area in the early 19th century but had disappeared by the late 1880s. It was revived in 1974 from the extensive notes made by Janet Blunt and Cecil Sharp in 1916 and 1918.

The village of Adderbury commemorates Janet Blunt every year as part of its annual Morris festivities, and a blue plaque was installed at Le Hall Place in Adderbury in 2009.

== Bibliography ==
- Foxworthy, Tony. Forty Long Miles: Twenty-Three English Folk Songs from the Collection of Janet Heatley Blunt. London: Galliard-EFDSS, 1976.
- Pickering, Michael. Village Song & Culture: A Study Based on the Blunt Collection of Song from Adderbury, North Oxfordshire. London: Croom Helm, 1982.
