= Dedworth =

Area of Windsor, Berkshire, England

Coordinates: 51°28′37″N 0°38′53″W

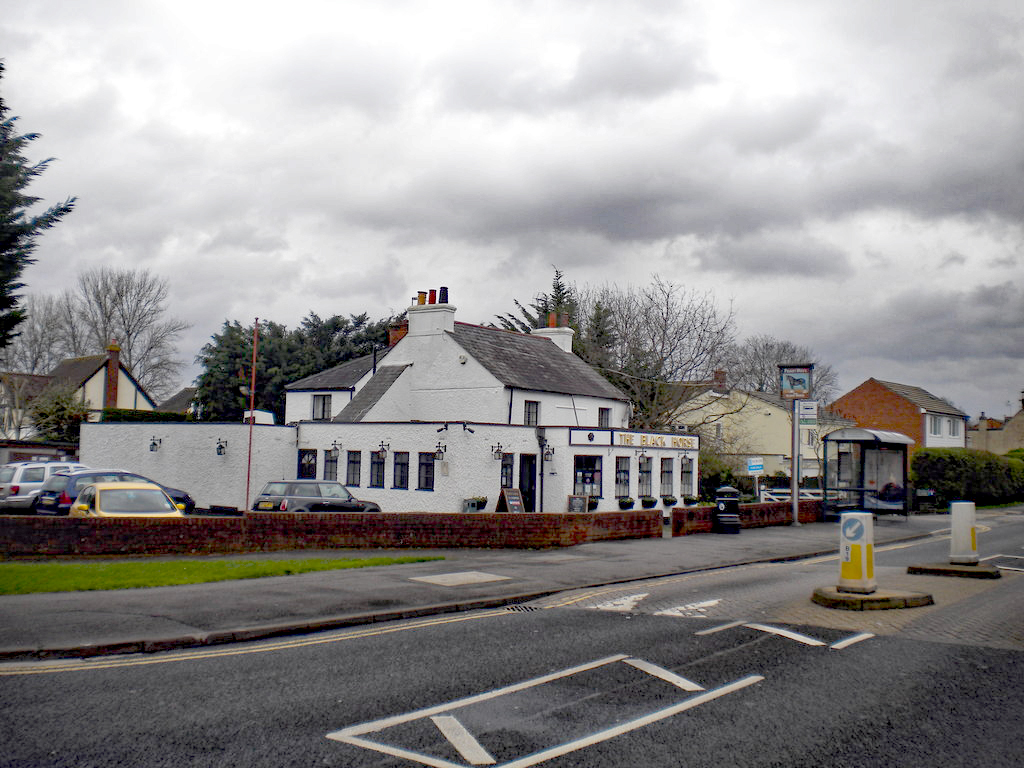
- The Black Horse, Dedworth

- Location within Berkshire
- OS grid reference: SU940762
- Unitary authority: Windsor and Maidenhead
- Ceremonial county: Berkshire
- Region: South East
- Country: England
- Sovereign state: United Kingdom
- Post town: Windsor
- Postcode district: SL4
- Dialling code: 01628

Dedworth is the most westerly area of Windsor in Berkshire, England. It lies between the settlements of Oakley Green and Clewer.

== Toponymy ==
The name Dedworth is formed from the words 'Dydda', a man's name, and 'Worth', a Saxon word for enclosure.

== History ==
An irregular quadrangular moat in Wolf Lane may be all that remains of the manor house of Dedworth Maunsell. The other manor in the area was Dedworth Loring, owned by the De Loring family from the time of Peter De Loring, in the early 13th century. It was possibly located to the north, where a large medieval hearth has been uncovered in the aptly named Knight's Close. Dedworth was one of three Saxon villages (the other two being Clewer and Losfield) that Windsor expanded to encompass. Dedworth predates Windsor and is mentioned in the Domesday Book as Dideorde.

== Geography ==
Dedworth is mostly a housing estate made up of 1950-1980s style semi-detached houses. Dedworth has a local nature reserve called Sutherland Grange. The parish church of All Saints is the work of G. F. Bodley (1863). It has stained glass windows by Edward Burne-Jones, William Morris, Ford Madox Brown and D. G. Rossetti (1863–87). Dedworth has a number of shops: The Co-operative, Boots Pharmacy, Tesco, Model Shop and many others.
