= Sir John Boughey, 2nd Baronet =

Sir John Boughey, 2nd Baronet (1 May 1784 – 27 June 1823), of Betley Court, Staffordshire, was an English Member of Parliament for Newcastle-under-Lyme (UK Parliament constituency) in 1812–1818 and Staffordshire (UK Parliament constituency) in 1820 – 27 June 1823.

He was Captain-Commandant of the Betley and Audley Volunteers and was later commissioned as Lieutenant-Colonel Commandant of the Southern Regiment, Staffordshire Local Militia.

In December 1822, shortly before his death, he was admitted a Fellow of the Royal Society

Baronetage of Great Britain
Preceded by Thomas Fletcher	Baronet (of Newcastle-under-Lyme); 1812–1823	Succeeded by Thomas Fletcher Fenton Boughey
