= Stewart-Richardson baronets =

Baronetcy in the Baronetage of Nova Scotia

The Richardson, later Stewart-Richardson Baronetcy, of Pencaitland in the County of Haddington, is a title in the Baronetage of Nova Scotia. It was created on 13 November 1630 for Robert Richardson, with remainder to his heirs male whatsoever. The title was dormant from c. 1640–c. 1678, 1752–c. 1783 and 1821–1837. The thirteenth Baronet was the son of Elizabeth, eldest daughter and co-heir of James Stewart, and assumed the additional surname of Stewart.

== Richardson, later Stewart-Richardson baronets, of Pencaitland (1630) ==
- Sir Robert Richardson, 1st Baronet (died 1635)
- Sir Robert Richardson, 2nd Baronet (1613–c. 1640)
- Sir James Richardson, 3rd Baronet (died 1680)
- Sir James Richardson, 4th Baronet (died 1717)
- Sir James Richardson, 5th Baronet (died 1731)
- Sir William Richardson, 6th Baronet (died 1747)
- Sir Robert Richardson, 7th Baronet (died 1752)
- Sir James Richardson, 8th Baronet (died 1788)
- Sir George Richardson, 9th Baronet (died 1791)
- Sir George Preston Richardson, 10th Baronet (c. 1778–1803)
- Sir James Richardson, 11th Baronet (died 1804)
- Sir John Charles Richardson, 12th Baronet (c. 1785–1821)
- Sir John Stewart-Richardson, 13th Baronet (1797–1881)
- Sir James Thomas Stewart-Richardson, 14th Baronet (1840–1895)
- Sir Edward Austin Stewart-Richardson, 15th Baronet (1872–1914) (married Constance Stewart-Richardson, a dancer and niece of the 4th Duke of Sutherland. Died of wounds sustained whilst serving with the Black Watch)
- Sir Ian Rorie Hay Stewart-Richardson, 16th Baronet (1904–1969)
- Sir Simon Alaisdair Stewart-Richardson, 17th Baronet (born 1947)

The heir apparent is the present holder's only son Jason Rorie Stewart-Richardson (born 1990).
