= Sutherland Grange =

Local Nature Reserve in Berkshire, England

Coordinates: 51.485°N 0.649°W

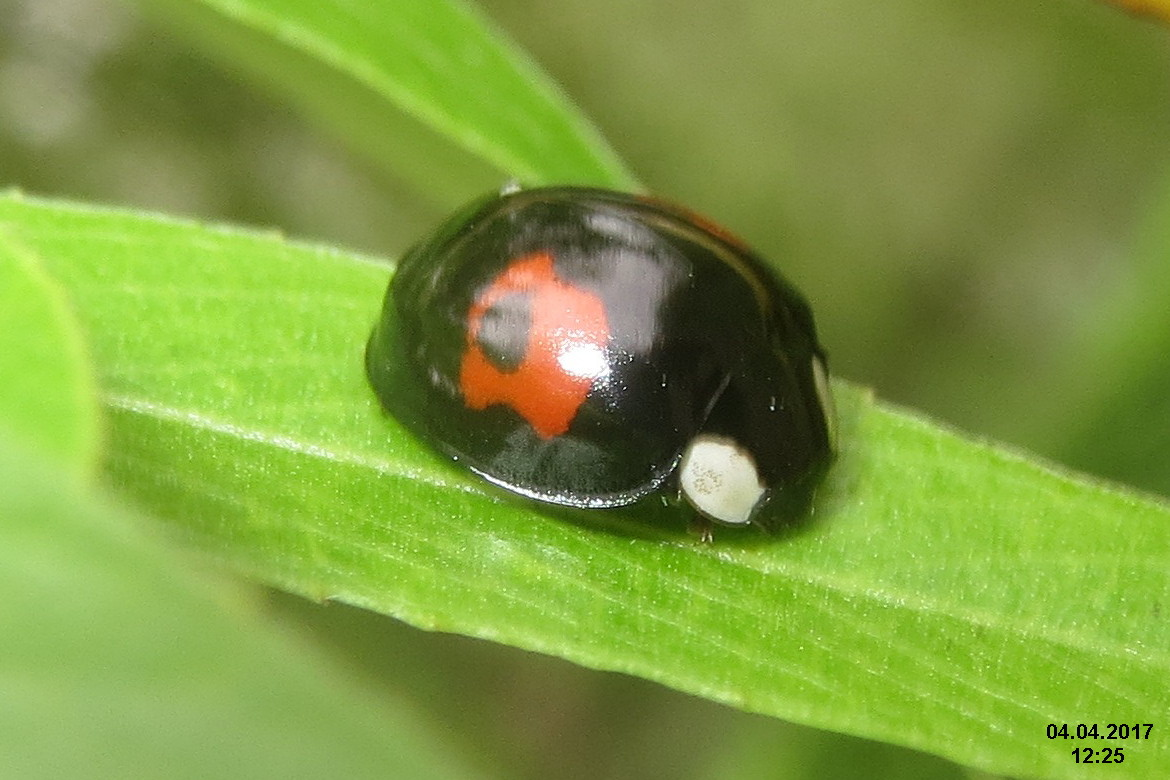
- Harlequin ladybird in Sutherland Grange
- Interactive map of Sutherland Grange
- Type: Local Nature Reserve
- Location: Dedworth, Berkshire
- OS grid: SU 939 771
- Area: 3.2 hectares (7.9 acres)
- Manager: Royal Borough of Windsor and Maidenhead

Sutherland Grange is a 3.2-hectare (7.9-acre) Local Nature Reserve on the northern outskirts of Dedworth, a suburb of Windsor in Berkshire. It is owned and managed by the Royal Borough of Windsor and Maidenhead.

== Geography and site ==
The nature reserve is Meadow land.

== History ==
There is a large late Victorian house on the site, called 'Sutherland Grange' with the original name retained.

In 1999 the site was declared as a local nature reserve by the Royal Borough of Windsor & Maidenhead.
