= Castle Leod =

Tower house in Achterneed, Highland, Scotland

Coordinates: 57°35′55″N 4°32′06″W

Designations

Listed Building – Category A
- Official name: Castle Leod
- Designated: 24 March 1971
- Reference no.: LB7826

Inventory of Gardens and Designed Landscapes in Scotland
- Official name: Castle Leod
- Designated: 30 March 2003
- Reference no.: GDL00094

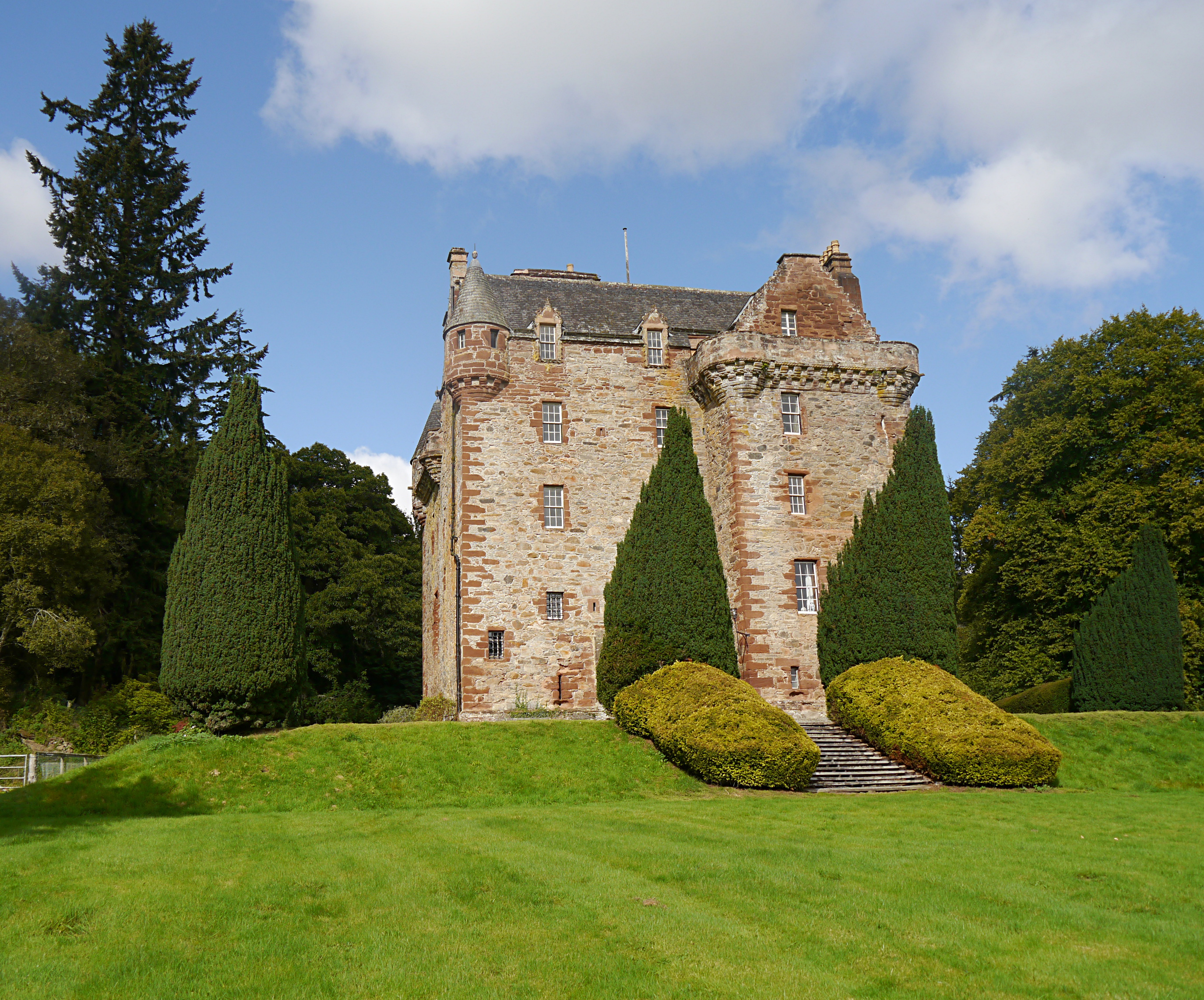
Castle Leod

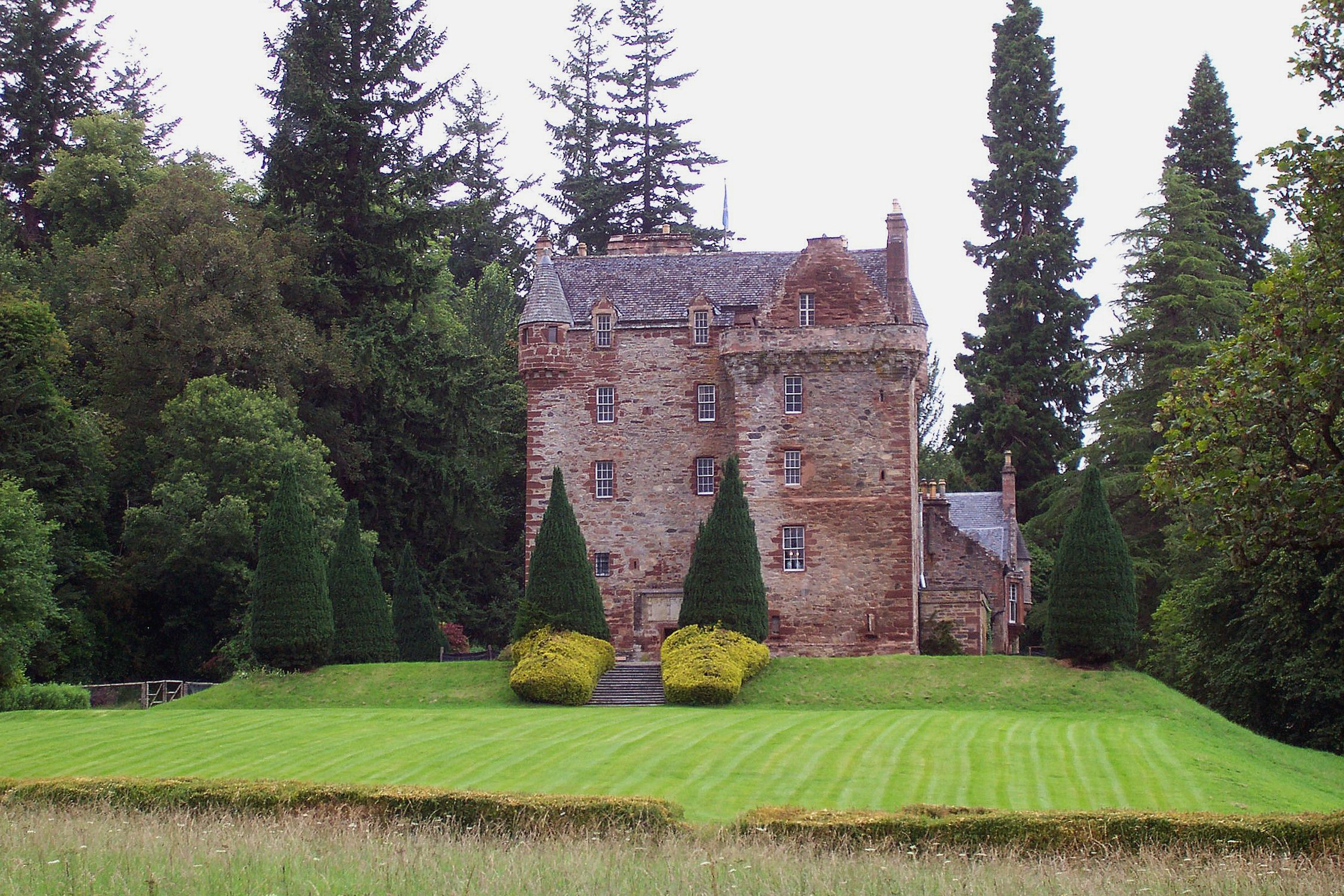
Castle Leod

Castle Leod is the seat of the Clan Mackenzie. It is a category A listed building, and the grounds are listed in the Inventory of Gardens and Designed Landscapes of Scotland, the national listing of significant gardens. It is located near Strathpeffer in the east of Ross-shire in the Scottish Highlands.

== History ==
=== Background ===
The castle was granted to John of Killin, 10th Chief of Clan MacKenzie after he fought at the Battle of Flodden in 1513. The castle was passed to his great-grandson Kenneth Mackenzie, 1st Lord Mackenzie of Kintail, who granted it in 1608 to his brother Sir Roderick "Rorie" Mackenzie. In 1605 Sir Roderick married Margaret MacLeod, heiress of Torquil MacLeod of Lewis, bringing her immense wealth into the family and also settling the feud between the MacLeods and the Mackenzies over the Barony of Coigach, which thus passed into the Mackenzie family.

=== Castle history ===
The castle is believed to have been built on the site of a very ancient Pictish fort from before the 12th century. The current castle is the result of work carried out in the early 17th century by Sir Roderick Mackenzie, the ancestor of the Earl of Cromartie. The castle has remained the seat of the Earls of Cromartie ever since.

In 1746 George Mackenzie, 3rd Earl of Cromartie, forfeited the estate, following his support for the ill-fated 1745 Jacobite Uprising. The estates, but not the title, were restored to his son in 1784. The castle was reported to already be in a run-down state earlier in the same century, when the estate was badly debt-ridden. By 1814 it was described as "Quite a ruin... deserted except by crows", though this may have applied more to the upper floors.

In the mid 19th century, Castle Leod was completely renovated by the Hay-Mackenzies. Descendants of the 3rd Earl, the Hay-Mackenzies were restored to the earldom of Cromartie after Anne Hay-Mackenzie married George Sutherland-Leveson-Gower, 3rd Duke of Sutherland, and in 1861 was created first Countess of Cromartie, the earldom last held by her great-great-grandfather, the 3rd Earl, with a special remainder to her second son, Francis Mackenzie, 2nd Earl of Cromartie. She was also created Baroness Macleod, of Castle Leod.

In 1851 large extensions were added to the north of the castle, which were rebuilt in 1904. The roof was made watertight as recently as 1992. The castle remains the home of the Earl of Cromartie, and is open to the public on a limited number of days.

== The castle ==
A compact L-Plan tower house, built of red sandstone, forms the earliest part of the castle, and may be based on a 15th-century building. An additional section was later added in the re-entrant angle, making the castle square in plan, and accommodating a larger staircase and extra bedrooms. The date 1616 is carved on a dormer window, but it is not known if this date refers to the original phase or the extension. The addition was built over the parapet of the original front, and is more decorative in style.

In some parts the walls of the castle are 6 to 8 feet (1.8 to 2.4 m) thick. Other defensive measures include the iron grilles which remain on some lower windows, and numerous splayed gun loops and arrow-slit windows. The rooms, some wood-panelled, are decorated with many Mackenzie portraits from past centuries, as well as antique furnishings and large-scale antique maps. Many original fittings are to be found around the castle. The grounds include two Spanish chestnuts, said to have been planted by John of Killin in 1556, to mark the confirmation of his acquisition of Castle Leod by Mary Queen of Scots.

== Outlander (TV Series) ==
Castle Leod is widely considered to be the inspiration behind Castle Leoch, the seat and home of the laird of Clan Mackenzie, in Diana Gabaldon's Outlander historical fiction series. It was considered as a filming location for the TV series, yet Doune Castle was selected, due to its ease of location. This may be surprising to viewers who know Castle Leod as the seat of the Clan Mackenzie and accurately represents the historical period which Diana Gabaldon seeks to portray.

Diana Gabaldon told STV that "When the TV show began scouting locations, I suggested Leod as a possibility. It's entirely accurate as to period, of course, and has magnificent grounds, with a park of enormous, exotic trees planted by centuries of MacKenzies and their visitors. (Diana herself planted a "very modest" rowan, as her "own wee contribution" to the history).

== See also ==
- Strathpeffer
- Clan Mackenzie
- Clan MacLeod of Lewis
