= George Mackenzie, 3rd Earl of Cromartie =

Scottish nobleman and Jacobite

The Earl of Cromartie
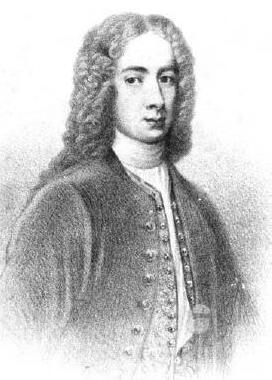
- Preceded by: John Mackenzie, 2nd Earl of Cromartie

Personal details
- Born: 1703
- Died: 28 September 1766 (aged 62–63)
- Spouse: Isabel Gordon

George Mackenzie, 3rd Earl of Cromartie (c. 1703 – 28 September 1766) was a Scottish nobleman.

== Life ==
He succeeded his father John, the 2nd earl, in February 1731. In 1745, he joined Charles Edward Stuart and he served with the Jacobites until April 1746 when he was taken prisoner in Sutherland after the Battle of Littleferry. He was tried and sentenced to death, but he obtained a conditional pardon although his peerage was forfeited, allegedly because his wife was heavily pregnant. He was however reduced to extreme poverty, because the family estates and rights were confiscated in 1748. He died on 28 September 1766 in Soho Square, London, having never gone north of the River Trent again, in keeping with the terms of his pardon.

== Family ==
He married Isabel Gordon, daughter of Sir William Gordon of Invergordon, on 23 September 1724 and had a large family of young children in 1746. His numerous children, three sons, and nine daughters, were:

- John Mackenzie, Lord MacLeod, de jure 4th Earl of Cromartie but for the attainder (d. 1789 without issue), eldest son and heir apparent. He fought alongside his father in the rebellion of 1745. He was also convicted of high treason and sentenced to death, but received a full pardon and was released in 1748, on condition that all estates and rights were forfeit to the Crown. He went to Sweden where he rose to high rank and was created a Count in the Swedish nobility, a title which was recognized by George II. In 1777 he returned to England and petitioned for the restoration of his estates and offered to raise a Highland Regiment for the Government. This became known as 1st Battalion Highland Light Infantry. He later achieved the rank of Major-General in the British Army. In 1780 Lord MacLeod was elected MP for Ross-shire. In 1784 the family estates were restored to him by Act of Parliament for a payment of £19,000, but not the title Earl of Cromartie. In 1787 he took up residence at New Tarbat which he rebuilt. He had the patronage of Kilmuir Easter church. Lord Macleod married in 1786 Marjory, eldest daughter of James, XVIth Lord Forbes, without issue. [She later married John, 4th Duke of Atholl, also without issue]. Lord MacLeod died childless on 2 April 1789, and was succeeded by his cousin Captain Kenneth Mackenzie, a grandson of the 2nd Earl, who also died without heirs male in 1796. The family estates then passed to Lord MacLeod's eldest sister, Lady Elibank in 1796.
- William, who died young.
- George, a Colonel in the 71st Regiment, who died unmarried in 1788.
- Isabella Mackenzie (d. 28 December 1801), who married the elderly George Murray, 6th Lord Elibank (1706–1785), and had two daughters (the younger dying unmarried in 1849). In 1796, Lady Elibank succeeded her cousin Kenneth Mackenzie, de jure 5th Earl of Cromartie (but for the attainder) in the estates. Her great-granddaughter was created Countess of Cromartie, with an unusual remainder, in 1861.
  - Hon Maria Murray, who married 1790 Edward Hay, later Hay-Mackenzie, of Newhall, brother of George Hay, 7th Marquis of Tweeddale, originally members of a junior branch of the family descended from the 2nd Marquess of Tweeddale. The brother succeeded to the marquisate in 1797, and had numerous descendants, still holding the title.
    - John Hay-Mackenzie of Newhall (d. 9 July 1849) who married on 23 April 1828, Anne, daughter of Sir Gibson-Craig, Baronet, and had issue, an only daughter
      - Anne Hay-Mackenzie, 1st Countess of Cromartie (d. 1888) in her own right, who married 27 June 1849 the 3rd Duke of Sutherland as his 1st wife, and was mother of two surviving sons and two daughters. This 21 October 1861 creation is still extant, under an unusual remainder.
- Lady Mary, who married, first, Captain Robert Clarke, London; second, Thomas Drayton, South Carolina; third, John Ainslie, Charlestown; and fourth, Henry Middleton of Charlestown, South Carolina.
- Lady Anne, who married, first, the Hon. Edmond Atkin, of South Carolina and secondly, Dr John Murray of Charlestown.
- Lady Caroline (1736–1791), who married, first, a Mr Drake, of London, and secondly, Walter Hunter of Polmood and Crailieg.
- Lady Jean, who died young
- Lady Amelia, who died young.
- Lady Margaret, who in 1769 married John Glassford of Douglastown, Dumbarton, with issue.
- Lady Augusta, who married Sir William Murray of Auchtertyre, with issue.

== Notes ==
Masonic offices
Preceded by William St Clair	Grand Master of the Grand Lodge of Scotland; 1738–1739	Succeeded by The Earl of Kintore
Peerage of Scotland
Preceded by John Mackenzie	Earl of Cromartie; 1731–1746	Forfeit
