= Earl of Cromartie =

Earldom in the Peerage of the United Kingdom

Earldom of Cromartie
- Earl of Cromartie Coat of Arms. Quarterly: 1st, Or a Mountain Azure in flames proper (Macleod of Lewis);2nd, Azure a Buck's Head cabossed Or (Mackenzie);3rd, Gules three Legs of a Man armed proper conjoined in the centre at the upper part of two of the thighs flexed in triangle garnished and spurred Or (Isle of Man);4th, Argent on a Pale Sable an Imperial Crown proper all within a Double Tressure flory counterflory Gules (Erskine of Innerteall)
- Creation date: 21 October 1861
- Creation: Second
- Created by: Queen Victoria
- Peerage: Peerage of the United Kingdom
- First holder: Anne Sutherland-Leveson-Gower, Duchess of Sutherland
- Present holder: John Mackenzie, 5th Earl of Cromartie
- Heir apparent: Colin Mackenzie, Viscount Tarbat
- Remainder to: By special remainder (see below)
- Subsidiary titles: Viscount Tarbat; Baron Castlehaven; Baron MacLeod
- Status: Extant
- Seat: Castle Leod
- Motto: Luceo Non Uro ("I shine but do not burn")

Earl of Cromartie ( /ˈkrɒmərti/) is a title that has been created twice, both for members of the Mackenzie family. It was first created as Earl of Cromarty in the Peerage of Scotland in 1703 for Sir George Mackenzie, 2nd Baronet, but his titles were forfeited after the Jacobite rising of 1745. It was recreated in 1861 in the Peerage of the United Kingdom for Anne Sutherland-Leveson-Gower, Duchess of Sutherland (née Hay-Mackenzie). Since 1979, the Earl of Cromartie has been chief of Clan Mackenzie.

== History ==
=== First creation ===
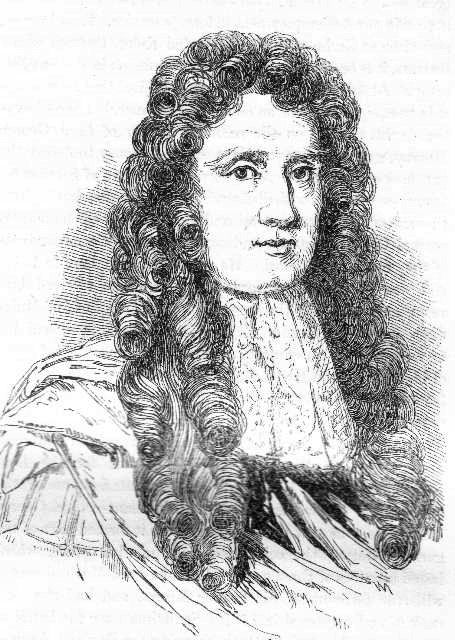
1st Earl of Cromartie

This branch of the family descends from Sir Roderick Mackenzie, whose elder brother Kenneth Mackenzie was created Lord Mackenzie of Kintail in 1609 and was the father of Colin Mackenzie, 1st Earl of Seaforth (see the Earl of Seaforth for further history of this branch of the family). Sir Roderick's son, John Mackenzie, was in 1628 created a baronet, of Tarbat in the County of Ross, in the Baronetage of Nova Scotia, with remainder to his heirs male whatsoever. He was succeeded by his son, Sir George Mackenzie, 2nd Baronet. He was a prominent statesman and judge and served as Lord Justice General from 1678 to 1680 and from 1704 to 1710 and as Secretary of State from 1702 to 1704. In 1685, he was raised to the Peerage of Scotland as Lord MacLeod and Castlehaven and Viscount of Tarbat. In 1703 he was further honoured when he was made Lord MacLeod and Castlehaven, Viscount of Tarbat and Earl of Cromarty. In 1704, Lord Cromartie resigned his baronetcy in favour of his second son the Hon. Kenneth Mackenzie (died 1728), who was created a baronet, of Cromarty and Grandvale (see Mackenzie baronets).

He was succeeded in the peerages by his eldest son, the second Earl. On his death, the titles passed to his eldest surviving son, the third Earl. He supported the Jacobite rising of 1745 and led a force of 400 men from Clan Mackenzie at the Battle of Falkirk in 1746. Lord Cromartie was captured by government forces the same year and pleaded guilty to high treason before the House of Lords. He was sentenced to death but received a conditional pardon on 22 January 1748, on the condition that within six months he surrender all the rights of his estates as lord and forfeit his titles, which he did. His eldest son and heir apparent, John Mackenzie, Lord MacLeod, fought alongside his father in the rebellion of 1745. He was also convicted of high treason and sentenced to death, but received a full pardon in 1748. He later had a successful career in both the British and Swedish armies. He achieved the rank of Major-General in the British Army, and was created a Count in the Swedish nobility, a title which was recognized by George II. In 1784, the Cromartie estates were restored to him by Act of Parliament for a payment of £19,000 (equivalent to £2,444,000 in 2025). Lord MacLeod died childless in 1789, and in his will he created an entail as to his heirs.

The Mackenzie estates were inherited first by his cousin Kenneth, nephew of the third earl, and then to Lady Isabella Mackenzie, eldest daughter of the attainted third Earl, married George Murray, 6th Lord Elibank. Their eldest daughter, the Hon. Maria Murray, married Edward Hay, younger brother of George Hay, 7th Marquess of Tweeddale. Edward assumed the additional surname of Mackenzie as required by the entail of Lord McLeod. Their eldest son John Hay-Mackenzie passed the estates to his only child Anne Hay-Mackenzie, who in 1849 married George, Marquess of Stafford, future Duke of Sutherland.

=== Second creation ===
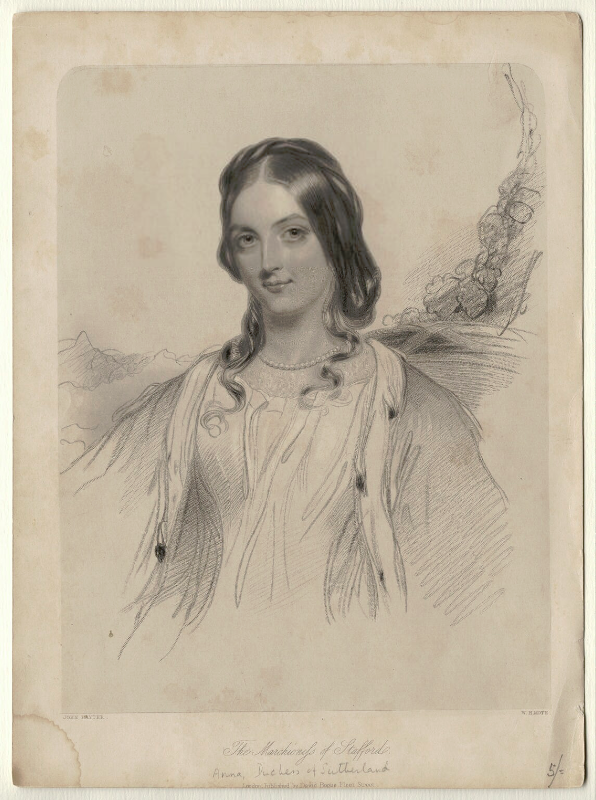
Anne, 1st Countess of Cromartie

In 1861, the titles held by Anne's ancestors were recreated when she was raised to the Peerage of the United Kingdom in her own right as Baroness MacLeod, of Castle Leod in the County of Cromartie, Baroness Castlehaven, of Castlehaven in the County of Cromartie, Viscountess Tarbat, of Tarbat in the County of Cromartie, and Countess of Cromartie.

As her children were already in remainder to the peerages of the Sutherland-Leveson-Gower family, the Cromartie titles were created with special remainder to keep them separate and in line with the Peerage of Scotland, in which females are able to inherit titles.

1. to her second surviving son Lord Francis Leveson-Gower, and the heirs male of his body (however, he had no sons);
2. to each of her younger sons and the heirs male of their bodies (however, she had no further sons);
3. to the said Lord Francis Leveson-Gower and the heirs of his body (meaning that the titles could descend through female lines if there are no male-line heirs);
4. to each of her younger sons in priority of birth and the heirs of their bodies;
5. to her daughter Lady Florence and the heirs of her body; and
6. to each of her daughters in priority of birth and the heirs of their bodies.

Lady Cromartie was succeeded according to the special remainder by her second surviving son, Lord Francis, the second Earl. As Viscount Tarbat he had been sub-lieutenant in the Shropshire Yeomanry in 1876 and was later a Major in the 2nd Volunteer Battalion of the Seaforth Highlanders and served as a Vice-Lord-Lieutenant and Deputy Lieutenant of Ross and Cromarty. Lord Cromartie had no sons and on his death in 1893 the titles fell into abeyance between his two surviving daughters, Lady Sibell Lilian and Lady Constance (by regulation 3. of the remainder). The abeyance was terminated in 1895 in favour of the elder daughter, Sibell Lilian, who became the third Countess. In 1899, she married Edward Walter Blunt (1869–1949), son of Major-General Charles Harris Blunt, great-grandson of Sir Henry Blunt, 2nd Baronet (see Blunt baronets). He assumed the additional surname of Mackenzie in 1905. However, Lady Cromartie later discontinued the use of the surname Blunt. She was succeeded by her eldest son, the fourth Earl. He was also a Major in the Seaforth Highlanders and fought in the Second World War. From 1940 to 1945, he was a Prisoner of War. Lord Cromartie was also a member of the Ross and Cromarty County Council. In 1979, he discontinued the use of the surname Blunt for himself and his son and was recognized by the Lord Lyon as Cabarfeidh (Chief) of Clan Mackenzie. Since 1989, the titles have been held by his only son, the fifth Earl. As a male-line descendant of Sir Henry Blunt, 2nd Baronet, he is also in remainder to this title. He is also in remainder to the earldom of Sutherland, which can descend through female lines, but not to the dukedom of Sutherland and the subsidiary titles presently attached to it, as these can only descend through male lines.

The family seat is Castle Leod, near Dingwall in Ross-shire.

== Mackenzie baronets, of Tarbat (1628) ==
- Sir John Mackenzie, 1st Baronet (d. 1654)
- Sir George Mackenzie, 2nd Baronet (1630–1714) (created Earl of Cromartie in 1703)

== Earls of Cromartie (1703) ==
- George Mackenzie, 1st Earl of Cromartie (1630–1714)
- John Mackenzie, 2nd Earl of Cromartie (c.1656–1731)
- George Mackenzie, 3rd Earl of Cromartie (c.1703–1766) (forfeit in 1746)

== Earls of Cromartie (1861) ==
- Anne Sutherland-Leveson-Gower, Duchess of Sutherland, 1st Countess of Cromartie (1828–1892)
- Francis Mackenzie, 2nd Earl of Cromartie (1852–1893) (abeyant 1893)
- Sibell Lilian Blunt-Mackenzie, 3rd Countess of Cromartie (1878–1962) (abeyance terminated 1895)
- Roderick Grant Francis Mackenzie, 4th Earl of Cromartie (1904–1989)
- John Ruaridh Grant Mackenzie, 5th Earl of Cromartie (born 1948)

The heir apparent is the present holder's son Colin Ruaridh Mackenzie, Viscount Tarbat (born 1987).

== See also ==
- Clan Mackenzie
- Earl of Seaforth
- Duke of Sutherland
- Earl of Sutherland
- Mackenzie baronets
- Blunt baronets
