= Cromartie Sutherland-Leveson-Gower, 4th Duke of Sutherland =

Son of George Sutherland-Leveson-Gower, 3rd Duke of Sutherland

His Grace The Duke of Sutherland KG
- Tenure: 22 September 1892 – 27 June 1913
- Predecessor: George Sutherland-Leveson-Gower, 3rd Duke of Sutherland
- Successor: George Sutherland-Leveson-Gower, 5th Duke of Sutherland
- Other titles: Earl of Sutherland
- Born: 20 July 1851; London
- Died: 27 June 1913 (aged 61)
- Spouse: Lady Millicent St Clair-Erskine (m. 1884)
- Issue: Lady Victoria Elizabeth Sutherland-Leveson-Gower; George Sutherland-Leveson-Gower, 5th Duke of Sutherland; Lord Alastair Sutherland-Leveson-Gower; Rosemary Ward, Viscountess Ednam
- Parents: George Sutherland-Leveson-Gower, 3rd Duke of Sutherland; Anne Hay-Mackenzie

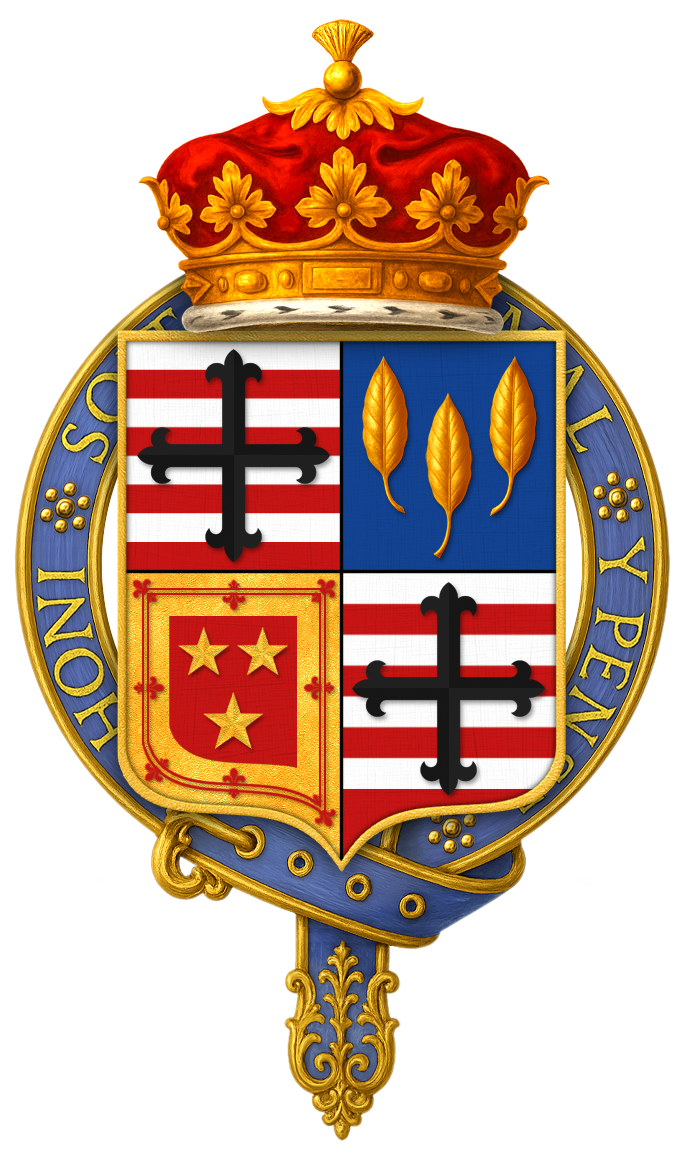
Quartered arms of Cromartie Sutherland-Leveson-Gower, 4th Duke of Sutherland, KG

Cromartie Sutherland-Leveson-Gower, 4th Duke of Sutherland (20 July 1851– 27 June 1913), styled Lord Cromartie Sutherland-Leveson-Gower until 1858, Earl Gower between 1858 and 1861 and Marquess of Stafford between 1861 and 1892, was a British peer and politician from the Leveson-Gower family.

== Early life ==
Sutherland was the eldest son of George Sutherland-Leveson-Gower, 3rd Duke of Sutherland. He was born in London and educated at Eton College.

== Career ==
As Marquess of Stafford, Sutherland entered the 2nd Life Guards as a cornet. He retired from regular army service as a lieutenant in 1875, but was commissioned Captain in the Staffordshire Yeomanry in 1876 and commanded that regiment as Lieutenant-Colonel from 1891 to 1898, after which he became its honorary colonel. He was also Lieutenant-Colonel of the Sutherland Rifles, a volunteer regiment of his ducal county in Scotland, from 1882 to 1891. From 1911 until his death he was honorary colonel of the 5th Territorial Force battalion of the Seaforth Highlanders.

Under the title of Marquess of Stafford, Sutherland served as member of parliament for Sutherland from the election of 1874, when he was unopposed, standing as a Liberal, and held the seat as a Liberal until he stood down at the 1886 election. On succeeding to his father's peerages in 1892, he became a member of the House of Lords. By then his political allegiance had shifted, and he sat on the Conservative benches. He also served as Mayor of Longton, near Stoke-on-Trent, Staffordshire, in 1895–96, and was an alderman of the borough from 1898. For some years he was Master of Foxhounds of the North Staffordshire Hunt.

Sutherland's father, the 3rd Duke, was a railway pioneer and built a 17-mile private railway with a locomotive named Dunrobin (after the family's castle). The 4th Duke had a new locomotive built, also named Dunrobin, with two private railway carriages which he used on the private line and also attached to main-line trains.

The Duke was President of the Staffordshire Territorial Forces Association from the formation of the Territorial Force in 1908.

Despite being very rich, Sutherland became concerned that his landed estates were no longer viable. Towards the end of his life, he sold properties in Great Britain and began moving his wealth to Canada. Trentham Hall, which was blighted by river pollution, was largely demolished and Stafford House (which was leased) was given up.

== Honours ==
The Duke was appointed a Knight Companion of the Order of the Garter (KG) in the 1902 Coronation Honours list published on 26 June 1902, and was invested by Edward VII at Buckingham Palace on 8 August 1902.

== Marriage and children ==
He married Lady Millicent St Clair-Erskine, daughter of Robert St Clair-Erskine, 4th Earl of Rosslyn, on 20 October 1884. They had four children:

- Lady Victoria Elizabeth Sutherland-Leveson-Gower (1885–1888), died young.
- George Granville Sutherland-Leveson-Gower, 5th Duke of Sutherland (1888–1963)
- Lord Alastair St. Clair Sutherland-Leveson-Gower (1890–1921), married Elizabeth Demarest (former wife of John G. A. Leishman Jr., only son of John George Alexander Leishman). They were the parents of Elizabeth Sutherland, 24th Countess of Sutherland.
- Lady Rosemary Millicent Sutherland-Leveson-Gower (1893–1930), dated Edward, Prince of Wales before marrying William Ward, 3rd Earl of Dudley and had issue. Died in a plane crash with Frederick Hamilton-Temple-Blackwood, 3rd Marquess of Dufferin and Ava.

In 1900 the Duke of Sutherland owned about 1,358,000 acres (550,000 hectares) and the steam yacht Catania, which was chartered by some of the super-rich of that era.

The Duke died at Dunrobin Castle, Sutherland, on 27 June 1913, aged 61, and was buried at Dunrobin.

Parliament of the United Kingdom
Preceded by Lord Ronald Gower	Member of Parliament for Sutherland; 1874–1886	Succeeded by Angus Sutherland
Honorary titles
Preceded by The 3rd Duke of Sutherland	Lord Lieutenant of Sutherland; 1892–1913	Succeeded by The 5th Duke of Sutherland
Peerage of the United Kingdom
Preceded by George Sutherland-Leveson-Gower	Duke of Sutherland; 1892–1913	Succeeded by George Sutherland-Leveson-Gower
