= Blunt baronets =

Title in the Baronetage of Great Britain

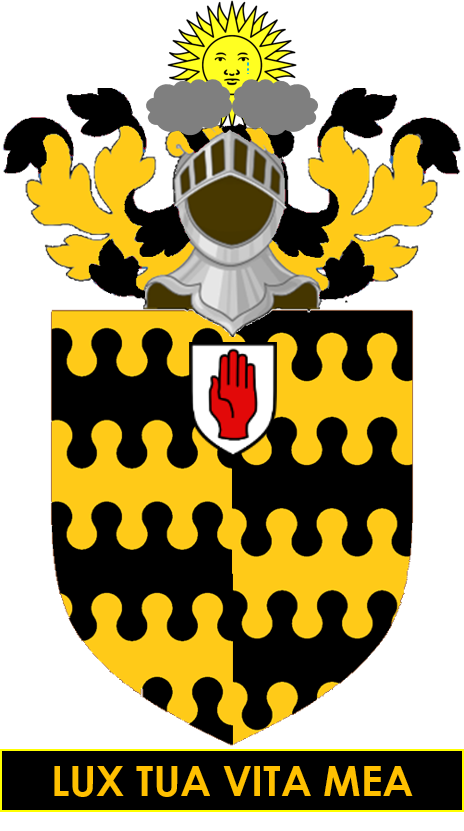
Arms: Per pale Or and Sable barry nebuly of six counterchanged; Crest: Issuing out of Clouds a Sun in Splendour charged with an Eye issuing Tears all proper; Motto: Lux Tua Vita Mea (Thy light is my life)

The Blunt Baronetcy, of the City of London, is a title in the Baronetage of Great Britain. It was created on 17 June 1720 for John Blunt, the famous perpetrator of the South Sea Bubble, for his good work for the nation of Great Britain. From 1703 he was the secretary of the Hollow Sword Blade Company, a joint-stock company effectively operating as a bank. He was a director of the South Sea Company from 1711. He was the main architect of the ambitious scheme for the company to assume the National Debt, and when the bribery and fraud were revealed, Parliament confiscated all his assets except £5,000, while most directors were allowed to retain £10,000.

His great-grandson, the fourth Baronet, represented Lewes in the House of Commons from 1831 to 1840. His line of the family failed on the death of his son, the fifth Baronet, in 1847. The late Baronet was succeeded by his first cousin, the sixth Baronet. He was the son of Richard Charles Blunt, second son of the third Baronet. He died unmarried and was succeeded by his first cousin, the seventh Baronet. He was the son of William Blunt, third son of the third Baronet. He died childless and was succeeded by his younger brother, the eighth Baronet. He fought in the Indian Rebellion of 1857. The baronetcy descended in the direct line until the death of his grandson, the tenth Baronet, in 1969. He was succeeded by his younger brother, the eleventh Baronet. As of 2007 the title is held by the latter's son, the twelfth Baronet, who succeeded in 1975.

== Blunt baronets, of the City of London (1720) ==
- Sir John Blunt, 1st Baronet (1665–1733)
- Sir Henry Blunt, 2nd Baronet (1696–1759)
- Sir Charles William Blunt, 3rd Baronet (1731–1802)
- Sir Charles Richard Blunt, 4th Baronet (1775–1840)
- Sir Walter Blunt, 5th Baronet (1826–1847)
- Sir Charles William Blunt, 6th Baronet (1810–1890)
- Sir William Blunt, 7th Baronet (1826–1902). He was the son of William Blunt, third son of the third Baronet, and succeeded his cousin. He served in the Bengal Civil Service from 1846 to 1875. He married twice, in 1852 Margaret Scott (died 1854), daughter of Captain Scott; then in 1857 to a daughter of Rev. Robert Green Jeston, she died in 1892. He died childless and was succeeded by his younger brother.
- Sir John Harvey Blunt, 8th Baronet (1839–1922)
- Sir John Harvey Blunt, 9th Baronet (1872–1938) m. Maud Julia daughter of Sir David Lionel Goldsmid-Stern-Salomons
- Sir John Lionel Reginald Blunt, 10th Baronet (1908–1969)
- Sir Richard David Harvey Blunt, 11th Baronet (1912–1975)
- Sir David Richard Reginald Harvey Blunt, 12th Baronet (born 1938)

The heir presumptive is Jonathan Stuart Needham (formerly Blunt) (born 1955), a great-grandson of the 8th Baronet. His surname was changed to that of his stepfather.

== Extended family ==
- Major-General Charles Harris Blunt (1825–1900) was grandson of Walter Blunt, younger son of the 2nd Baronet. His son Lieutenant-Colonel Edward Walter Blunt (1869–1949) married Sibell Lilian Blunt-Mackenzie, 3rd Countess of Cromartie. Consequently, their grandson John Ruaridh Grant Mackenzie, 5th Earl of Cromartie, is also in remainder to the Blunt Baronetcy of London.
- Charles Harris Blunt's daughter was the folklorist Janet Blunt, who collected many traditional songs and played a role in the twentieth century revival of Morris Dancing.

== See also ==
- Earl of Cromartie

== Notes ==
Baronetage of Great Britain
Preceded by Chardin baronets	Blunt baronets of the City of London; 17 June 1720	Succeeded by Mosley baronets
