= George Sutherland-Leveson-Gower, 3rd Duke of Sutherland =

British politician

His Grace The Duke of Sutherland KG FRS
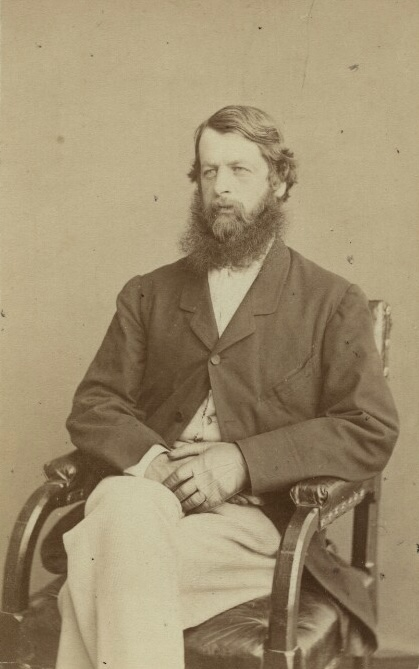
- The Duke of Sutherland, c. 1865

Lord Lieutenant of Sutherland
- In office 1861–1892
- Preceded by: The Duke of Sutherland
- Succeeded by: The Duke of Sutherland

Member of Parliament for Sutherland
- In office 1852–1861
- Preceded by: Sir David Dundas
- Succeeded by: Sir David Dundas

Personal details
- Born: George Granville William Sutherland-Leveson-Gower; 19 December 1828 Hamilton Place, London, England
- Died: 22 September 1892 (aged 63) Dunrobin Castle, Sutherland, Scotland
- Spouses: Anne Hay-Mackenzie (m. 1849; died 1888) Mary Caroline Blair (m. 1889)
- Relations: See Leveson-Gower family
- Children: George Sutherland-Leveson-Gower, Earl Gower; Cromartie Sutherland-Leveson-Gower, 4th Duke of Sutherland; Francis Mackenzie Sutherland-Leveson-Gower, 2nd Earl of Cromartie; Lady Florence Chaplin; Lady Alexandra Sutherland-Leveson-Gower
- Parent(s): George Sutherland-Leveson-Gower, 2nd Duke of Sutherland (father); Lady Harriet Howard (mother)
- Education: Eton College; King's College London

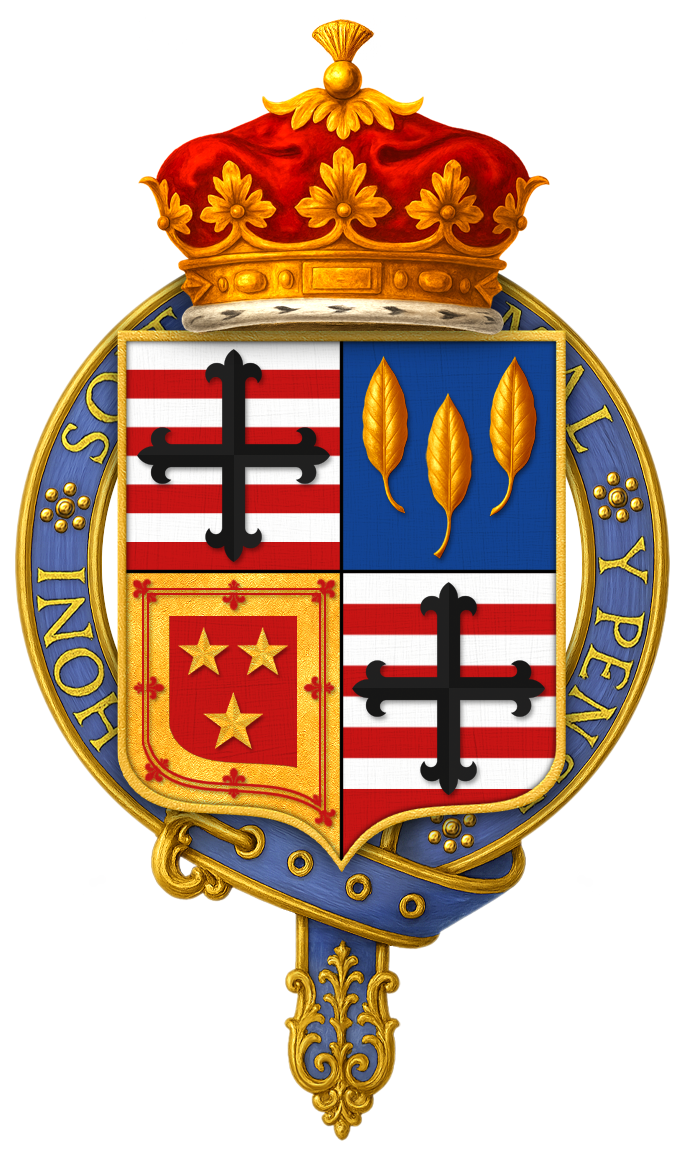
Quartered arms of George Sutherland-Leveson-Gower, 3rd Duke of Sutherland, KG, FRS

George Granville William Sutherland-Leveson-Gower, 3rd Duke of Sutherland, KG FRS (19 December 1828 – 22 September 1892), styled Viscount Trentham until 1833, Earl Gower in 1833 and Marquess of Stafford between 1833 and 1861, was a British peer and politician from the Leveson-Gower family.

== Early life ==
Sutherland was born on 19 December 1828 at Hamilton Place, London. He was the son of George Sutherland-Leveson-Gower, 2nd Duke of Sutherland and Lady Harriet Elizabeth Georgiana Howard.

He was educated at Eton College and King's College London.

== Career ==
Sutherland was Liberal Member of Parliament for Sutherland from 1852 until he succeeded his father as Duke in 1861.

He took part in a number of state occasions. He was one of the British delegation to the coronation of Tsar Alexander II of Russia in 1856, hosted the public visit by Garibaldi to Britain in 1864, attended the opening of the Suez Canal in 1869, and accompanied the Prince of Wales (later Edward VII) on his state visit to India in 1876.

He was Lord Lieutenant of Cromarty from 1852 until the role was abolished in 1891, and Lord Lieutenant of Sutherland from 1861 until his death.

Sutherland hosted Ulysses S. Grant at Dunrobin when the former president visited Scotland in 1878. He later chaired a committee that organised charitable work to help those involved with the Turko-Russian and Zulu wars.

=== Military positions and honours ===
Sutherland was Colonel of the Sutherland Regiment of Highland Volunteers from 1864 to 1882, and of the 20th Middlesex Rifle Volunteer Corps (Railway Rifles) in 1867. He was awarded Honorary Membership of the Institution of Engineers and Shipbuilders in Scotland in 1859. He was made KG in 1864, and FRS in 1870. He was a Knight Grand Cross of the Order of the Redeemer of Greece.

== Railway interests ==
The Third Duke played a key role in the early history of the Highland Railway, being a founder board member of the company and contributing extensively towards the Sutherland Railway, building the Duke of Sutherland's Railway out of his own pocket and also supporting the Sutherland and Caithness Railway. The Highland Railway operated these lines, absorbing them in 1884.

He was President of the Mont Cenis Railway Company which built the first Fell railway and operated it from 1868–1871 to provide a temporary route over the Alps for rail passengers from Calais to Brindisi until the completion of the Fréjus Rail Tunnel.

== Personal life ==
He married, firstly, Anne Hay-Mackenzie (1829–1888), later created Countess of Cromartie in her own right, on 27 June 1849, at Cliveden House in Buckinghamshire. Together, they had five children:

- George Granville Sutherland-Leveson-Gower, Earl Gower (1850–1858), who died young.
- Cromartie Sutherland-Leveson-Gower, 4th Duke of Sutherland (1851–1913)
- Francis Mackenzie Sutherland-Leveson-Gower, 2nd Earl of Cromartie (1852–1893)
- Lady Florence Sutherland-Leveson-Gower (1855–1881), who married Henry Chaplin, 1st Viscount Chaplin and had issue. She narrowly escaped death on 3 August 1873 when the railway carriage she was travelling in was derailed in the Wigan rail crash.
- Lady Alexandra Sutherland-Leveson-Gower (1866–1891), who died unmarried.

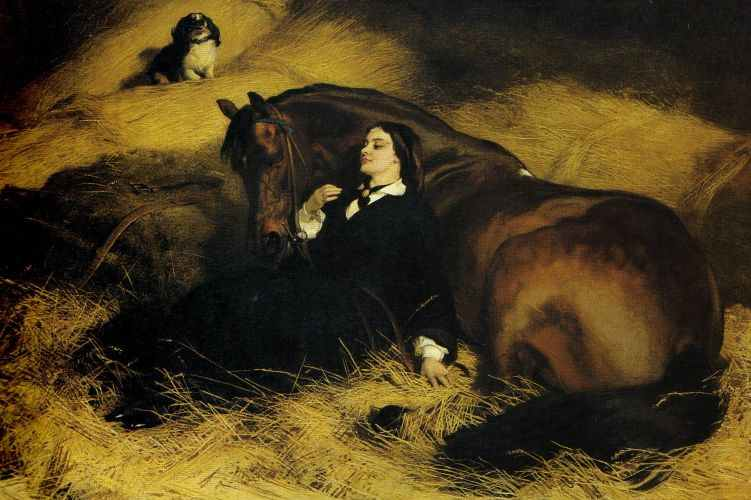
The Shrew Tamed by Edwin Landseer, showing Gilbert and purchased by the Duke.

Sutherland was estranged from his wife Anne for many years before her death in November 1888. Whilst she was still alive he had relationships with artists' model Annie Gilbert and with Mary Caroline (née Michell) Blair, daughter of Rev. Richard Michell, DD and wife of Captain Arthur Kindersley Blair of the 71st Highland Light Infantry.

In 1861 Blair resigned his commission in the Highlanders and became a land agent and business manager for Sutherland, with his wife becoming Sutherland's mistress. Although Blair's death in 1883 was officially recorded as accidental, there was considerable speculation, at the time and later, that it may have been suicide or even murder. On 4 March 1889, less than four months after Anne's death, Sutherland and Mary married, with the Bishop of Florida, Edwin Garner Weed, officiating. This caused another scandal as the conventional minimum period between the death of a spouse and remarriage was one year.

The 3rd Duke of Sutherland died, aged sixty-three, at Dunrobin Castle, and was buried on 29 September 1892 at Trentham in Staffordshire. He was succeeded in his titles by his eldest surviving son, Cromartie. Their second, Francis, had succeeded to his wife's titles as the 2nd Earl of Cromartie upon her death in 1888.

=== Estate ===
He owned nearly 1,000,000 acres, with most holdings in Sutherland in addition to 17,000 acres in Salop and 12,000 in Stafford.

Shortly before his death, Sutherland effectively disinherited his natural heirs and tried to leave all his money to his second wife, who was later found guilty of destroying documents and was imprisoned for six weeks. The family later made a substantial settlement in her favour, enabling her to build Carbisdale Castle between 1906 and 1917. Prior to this, she had resided at Sutherland Grange at Dedworth adjoining Windsor in Berkshire. Sutherland's widow, known as Duchess Blair or the Dowager Duchess of Sutherland, married thirdly on 12 November 1896 (sep 1904) as his second wife Sir Albert Kaye Rollit (1842–1922), MP for Islington South. She enjoyed an income of £100,000 until her death according to one source.

Parliament of the United Kingdom
Preceded by Sir David Dundas	Member of Parliament for Sutherland; 1852–1861	Succeeded by Sir David Dundas
Honorary titles
Preceded by Roderick McLeod	Lord Lieutenant of Cromarty; 1853–1891	Office abolished
Preceded by The 2nd Duke of Sutherland	Lord Lieutenant of Sutherland; 1861–1892	Succeeded by The 4th Duke of Sutherland
Peerage of the United Kingdom
Preceded by George Sutherland-Leveson-Gower	Duke of Sutherland; 1861–1892	Succeeded by Cromartie Sutherland-Leveson-Gower
