= Anne Sutherland-Leveson-Gower, Duchess of Sutherland =

British peeress

Her Grace The Duchess of Sutherland VA
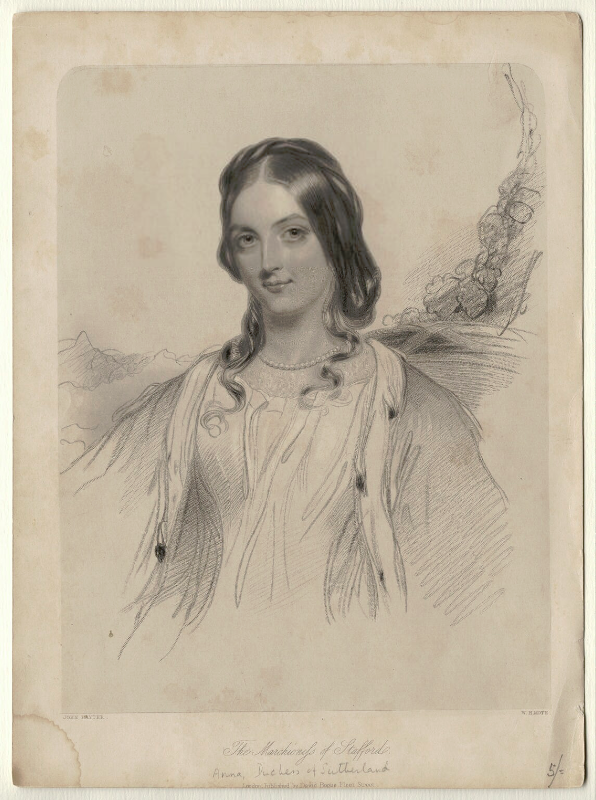

Mistress of the Robes
- In office 1870–1874
- Monarch: Victoria
- Preceded by: The Duchess of Argyll
- Succeeded by: The Duchess of Wellington

Personal details
- Born: Anne Hay-Mackenzie; 21 April 1829
- Died: 25 November 1888 (aged 59) Stafford House, St James's, London, England
- Spouse: George Sutherland-Leveson-Gower, 3rd Duke of Sutherland (m. 1849)
- Children: George Sutherland-Leveson-Gower, Earl Gower; Cromartie Sutherland-Leveson-Gower, 4th Duke of Sutherland; Francis Mackenzie Sutherland-Leveson-Gower, 2nd Earl of Cromartie; Lady Florence Chaplin; Lady Alexandra Sutherland-Leveson-Gower
- Parent(s): John Hay-Mackenzie of Newhall and Cromarty (father); Anne Gibson-Craig (mother)

Anne Sutherland-Leveson-Gower, Duchess of Sutherland VA (née Hay-Mackenzie; 21 April 1829 – 25 November 1888), also suo jure 1st Countess of Cromartie and styled Marchioness of Stafford from 1849 to 1861, was a British noblewoman and peeress.

== Early life ==
Anne Hay-Mackenzie was born on 21 April 1829. She was the only child of John Hay-Mackenzie of Newhall and Cromarty and the former Anne Gibson-Craig.

Her mother was the third daughter of Sir James Gibson-Craig, 1st Baronet. Her father was the eldest son and heir of Edward Hay-Mackenzie of Newhall and the former Hon. Maria Murray-Mackenzie of Cromartie (eldest daughter and heiress of line of George Murray-Mackenzie, 6th Lord Elibank and Lady Isabella Mackenzie, eldest daughter and heiress of line of George Mackenzie, 3rd Earl of Cromartie, who took part in the Jacobite rising of 1745 and was attainted in 1746). His grandfather was also the younger brother of George Hay, 7th Marquess of Tweeddale.

== Countess of Cromartie ==
On 21 October 1861, the title held by her great-great-grandfather, George Mackenzie, 3rd Earl of Cromartie, was revived when the Duchess of Sutherland was created, in her own right, Baroness Castlehaven, of Castlehaven, Baroness Macleod, of Castle Leod, Viscountess Tarbat, of Tarbat, all in the County of Cromarty, and Countess of Cromartie, all with remainder firstly to Francis Sutherland-Leveson-Gower, her second surviving son, and the heirs male of his body, secondly to each of her younger sons in like manner in priority of birth, thirdly to said Francis Sutherland-Leveson-Gower and the heirs of his body, fourthly to each other her younger sons in like manner in priority of birth, fifthly to her daughter Florence Sutherland-Leveson-Gower and the heirs of her body, and sixthly to each other of her daughters in like manner in priority of birth "provided that if the said Francis Sutherland-Leveson-Gower or any other person taking under the said letters patent shall succeed to the Earldom of Sutherland, and there shall upon or at any time after the occurrence of such event be any other younger son or other daughter of the said Anne, Duchess of Sutherland, or any heir of the body of such other son or daughter, then, and so often as the same may happen, the succession to the honours and dignities thereby created shall devolve on the son or daughter of the said Anne, or their heirs, who would be next entitled to succeed to the said honours if the person so succeeding to the Earldom of Sutherland were dead without issue."

She later served as Mistress of the Robes to Queen Victoria from 1870 to 1874, and was awarded the Order of Victoria and Albert (3rd class).

== Personal life ==
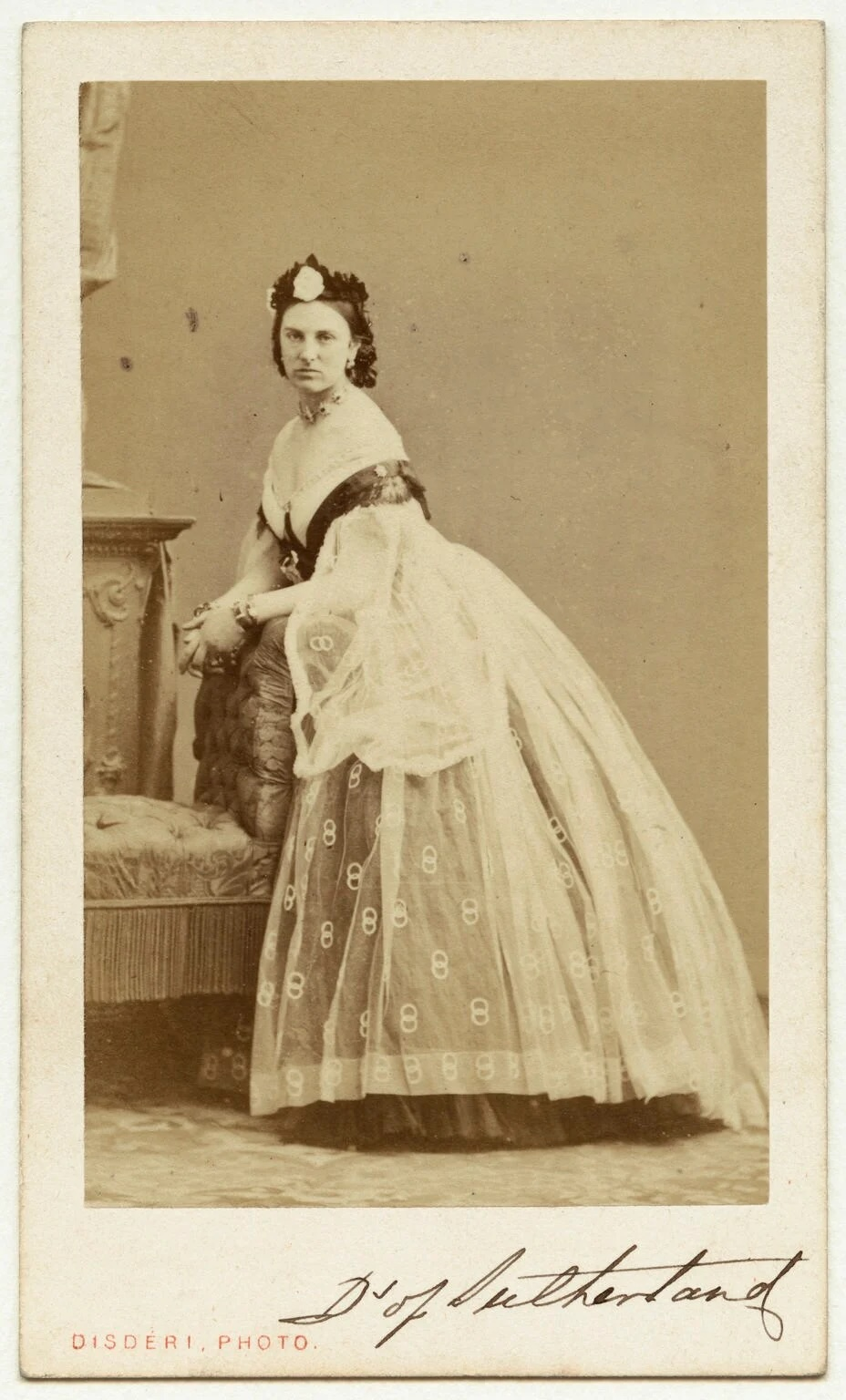
Photograph of the Duchess of Sutherland, by André-Adolphe-Eugène Disdéri, c. 1860s

On 27 June 1849 she married George Sutherland-Leveson-Gower, Marquess of Stafford, eldest son of George Sutherland-Leveson-Gower, 2nd Duke of Sutherland. He succeeded as third Duke of Sutherland on 22 February 1861. The Duchess of Sutherland had succeeded to her father's lands in the year of her marriage. Together, they had five children:

- George Granville Sutherland-Leveson-Gower, Earl Gower (1850–1858), who died young.
- Cromartie Sutherland-Leveson-Gower, 4th Duke of Sutherland (1851–1913)
- Francis Mackenzie Sutherland-Leveson-Gower, 2nd Earl of Cromartie (1852–1893)
- Lady Florence Sutherland-Leveson-Gower (1855–1881), who married Henry Chaplin, 1st Viscount Chaplin and had issue.
- Lady Alexandra Sutherland-Leveson-Gower (1866–1891), who died unmarried.

She died at the family's London mansion, Stafford House, St James's, and was buried at the Extra Mural Cemetery (now Barton Road Cemetery or "The Old Cemetery"), Torquay in section D (grid ref: 50.484307, -3.542972). An ornate cross mounted on a three step plinth has the following inscriptions: In Loving Memory of Anne (top step). Duchess of Sutherland Countess of Cromartie Wife of George Granville Third Duke of Sutherland Born 21 April 1829 Died 25 November 1888 (middle step). For God so loved the world that he gave his only begotten Son that whosoever believeth in Him should not perish but have everlasting life. Looking to Jesus the author and finisher of our faith (bottom step).

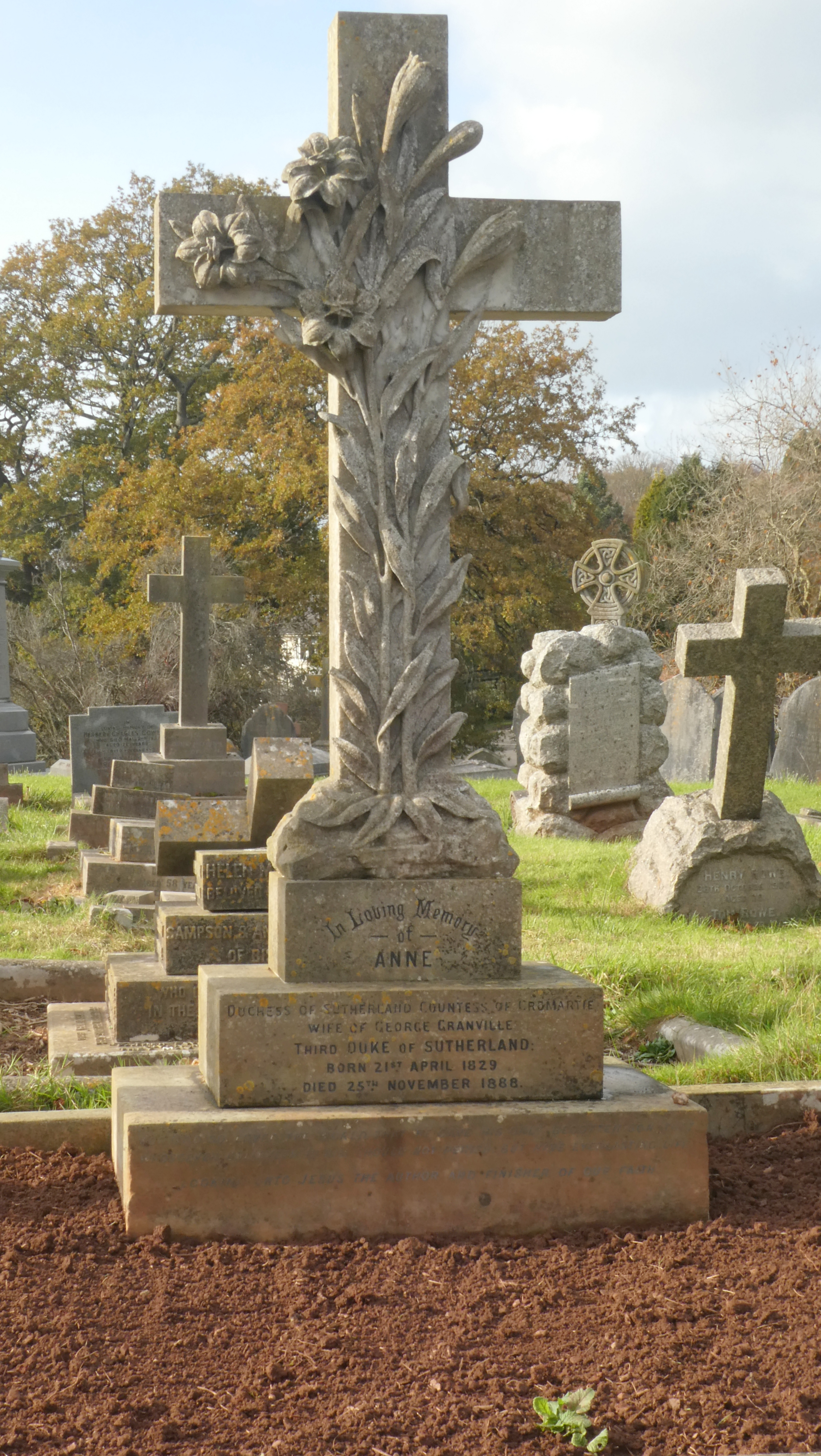

She had been a devout worshipper at All Saints Church, Babbacombe, and her interment was presided over by the church's first incumbent, Father John Hewett, a personal friend of the Duchess. On her death she was succeeded in her earldom according to the special remainder by her younger son Lord Francis. The Duke of Sutherland died in 1892 and was succeeded by their eldest surviving son Cromartie.

Court offices
| Preceded by The Duchess of Argyll | Mistress of the Robes to Queen Victoria; 1870–1874 | Succeeded by The Duchess of Wellington |
Peerage of the United Kingdom
| New creation | Countess of Cromartie; 1861–1888 | Succeeded by Francis Mackenzie |
