= Strathpeffer =

Coordinates: 57.5832°N 4.5457°W

Strathpeffer: Scottish Gaelic: Srath Pheofhair
- Location within the Ross and Cromarty area
- Population: 1,040 (2020)
- OS grid reference: NH478576
  - Edinburgh: 125 miles (200 km)
  - London: 600 miles (735 km)
- Council area: Highland
- Lieutenancy area: Ross and Cromarty
- Country: Scotland
- Sovereign state: United Kingdom
- Post town: STRATHPEFFER
- Postcode district: IV14
- Dialling code: 01997
- Police: Scotland
- Fire: Scottish
- Ambulance: Scottish
- UK Parliament: Caithness, Sutherland and Easter Ross
- Scottish Parliament: Caithness, Sutherland and Ross

Strathpeffer (Scottish Gaelic: Srath Pheofhair) is a village and spa town in Ross and Cromarty, Highland, Scotland, with a population of 1,469.

== Geography ==
It lies in a strath 5 miles (8 km) west of Dingwall, with the elevation ranging from 60 to 120 m (200 to 400 ft) above sea level. Sheltered on the west and north, it has a comparatively dry and warm climate.

== History ==
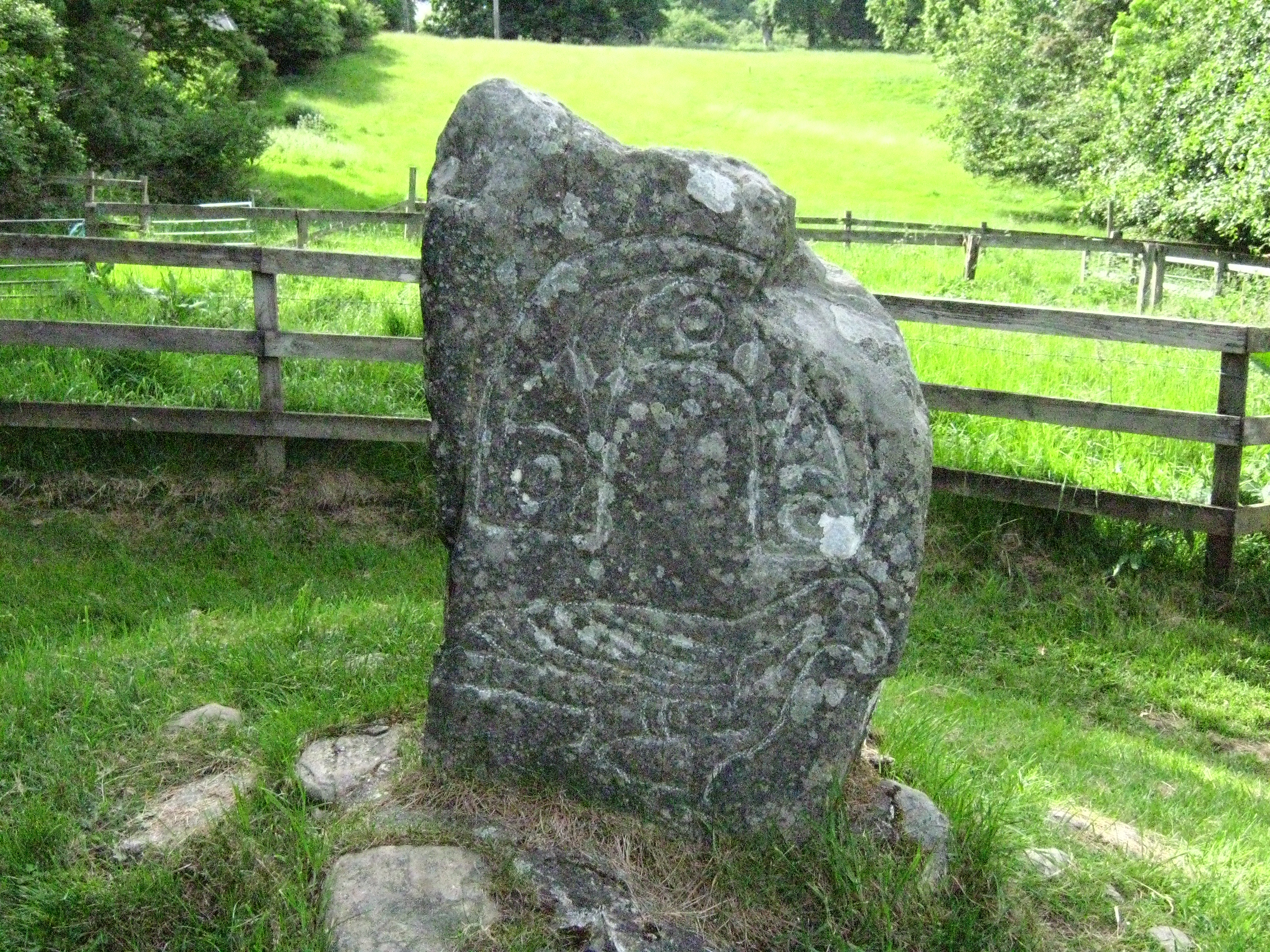
Clach an Tiompain (also known as the Eagle Stone), a Class 1 Pictish symbol stone in Strathpeffer

The strategic location of the village has led to several battles being fought in the area:

- Blar Nan Ceann (battle (field) of the heads), lies at the western end of the modern village (grid reference NH47625773). Very little is known about the battle there, not even its date, other than the MacKenzies of Seaforth defeated the MacDonells of Glengarry and some incident took place at a well near the battlefield, subsequently called Tobar a' Chinn (well of the head).
- Battle of Blar Na Pairce (battle (field) of the park), in approximately 1486 saw the local MacKenzies, under their chief Kenneth MacKenzie, defeat a large invading force of MacDonalds. The battlefield lies south-west of the modern village, on the banks of Loch Kinellan. The loch contains a crannog, which remained a hunting seat of the Earls of Ross until the late medieval period and was reportedly visited by Robert The Bruce during his reign. It was from this crannog that Kenneth MacKenzie went out to meet the MacDonalds.
- The Battle of Drumchatt, which took place in 1497 on Drumchatt (Druimchat) or "the Cat's Back", a ridge to the southeast of Strathpeffer. The Clan Mackenzie and Clan Munro defeated the invading Clan MacDonald of Lochalsh.

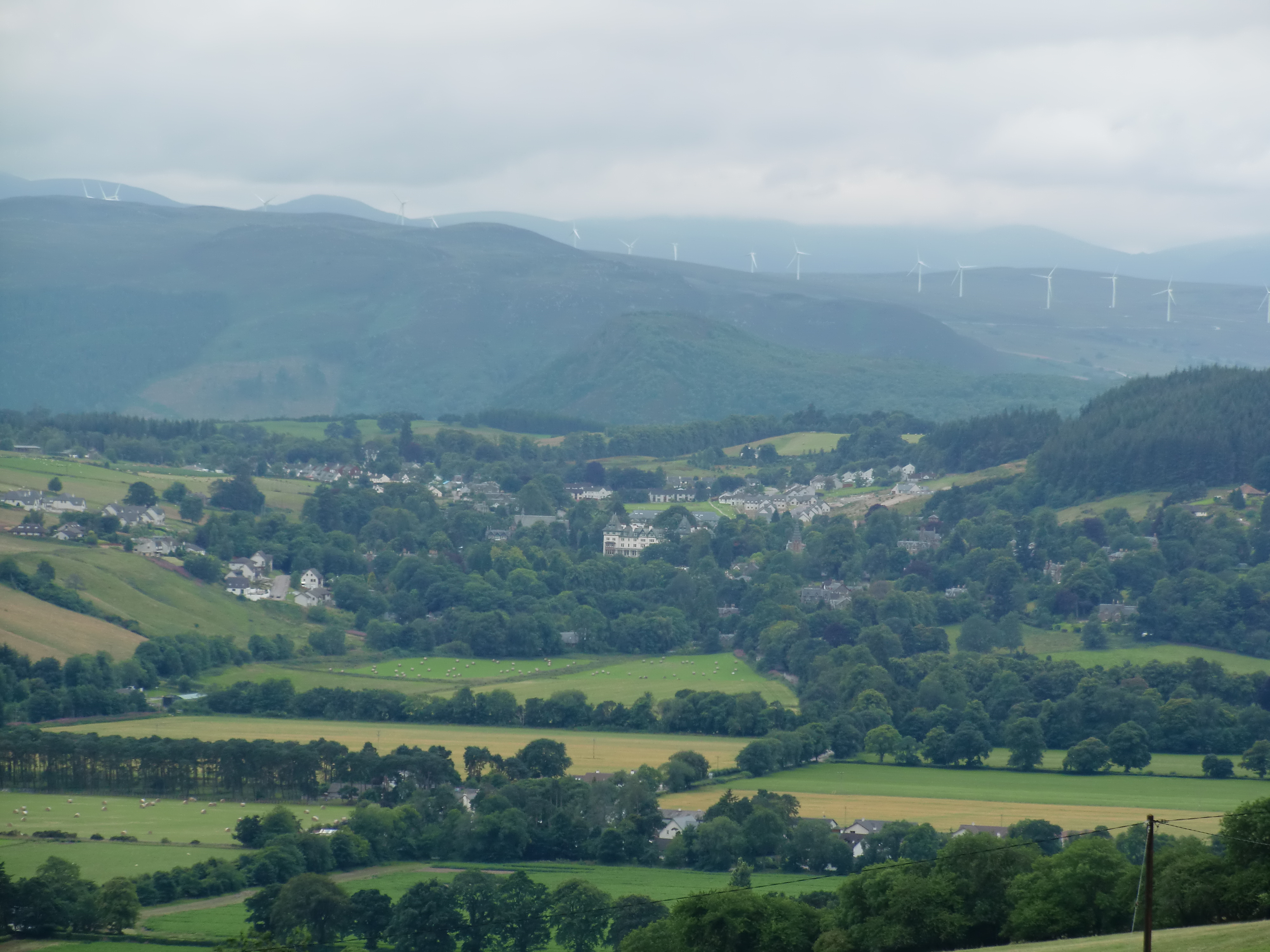
Strathpeffer from the north east

In the Victorian era Strathpeffer was popular as a spa resort, owing to the discovery of sulphurous springs in the 18th century. The pump-room in the middle of the village dates from 1819. Soon after that, a hospital and a hotel were also built. During World War 1, the hospital was a convalescent US Naval Hospital. In 1942 the Spa hospital was destroyed by fire. The Strathpeffer Pavilion dates from 1880, and was built to provide a venue for entertainment of the visitors. It fell into disuse and disrepair towards the end of last century, but has now been restored as a new venue for the arts, weddings, other functions, and events of all kinds.

Coal like material was found near Castle Leod in the 1700s and was worked for a short time. The material was evaluated by well known Mining Engineer John Geddes in the mid 1800s but it is not known if his suggestion that it should be further evaluated was implemented.

== Railway ==
The arrival of the railways in Dingwall in 1862 did much to bring more visitors to the town. In 1885 a branch line from the Kyle of Lochalsh Line was built and Strathpeffer railway station was opened on 3 June; the most logical route for the line was through the town, but disagreements with landowners initially prevented the railway from crossing their land. The branch closed in February 1946. The station now contains a variety of shops and craft outlets as well as the Highland Museum of Childhood. The station building itself is of classic Victorian architecture and still has the original platform which many shops front onto. The nearest stations are now in Dingwall and Garve.

A project is under way by the Strathpeffer Spa Railway Association to restore some of the track, buy an engine and run a short heritage line.

== Tourism ==
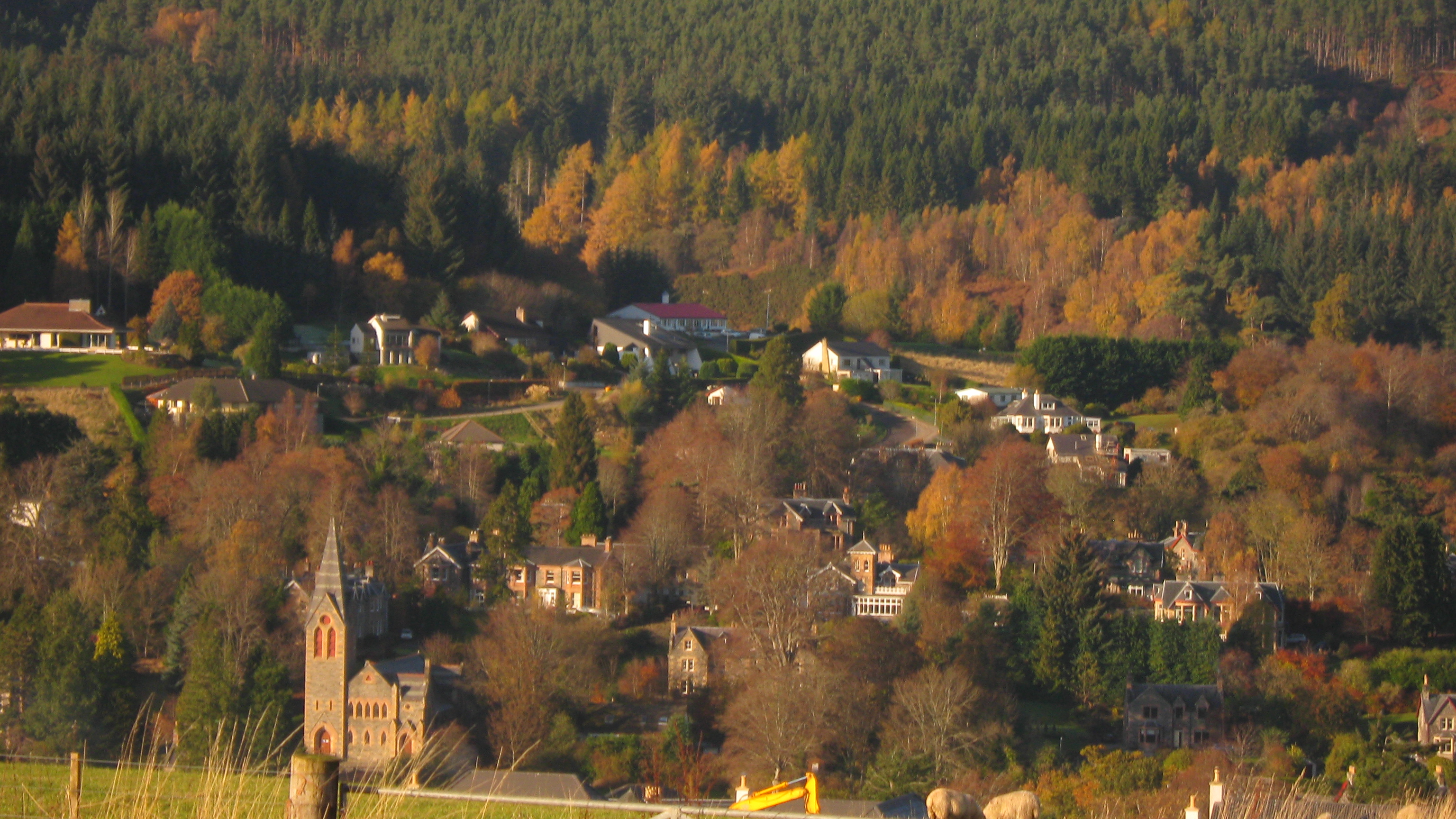
A view across Strathpeffer (facing north)

Strathpeffer's distinctive Victorian architecture has added to its appeal. Strathpeffer contains several large hotels and many guest houses, holiday cottages and B&B establishments. There is a scenic golf course, which boasts the longest drop from tee to green of any course in Scotland.

Strathpeffer is the home of one of the world's most extreme mountain bike races, the Strathpuffer, a 24-hour event held in January each year. Organised by Square Wheels bike shop, it uses the local trail network and regularly attracts over 400 competitors.

The Strathpeffer and District Pipe Band and local Highland dancers perform in the square every Saturday from end May to September, and this is a popular gathering for both visitors and residents. Nearby is Castle Leod, seat of the Earl of Cromartie, Chief of the Clan Mackenzie, which is now open to the public several times a year. The annual Strathpeffer Highland Gathering, one of the longest-established Highland Games in Scotland, takes place in the grounds of Castle Leod every August.

== Music ==
Strathpeffer Pavilion has hosted acts such as Deacon Blue, The Kaiser Chiefs and Edwyn Collins. Strathpeffer and District Pipe Band was formed in 1980 and play regularly in the square.

== Sport ==
Strathpeffer is the home of Caberfeidh Camanachd Club who play their home games at Castle Leod. The team currently play in shinty's National Division One. They also field a reserve team in North Division Two. The team have twice won shinty's premier competition, the Camanachd Cup; in 1934 and 1939.

== Notable people ==
- Charles Kennedy (1959–2015) MP for the then seat of Ross, Cromarty & Skye lived here in the 1980s and early 1990s.
- Rev William Fraser (1851–1919) minister of Strathpeffer Free Church 1908 to 1919.
- Fin Graham, Paralympic double silver medallist in track cycling.
