= Alexander Ross (architect) =

Scottish architect (1834-1925)

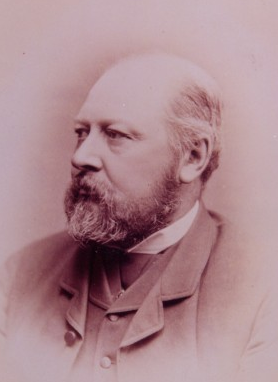
Alexander Ross, architect, around 1875

Alexander Ross FRIBA LLD (9 July 1834 – 19 May 1925) was a 19th/20th century Scottish architect specialising in churches, especially for the Free Church of Scotland and the Scottish Episcopal Church. He was Provost of Inverness from 1889 to 1895.

He is probably the single most important person in moulding the city of Inverness, both socially and physically. Furthermore, he is responsible for a very high proportion of Inverness's churches, offices, public buildings, shops, tenements and villas.

== Life ==
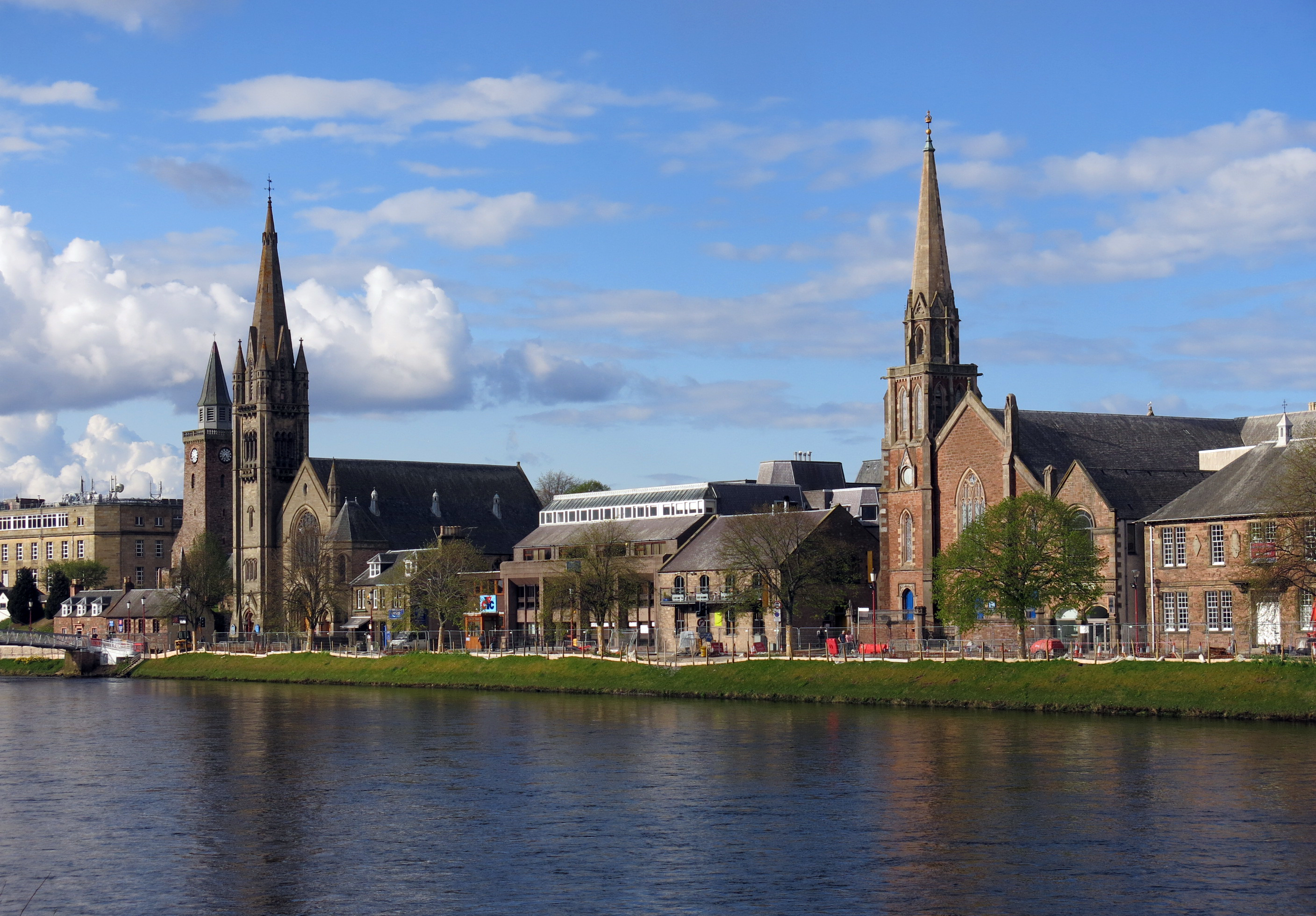
Free North Church (left) in its riverside setting in Inverness

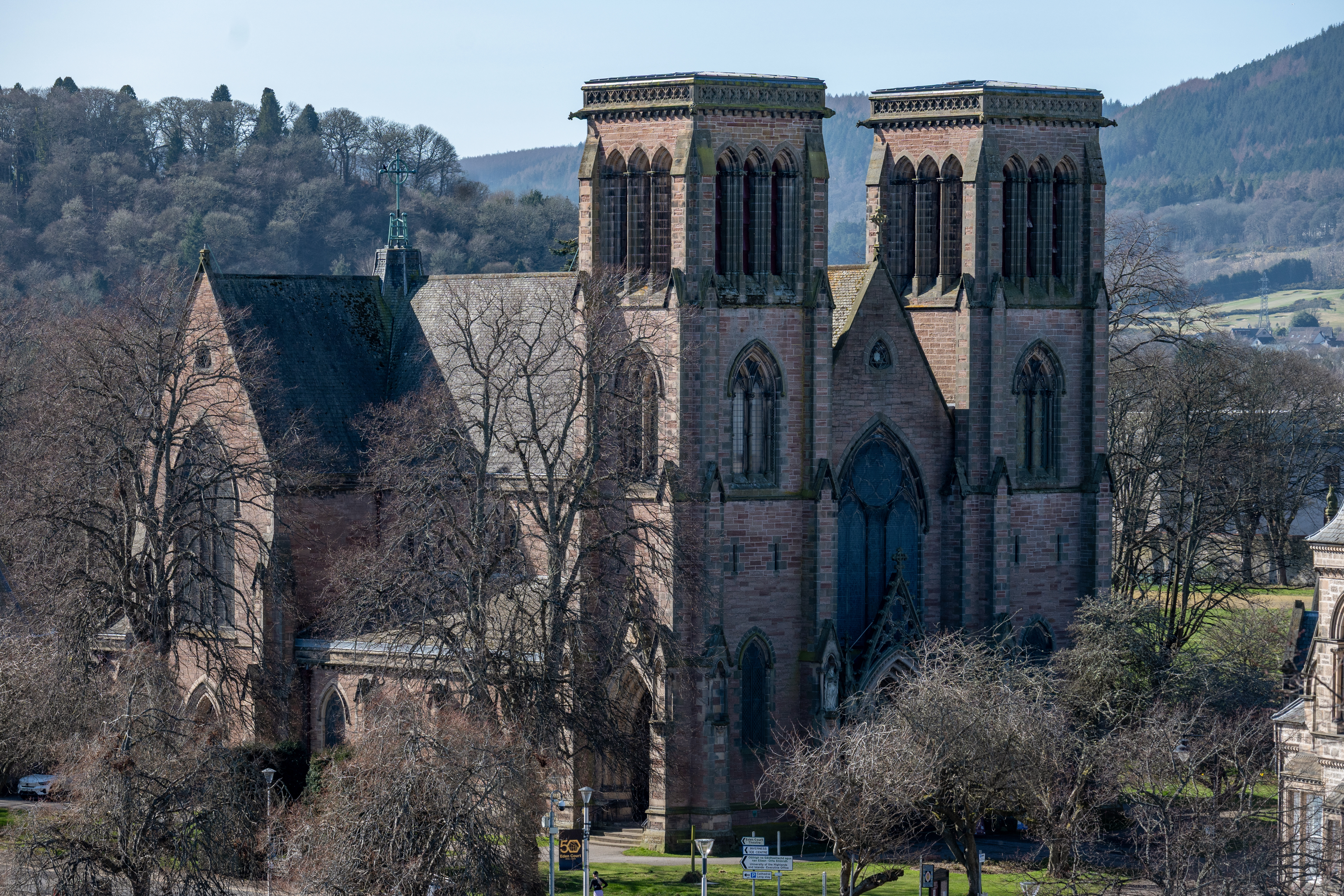
St Andrew's Cathedral Inverness

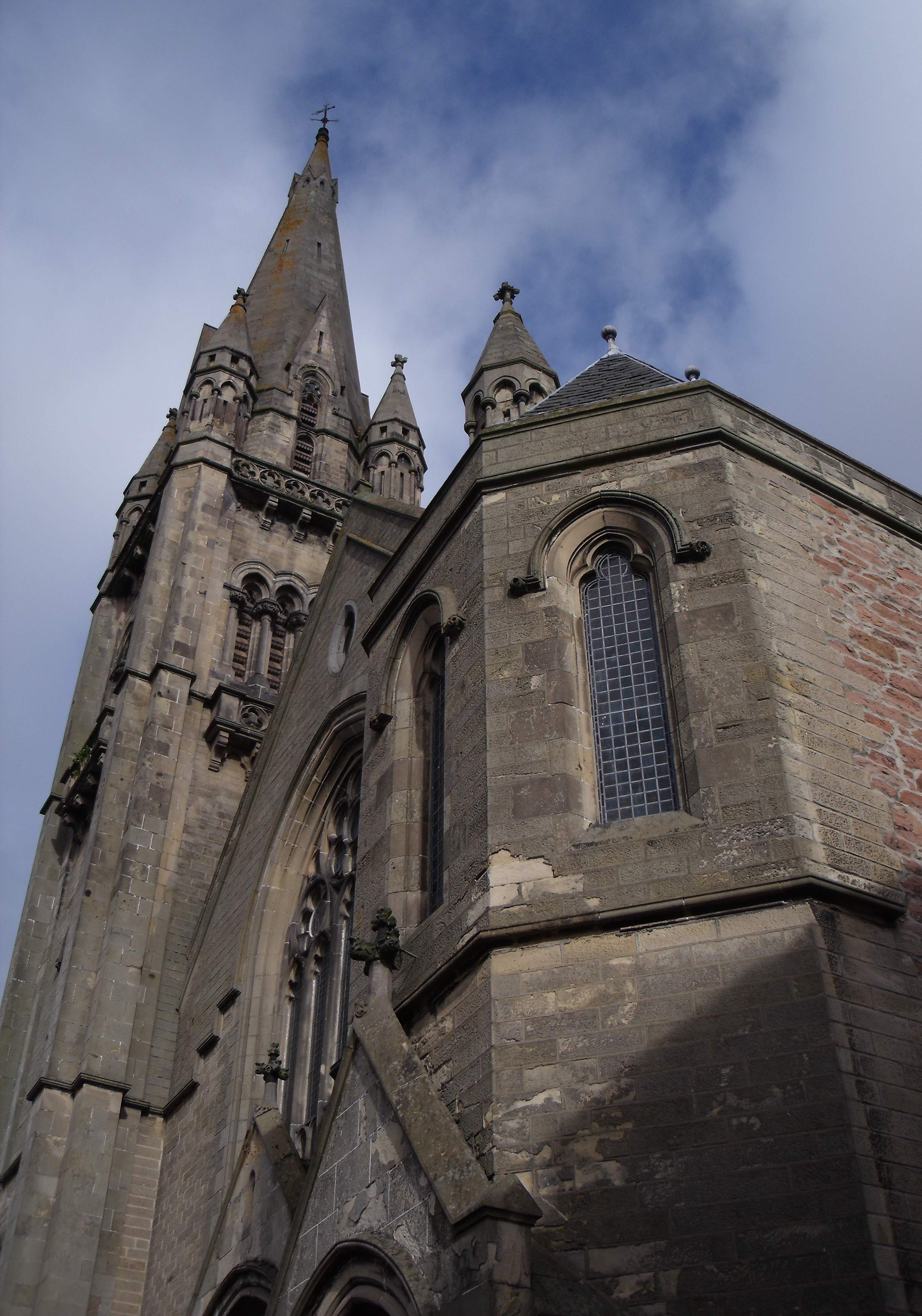
Free North Church, Inverness

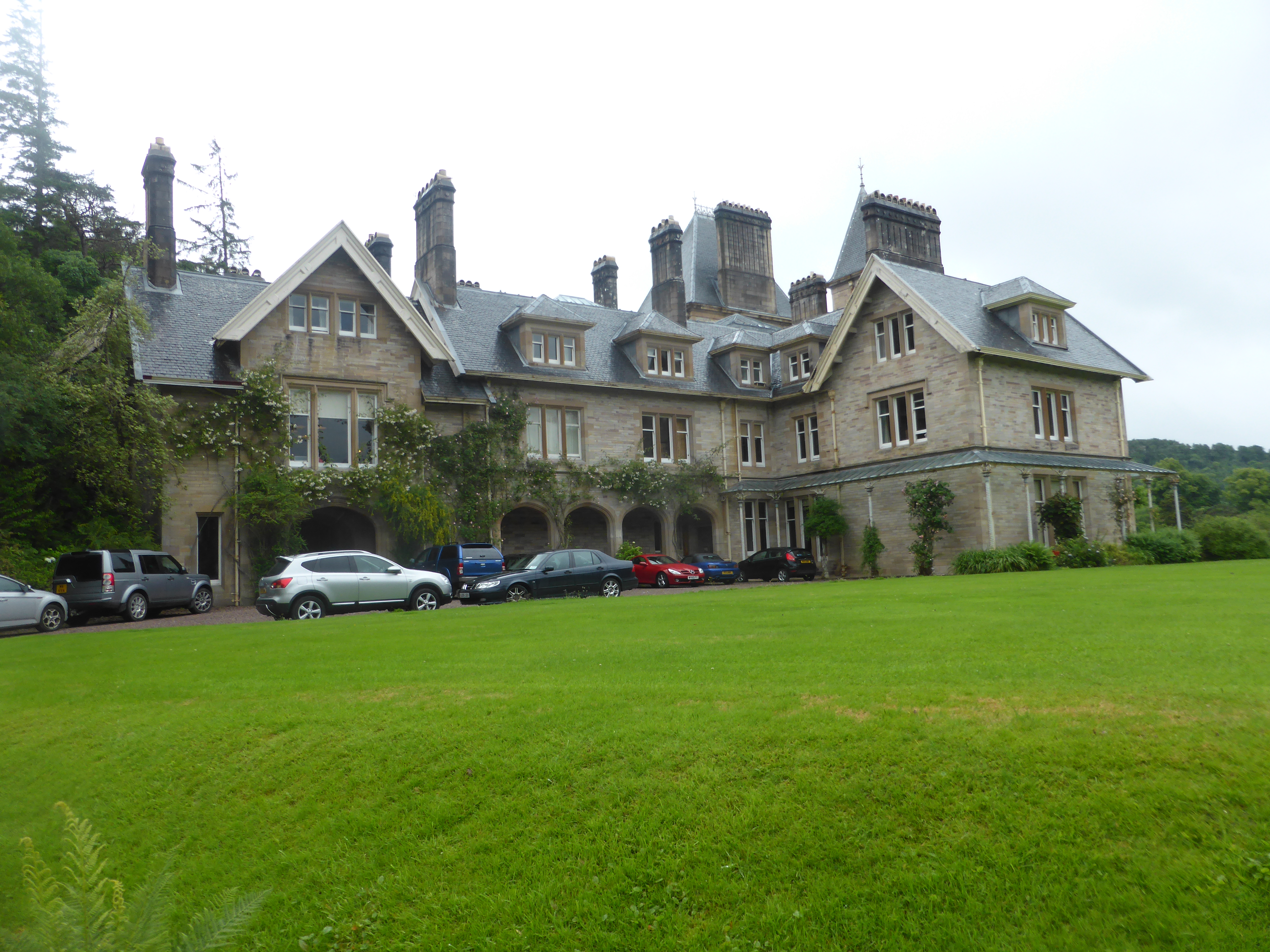
Ardtornish House

He was born on 9 July 1834 at Huntly Hill in Stracathro near Brechin in Angus He was the son of James Ross, architect. The family moved to Inverness in 1838. Alexander was educated at Inverness Royal Academy and Dr Bell's Institution. In 1848, he was briefly apprenticed to a stonemason to gain some practical experience before being articled in his father's architect's office. When his father died in 1853, he took over the office.

Ross & Joass was created in 1859, when Ross took William Joass into partnership, . In the same year he became a volunteer in the Inverness Garrison Artillery (later rising to Colonel) and joined the St John Lodge of the Inverness Freemasons.

Ross & Joass was dissolved in 1865 and Joass set up in Dingwall.

In 1866 he secured a major commission to design St Andrew's Cathedral in Inverness. This led to his nomination in 1872 for St Mary's Episcopal Cathedral, Edinburgh. He entered his three-spired design under the pseudonym "Fidelitas". However, this ended in a complicated legal dispute: George Gilbert Scott won the competition by one vote, but his design was for a complicated and expensive single spire design. The commissioning body asked for the design to be changed closer to Ross's design: Ross naturally objected. But Ross's design was then claimed to be that of George Freeth Roper who had undertaken the building of Ross's St Andrew's Cathedral in Inverness. It was messy, and did some reputational damage, but also gained him some fame as a designer.

He was Master of his lodge in Inverness 1873 to 1876.

He had a strong reputation for designing church-run schools, and after the Education Act of 1872 he received at least 450 small commissions to create the numerous small parish schools required in the Act. He opened a branch office in Oban in 1880 to cope with the work. This office was run by his new partner David Mackintosh. The partnership was dissolved in 1883 when the school commissions were exhausted. In 1887 he entered a third (and final) partnership with Robert John MacBeth to create Ross & MacBeth.

In 1891 St Andrews University awarded him an honorary doctorate (LLD).

He had little practical involvement in design beyond around 1910 and retired completely in 1917 aged 83.

He died at home, "Riverfield", in Inverness on 19 May 1925 aged 90. The funeral service took place in his own building, St Andrew's Cathedral. He was buried at Tomnahurich with full masonic rites.

== Other roles ==
- Grand Master Mason for Inverness 1873 to 1876
- Local politician, joining the town council in 1881 and rising to be Provost of Inverness 1889 to 1895
- President of the Inverness Architectural Association
- Director of the Northern Infirmary, Inverness
- Director of the Inverness College
- Director of the Caledonian Bank
- Director of the Lancashire Assurance Company
- Director of Inverness Tweed Mills
- Main share-holder of the Rose Street Foundry in Inverness
- Founder of the Inverness Scientific Society and Field Club
- Founder of the Gaelic Society of Inverness
- Noted amateur geologist and antiquarian

== Family ==
In 1864 or 1865, he married Mary Ann Carnaby Finlayson.

His son was a Major in the Royal Artillery in the First World War.

His son John Alistair Ross became an architect and took over his office.

== Artistic recognition ==
He was portrayed in his Provost robes by George Reid RSA.

== Principal works ==
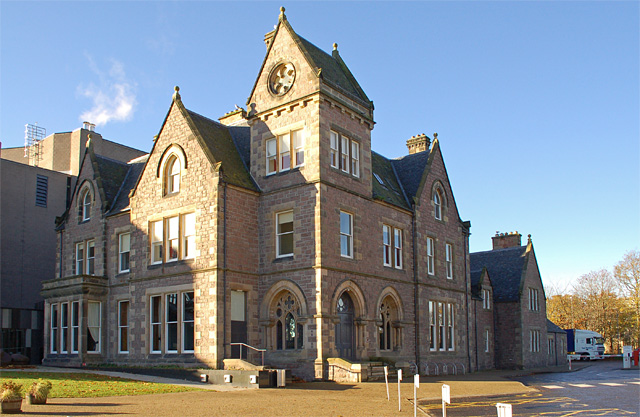
The Bishop's Palace, Inverness (Eden Court)

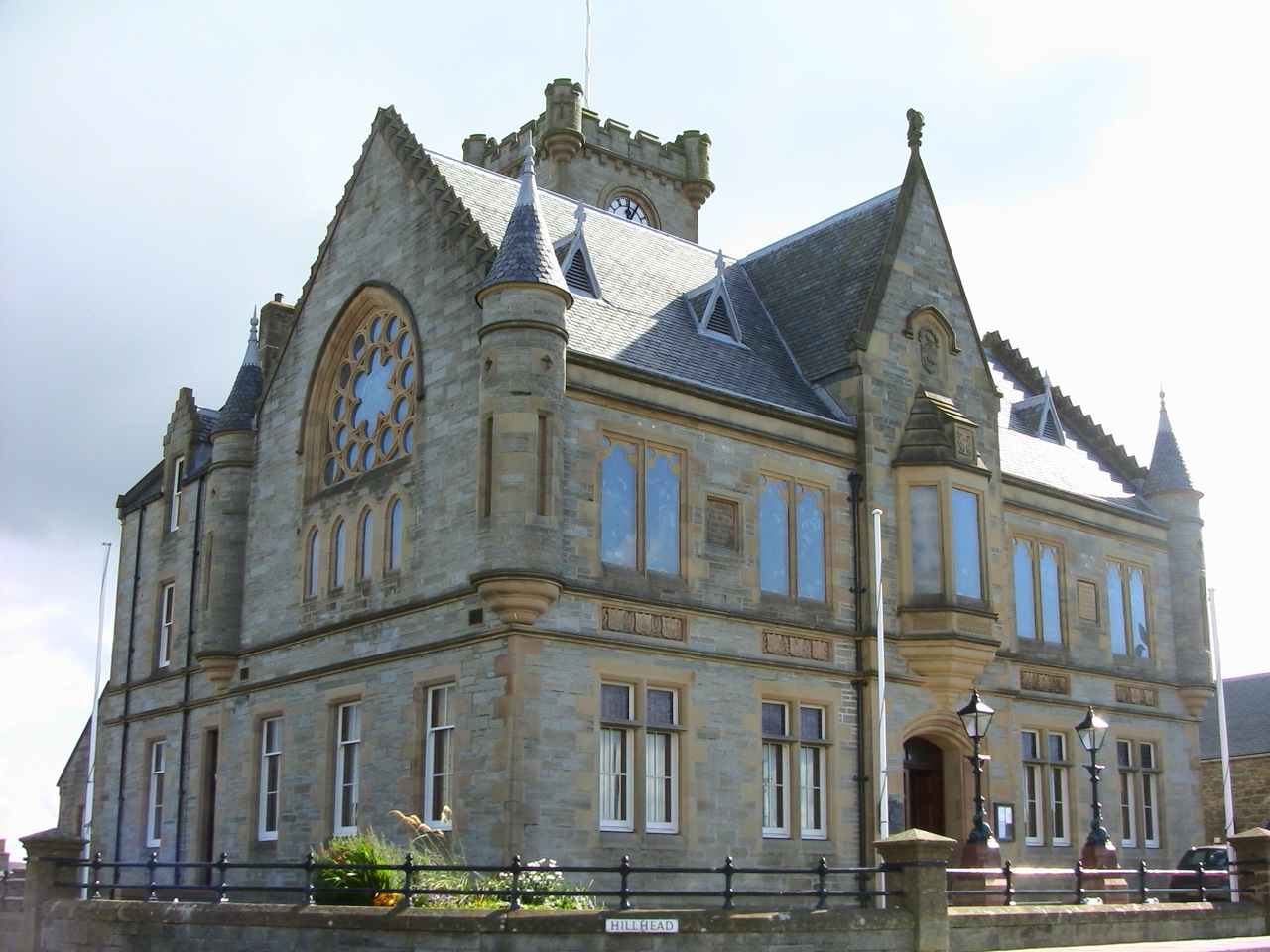
Lerwick Town Hall

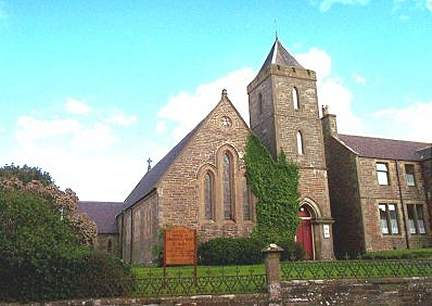
St Olaf's Episcopal Church, Kirkwall

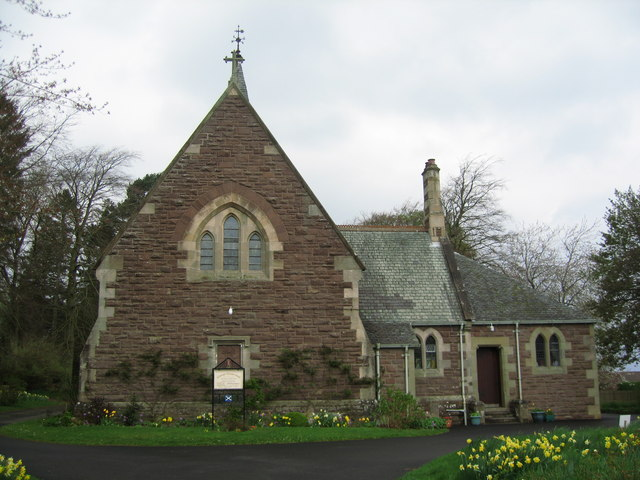
St Kessog's Church, Auchterarder

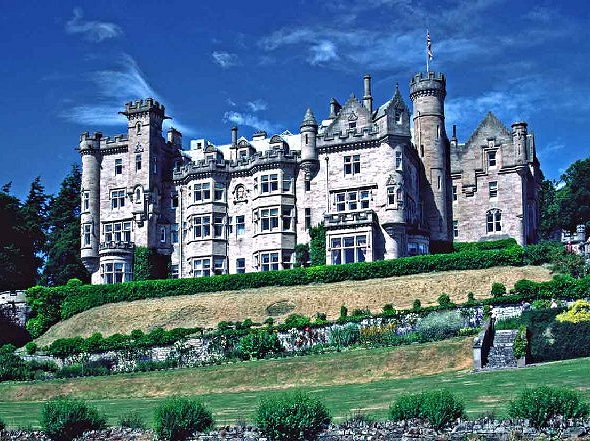
Skibo Castle

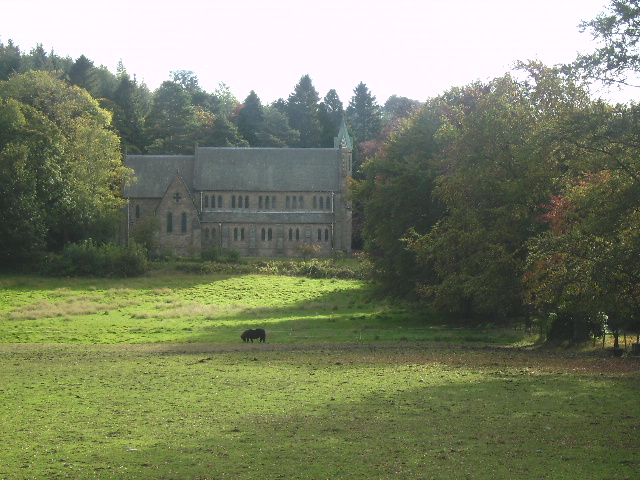
Saint Margaret's Episcopal Church, Aberlour

- Ardochy House (date not known)
- UP church, Aros (dnk)
- Bishop of Argyll's house, Ballachulish (dnk)
- Alterations to Brahan Castle (dnk)
- Remodelling of Caledonian Bank, Inverness (dnk)
- Remodelling of Culloden House (dnk)
- Glencarron Lodge (dnk)
- Glendye Lodge (dnk)
- Glenfintaig House, Kilmonivaig (dnk)
- Glenforsa House, Gruline, Mull (dnk)
- The Hippodrome, Southend-on-Sea (dnk)
- Fortrose Hydropathic Establishment (dnk)
- Remodelling of Kintail Parish Church (dnk)
- Laisdale House, Skye (dnk)
- Leckmelm House near Ullapool (dnk)
- Lerwick Cottage Hospital (dnk)
- Remodelling of Leys Castle (dnk)
- Lochaber Church (dnk)
- Paisley Mission Church (dnk)
- Royal Insurance Buildings, Inverness (dnk)
- Torlandig House (dnk)
- Wick Free Church (dnk)
- Geddes Mills, Avoch (1853)
- St Ninian's Episcopal Church, Kintail (1853)
- Ballachulish Episcopal School (1854)
- St Finan's Episcopal Church, Kinlochmoidart (1854)
- Caminsky (1855)
- Ardersier Free Church (1856)
- Croy Free Church manse (1856)
- St Columba's Episcopal Church, Nairn (1857)
- St Saviour's Episcopal Church, Bridge of Allan (1857)
- Invergordon Free Church (1859)
- Stratherrick RC Church, Dalcraig (1859)
- Findon School, schoolhouse and boathouse (1860)
- Kilmonivaig School (1860)
- Kilmuir Free Church and manse, Skye (1860)
- Uig Established Church, Skye (1860)
- Church of St Droslain, Aberlour (1861)
- Alness Church (1862)
- Urray Church and manse (1862)
- Conaglen House, Ardgour, Fort William (1862)
- Reid School, Dingwall (1863)
- St Matthew's Episcopal Church, Old Meldrum (1863)
- Union St UP Church, Inverness (1863)
- Glenshiel Free Church (1864)
- Mackenzie Foundation Episcopal School, Avoch (1864)
- Nairnside School (1864)
- Bank of Scotland, Nairn (1864)
- Navidale House (1864)
- St Clement's School, Dingwall (1864)
- UP church, Queen Street, Inverness (1864)
- Caledonian Bank, Bonar Bridge (1865)
- Glengarry Established Church (1865)
- St Andrew's Cathedral, Inverness (1866)
- Duncraig Castle (1866)
- Dunvegan Hotel, Skye (1868)
- St Andrew's Episcopal Church, Wick, Caithness (1868)
- Flora MacDonald Monument, Kilmuir Cemetery, Skye (1870)
- Achnasheen Station Hotel (1871)
- Inverness Artillery Drill Hall (1871)
- Laurencekirk Episcopal Church (1871)
- Nigg UP Church (1871)
- Applecross School (1872)
- Avoch Free Church (1872)
- Remodelling of Rosehaugh House (1872)
- St Columba's Episcopal Church, Isle of Mull (1872)
- St Cyprian's Episcopal Church, Lenzie (1872)
- Aberarder House (1873)
- Caledonian Bank, Lochcarron (1873)
- Invergordon Castle (1873)
- All Saints Episcopal Church, Buckie (1875)
- Bishop's Palace, Inverness (1875) now known as Eden Court
- St Margaret's Episcopal Church, Aberlour (1875)
- St Olaf's Episcopal Church, Kirkwall (1875)
- Episcopal Church of St Columba, Largs (1876)
- Aberlour Orphanage (1876)
- Inverness Tweed Mill (1877)
- Jura House (1878)
- Trinity UP Church, Banff (1879)
- Remodelling of Ardross Castle (1880)
- St Mary's Episcopal Church, Glencoe (1880)
- St Michael's Episcopal Church, Dufftown (1880)
- Duncansburgh Parish Church, Fort William (1881)
- Lerwick Town Hall (1881)
- Holy Trinity episcopal Church, Keith (1882)
- Invermoidart House, Moidart (1882)
- Remodelling of Portee Old Parish Church (1883)
- St Peter and the Holy Rood Episcopal Church, Thurso (1883)
- Halkirk Free Church (1884)
- St Columba Episcopal Church, Portree (1884)
- Ardtornish House (1885)
- Chapel of the Holy Spirit, Inverness (1886)
- Mission Church, Inverness (1886)
- Tobacco Factory, Inverness (1886)
- St Andrew's Episcopal Church, Tain (1887)
- Rebuilding of the Caledonian Hotel, Inverness (1887)
- Ledgowan House Achnasheen (1888)
- Bridge over River Aline, Ardtornish (1888)
- St Andrew's Episcopal Church, Brechin (1888)
- Inverness Artillery Volunteer Hall (1889)
- Mission Hall, Dornie (1889)
- St Columba's Mission Hall, Inverness (1889)
- Swimming Baths and public laundry, Inverness (1889)
- Restoration of Kinlochaline Castle (1890)
- Caledonian Bank, Dornoch (1890)
- Caledonian Bank, Burghead (1890)
- Episcopal Mission Church, Inverness (1890)
- Free North Church, Inverness (1890)
- Restoration of Kilcoy Castle (1890)
- Palace Hotel, Inverness (1890)
- Telford Street Tweed Mill, Inverness (1890)
- Restoration of Killearnan Parish Church and new manse (1891)
- Stromeferry Free Church Mission Hall
- St Bride's Episcopal Church, Onich (1891)
- Castlebay Police Station, Barra (1892)
- Nairn Convalescent Home (1892)
- Cromdale Parish Church (1892)
- Dunvegan Police Station (1892)
- Flodigarry House, Skye (1892)
- Golf Clubhouse, Nairn (1892)
- St Columba's Episcopal Church, Grantown-on-Spey (1892)
- Tarbert Police Station (1892)
- Campbelltown Police Station (1893)
- Fort Augustus Police Station (1893)
- Total rebuilding of Inverness Royal Academy (1893–1895) his alma mater
- St Columba's Chapel and Bishop's House, Iona (1893)
- Remodelling of Ferintosh Parish Church (1894)
- Dochfour Memorial Church (1894)
- St Drostan's Episcopal Church, Insch (1894)
- Remodelling of Urquhart Parish Church (1894)
- Caledonian Bank, Glenurquhart (1895)
- Shieldaig Free Presbyterian Church (1895)
- St Barnabas Episcopal Church, Paisley (1895)
- Clydebank Episcopal Church (1895)
- Gairloch Free Presbyterian Church (1896)
- Struy Free Church (1896)
- Ardersier Police Station (1897)
- St Kessog's Episcopal Church, Auchterarder (1897)
- Ardross Church (1898)
- Free Presbyterian Church, Raasay (1898)
- Aviemore Station Hotel (1899)
- Cumming Street UF Church, Forres (1899)
- Remodelling of Duncraig Castle (1899)
- Free Presbyterian Church, Inverness (1899)
- Music Hall, Inverness (1899)
- Major upgrade of Skibo Castle (1899) a major commission from Andrew Carnegie who had just acquired Skibo
- Boat of Garten Police Station (1900)
- Nethybridge Police Station (1900)
- Courthill Episcopal Chapel, Lochcarron (1901)
- Dunbeg House, Ballachulish (1902)
- Hugh Miller Institute, Cromarty (1902)
- Mallaig Police Station (1902)
- Caledonian Bank, Fort Augustus (1903)
- Kingussie Episcopal Chapel (1903)
- St Michael and All Angels Episcopal Church, Inverness (1903)
- Fort William Masonic Lodge (1903)
- Inverness Sailors Home (1904)
- Auchterarder Church (1906)
- Seaforth Sanatorium, Dingwall (1906)
- St Regulus Episcopal Church, Cromarty (1906)
- Latheron UF Church (1909)
- Riding School, Inverness (1909)
- Skating Rink, Inverness (1909)
- St Finnbar's Episcopal Church, Dornoch (1912)
- La Scala Cinema, Inverness (1913)
- Territorial Army Drill Hall, Fort Augustus (1913)
- Territorial Army Drill Hall, Broadford, Skye (1914)
- Conversion of distillery building to a US Naval Base, Dalmore Distillery (1917)
- Conversion of distillery building to a US Naval Base, Glenalbyn Distillery (1917)
