= Sir Kenneth Mackenzie, 6th Baronet =

British diplomat (1832–1900)

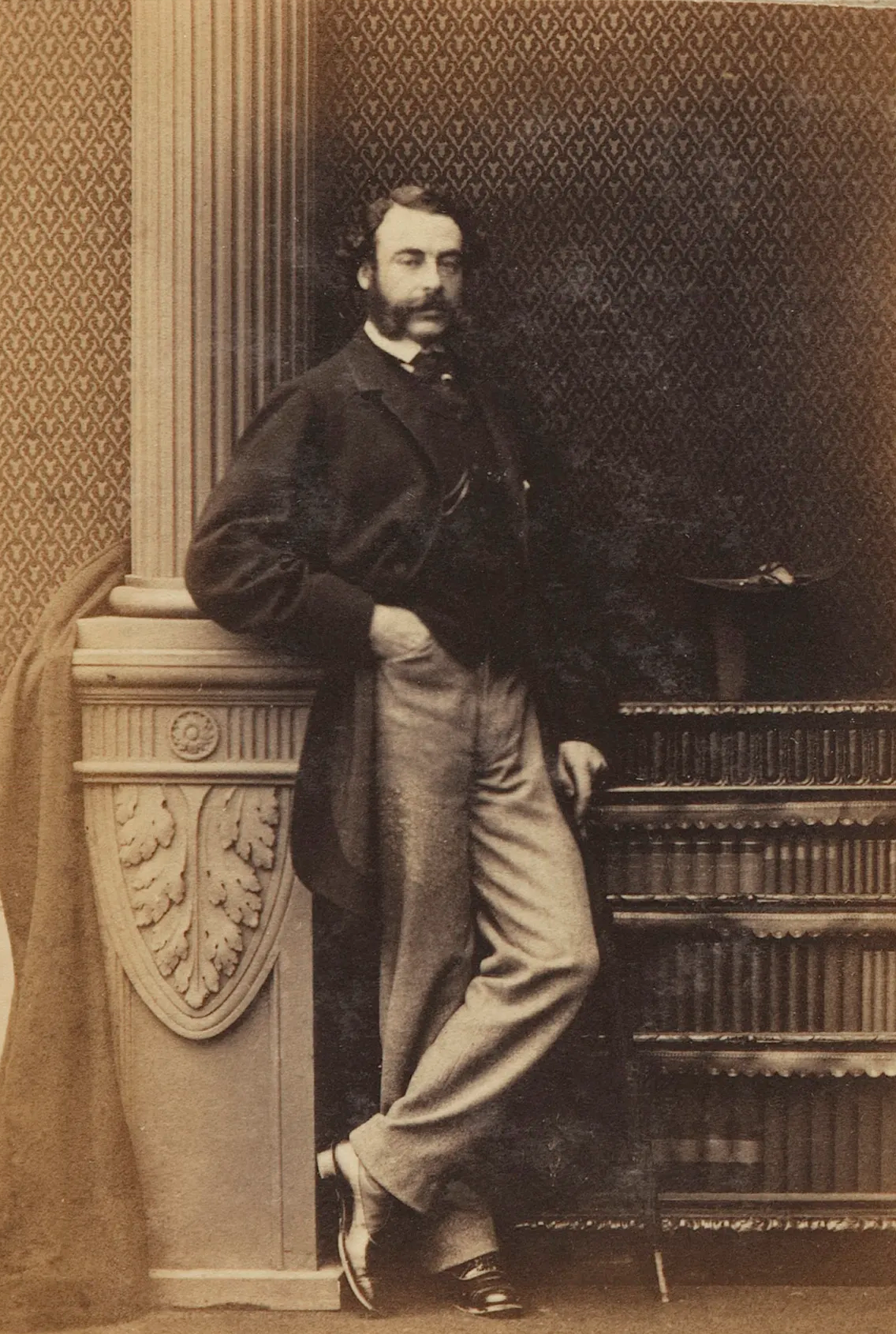
Portrait by Camille Silvy, 1860

Sir Kenneth Smith Mackenzie, 6th Baronet (25 May 1832 – 9 February 1900) was a British diplomat, landowner and Lord Lieutenant of Ross and Cromarty 1881-1899.

== Biography ==
Mackenzie was the son of Sir Francis Mackenzie, 5th Baronet, and a descendant of the Lords Mackenzie of Kintail. He succeeded his father in 1843, and became 6th baronet and the 13th feudal baron of Gairloch. He was the hereditary owner of 170,000 acres of land in Ross-shire.

He entered the diplomatic service, and was appointed an attaché at Washington in 1854.

He served in the part-time Highland Rifle Militia as a captain from 1861 and major from 1871.

He was appointed Lord Lieutenant of Ross-shire in 1881, and continued when that office was replaced by the Lord Lieutenant of Ross and Cromarty in 1891 through the operation of the Local Government (Scotland) Act 1889. He served on the Napier Commission on the Condition of the Crofters and Cottars in the Highlands and Islands of Scotland in 1883 and 1884, and was a Commissioner of the Congested Districts Board (Scotland) from 1897 until his death. He was chairman of the Ross-shire County Council from 1889. He was also a promoter of the Loch Maree and Aultbea Railway.

Mackenzie died at his residence Conan House, Ross-shire on 9 February 1900.

== Family ==
Mackenzie married, in 1860, Eila Frederica Campbell, daughter of Walter Frederick Campbell, of Islay. Their son Kenneth Mackenzie succeeded to the baronetcy.

Honorary titles
Preceded by Duncan Davidson	Lord Lieutenant of Ross-shire; 1881–1891	Office abolished
New title	Lord Lieutenant of Ross and Cromarty; 1891–1899	Succeeded by Sir Hector Munro, Bt
Baronetage of Nova Scotia
Preceded by Francis Mackenzie	Baronet (of Gairloch); 1843–1900	Succeeded by Kenneth Mackenzie
