= Roderick Macleod of Cadboll =

Roderick Macleod of Cadboll may refer to:

- Roderick Macleod, 2nd of Cadboll (died 1770), Scotsman who fought for Bonnie Prince Charlie
- Roderick Macleod, 4th of Cadboll (1786–1853), Scottish Whig politician
