= Mackenzie baronets of Tarbat (1628) =

Escutcheon of the Mackenzie baronets of Tarbat

The Mackenzie Baronetcy, of Tarbat in the County of Ross, was created in the Baronetage of Nova Scotia on 21 May 1628 for John Mackenzie. His son, the 2nd Baronet, was created Earl of Cromarty in 1703; he resigned the baronetcy in favour of his younger son Kenneth, who was created a baronet in the Baronetage of Nova Scotia on 29 April 1704, with remainder to his heirs male whatsoever and with the precedence of 1628. The 3rd Baronet was one of the Scottish representatives to the 1st Parliament of Great Britain and later represented Cromartyshire. The 4th Baronet was Member of Parliament for Cromartyshire. In 1744 he succeeded to the Mackenzie baronetcy of Roystoun on the death of his uncle Sir James Mackenzie, 1st Baronet, of Roystoun.

On the death of the 5th/3rd Baronet in 1763, the next heir George Mackenzie, 3rd Earl of Cromartie was under attainder, a death sentence of 1746 for participation in the 1745 Jacobite uprising not having been carried out. The baronetcies were consequently forfeited.

== Mackenzie baronets, of Tarbat (1628/1704) ==
- Sir John Mackenzie, 1st Baronet (died 1654)
- George Mackenzie, 1st Earl of Cromartie, 2nd Baronet (1630–1714); created Earl of Cromarty in 1703, and resigned the baronetcy in 1704 in favour of the 3rd Baronet.
- Sir Kenneth Mackenzie, 3rd Baronet (c. 1658–1728)
- Sir George Mackenzie, 4th Baronet (died 1748)
- Sir Kenneth Mackenzie, 5th Baronet (died 1763)
