= Robert Bruce Aeneas Macleod =

Scottish lord lieutenant (1764–1844)

Robert Bruce Aeneas Macleod (23 January 1764 – 6 December 1844), 3rd Macleod of Cadboll, was Lord Lieutenant of Cromarty from 1794 until 1833, and, a staunch Tory, he sat as the Member of Parliament (M.P.) for Cromartyshire from 1807 to 1812.

== Biography ==
Macleod was born on 23 January 1764, the only son of Roderick Macleod, 2nd of Cadboll (d 1770) and Lilias, daughter of William Mackenzie of Belmaduthy. (Note: Roderick Macleod (died 1770) was the son of Aeneas Macleod and Margaret, eldest daughter of Sir Kenneth Mackenzie, 1st Baronet and 4th of Scatwell. Roderick fought for Bonnie Prince Charlie in The 'Forty-Five', but the family estate was not confiscated on understanding that he went into exile for a time. He registered arms with the Lord Lyon c. 1730. In 1751 Roderick Macleod married his cousin Lilias they had two children Margaret, and the subject of this biography, Robert Bruce Aeneas (Roderick heir and successor) (National Archive of Scotland staff 2012).) He may have been educated at Eaton School from 1777 until 1779, He may have been at Glasgow University in 1780 and may have been an advocate by 1789.

He succeed to his father's estate of Cadboll in Ross-shire, north west of Tain, when he six, and his trustees purchased Invergordon Castle for him around 1780.

Macleod was a Captain in the Sutherland Fencibles (1793) and a Major in the Ross Militia of 1803. He was Lord Lieutenant of Cromarty from 1794 until 1833, and, a staunch Tory, he sat as the Member of Parliament (M.P.) for Cromartyshire from 1807 to 1812. Macleod died on 6 December 1844 and was succeeded by his son and heir Roderick.

== Family ==
On 27 July 1784 Macleod married Elizabeth, daughter of Captain Alexander Macleod of Harris and 4th of Bernera. Their children were Roderick, Macleod' heir and successor, Sophia, and Elizabeth Letitia.

== Notes ==
Parliament of the United Kingdom
Vacant alternating constituency Title last held by Alexander Mackenzie	Member of Parliament for Cromartyshire; 1807 – 1812	Vacant alternating constituency Title next held by Roderick Macleod
