= Roderick Macleod =

Roderick Macleod or MacLeod may refer to:

- Old Rory (Roderick Macleod, c. 1500 – c. 1595), chief of Clan MacLeod of Lewis
- Sir Roderick MacLeod of MacLeod (1559 or 1573 – 1626), 15th chief of Clan Macleod
- Roderick Macleod, 2nd of Cadboll (died 1770), Scottish Jacobite and rebel
- Roderick Macleod (physician) (died 1852), Scottish physician
- Roderick Macleod, 4th of Cadboll (1786–1853), Scottish politician
- Roderick Macleod (Alberta politician) (1908–2004), provincial level politician from Alberta, Canada
- Roderick John MacLeod, Lord Minginish (born c. 1953), Scottish lawyer, chairman of the Scottish Land Court since 2014
- Roderick MacLeod (minister) (1754–1815), principal of King's College, Aberdeen, 1800–1815
- Roddy MacLeod (born 1962), Scottish bagpipe player
- Roderick “Rory” MacLeod (1955–2025), bass with band Roomful of Blues

== See also ==
- Roderick McLeod (disambiguation)
