= Duncan Davidson =

Duncan Davidson may refer to:

- Duncan Davidson (Cromartyshire MP, born 1733) (1733–1799), Scottish merchant and Member of Parliament
- Duncan Davidson (Cromartyshire MP, born 1800) (1800–1881), Scottish landowner and Member of Parliament, grandson of the above
- Duncan Davidson (businessman) (1941–2025), British businessman, founder of Persimmon plc
- Duncan Davidson (footballer) (born 1954), Scottish footballer
