= Tulloch Castle =

Castle in Highland, Scotland

Coordinates: 57°36′34″N 4°26′01″W

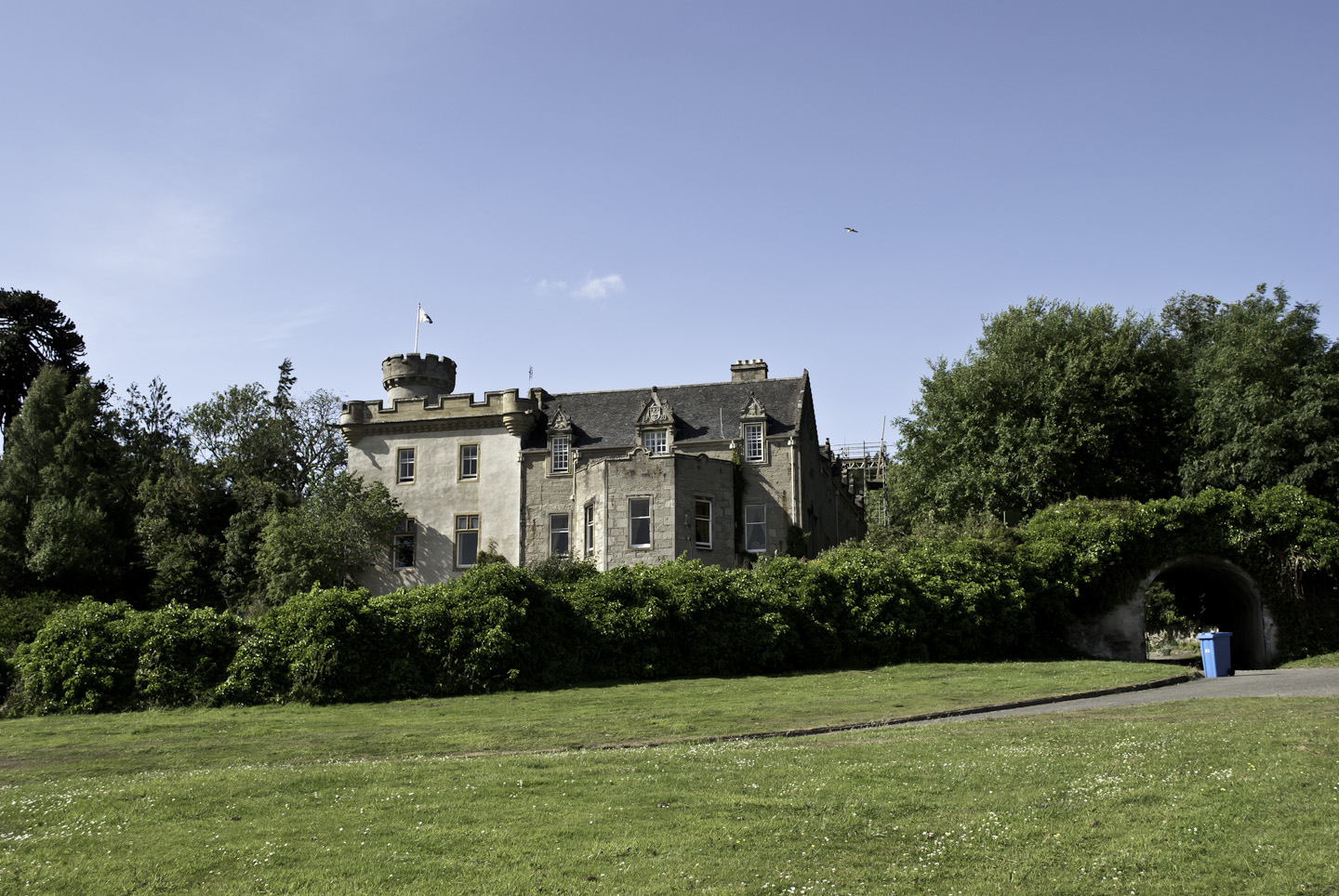
Tulloch Castle

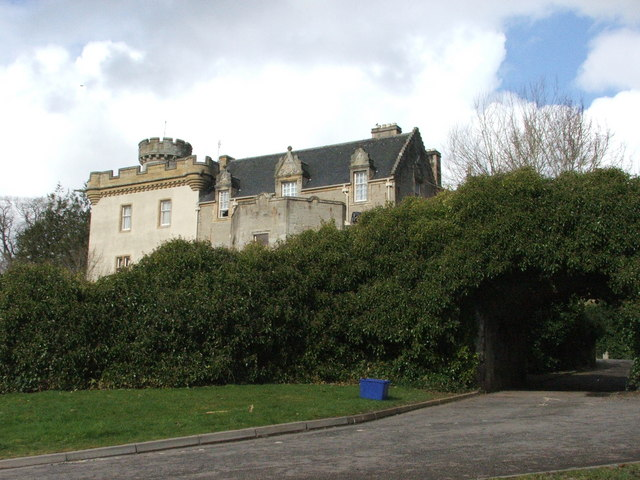
Tulloch Castle

Tulloch Castle is located in the town of Dingwall in the Highlands of Scotland. It dates at least to the late 14th century as the birthplace of Mariota Leslie, daughter of Euphemia I, countess of Ross. Mariota was the wife of Donald Macdonald, Lord of the Isles. Several of Euphemia's children by Walter Leslie were born at Tulloch Castle.

Over the years, the castle has served as a family home for members of the Bain of Tulloch family, Clan Davidson, and Vickers family. The castle was used as a hospital after the evacuation of Dunkirk, and then as a hostel for the local education authority. It is currently used as a hotel and conference centre.

== History ==
Tulloch Castle likely dates to at least the late 14th century. In the mid 16th century, Duncan Bane (Bain, Bayne) was granted a charter of lands (1542). The lands of Tulloch were erected into a free barony by King Charles II in favour of Sir Donald Bain of Tulloch in 1678.

In the 18th century however, ownership of the castle changed hands. Kenneth Bayne, 8th laird and 5th baron of Tulloch, sold the estate to his cousin, Henry Davidson, in 1762 (Crown Charter by King George III in favour of Henry Davidson, 6th baron of Tulloch, dated 23 February 1763). On Henry's death in 1781 Tulloch was inherited by his younger brother Duncan Davidson, who was MP for Cromartyshire from 1790 to 1796. He was in turn succeeded by his son Henry (1771–1827), grandson Duncan (1800–1881) and great-grandson Duncan Henry Caithness Reay Davidson (1836–1889), who was the father of the last Davidson of Tulloch, Duncan (1865–1917). The castle was damaged by fire in 1845, and extended in 1891.

The castle passed out of Davidson ownership in 1917 when Duncan Davidson, 11th baron of Tulloch, died and left the castle and the barony to his daughter and her son, Colonel Angus Vickers, of the Vickers aircraft company. Architect Sir Robert Lorimer designed alterations in the early 1920s. After serving as the Vickers' family home for several years, and as a hospital for casualties of Dunkirk in 1940, Tulloch Castle was purchased by the local education authority in 1957. It was used as a hostel for students from the west coast of Scotland who were studying at Dingwall Academy until 1976. After this, the castle fell into disrepair until it was renovated and converted into a hotel by local family, the MacAulays, in 1996. It remains in use as a hotel and conference centre, and played host to the official Clan Davidson Gathering in October 2007. It is a category B listed building. When Colonel Angus Vickers, 13th baron of Tulloch, died in 1990, his niece Lady Phyllis Vickers inherited the barony by way of disposition.

In 2016, the previous baron of Tulloch, Sir Francis Henry Mackay of Tulloch, sold the barony to David Willien. Willien owns both the caput baroneum (Brick House Land) and the separate titular barony of Tulloch.

== Supernatural reports ==
Tulloch castle is said to be haunted by a green lady and other ghosts. These supernatural claims were explored in the Grampian Television series Beyond Explanation in 2005. On 28 May 2008 it was reported that a 14-year-old boy named Connor Bond apparently took a photograph (with a digital camera) of a "hand" holding on to the stair railing with an apparition floating behind it.

== The grounds and estate ==
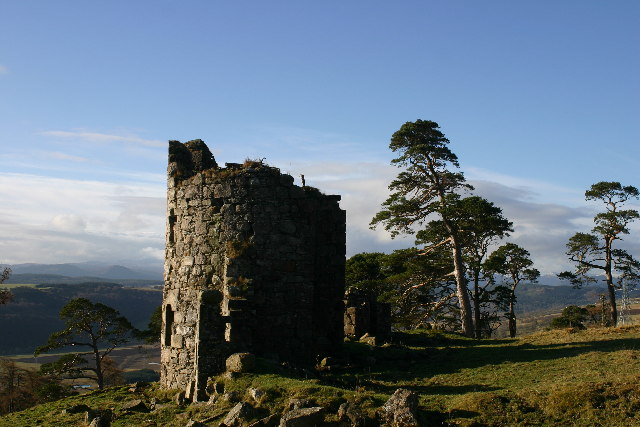
Caisteal Gorach

A tunnel runs from the basement of the castle under the town of Dingwall to the old site of Dingwall Castle. The tunnel has now collapsed, but it is possible to view this passageway through an air vent (now closed off)on the front lawn of the castle’s grounds. There is a Davidson cemetery in the grounds of the castle for family members and pets. The graveyard is surrounded by a metal fence and has become overgrown, though some of its headstones are still visible. Originally, there were two walled gardens on either side of the castle. These are now overgrown and parts of them have become woods or have had houses built on them. The castle had two gatehouses and entrance paths. The former west gatehouse was situated at the foot of what is now Maggie's Drive and can be seen on old postcards of Dingwall and also OS maps from the late nineteenth and early twentieth century. Though the west gatehouse no longer exists the east gatehouse has survived and is currently a privately owned house. This gatehouse was built in 1876 and the path which connects it to the castle has become a public road. This road is still used as the main entrance to the castle today.

On a hill to the north of the castle stands "Caisteal Gorach", a late 18th-century folly which was designed by Robert Adam for Duncan Davidson of Tulloch. The folly comprises a ruined round tower and flanking walls, and is a category A listed building.
