= Roderick Stirling of Fairburn =

Captain Sir Roderick William Kenneth Stirling of Fairburn, KCVO, TD (1932–2007) was a Scottish landowner, local politician and company director.

Born on 17 June 1932, Stirling's father was the Scottish soldier and politician Sir John Stirling.

After completing National Service with the Scots Guards in 1952, Stirling was commissioned as an officer in the Territorial Army, serving until 1969. He also studied agriculture at the University of Aberdeen and, after graduating, went to manage his family's estate at Urray, Muir of Ord, in 1960; as The Times summarised, he "personified the old tradition of the Highland laird who combines the privilege of land ownership with a strong obligation of public service". Stirling also held directorships in the Moray Firth Salmon Fishing Company and the Scottish Salmon and Whitefish Company, chairing the latter from 1980 to 1991.

In 1970, he was elected onto Ross and Cromarty County Council, serving until the council's abolition four years later. He was also a member of Cromarty District Council from 1984 to 1996. In 1988, he was appointed Lord Lieutenant of Ross and Cromarty, serving until his death on 24 March 2007.

Stirling had been appointed a Knight Commander of the Royal Victorian Order in 2007.
