= Mackenzie baronets of Scatwell (1703) =

The Mackenzie baronetcy, of Scatwell in the County of Ross, was created in the Baronetage of Nova Scotia on 22 February 1703 for Kenneth Mackenzie, who represented Ross-shire in the Scottish Parliament. He was a descendant of Kenneth Mackenzie, brother of the 1st Baronet of the 1628 creation. The 5th Baronet represented Ross-shire in the British Parliament and was Lord Lieutenant of Ross-shire.

The presumed 10th and 11th Baronets did not prove their succession. The baronetcy as of 2026 is considered dormant.

The Mackenzie baronets of Tarbat were a collateral branch of the Mackenzie Earls of Cromartie and the present Baronet has claimed he is the representative as heir male collateral of Sir John Mackenzie, 1st Baronet of Tarbat.

== Mackenzie baronets, of Scatwell (1703) ==
- Sir Kenneth Mackenzie, 1st Baronet (died 1730)
- Sir Roderick Mackenzie, 2nd Baronet (c. 1687–1750)
- Sir Lewis Mackenzie, 3rd Baronet (1715–1756)
- Sir Roderick Mackenzie, 4th Baronet (c. 1740–1811)
- Sir James Wemyss Mackenzie, 5th Baronet (1770–1843)
- Sir James John Randoll Mackenzie, 6th Baronet (1814–1884)
- Sir James Dixon Mackenzie, 7th Baronet (1830–1900)
- Sir James Kenneth Douglas Mackenzie, 8th Baronet (1859–1930)
- Sir Lewis Roderick Kenneth Mackenzie, 9th Baronet (1902–1972)
- Roderick Campbell Mackenzie, presumed 10th Baronet (1954–1981)
- Roderick Edward Francois McQuhae Mackenzie, presumed 11th Baronet (1894–1986)
- Roderick McQuhae Mackenzie, presumed 12th Baronet (born 1942), pediatrician. Not on the Official Roll.
