= John Stirling (Scottish politician) =

Sir John Stirling KT MBE TD

Personal details
- Born: 16 September 1893
- Died: 21 March 1975 (aged 81)

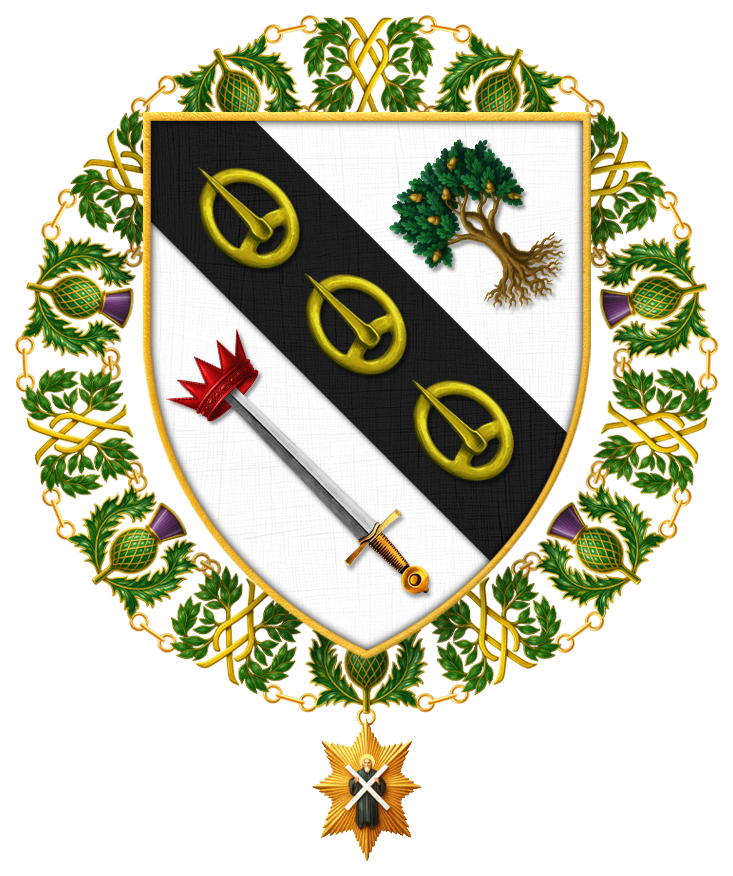
Shield of Arms of Sir John Stirling, KT, MBE, TD

Sir John Stirling (16 September 1893 – 21 March 1975) was a Scottish soldier and politician.

The eldest son of William Stirling of Fairburn, he was educated at Harrow School and at Magdalen College, Oxford. He served with the Lovat Scouts from 1914 to 1935, and was awarded the MBE in 1919.

He was a Member of Ross and Cromarty County Council from 1919 to 1970, serving as Convener from 1935 to 1961. He was a Forestry Commissioner from 1948 to 1962, and Chairman of the commission's Scottish National Committee from 1950 to 1959.

He was appointed a Knight of the Thistle in 1956 and served as Lord Lieutenant of Ross and Cromarty from 1964 to 1968.

He married Marjorie Kythe Mackenzie, daughter of Sir Kenneth Mackenzie, 7th Baronet, by whom he had three daughters and two sons, his eldest son John Michael (1925–1940) predeceasing him. His second son, Sir Roderick Stirling of Fairburn, would himself later serve as Lord Lieutenant.

Honorary titles
Preceded by Sir Richard O'Connor	Lord Lieutenant of Ross and Cromarty; 1964–1968	Succeeded by Alexander Francis Matheson
