= Mackenzie baronets =

Set index for Mackenzie baronets

There have been nine baronetcies created for persons with the surname Mackenzie, six in the Baronetage of Nova Scotia and three in the Baronetage of the United Kingdom. Four of the creations are extant as of 2026.

- Mackenzie baronets of Tarbat (1628)
- Mackenzie baronets of Coul (1673)
- Mackenzie baronets of Darien (1703)
- Mackenzie, later Inglis baronets, of Gairloch (1703): see Inglis baronets
- Mackenzie baronets of Scatwell (1703)
- Mackenzie baronets of Royston (1704)
- Baillie baronets of Berkeley Square (1819), later Mackenzie baronets: see Baillie baronets of Portman Square (1812)
- Mackenzie baronets of Kilcoy (1836)
- Mackenzie baronets of Glen Muick (1890)

== See also ==
- Muir-Mackenzie baronets
