= Sir Hector Munro, 11th Baronet =

Colonel Sir Hector Munro (13 September 1848–1935) was a Scottish chief and military officer. He was the 32nd Chief of the Scottish Highland Clan Munro, 29th Baron and 11th Baronet of Foulis.

== Biography ==
Sir Hector Munro was born on 13 September 1848 and was educated at the Academy and University of Edinburgh. He received his commission as Captain in the Highland Rifle Militia (which later became the 3rd (Militia) Battalion of the Seaforth Highlanders) on 31 January 1871. He was subsequently promoted to the rank of lieutenant-colonel on 25 March 1885. Following the outbreak of the Second Boer War in late 1899, many of the regular battalions of British regiments were sent to South Africa. Military service in other outpost of the British Empire were for several years filled by militia regiments, including the 3rd Seaforth Highlanders, which embarked for service in Egypt in February 1900, under the command of Sir Hector Munro.

Sir Hector Munro was Vice-Convener of the county of Ross and Cromarty, chairman of the Mid Ross District, in which his own estate was situated, for many years of the School Board of his parish and was Deputy Lieutenant and J.P for Ross-shire.

Sir Hector Munro was also an enthusiastic Freemason. He was for several years Master of the Fingal Lodge in Dingwall. In 1890 he became Provincial Grand Master of the Province of Ross and Cromarty.

Sir Hector was appointed an aide-de-camp to King Edward VII in the 1902 Coronation Honours list on 26 June 1902, with the regular rank of colonel. He served as such until the King´s death in 1910, and was re-appointed ADC to King George V from 1910. He was appointed Honorary Colonel of the 3rd Seaforths in 1908.

== Family ==
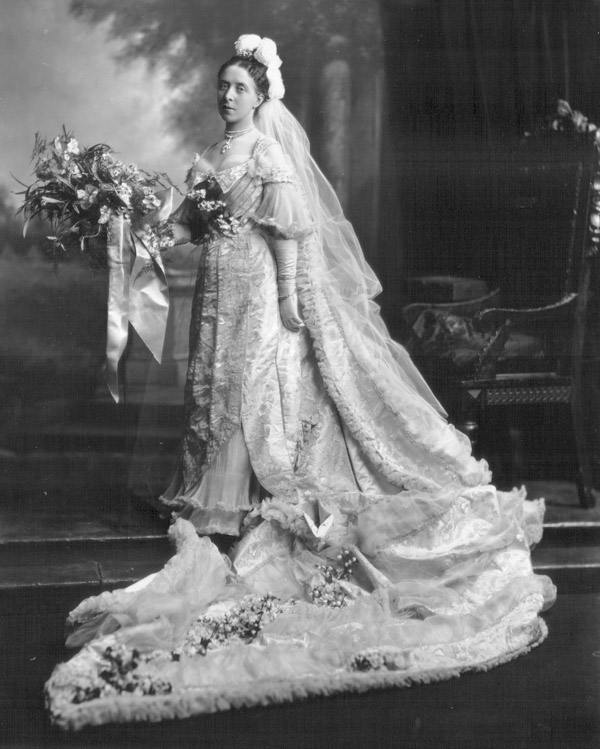
Lady Munro, née Margaret Violet Stirling, photographed on 16 May 1902.

Munro married on 7 April 1880, Margaret Violet, eldest daughter of John Stirling of Fairburn and 17 Ennismore Gardens, London.

They had six children:

1. Robert Ian Munro (died young)
2. Hector Charles Seymour Munro (died in World War I)
3. Eva Marion Munro (heiress to chieftaincy of Clan Munro but not to Baronetcy), married Col. C. H. Gascoigne. Their son, Patrick (1912–1995), took his mother's maiden name, Munro, in order to become chief of the clan. The current chief of the clan is Patrick's son, Hector William Munro of Foulis, Chief of Clan Munro (born 1950)
4. Isobel Euphane Munro
5. Violet Florence Munro
6. Aline Munro

== See also ==
- Munro Baronets
- Chiefs of Clan Munro

Honorary titles
| Preceded by Sir Kenneth Mackenzie | Lord Lieutenant of Ross and Cromarty; 1899–1935 | Succeeded by Sir Hector Mackenzie |
Baronetage of Nova Scotia
| Preceded by Charles Munro | Baronet (of Foulis); 1888–1935 | Succeeded by George Munro |
