= Alexander Mackenzie Fraser =

British Army general

Lieutenant-General Alexander Mackenzie Fraser
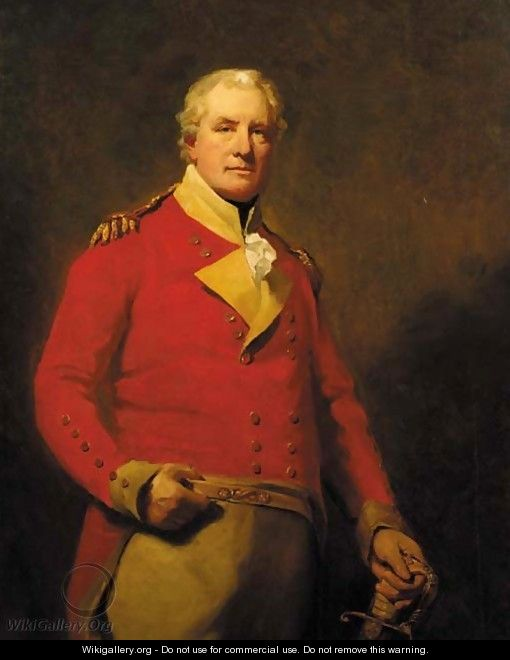
- Born: Alexander Mackenzie; 1758; Aberdeenshire, Scotland
- Died: 13 September 1809 (aged 50–51); Hayes, Kent, England
- Military career
- Allegiance: Kingdom of Great Britain; United Kingdom
- Branch: British Army
- Service years: 1778–1809
- Rank: Lieutenant-General
- Conflicts: American Revolutionary War; Napoleonic Wars; • Alexandria expedition of 1807

Lieutenant-General Alexander Mackenzie Fraser (born Alexander Mackenzie; 1758 – 13 September 1809) was a British General. He took the additional name of Fraser in 1803.

== Family and early life ==
The family of Fraser of Castle Fraser, in Aberdeenshire, Scotland are descended, on the female side, from the Honorable Sir Simon Fraser of Inverallochy, second son of Simon, eighth Lord Lovat, but on the male side their name is Mackenzie.

== Military service ==
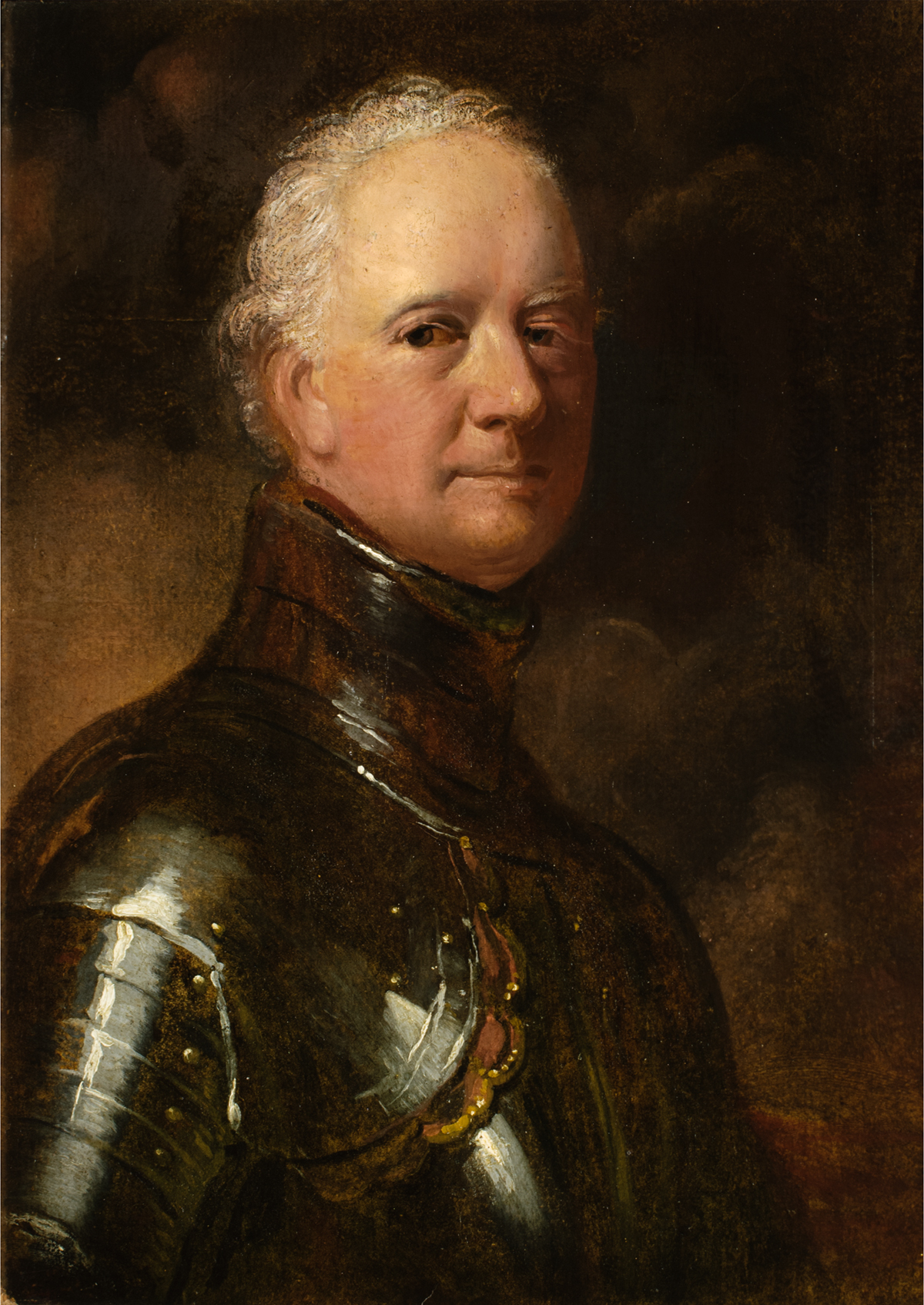
Alexander Mackenzie (1758–1809), 9th Lord Fraser of Inverallochy

Educated at Aberdeen University, he was commissioned into the 73rd Regiment of Foot in 1778. He distinguished himself at the Great Siege of Gibraltar. He later served during the American War of Independence where he was wounded, and serving during the British Campaign in Flanders where he temporarily commanded a brigade under Duke of York. He participated in the Cape of Good Hope expedition in 1795, and served in India from 1796 to 1800. From 1803 to 1805 he was assigned to the Home Staff, temporary commanding one of the infantry brigades (Hanoverian) of the King's German Legion in the Hanover Expedition in 1805. In 1806 he served under General James Henry Craig in the Anglo-Russian invasion of Naples during his service in Sicily.

He commanded the Alexandria expedition in 1807, invading Egypt on 16 March 1807 with 6,000 British troops. Mackenzie Fraser did first occupy Alexandria to secure the port as a base for Mediterranean operations and to prevent the French from making strategic use of it. Attempts to push inland, however, were not a success, with Fraser losing the two engagements at Rosetta (modern Rashid) on 29 March and 21 April, with two battalions suffering very heavy casualties, particularly in the later ambush. An agreement with Mohammed Ali for British troops to leave Egypt was finally signed on 19 September 1807.

After Egypt, he was given command of the 1st Division which was intended to be sent to aid Sweden in 1808 during the Russo-Swedish War in that year.

During the Peninsular War Mackenzie Fraser commanded the 3rd Division in Portugal and Spain during 1808–1809, and was present at the Battle of Corunna.

== Death ==
He again commanded a division during the Walcheren Campaign of 1809, dying at Hayes, Kent, from complications brought on by the illness he suffered there. In accordance with his wishes to be buried where he died he is buried at the church of St.Mary the Virgin in Hayes, Kent.

Military offices
Preceded by Francis Mackenzie, 1st Baron Seaforth	Colonel of the 78th (Highlanders) Regiment of Foot; 1796–1809	Succeeded by James Henry Craig
Parliament of the United Kingdom
Vacant alternating constituency Title last held by Duncan Davidson	Member of Parliament for Cromartyshire; 1802 – 1806	Vacant alternating constituency Title next held by Robert Bruce Aeneas Macleod
Preceded by Sir Charles Lockhart-Ross, Bt	Member of Parliament for Ross-shire; 1806–1809	Succeeded by Hugh Innes
