= Mackenzie baronets of Royston (1704) =

The Mackenzie baronetcy, of Royston in the County of Edinburgh, was created in the Baronetage of Nova Scotia on 8 February 1704 for James Mackenzie. He was a younger son of George Mackenzie, 1st Earl of Cromartie, and the brother of Sir Kenneth Mackenzie, 3rd Baronet, of Tarbat. On his death in 1744 the title was passed on to his nephew Sir George Mackenzie, 4th Baronet, of Tarbat, who became the 2nd Baronet. On the death of the 5th/3rd Baronet in 1763 the next heir was under attainder, and the baronetcies were forfeited.

== Mackenzie baronets, of Royston (1704) ==
- Sir James Mackenzie, 1st Baronet (c. 1671–1744)
- Sir George Mackenzie, 4th/2nd Baronet (died 1748)
- Sir Kenneth Mackenzie, 5th/3rd Baronet (died 1763)
