= Skibo Castle =

Castle in Scottish Highlands, Scotland

- Caisteal Sgìobail
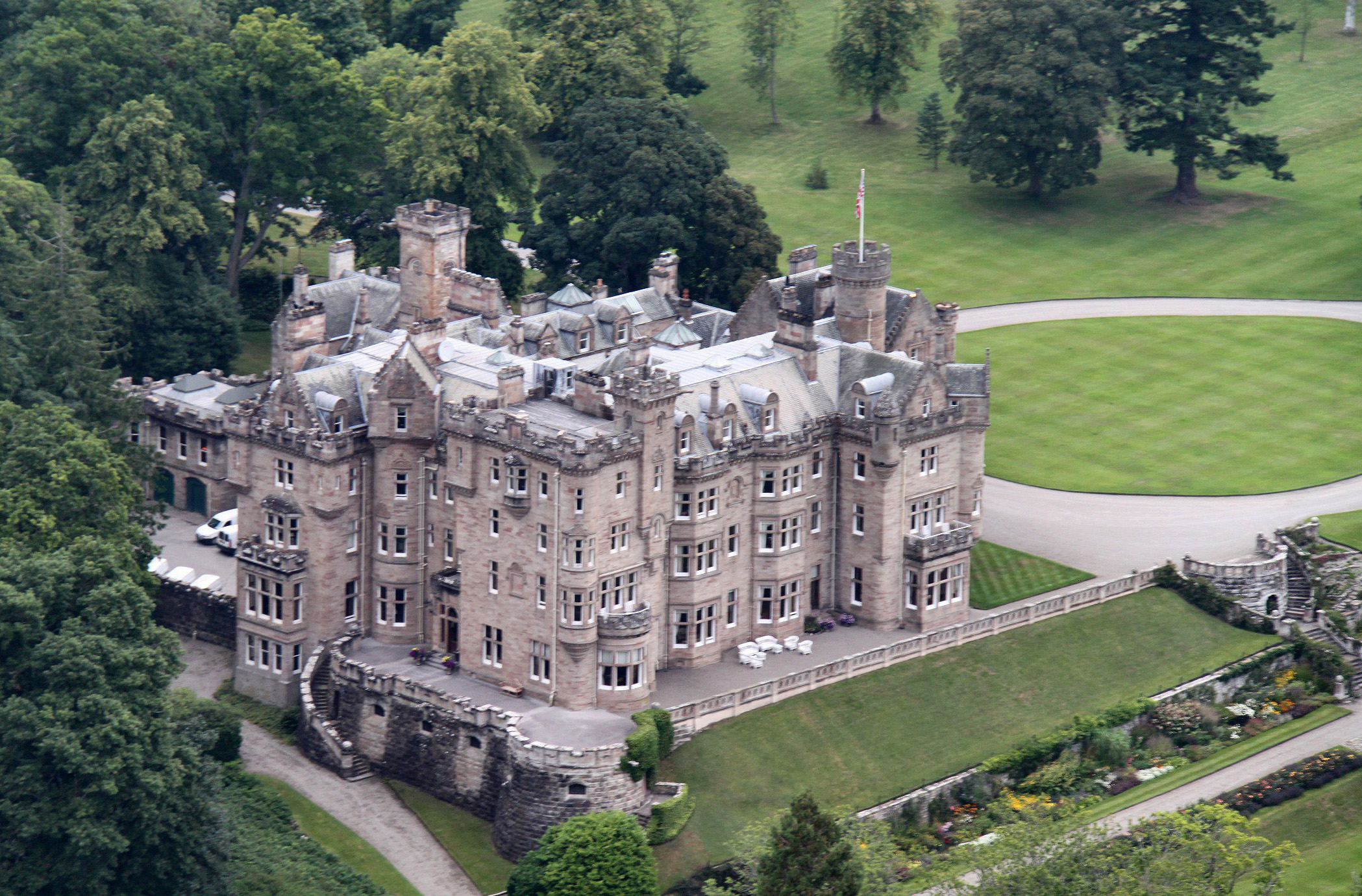
- Aerial view of Skibo Castle during 2013
- Interactive map of the Skibo Castle area

General information
- Status: Completed
- Type: Castle in use as a residential country club
- Architectural style: Scots baronial revival
- Location: Scottish Highlands, Clashmore; Dornoch; IV25 3RQ, Scotland
- Coordinates: 57°52′23.58″N 4°07′55.98″W
- Construction started: 1899 (incorporating earlier structures)
- Completed: 1901
- Owner: Skibo Ltd. (trading as The Carnegie Club)

Technical details
- Floor count: Four and five storeys
- Grounds: 502 hectares (1,240 acres)

Design and construction
- Architecture firm: Ross & Macbeth (1899 alterations)
- Other designers: T. H. Mawson (1901 gardens and terrace)

Other information
- Number of rooms: 21 rooms and 12 lodges

Website
- www.carnegieclub.co.uk

Listed Building – Category A
- Official name: Skibo Castle and Garden Terraces, Walled Garden and Glasshouses
- Designated: 18 March 1971
- Reference no.: LB597

Inventory of Gardens and Designed Landscapes in Scotland
- Official name: Skibo Castle
- Designated: 1 July 1987
- Reference no.: GDL00343

Skibo Castle (Scottish Gaelic: Caisteal Sgìobail) is located to the west of Dornoch in the Highland county of Sutherland, Scotland overlooking the Dornoch Firth. Although largely of the 19th century and early 20th century, when it was the home of industrialist Andrew Carnegie, its origins go back much earlier. Thomas Chirnside and his brother, Andrew Spencer Chirnside, bought the castle and the surrounding 20,000 acres for £125,000 in 1868 and lived there until they sold it in 1871 for £130,000.

It is now operated as The Carnegie Club, a members-only residential club, offering members and their guests accommodation in both the castle and estate lodges, a private links golf course and a range of activities including clay pigeon shooting, tennis and horse riding.

== Etymology ==
According to William J. Watson, Skibo is the anglicisation of Scottish Gaelic Sgìobal, which in turn comes from an Old Norse name meaning either firewood-steading or Skithi's steading.

== History ==
The first record of Skibo Castle is a charter from 1211. From its early history, the castle was a residence of the Bishops of Caithness. Skibo Castle remained the residence of subsequent bishops until 1545, when the estate was, as a tactical measure by the church, given to John Gray in order to reinforce its alliance with a powerful family as the threat of a Protestant uprising spread towards the north.

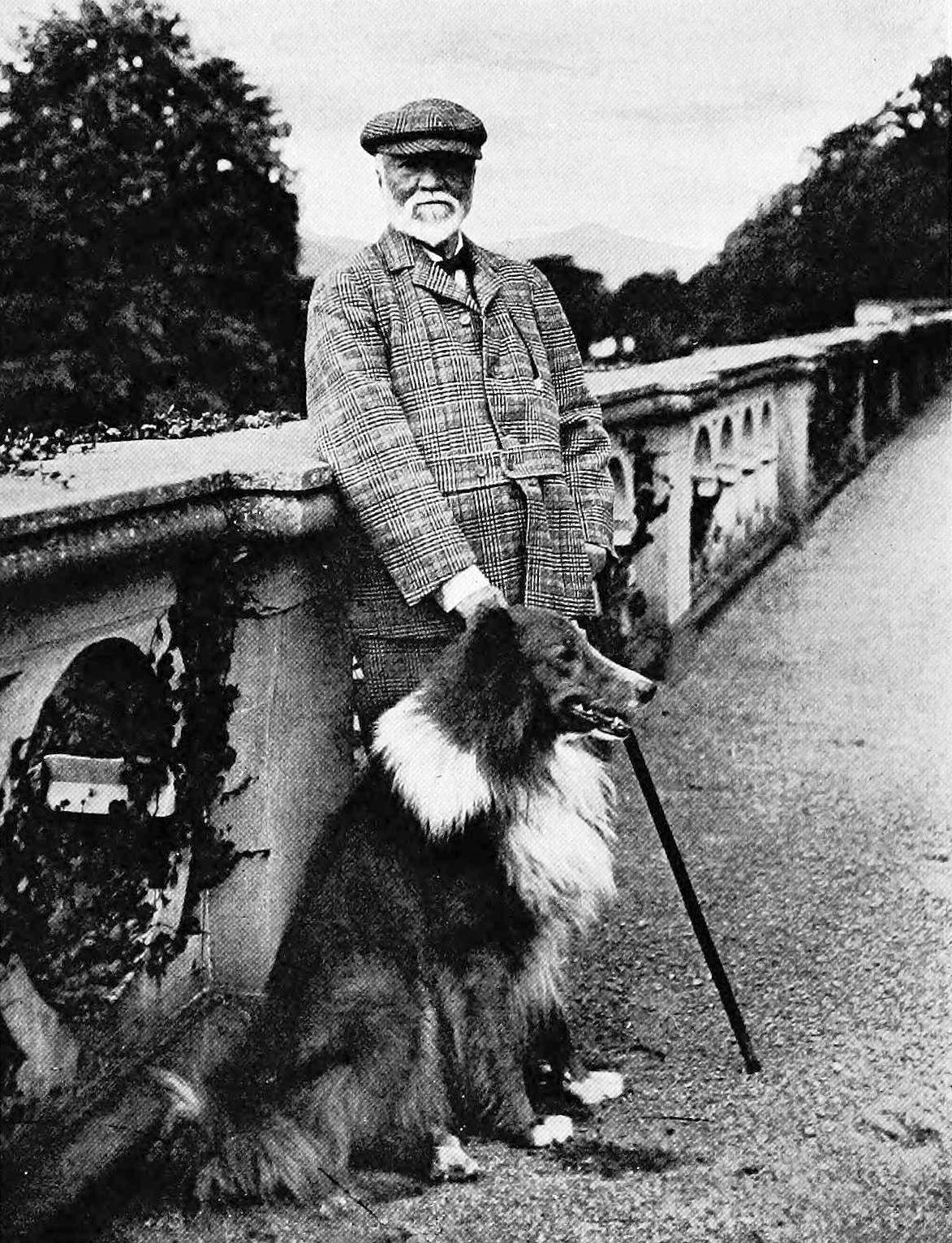
Andrew Carnegie at Skibo, 1914

In 1745, Robert Gray surrendered the estate. It was later bought by a relative who built a modern house before 1760. Its ownership changed frequently until 1872, when it was bought by Evan Charles Sutherland-Walker, who extended the house and improved the grounds. However, the condition of the building had declined by 1897, when wealthy industrialist Andrew Carnegie took a one-year lease, with an option to buy. In 1898 he exercised that option for £85,000. However its condition had declined so much by this time that a further £2 million was spent on improvements, including an increase in area from 16,000 square feet (1,500 m^{2}) to over 60,000 square feet (5,600 m^{2}), plus the creation of Loch Ospisdale, an indoor swimming pavilion and a 9-hole golf course. Carnegie employed Alexander Ross of Inverness to carry out major upgrading works including full electrical services served by a private power station.

Skibo stayed with the Carnegie family until 1982. It was later purchased by businessman Peter de Savary and used as the foundation of a private members club, The Carnegie Club. Establishment of the club required restoration of the castle to recreate the luxury of an Edwardian sporting estate. Similar renovation was undertaken on the many lodges located amongst the castle grounds to provide additional accommodation for club members. De Savary sold the club to Ellis Short in 2003, for £23 million. Following the Shorts' purchase of the club, some £20 million has been invested in the refurbishment and restoration of the 8,000 acre estate. Aware of the historic significance of the category-A listed castle and its contents, the Club have undertaken a programme of conservation over the last decade with the aim of preserving as much as possible of the building whilst improving the existing facilities on the estate. This includes the redevelopment of the golf course, a sympathetic restoration of Carnegie's magnificent swimming pool, ongoing restoration of the Mackenzie and Moncur glasshouses and the refurbishment of all bedrooms in the castle and lodges.

== The Carnegie Club ==

The Carnegie Club is a members-only club, with its accommodation and facilities available to its members and their guests. Non-members who wish to be considered for membership are invited to apply to the club's committee for a one-off visit before deciding whether to apply or not.

The Carnegie links golf course has fewer than 4000 rounds played on it per annum. As it is so quiet, residents of the club do not need to book tee times and can play whenever they wish. A limited number of public tee times are available to non-members/non-residents throughout the summer from May to October.

A nine hole course was created for Andrew Carnegie on the estate in 1898, laid out by Royal Dornoch Golf Club's secretary, John Sutherland. But by the 1940s the course was fallow. In 1995 a new 18 holes opened for play, designed by Donald Steel and his young assistant, Tom MacKenzie. In 2023 MacKenzie was called back to oversee a redesign, working alongside The Carnegie Club's own David Thompson and Gary Gruber. It included eight new holes as well as sand-capping, returfing and top dressing to bring out the essential links character. The course plays out on a peninsula surrounded by the waters of Loch Evelix and the Dornoch Firth. In National Club Golfer's 2026 Top 100 Scottish course ranking, The Carnegie Links is number 14.

The funds raised from membership fees and accommodation are reinvested into the upkeep of the estate.

The Carnegie Club hosted Madonna's wedding to Guy Ritchie on 22 December 2000. In 1995, it had hosted the marriage of golfer Sam Torrance and actress Suzanne Danielle. On 28 December 1997 it hosted the marriage of actor Robert Carlyle and Anastasia Shirley.

On 3 December 2006, the BBC Television programme Landward featured the Burnett family who for several generations had been tenants of a farm on Skibo estate. The programme highlighted their search for a new farm following their eviction by the estate. The farmhouse is now part of guest accommodation on the estate.

== Castle grounds ==
The grounds include Lake Louise, a very small artificial lake, and one of only a few bodies of water in Scotland known as lakes. The estate is listed on the Inventory of Gardens and Designed Landscapes in Scotland, the list of nationally significant designed landscapes.
