= Lord Lieutenant of Cromarty =

Ceremonial officer in Cromarty, Scotland

This is a list of Lord Lieutenants of Cromartyshire, Scotland.

- Robert Bruce Aeneas Macleod 5 May 1794 – 1833
- Roderick Macleod 6 May 1833 – 13 March 1853
- George Granville William Sutherland-Leveson-Gower, 3rd Duke of Sutherland 2 April 1853 – 26 August 1889

The office was replaced by the Lord Lieutenant of Ross and Cromarty in 1889 through the operation of the Local Government (Scotland) Act 1889.

== Deputy lieutenants ==
A deputy lieutenant of Cromarty is commissioned by the Lord Lieutenant of Cromarty. Deputy lieutenants support the work of the lord-lieutenant. There can be several deputy lieutenants at any time, depending on the population of the county. Their appointment does not terminate with the changing of the lord-lieutenant, but they usually retire at age 75.

=== 19th Century ===
- 20 April 1846: John Andrew Shaw Mackenzie
- 20 April 1846: Roderick Mackenzie
- 20 April 1846: Sir Alexander Matheson, 1st Baronet
- 20 April 1846: Henry Mackenzie Fowler
- 20 April 1846: Colin Lyon Mackenzie
