= Roderick McLeod =

Roderick McLeod may refer to:

- Roderick McLeod (British Army officer)
- Roderick McLeod (politician)
- Roderick McLeod (minister)

== See also ==
- Roderick Macleod (disambiguation)
