= Mediterranean 1900–01 (Battle honour) =

Battle honour of the British Army

Mediterranean 1900–01 was a battle honour awarded to the following Militia battalions of the British Army for their service during the Second Boer War of 1899–1902, when they performed garrison duty in the Mediterranean, relieving regular Army battalions for active service:

- 5th (Northumberland Milita) Battalion, Northumberland Fusiliers
- 3rd (3rd Royal Lancashire Militia) Battalion, Loyal North Lancashire Regiment
- 3rd (West Kent Militia) Battalion, Queen's Own (Royal West Kent Regiment)
- 3rd (Highland (Rifle) Militia) Battalion, Seaforth Highlanders

Personnel of these battalions were awarded the Queen's Mediterranean Medal.

This honour should not be confused with the award Mediterranean which was granted for service in the Crimean War.

This award was rescinded in 1910 when the Militia (now Special Reserve) battalions assumed the same honours as their parent regiments.
