= Highland Rifle Militia =

Auxiliary unit of the British Army

Ross, Caithness, Sutherland and Cromarty Militia Highland Rifle Militia 3rd (Reserve) Bn, Seaforth Highlanders
- Active: 23 April 1798–April 1953
- Country: United Kingdom
- Branch: Militia/Special Reserve
- Role: Infantry
- Size: 1 Battalion
- Part of: Seaforth Highlanders
- Garrison/HQ: Dingwall (1798–1908); Fort George (1908–53)
- Motto: Cuidich 'n Righ (Aid the King)
- Battle honours: Mediterranean 1900–1901

Commanders
- Notable commanders: Lt-Gen Francis Mackenzie, 1st Baron Seaforth; Col Charles Mackenzie Fraser of Castle Fraser and Inverallochy; Lt-Col Sir Hector Munro, 11th Baronet

The Highland Rifle Militia, originally the Ross, Caithness, Sutherland and Cromarty Militia, was a Scottish Militia regiment first raised during the French Revolutionary War. It served in home defence during the 19th Century, and in Egypt at the time of the Second Boer War. It became a reserve battalion of the Seaforth Highlanders and trained thousands of recruits for the fighting battalions during World War I. After 1921 the militia had only a shadowy existence until its final abolition in 1953.

== Scottish Militia ==
The universal obligation to military service in the Shire levy was long established in Scotland: all men aged from 16 to 60 were obliged to serve for a maximum of 40 days in any one year if required, and their arms and equipment were inspected at regular Wapenshaws. In time of war they would be called out by proclamation and by riders galloping through towns and villages bearing the 'Fiery Cross'.

After the restoration of Charles II, the Scottish Parliament passed an act in 1661, ratified in 1663, creating a militia of 20,000 infantry and 2000 horse, available for Crown service anywhere in Scotland, England or Ireland. These troops were called out in 1689 after the Glorious Revolution. Thereafter the militia in Scotland, as in England, was allowed to decline.

Following the Union of Scotland and England a Scottish Militia Bill was passed by the Union Parliament in 1708 but it failed to receive Royal Assent due to government fears of a Jacobite uprising. As a result of the Jacobite Rising of 1715 a Disarming Act was passed in Scotland and although some militia served in the Government forces against the Jacobite Rising of 1745 there was a reluctance to leave weapons in the hands of those who might rebel.

The English Militia were conscripted by ballot, and this was revived in 1757 during the Seven Years' War. However, there were residual fears of Jacobitism in Scotland, so rather than embody the moribund militia, full-time regiments of 'Fencibles' were raised for the duration of the war by means of normal recruitment. Scotland relied on Fencibles again during the War of American Independence and the early stages of the French Revolutionary War.

== Ross-shire Militia ==
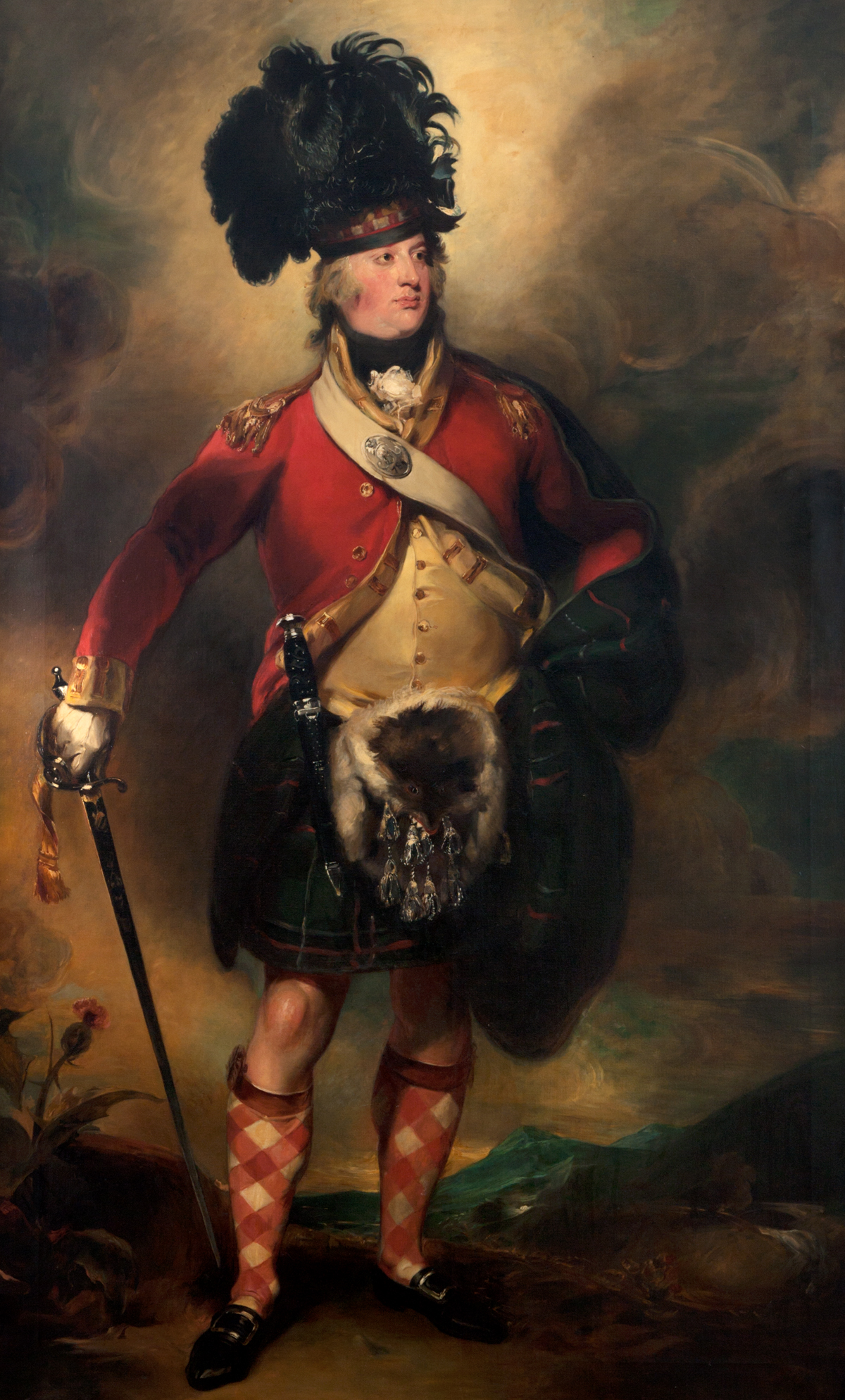
Portrait in the Highlanders' Museum of Lord Seaforth, by William Dyce after Sir Thomas Lawrence. Seaforth is depicted in the uniform of the 78th Highlanders (Ross-shire Buffs).

Finally, Parliament passed the Militia Act 1797, to raise and embody a militia force in Scotland, which introduced the ballot in that country. This measure was unpopular and there were anti-ballot riots in the west, but as in England volunteers and paid substitutes could be accepted in lieu of balloted men. Ten regiments of 'North British' (Scottish) militia were raised in 1798 under the 1797 Act, including the 2nd (or Ross-shire) Regiment formed at Dingwall in Ross-shire.

The regiment was embodied from 23 April 1798, on which day the lord lieutenant of Ross-shire, Lord Seaforth, was commissioned as colonel of the regiment. Seaforth was the hereditary chief of Clan Mackenzie, and on the outbreak of war in 1793 he had raised two battalions of 'Ross-shire Buffs', which were taken into the Regular Army as the 78th Highlanders. Captain W. Wilson, formerly of the 39th Foot, was commissioned as major of the new militia regiment.

After training during the summer of 1798, the new regiments were sent to winter quarters. In the case of the Ross-shires this was at Banff. This became an annual routine. In the winter of 1799–1800 the militia regiments were issued with two field guns each and ordered to train detachments in gun drill. The preliminaries of peace having been agreed in late 1801, the Scottish militia was prepared for disbandment. The 2nd (Ross-shire) Militia was accordingly disbanded on 1 May 1802, shortly after the signature of the Treaty of Amiens.

=== Napoleonic Wars ===
A new Militia (Scotland) Act 1802 came into force on 26 June, placing the Scottish militia on a permanent basis, to be manned by ballot from men aged 18–45 (paid substitutes were permitted), to serve for five years in Great Britain; peacetime training would be for 21 days. A new Ross, Caithness, Sutherland and Cromarty Militia (sometimes abbreviated to RCSC Militia) was formed, the title emphasising the four northern Highland counties that constituted its recruitment area. Lord Seaforth (now a major-general) was reappointed colonel from 18 October. However, he was absent for most of 1802–06 as Governor of Barbados, and the regiment was commanded by Lieutenant-Colonel the Earl of Caithness, commissioned on 18 December. The Earl was chief of Clan Sinclair and Lord Lieutenant of Caithness, and also colonel of the three battalions of Caithness Volunteers.

The Peace of Amiens soon broke down, and the new regiment was embodied for full-time service again on 12 March 1803. During the ensuing Napoleonic Wars the militia were transformed. They were embodied for a whole generation, and became regiments of full-time professional soldiers (though restricted to service in the British Isles), which the Regular Army increasingly saw as a prime source of recruits. They served in coast defences, manned garrisons, guarded prisoners of war, and carried out internal security duty, while their traditional local defence duties were taken over by the Volunteers and mounted Yeomanry.

In the summer of 1805, when Napoleon was massing his 'Army of England' at Boulogne for a projected invasion, the Ross-shire Militia was stationed in Norfolk. Under the command of the Earl of Caithness, the regiment, 558 strong, had four companies at Norwich Barracks and four at Yarmouth, comprising Maj-Gen George Milner's infantry brigade headquartered at Norwich.

=== Local Militia ===
While the Regular Militia were the mainstay of national defence during the Napoleonic Wars, they were supplemented from 1808 by the Local Militia, which were part-time and only to be used within their own districts. These were raised to counter the declining numbers of Volunteers, and if their ranks could not be filled voluntarily the militia ballot was employed. They were to be trained once a year. The counties of Ross & Cromarty, Caithness, and Sutherland raised the following regiments in 1809:

- Wester Ross: 1st (or Western Regiment) of Ross-shire Local Militia – 810 men organised at Dingwall under the command of Lt-Col Duncan Munro of Culcain, who had served in the 78th Highlanders and after retirement had been Lt-Col Commandant of the 2nd (Wester Ross) Battalion, Ross-shire Volunteers.
- Easter Ross: 2nd (or Eastern) Regiment of Ross-shire Local Militia – 906 men under Colonel-Commandant Donald Macleod of Genies, former commander of the 1st Bn of Ross-shire Volunteers.
- Caithness: 726 men under the Earl of Caithness
- Sutherland: 900 men under Earl Gower

=== Waterloo and long peace ===
Lord Seaforth was promoted to Lieutenant-General in 1808, but took no part in public life in his later years. After Napoleon's abdication in 1814 the RCSC Militia was disembodied on 2 September. However, it was called out again during the Waterloo campaign from 1 August 1815 to 10 June 1816.

Lord Seaforth had died in January, and Charles Mackenzie Fraser of Castle Fraser and Inverallochy, Member of Parliament (MP) for Ross-shire and a former Coldstream Guards officer and Peninsular War veteran, was appointed colonel from 17 May 1815.

Fraser remained colonel of the regiment throughout the long peace that followed Waterloo. Although ballots continued to be held until they were suspended by the Militia Act 1829, the regiments were rarely assembled for training and the permanent staffs of sergeants and drummers (who were occasionally used to maintain public order) were progressively reduced. Officers continued to be commissioned sporadically (a number were appointed to the RCSC Militia in the mid-1830s, including the Hon James Sinclair of Braelangwell, younger son of the 12th Earl of Caithness, the regiment's former lieutenant-colonel, and himself a retired officer, who was appointed Lt-Col in 1831) but they had no duties to perform and essentially the militia was in abeyance.

== 1852 Reforms ==
The national Militia of the United Kingdom was revived by the Militia Act of 1852, enacted during a period of international tension. As before, units were raised and administered on a county basis, and filled by voluntary enlistment (although conscription by means of the Militia Ballot might be used if the counties failed to meet their quotas). Training was for 56 days on enlistment, then for 21–28 days per year, during which the men received full army pay. Under the act, Militia units could be embodied by Royal Proclamation for full-time home defence service in three circumstances:

1. 'Whenever a state of war exists between Her Majesty and any foreign power'.
2. 'In all cases of invasion or upon imminent danger thereof'.
3. 'In all cases of rebellion or insurrection'.

The RCSC Militia was reformed at Dingwall in 1852, and in 1854 it was designated a rifle corps, as the Ross, Caithness, Sutherland and Cromarty Rifle Militia (RCSCRM).

The position of colonel in the militia was abolished after 1852, but Charles Fraser remained Honorary Colonel of the regiment until his death in 1871. The Hon James Sinclair continued as lieutenant-colonel.

The Crimean War having broken out and a large expeditionary force sent overseas, the militia were called out for home defence: the RCSCRM was embodied on 6 March 1855. At first it was stationed at Dingwall, then during October it moved to garrison Fort George at Ardersier, across the Moray Firth from Cromarty.

Lieutenant-Col Sinclair died on 18 January 1856 and was replaced on 11 February as Lt-Col Commandant by George Ross, a former officer in the 92nd Highlanders, who had been appointed to the regiment as a captain in 1854 and promoted to major in November 1855. He remained in command for the next 26 years

After the signature of the Treaty of Paris in March 1856 the militia could be stood down, and the RCSCRM was disembodied on 23 June 1856. Unlike some other regiments it was not re-embodied during the Indian Mutiny.

=== Highland Rifle Militia ===
Arguing that the regiment was the only militia unit entirely recruited from the Scottish Highlands, Lt-Col Ross applied to the War Office (WO) in 1860 for it to be uniformed in Highland dress. This was granted (see below) and the regiment became known as the Highland Rifle Militia, although the title remained unofficial until 30 July 1867 when the queen's approval was given. However, for several years the Army List merely showed this as a subtitle in brackets after its formal RCSCRM designation.

Over the following years the regiment was mustered each year for 21 or 28 days' training. Militia battalions now had a large cadre of permanent staff (about 30) and a number of the officers were former Regulars. Around a third of the recruits and many young officers went on to join the Regular Army. Under the Militia Reserve Cat 1867 a Militia Reserve was introduced, consisting of present and former militiamen who undertook to serve overseas in case of war.

== Cardwell Reforms ==
Under the 'Localisation of the Forces' scheme introduced by the Cardwell Reforms of 1872, Militia were grouped into subdistricts or brigades with their local Regular and Volunteer battalions. Brigade No 55 was organised as follows:

- 71st Highlanders (Light Infantry)
- 78th Highlanders (Ross-shire Buffs)
- Highland Light Infantry Militia at Inverness
- Highland Rifle Militia at Dingwall
- No 55 Brigade Depot at Fort George
- 1st Administrative Battalion, Elgin Rifle Volunteers at Elgin
- 1st Administrative Battalion, Inverness Rifle Volunteers at Inverness
- 1st Administrative Battalion, Ross-shire Rifle Volunteers at Dingwall
- 1st Administrative Battalion, Sutherland Rifle Volunteers at Golspie

While the sub-districts were referred to as 'brigades', they were purely administrative organisations. Following the Cardwell Reforms a mobilisation scheme began to appear in the Army List from December 1875. This assigned Regular and Militia units to places in an order of battle of corps, divisions and brigades for the 'Active Army', even though these formations were entirely theoretical, with no staff or services assigned. The Highland Rifle Militia was assigned to 1st Brigade of 2nd Division, VIII Corps in Scotland. The brigade would have mustered at Glasgow in time of war.

=== 3rd Battalion, Seaforth Highlanders ===
The Childers Reforms of 1881 took Cardwell's reforms further, with the linked Regular battalions becoming regiments and the affiliated militia becoming numbered battalions of the regiment. However, not all of the 1872 links were retained: Brigade No 55 was reorganised and Lord Seaforth's 78th Highlanders (The Ross-shire Buffs) were instead linked with the 72nd Highlanders (Duke of Albany's) to form the Seaforth Highlanders (Ross-shire Buffs, the Duke of Albany's) on 1 July 1881. The Highland Rifle Militia became 3rd (Highland (Rifle) Militia) Battalion, Seaforth Highlanders. The Regimental Depot was at Fort George, but the 3rd Bn retained its headquarters at Dingwall.

Lieutenant-Col Ross retired in 1882 and Maj Alexander Mcleay was promoted to succeed him in command. He in turn retired in 1899, when he was appointed Honorary Colonel of the regiment, and was succeeded in command by Sir Hector Munro, 11th Baronet of Foulis, who had been commissioned into the regiment as a captain in 1871, and received the personal rank of honorary Lt-Col in 1885.

=== Second Boer War ===
When the bulk of the Regular Army was sent to South Africa at the outbreak of the Second Boer War, the Militia Reserve was called out as reinforcements, followed by the militia battalions for home defence. The 3rd Seaforths were embodied on 13 December 1899. The battalion volunteered for foreign service and was sent to relieve Regular troops in Egypt. It occupied the Citadel Barracks at Cairo from February 1900 to May 1901 under the command of Lt-Col Sir Hector Munro. It returned home to be disembodied on 11 June 1901 and was afterwards granted the Battle honour Mediterranean 1900–1901.

== Special Reserve ==
After the Boer War, the future of the militia was called into question. There were moves to reform the Auxiliary Forces (Militia, Yeomanry and Volunteers) to take their place in the six Army Corps proposed by the Secretary of State for War, St John Brodrick. However, little of Brodrick's scheme was carried out. Under the more sweeping Haldane Reforms of 1908, the Militia was replaced by the Special Reserve (SR), a semi-professional force whose role was to provide reinforcement drafts for regular units serving overseas in wartime, rather like the earlier Militia Reserve. The 3rd (Highland Rifle Militia) Bn became the 3rd (Reserve) Battalion of the Seaforths on 28 April 1908, and finally moved its HQ to Fort George.

=== 3rd (Reserve) Battalion ===
On the outbreak of World War I on 4 August 1914 3rd (Reserve) Bn mobilised at Fort George under the command of Lt-Col Alexander Mackenzie, MVO, (appointed 12 August 1911) and went to its war station at Cromarty. The second-in-command, Maj Walter Gaisford, who had been commanding the regimental depot, left on 19 August to command the regiment's first 'Kitchener's Army' battalion, 7th Seaforths (he was killed at the Battle of Loos). Lieutenant-Col Mackenzie also went to command another battalion on 19 August and was temporarily replaced by Maj Chilton Addison-Smith (until 12 September 1914) and then the battalion's former CO, Col Edward Horne, took over until Mackenzie returned on 1 October 1915. 3rd (R) Battalion remained in the Cromarty Garrison for the whole of the war, carrying out its twin duties of coast defence and training reinforcement drafts for the Regular battalions serving on the Western Front (and in the case of 1st Bn also in Mesopotamia and Palestine). Lieutenant-Col John Grant succeeded Lt-Col Mackenzie in command on 30 August 1918.

After the Armistice with Germany the remaining personnel of 3rd (R) Bn were drafted to the 1st Seaforths on 26 July 1919 and the 3rd Battalion was disembodied on 3 August 1919.

=== 10th (Reserve) Battalion ===
After Lord Kitchener issued his call for volunteers in August 1914, the battalions of the 1st, 2nd and 3rd New Armies ('K1', 'K2' and 'K3' of 'Kitchener's Army') were quickly formed at the regimental depots. The SR battalions also swelled with new recruits and were soon well above their establishment strength. On 8 October 1914 each SR battalion was ordered to use the surplus to form a service battalion of the 4th New Army ('K4'). Accordingly, the 3rd (Reserve) Bn at Cromarty formed the 10th (Service) Bn, Seaforth Highlanders on 28 October, under the command of Lt-Col Addison-Smith, promoted from 3rd (R) Bn. The new battalion became part of 101st Brigade in 34th Division and began training for active service.

In the spring of 1915 the WO decided to convert the K4 battalions into 2nd Reserve units, providing drafts for the K1–K3 battalions in the same way that the SR was doing for the Regular battalions. On 10 April 1915 the 10th Bn became 10th (Reserve) Battalion of the Seaforths, and joined 9th Reserve Brigade at Tain, Ross-shire. 10th (R) Battalion initially trained drafts for the 7th, 8th and 9th (Service) Bns of the regiment serving on the Western Front. In October 1915 it moved to Catterick in North Yorkshire, but returned to Dunfermline in Scotland in April 1916.

On 1 September 1916 the 2nd Reserve battalions were transferred to the Training Reserve and the battalion was redesignated as 39th Training Reserve Bn, still in 9th Reserve Bde at Dunfermline. The training staff retained their Seaforth badges. The battalion was disbanded at Bridge of Allan on 27 February 1918.

=== Postwar ===
The SR resumed its old title of Militia in 1921 but like most militia units the 3rd Seaforths remained in abeyance after World War I. Lieutenant-Col Addison-Smith became CO on 13 July 1921, but by the outbreak of World War II in 1939, no officers remained listed for the 3rd Bn. The Militia was formally disbanded in April 1953.

== Heritage and ceremonial ==
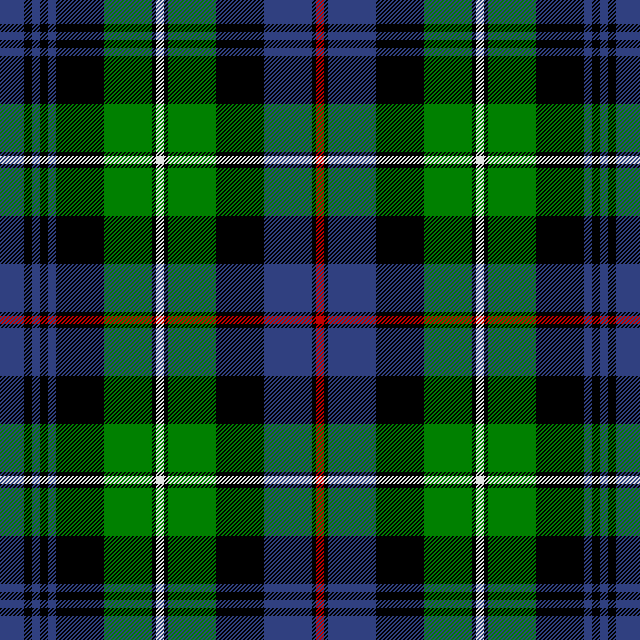
The Mackenzie tartan of the 78th Highlanders and Seaforths.

=== Uniforms and insignia ===
The officers' shoulder-belt plate of ca 1810 was a gilt oval engraved with a crowned thistle. Round the top edge of the plate was the motto Cuidich 'n Righ, and below the thistle was '5.B Militia'. The 1st Ross Local Militia wore buttons with a crown above '1st', the words 'Ross' round the upper rim and 'Local Militia' round the lower.

From at least 1814 the RCSC Militia wore red uniforms with buff facings until it became a rifle corps in 1854, when it adopted a temporary uniform of light grey shell jackets and trousers with pale green facings. However, the officers and the sergeants of the permanent staff wore the same uniform as the Rifle Brigade (Rifle green with black facings), and the following year the whole regiment was issued with full dress uniforms identical to the Rifle Brigade apart from insignia. The black coatee button had a crowned light infantry bugle-horn while the badge worn on the 'pork pie' cap 1854–68 was a bugle-horn above a scroll inscribed 'Ross'.

When the regiment adopted highland dress in 1860, it wore Rifle green doublets with a kilt of Mackenzie tartan as worn by the 78th Highlanders (originally Lord Seaforth's Ross-shire Buffs). They wore brownish-grey hose, round flat bonnets with the regimental crest, and black goatskin sporrans with brass tops. In 1866 the volunteers of the regiment were issued with a belted plaid and the cap was of a more 'set up' shape with a grouse wing plume. The doublet button from 1860 until 1881 was black with the italic letters 'RCSC' between a crown above and a bugle-horn below. The cap badge from 1868 was a white metal open heart shape containing a bugle-horn above an inverted chevron, the whole surmounted by a crown. There is a photograph of kilted privates of the regiment in 1866 in the Royal Collection and a painting of the officers in kilts ca 1870 in the Highlanders' Museum.

However, kilts only remained in use until 1870 when Col Ross applied to the queen for permission to replace them with more practical trews. These were issued in Mackenzie tartan the following year, together with a green shako with a diced green and black border similar to that of the 71st Highland Light Infantry, or a Glengarry cap of 79th Cameron Highlanders pattern for undress wear. The Pipe-major and pipers continued to wear the kilt.

In 1881 the regiment adopted the uniform of the Seaforth Highlanders with red doublet and buff facings, distinguished only by the tartan trews instead of kilts, the letter 'M' on the shoulder straps, and the shako instead of the feather bonnet. On becoming Special Reserve in 1908 the battalion was given the full dress of the Seaforth Highlanders (including kilt) but without the feather bonnet.

=== Precedence ===
The first ten regiments of Scottish Militia raised in 1798 were numbered sequentially, the Ross–shire being the 2nd. When they were re-embodied in 1803 the Scottish militia regiments were included in a single order of precedence with the English and Welsh regiments, their positions being allocated by drawing lots. The Ross-shire regiment received the number 5; formally, it became the '5th Ross, Caithness, Sutherland and Cromarty Militia' and unlike most militia regiments it did include the numeral in some of its insignia. These positions remained unchanged until 1833.

In 1833 the king drew the lots for individual regiments and the resulting list continued in force with minor amendments until the end of the militia. The regiments raised before 1783 took the first 69 places, followed by the 60 regiments raised during the French Revolutionary War; the Ross-shires became 96th.

=== Honorary colonels ===
As part of the 1852 reforms, the position of Colonel of the Regiment in the militia was abolished. However, militia regiments were permitted to appoint an honorary colonel. The following served in this position for the Highland Rifle Militia:

- Charles Mackenzie Fraser, former colonel appointed 17 May 1815, died 1871
- Alexander Mcleay, CB, former CO, appointed 13 September 1899
- Sir Hector Munro, 11th Baronet, former CO, appointed 28 April 1908

=== Memorials ===
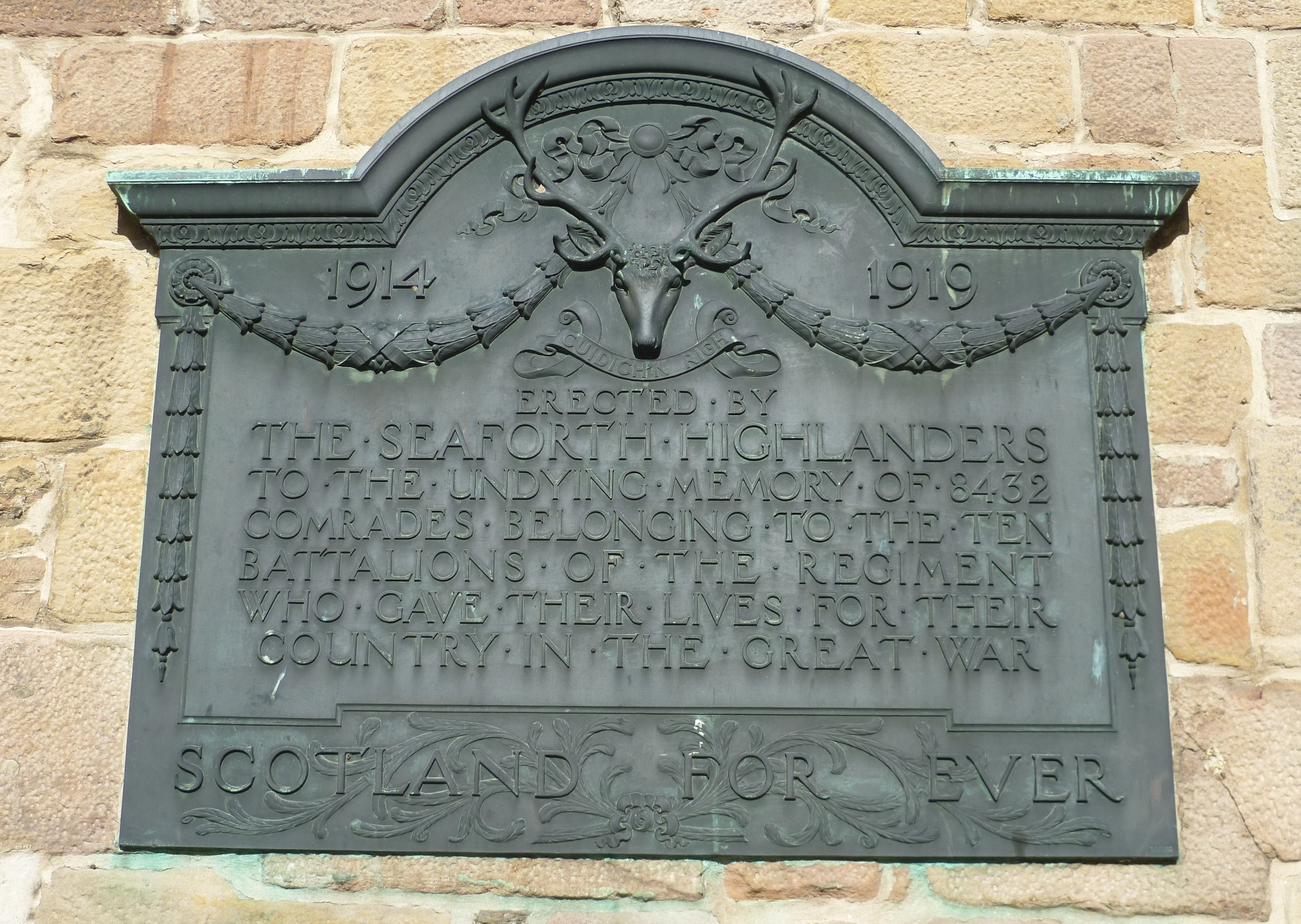
The Seaforths' World War I memorial at Tain.

There are identical bronze memorial plaques to the Seaforths' dead of World War I at several sites in Scotland, including the regimental depot at Fort George and the Tolbooth at Tain, where 10th (R) Battalion trained. There is also a memorial tablet in St Regulus Church in Cromarty, where 3rd (R) Bn was stationed.

=== Battle honour ===
The regiment's colours bore the battle honour Mediterranean, 1900–1901 awarded for its overseas service in the Boer War. However, this was rescinded in 1910 when the SR battalions assumed the same honours as their parent regiments.

== See also ==
- Scottish Militia
- Militia (United Kingdom)
- Seaforth Highlanders
- Special Reserve
