= Mackenzie baronets of Darien (1703) =

The Mackenzie baronetcy, of Darien in the County of Ross, was created in the Baronetage of Nova Scotia on 22 February 1703 for Alexander Mackenzie. Cokayne comments on the lack of official documentation for this creation.

== Mackenzie baronets, of Darien (1703) ==
- Sir Alexander Mackenzie, 1st Baronet (1663–1744) He participated in the Darien expedition, and settled in Jamaica where he owned the Farenough estate.
- Sir George Mackenzie, 2nd Baronet (1711-c. 1780) Or McKenzie; he apparently didn't use the title.
- Sir George Udney Mackenzie, 3rd Baronet (1747–1815)
- Sir Arthur Mackenzie, 4th Baronet (1782–1836)
- Sir George Mackenzie, 5th Baronet (1811–1839)

The title became dormant on the death of the 5th Baronet in 1839. It was then assumed in the period 1900 to 1904 by Edward Mackenzie-Mackenzie. He was the son of Edward Maunde Thompson and his wife Georgina Susanna Mackenzie (born 1839), posthumous daughter of the 5th Baronet.
