= Lord Lieutenant of Ross and Cromarty =

Ceremonial officer in Ross and Cromarty, Scotland

The Lord Lieutenant of Ross and Cromarty, is the British monarch's personal representative in an area which has been defined since 1975 as consisting of the local government districts of Ross and Cromarty and Skye and Lochalsh in Scotland, and this definition was renewed by the Lord-Lieutenants (Scotland) Order 1996. Previously, the area of the lieutenancy was the county of Ross and Cromarty, which was abolished as a local government area by the Local Government (Scotland) Act 1973. The districts were created, under the 1973 act as districts of the two-tier Highland region and abolished as local government areas under the Local Government (Scotland) Act 1994, which turned the Highland region into a unitary council area.

Prior to 1889 there had been a separate Lord Lieutenant of Ross and a Lord Lieutenant of Cromarty, but these were merged by the Local Government (Scotland) Act 1889, which directed that the incumbent Lord Lieutenant of Ross should automatically become the new Lord Lieutenant for Ross and Cromarty.

== List of Lord-Lieutenants of Ross and Cromarty ==
- Mackenzie had been Lord Lieutenant of Ross-shire
- Sir Kenneth Mackenzie, 6th Baronet 26 August 1889 – 1899
- Sir Hector Munro, 11th Baronet 7 July 1899 – 15 December 1935
- Sir Hector Mackenzie, 8th Baronet 24 April 1936 – 1955
- Sir Richard O'Connor 3 November 1955 – 1964
- Sir John Stirling 29 August 1964 – 1968
- Alexander Francis Matheson 9 October 1968 – 20 August 1976
- Sir John Hayes 1 February 1977 – 1988
- Sir Roderick Stirling 29 June 1988 – 2007
- Janet Bowen 2 June 2007 – July 2019
- Joanie Whiteford July 2019 – present

=== Vice Lieutenants ===
- Colonel James Alexander Stewart-Mackenzie 22 March 1900

== References and external links ==
- Website of the Lord-Lieutenant of Ross and Cromarty
- Sainty, J. C. (September 2005). "Lieutenants and Lord-Lieutenants of Counties (Scotland) 1794-".
