= Kilmonivaig =

Village in Inverness-shire, Scotland

Coordinates: 56.90166°N 4.99984°W

Kilmonivaig: Scottish Gaelic: Cill MoNaomhaig
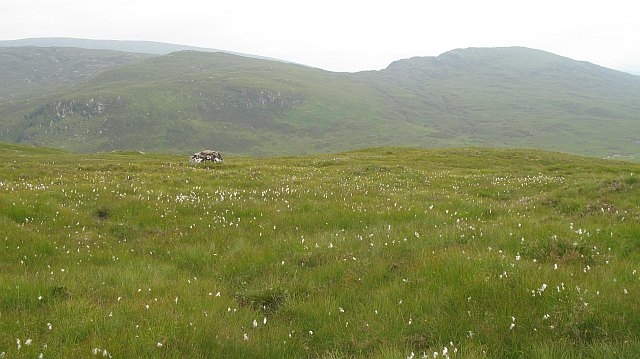
- Bog north of Abhainn Rath

- Location within the Lochaber area
- OS grid reference: NN174829
- Council area: Highland
- Country: Scotland
- Sovereign state: United Kingdom
- Post town: Spean Bridge
- Postcode district: PH34 4
- Dialling code: 01397
- Police: Scotland
- Fire: Scottish
- Ambulance: Scottish
- UK Parliament: Ross, Skye and Lochaber

Kilmonivaig (Scottish Gaelic: Cill MoNaomhaig) is a small village, situated close to the southeast end of Loch Lochy in Lochaber, Inverness-shire, Scottish Highlands and is in the Scottish council area of Highland.

Fort William lies approximately 15 miles southwest of Kilmonivaig.

== Parish of Kilmonivaig ==
Kilmonivaig is also the name of the large parish which has its Church of Scotland parish church one kilometer from the bridge at Spean Bridge on the north side of the river. Kilmonivaig was one of the two constituent parishes which traditionally made up Lochaber.

A memorial to the Commandos, who trained at nearby Achnacarry, is situated on a vantage point above Spean Bridge looking out over Kilmonivaig. The work of sculptor Scott Sutherland, it was cast by H.H. Martyn & Co. of Cheltenham and unveiled by Queen Elizabeth The Queen Mother on 27 September 1952.

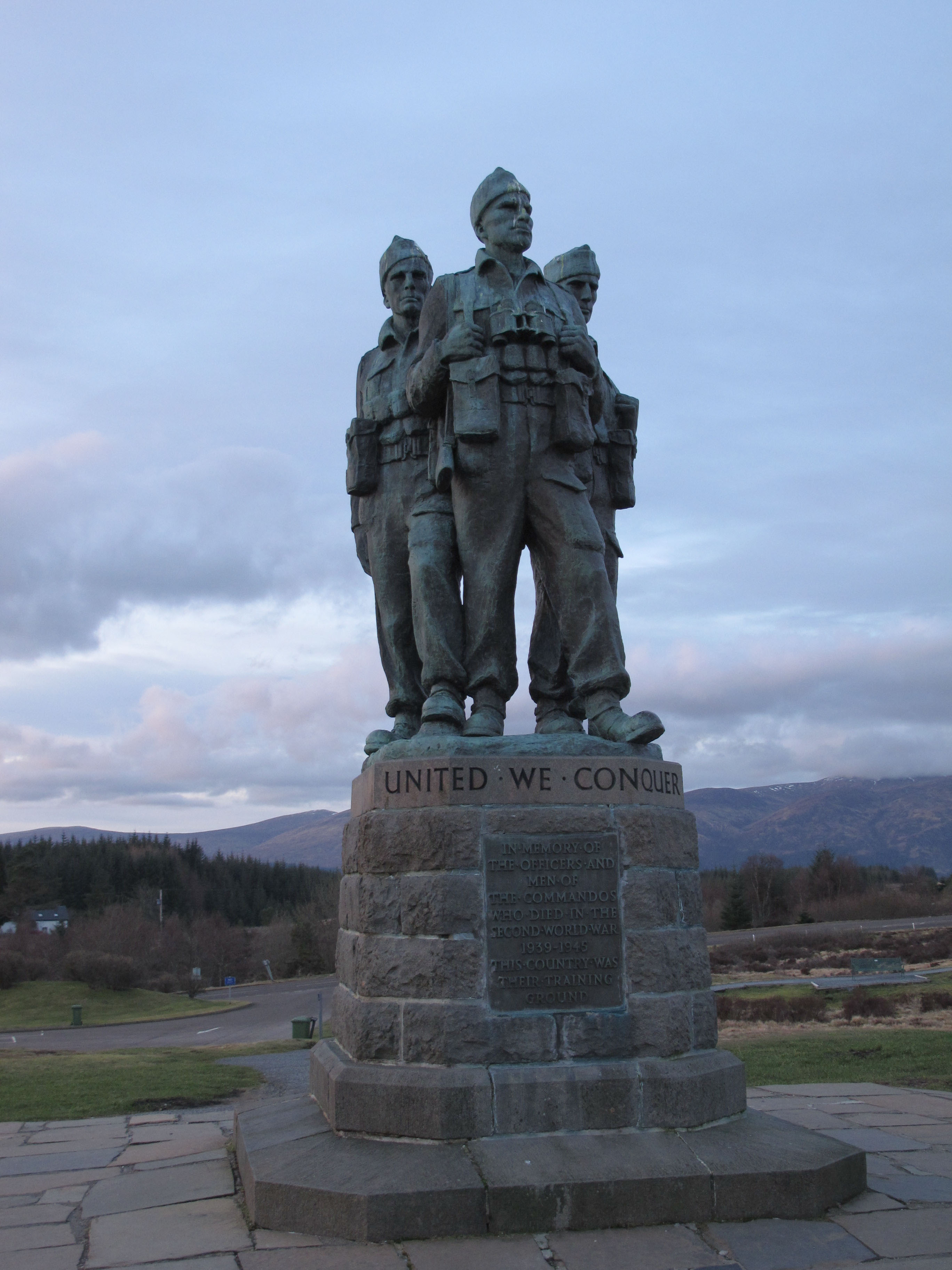
Monument to the Commandos who marched past this site on their way to train at Achnacarry during the Second World War

== Bridges of Kilmonivaig Parish ==
The villages of Roy Bridge and Spean Bridge both boast bridges designed by Thomas Telford between 1817 and 1819 and subsequently widened. Just downstream of Spean Bridge is the remains of High Bridge completed by General Wade in 1736 at a cost of £1,087.

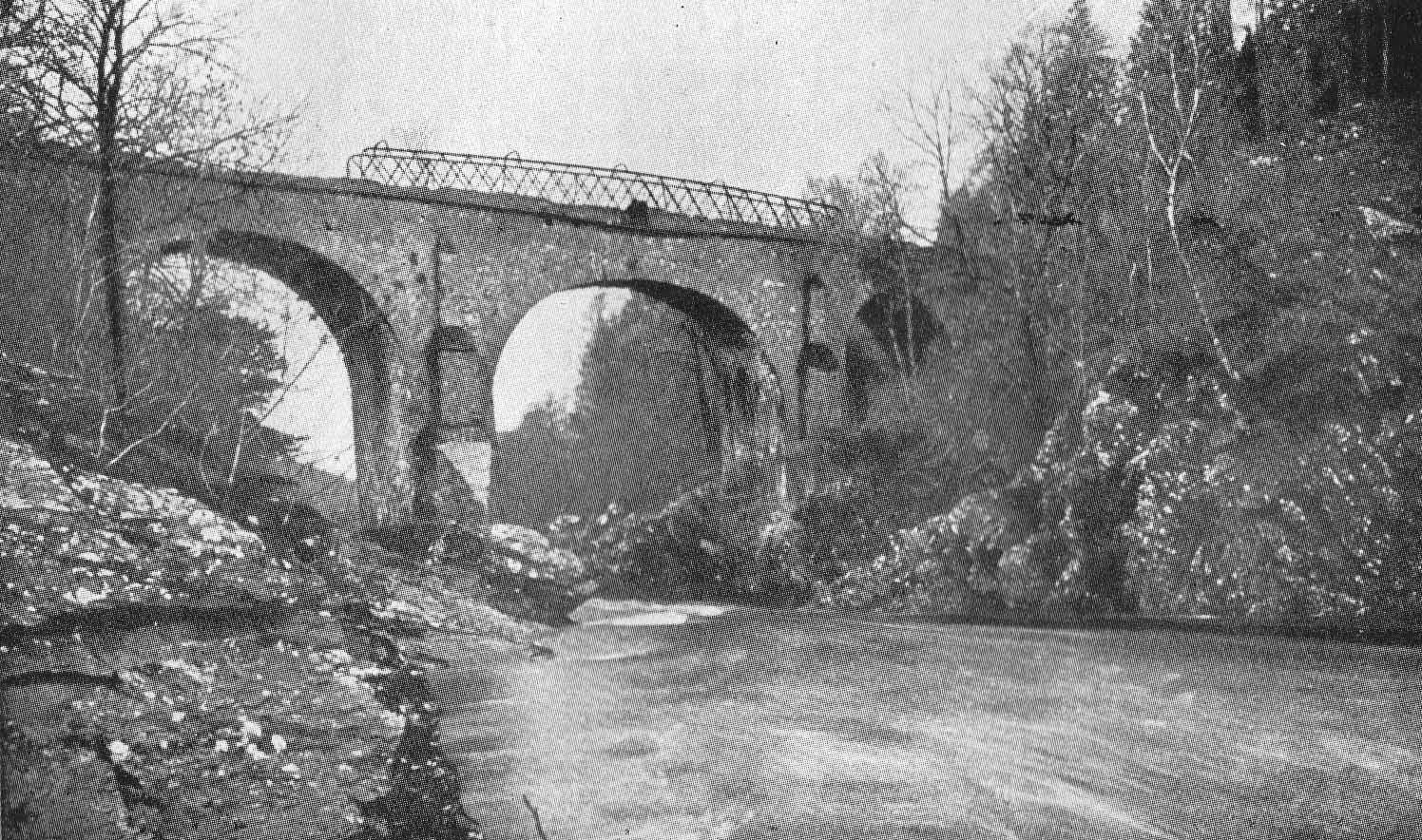
Wade's High Bridge as it was in the late 19th century

== Royal Heritage and battles ==
In 1431 a battle took place at Kilmonivaig between Donald Baleal, cousin of Alexander of Islay, Earl of Ross, then a state prisoner of Tantallon Castle and the Earls of Caithness. In this battle the royal forces were defeated and the Earl of Caithness was slain. In 1645 Montrose fought Argyll, with Argyll being defeated.
