= Roderick Macleod, 2nd of Cadboll =

Scottish laird (??–1770)

Roderick Macleod, 2nd of Cadboll (died 1770) was a Scottish laird who supported the Jacobite cause and fought for Bonnie Prince Charlie in The 'Forty-Five'. (Note: Roderick Macleod was the 2nd [Macleod] of Cadboll (National Archive of Scotland staff 2012), and may be referred to as such when an authority needs to identify him from other relatives with similar names.)

== Biography ==
Roderick Macleod was the son of Aeneas Macleod and Margaret, eldest daughter of Sir Kenneth Mackenzie, 1st Baronet and 4th of Scatwell. Macleod fought for Bonnie Prince Charlie in The 'Forty-Five', but the family estate was not confiscated on understanding that he went into exile for a time. He registered arms with the Lord Lyon c. 1730. When he died in 1770 his estates and social position were inherited by his son Robert Bruce Aeneas Macleod.

== Family ==
In 1751 Roderick Macleod married his cousin Lilias, daughter of William Mackenzie of Belmaduthy, they had two children Margaret, and a son Robert Bruce Aeneas his heir and successor.
