= Sir Kenneth Mackenzie, 3rd Baronet =

Scottish politician

Sir Kenneth Mackenzie, 3rd Baronet (c. 1658 – 13 September 1728) was a Scottish politician who served as a shire commissioner for Cromartyshire in the Parliament of Scotland and as one of the first Scottish MPs in the new Parliament of Great Britain.

The younger son of Sir George Mackenzie, 2nd Baronet, his father resigned the baronetcy to him in 1704 after being created Earl of Cromartie.

He was chosen as a shire commissioner for Cromartyshire in the Parliament of Scotland, sitting from 1693 to 1707. He was then one of the 43 Scottish MPs selected to represent Scotland in the first Parliament of Great Britain in 1707.

He twice represented the constituency of Cromartyshire in the Parliament of Great Britain from 1 November 1710 – 29 September 1713 and from 15 September 1727 to his death.

He married 3 times and left 6 sons and 2 daughters by his second wife, Anne Campbell. He was succeeded by his eldest son, Sir George Mackenzie.

Parliament of Scotland
Preceded by George Dallas (until 1686)	Shire Commissioner for Cromarty; 1693–1707; With: John Urquhart 1693; Roderick Mackenzie 1700–1701; Eneas Macleod 1703–1707	Succeeded by Parliament of Great Britain
Parliament of Great Britain
New constituency alternating constituency, with Nairnshire	Member of Parliament for Cromartyshire; 1710–1713	Vacant alternating constituency, with Nairnshire Title next held by Alexander Urquhart (from 1715)
Vacant alternating constituency, with Nairnshire Title last held by Alexander Urquhart (until 1722)	Member of Parliament for Cromartyshire; 1727–1728	Succeeded by Sir George Mackenzie
Baronetage of Nova Scotia
Preceded by George Mackenzie	Baronet (of Tarbat); 1704–1728	Succeeded by George Mackenzie
