= Sir George Mackenzie, 4th Baronet =

Scottish politician

Sir George Mackenzie, 4th Baronet (c. 1702–1748), of Cromarty and Grandvale, was a Scottish politician who sat in the British House of Commons from 1729 to 1734.

Mackenzie was the eldest son of Sir Kenneth Mackenzie, 3rd Baronet, of Cromarty by his second wife. He succeeded his father to the baronetcy on 13 September 1728.

Mackenzie also succeeded his father as Member of Parliament for Cromartyshire being returned at a by-election on 25 March 1729. He was an independent, voting with the Administration on the army in 1732, but against them on the Excise Bill in 1733 and the repeal of the Septennial Act in 1734. In 1734, there was no election at Cromartyshire, which was an alternating constituency.

Mackenzie became bankrupt and sold his estate of Cromarty in 1741. At the time of the 1745 Jacobite rebellion he stayed loyal, although his cousin, George Mackenzie, 3rd Earl of Cromartie, joined the rising. He brought together the baronetcies when he inherited the baronetcy of Royston on the death of his uncle in 1744. In about 1747, he married Elizabeth Reid. He died without issue on 20 May 1748. The baronetcies then passed to his brother Kenneth who died without issue in 1763. The baronetcies then devolved upon the succession of the 3rd Earl of Cromartie, who had been executed for treason and fell under attainer and thus became extinct.

Parliament of Great Britain
Preceded by Sir Kenneth Mackenzie	Member of Parliament for Cromartyshire; 1729–1734	Succeeded by Sir William Gordon
Baronetage of Nova Scotia
Preceded by Kenneth Mackenzie	Baronet (of Tarbat); 1728-1748	Succeeded by Kenneth Mackenzie
Preceded by James Mackenzie	Baronet (of Royston); 1744–1748	Succeeded by Kenneth Mackenzie
