= Duncan Davidson (Cromartyshire MP, born 1800) =

British politician (1800–1881)

Duncan Davidson of Tulloch FRSE (1800 – 18 September 1881) was a Scottish landowner, soldier and politician.

== Life ==
Davidson was born in Dorset, England, the first son of Henry Davidson of Tulloch, DL (1771–1827), and Caroline Elizabeth Diffel. He was a grandson of Duncan Davidson (1733–1799). He was educated at Harrow then studied law at the University of Edinburgh.

In 1820, he worked as a lawyer in Lincoln's Inn in London. From then until at least 1823 he lived at the family's London home at 10 Cavendish Square.

In 1827 on his father's death, he succeeded to his father's estates, including Tulloch Castle; Inchicore near Dublin; stocks and shares in various canals and the Mount Gay sugar plantation in Grenada. He then became a soldier and served as a lieutenant in the Grenadier Guards.

He represented Cromartyshire for two sessions in Parliament (1826–1830). Both terms being prior to the Scottish Reform Act 1832, he was elected by his own peers.

In 1843, he was elected a Fellow of the Royal Society of Edinburgh, his proposer being Sir George Steuart Mackenzie. He later served as Lord Lieutenant of Ross-shire from 1879 to his death, in Edinburgh on 18 September 1881.

== Family ==
He married five times: firstly in 1825 to Hon. Elizabeth Diana Bosville Macdonald (d.1839), the daughter of Godfrey Macdonald, 3rd Baron Macdonald; secondly in 1841 to Eleanora Fergusson (d.1845); thirdly in 1846 to Arabella Ross (d.1847); fourth in 1849 to Mary Mackenzie (d.1867, his longest surviving wife); lastly in 1877 to Sarah Justine Taylor (who outlived him).

He was succeeded in ownership of Tulloch Castle by his eldest son Duncan Henry Caithness Reay Davidson (1836–1889).

Parliament of the United Kingdom
| Vacant alternating constituency, with Nairnshire Title last held by Roderick Macleod (to 1820) | Member of Parliament for Cromartyshire; 1826–1830 | Vacant alternating constituency, with Nairnshire Title next held by self |
| Vacant alternating constituency, with Nairnshire Title last held by self (to 1830) | Member of Parliament for Cromartyshire; 1831–1832 | Constituency abolished |
