= Invergordon Castle =

Former castle in Highland, Scotland

Coordinates: 57.6978°N 4.1852°W

Invergordon Castle, formerly Inverbreakie Castle, was a medieval castle located in Rosskeen in Highland, Scotland. Invergordon Castle is first mentioned in sources dating to the 13th century, and was then known as Inverbreakie Castle. At the beginning of the 18th century, the estate was acquired by Sir Wm Gordon, and it was at this point that the name was changed.

The castle was destroyed in a fire. In 1872, a modern mansion was built on the site to replace the castle, but it was demolished in 1928.
