= Lord Lieutenant of Ross-shire =

Ceremonial officer in Ross-shire, Scotland

This is a list of people who have served as Lord Lieutenant of Ross-shire. The office was replaced by the Lord Lieutenant of Ross and Cromarty in 1889 through the operation of the Local Government (Scotland) Act 1889, which directed that the incumbent Lord Lieutenant of Ross-shire should automatically assume the new post.

- Francis Mackenzie, 1st Baron Seaforth 17 March 1794 – 11 January 1815
- Sir Hector Mackenzie, 4th Baronet 29 September 1815 – 26 April 1826
- Sir James Mackenzie, 5th Baronet 1 May 1826 – 8 March 1843
- Col. Hugh Duncan Baillie 21 March 1843 – 21 June 1866
- Sir James Matheson, 1st Baronet 27 June 1866 – 31 December 1878
- Duncan Davidson 18 February 1879 – 18 September 1881
- Sir Kenneth Mackenzie, 6th Baronet 2 December 1881 – 26 August 1889
- Mackenzie became Lord Lieutenant of Ross and Cromarty
