= Duncan Davidson (Cromartyshire MP, born 1733) =

British politician (1733–1799)

Duncan Davidson (1733 – 15 August 1799) was a Scottish merchant and Member of Parliament.

He was the second son of William Davidson, of Davidson in the Black Isle, and his wife Jean. His elder brother Henry purchased Tulloch Castle from their maternal grandfather, Kenneth Bayne of Knockbain, in 1762; Duncan succeeded to the estate on his brother's death in 1781.

Duncan Davidson became a junior partner in the London merchant house of George Chandler (1721–79), which traded in sugar from the Caribbean. After Chandler's death, he formed a partnership with Charles Graham (before 1757 – 1806). The partnership of Davidson & Graham, operating from Fenchurch Buildings in the City of London, prospered in the sugar trade for over a quarter of a century.

At the general election of 1790, Davidson was elected to Parliament for Cromartyshire with the support of William Pulteney, defeating Alexander Brodie who had the support of Henry Dundas. A compromise was reached whereby Davidson would hold the seat for four years before resigning in favour of a candidate to be decided by Brodie's supporters. However, once in Parliament, Davidson supported the government and Dundas agreed to his retaining the seat until the next general election.

Davidson married twice, leaving one son (Henry) by his first wife; his son carried on the family business after his father's death.

Parliament of Great Britain
| Vacant alternating constituency, with Nairnshire Title last held by George Ross | Member of Parliament for Cromartyshire; 1790–1796 | Vacant alternating constituency, with Nairnshire Title next held by Alexander Mackenzie |
