= Roderick Macleod, 4th of Cadboll =

Scottish Whig politician (1786–1853)

Roderick Macleod 4th of Cadboll (24 November 1786 – 13 March 1853) was a Scottish Whig politician. (Note: Roderick Macleod was the 4th [Macleod] of Cadboll (National Archive of Scotland staff 2012), and may be referred to as such when an authority needs to identify him from other relatives with similar names.)

== Biography ==
Macleod was the Member of Parliament (MP) for Cromartyshire from 1818 to 1820, and for Sutherland from 14 September 1831 until 1837, when he stood down from the House of Commons at the 1837 general election, and ran for the constituency of Inverness Burghs which he represented from 1837 – 21 February 1840.

Macleod was Lord Lieutenant of Cromarty from 1833 until he died. His father lived to be an old age so Macleod did not become head of the family until he was in his late 50s. He died nine years later in March 1853 and was succeeded by his eldest son, Robert Bruce Aeneas (1818–88).

== Family ==
On 10 July 1813 Macleod married Isabella, daughter of William Cunninghame, merchant, of Lainshaw. They had five children: their eldest son was Robert Bruce Aeneas (1818-1888), their younger son was Henry Dunning Macleod (1821-1902), who became a distinguished writer on political economy, and three daughters: Margaret, Elizabeth, and Anna Maria.

== Notes ==
Parliament of the United Kingdom
Vacant alternating constituency, with Nairnshire Title last held by Robert Bruce Aeneas Macleod (until 1812)	Member of Parliament for Cromartyshire; 1818–1820	Vacant alternating constituency, with Nairnshire Title next held by Duncan Davidson (from 1826)
Preceded by Sir Hugh Innes, Bt	Member of Parliament for Sutherland; 1831–1837	Succeeded by William Howard
Preceded by Charles Cumming-Bruce	Member of Parliament for Inverness Burghs; 1837–1840	Succeeded by James Morrison
