= Cromartyshire (UK Parliament constituency) =

Parliamentary constituency in the United Kingdom, 1801–1832

- Former county constituency for the House of Commons
- Subdivisions of Scotland: Cromartyshire

1708–1832
- Seats: one
- Created from: Cromartyshire
- Replaced by: Ross and Cromarty

Cromartyshire was a county constituency of the House of Commons of Great Britain from 1708 until 1800, and of the House of Commons of the United Kingdom from 1801 to 1832.

== The constituency ==
The British parliamentary constituency of Cromartyshire was created in 1708 following the Acts of Union, 1707 and replaced the former Parliament of Scotland shire constituency of Cromartyshire. Cromartyshire was paired as an alternating constituency with neighbouring Nairnshire. The freeholders of Cromartyshire elected one Member of Parliament (MP) to one Parliament, while those of Nairnshire elected a Member to the next.

== Abolition ==
The Representation of the People (Scotland) Act 1832 abolished the alternating constituencies. Cromartyshire was merged with Ross-shire to form the single constituency of Ross and Cromarty, both counties electing one Member between them to each Parliament.

== Members of Parliament ==
| Election | Member | Notes | Ref |
|---|---|---|---|
| 1708 | none | | |
| 1 November 1710 | Sir Kenneth Mackenzie | | |
| 1713 | none | | |
| 17 February 1715 | Alexander Urquhart | | |
| 1722 | none | | |
| 15 September 1727 | Sir Kenneth Mackenzie | Died on 13 September 1728. | |
| 25 March 1729 | Sir George Mackenzie | | |
| 1734 | none | | |
| 21 May 1741 | Sir William Gordon | Died on 9 June 1742. | |
| 30 December 1742 | Sir John Gordon | | |
| 1747 | none | | |
| 4 May 1754 | Sir John Gordon | | |
| 1761 | none | | |
| 26 April 1768 | William Pulteney | | |
| 1774 | none | | |
| 17 October 1780 | George Ross | | |
| 1784 | none | | |
| 8 July 1790 | Duncan Davidson | | |
| 1796 | none | | |
| 27 July 1802 | Alexander Mackenzie (from 22 July 1803, Mackenzie Fraser) | | |
| 1806 | none | | |
| 2 June 1807 | Robert Bruce Aeneas Macleod | | |
| 1812 | none | | |
| 10 July 1818 | Roderick Macleod | | |
| 1820 | none | | |
| 30 June 1826 | Duncan Davidson | | |
| 1830 | none | | |
| 20 May 1831 | Duncan Davidson | | |
