= Hilton of Cadboll Stone =

Class II Pictish stone in Scotland

Coordinates: 57.7672°N 3.8960°W

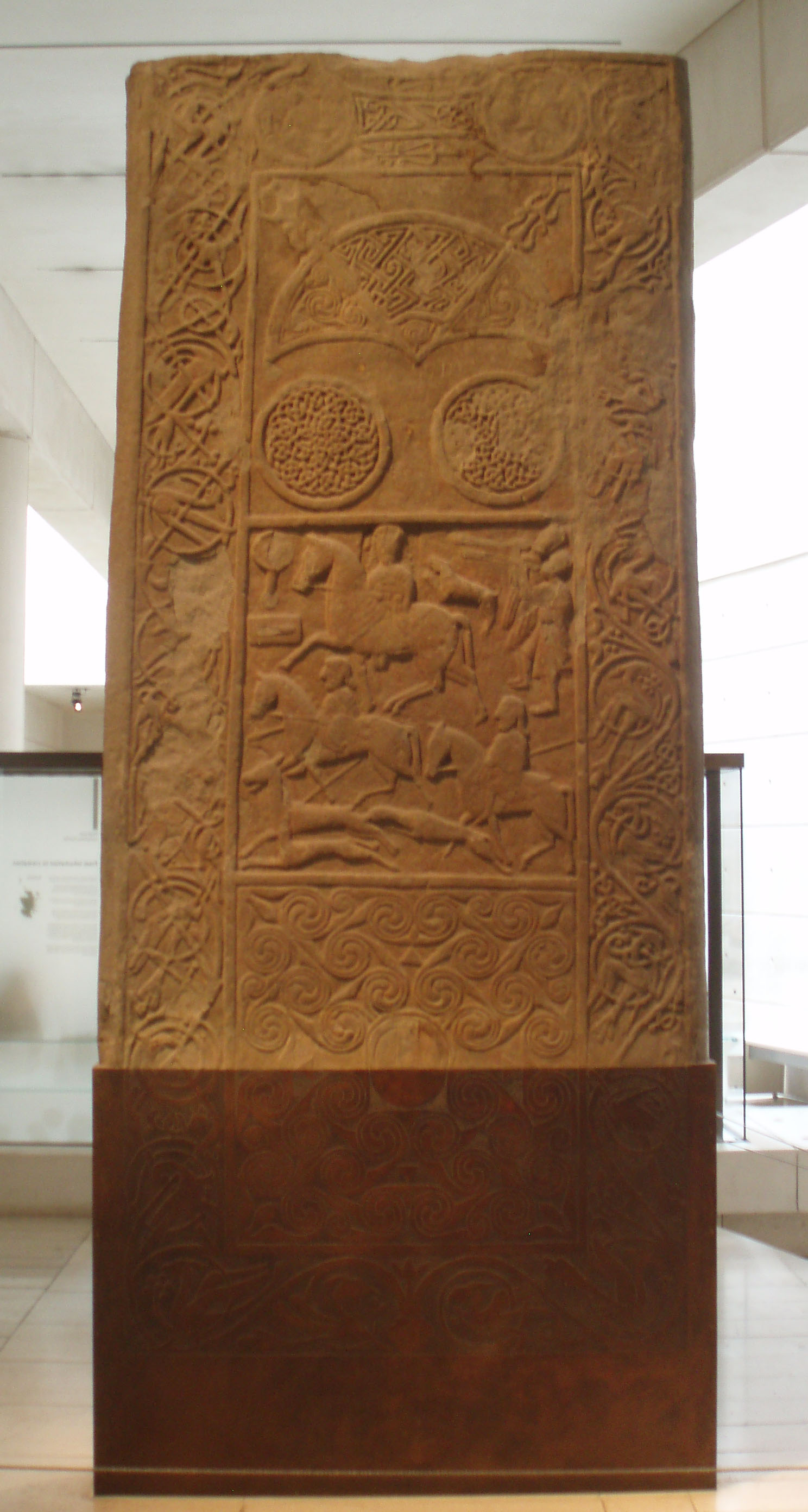
The Hilton of Cadboll stone in the National Museum of Scotland.

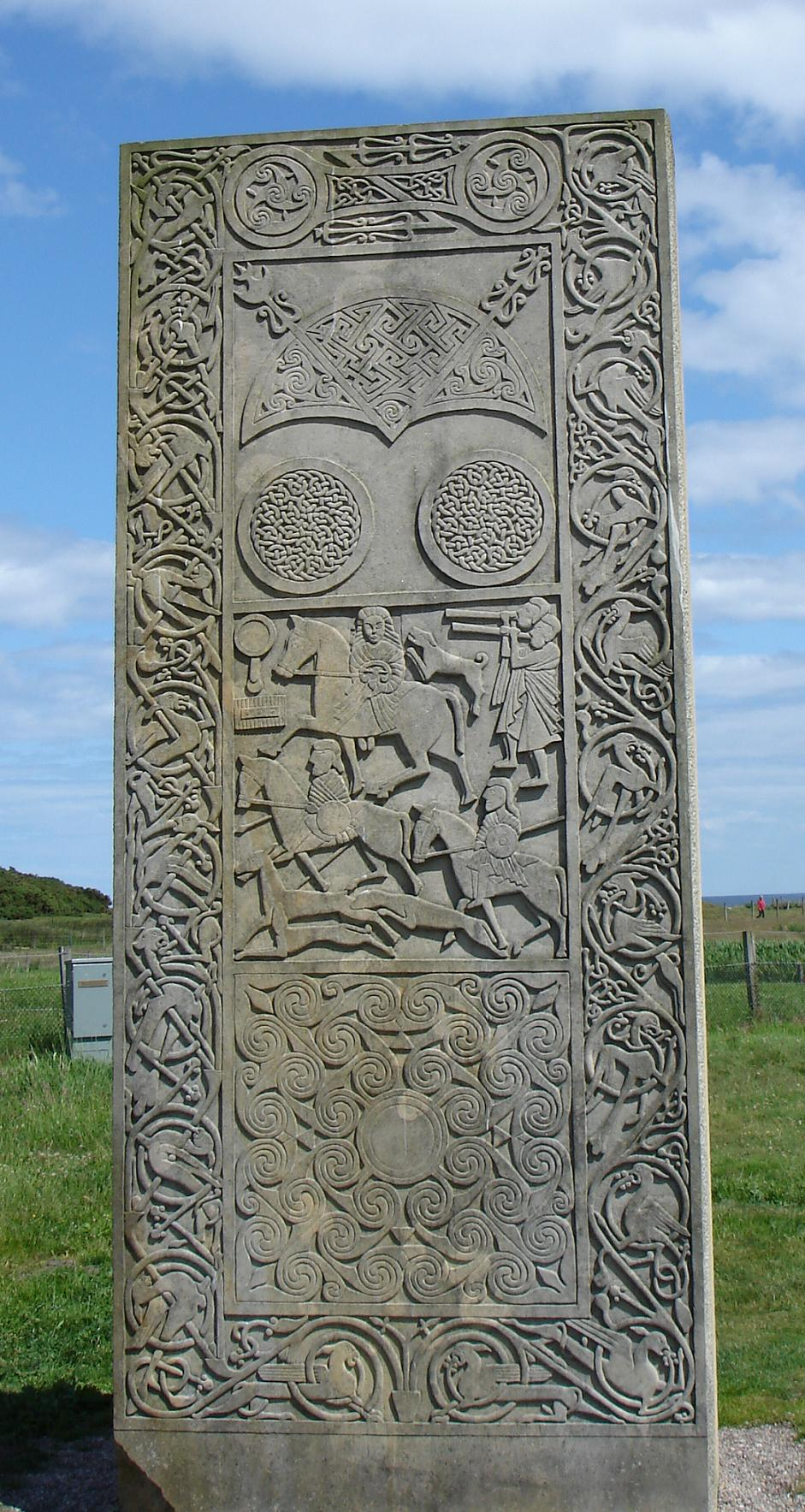
The back of the cross-slab on location in Easter Ross. This is the reconstruction by Barry Grove.

The Hilton of Cadboll Stone is one of the most magnificent of all Pictish cross-slabs. It was erected on the East coast of the Tarbat Peninsula in Easter Ross, Scotland about AD 800. It seems likely that, at the time, the entire peninsula from the mouth of the Cromarty Firth to Tarbatness was the estate of the monastery at Portmahomack and that the stone was carved at its instigation.

As with other cross-slabs, the front was a decorated cross and the back had scenes and symbols with religious significance. It was erected in a natural amphitheatre about 100m from the shore.

In the thirteenth century the Hilton of Cadboll Chapel was erected 6m to its east. More recently, the modern settlement Hilton of Cadboll has developed along the coast to its south-west.

Chips found buried at the site show that the cross-face started to be defaced in the late sixteenth century during the Scottish Reformation. In 1674 the stone was felled in a storm, with the top three-quarters breaking off. The cross on the front face was now removed completely and a memorial inscribed to Alexander Duff and his three wives.

The stone appears never to have been used as a memorial and was left at Hilton, where it was shown to visiting antiquarians including Rev. Charles Cordiner. He brought it to public attention in his book Antiquities and Scenery of the North of Scotland, London, 1780.

In the late 1860s the Macleods of Cadboll moved the top three-quarters of the stone to be a feature in the garden of Invergordon Castle. When the estate was sold in 1921, the stone was gifted to the British Museum. A rearguard action by the Scottish antiquarian establishment succeeded in deferring the Trustees' acceptance and their releasing Macleod of Cadboll from his gift so that he could redonate it to the National Museum of Antiquities of Scotland, which he did. The stone is now in the National Museum of Scotland.

The bottom quarter of the stone, below the break, remained in situ at Hilton of Cadboll. During 1998, excavation in the vicinity of the Hilton of Cadboll chapel site found fragments of carved micaceous sandstone which were surmised to be from the lost cross face of the Hilton of Cadboll stone. Further excavations in 2001 recovered further carved sandstone fragments and the missing lower portion of the cross-slab. Carved fragments have now been restored to the base and it is on display, in pristine condition, at the John Ross Visitor Centre in Balintore. A representation of the bottom quarter in copper has been added to the stone in Edinburgh, but it shows only the reverse face, and not the stepped base of the cross on the stone's front.

In the 1990s a campaign to return the stone to its original location having failed, a full-scale copy of the stone was commissioned from local sculptor Barry Grove. It was erected close to the original location with the hunting scene on the west face, so people facing it are looking to the east. The subsequent discovery of the lower portion of the original stone showed that the hunting scene was on the east face and that the west face bore a cross with a stepped base. People facing the cross would therefore face east, as in a church. In accordance with convention, the face with the cross will be referred to as the front and the face with the hunting scene as the back.

== Description and Iconography ==
On the quarter which survives of the front of the stone, there is the stepped base of a cross with bosses (similar to those on the stones at Shandwick and Nigg but with bipartite spirals). From this it is inferred that the face showed a Calvary cross. From partial reconstruction of the upper face from fragments, it is inferred that the cross was surrounded with figures concerned with Death, Judgement, Heaven and Hell.

On the back there is a vine-scroll border (representing the Eucharist) to the left, right and bottom and the Pictish symbols of double disc and Z-rod at the top. Within are three square panels:

1. In the top panel are the Pictish symbols of crescent and V-rod above two circular discs containing knotwork. Although we don't know the meanings of these symbols, their prominent position on many Class II stones has led scholars for the past 150 years to apply the rule noscitur a sociis and infer that, when they appear in the context of other Christian symbolism, they too symbolise Christian concepts.
2. The middle panel shows a hunting scene featuring a prominent person on horseback face-on. For many years this was regarded as a secular scene with the prominent person a female aristocrat (the mirror symbol at the top left of the panel indicates that the figure is female). Modern scholarship identifies the scene as a derivative of the Roman Adventus and the prominent person as either Christ or the Virgin Mary. While the object in front of the figure is usually described as a penannular brooch, an image from 1993 shows what may be a cross on a shield or badge. The deer being harried by two hounds at the bottom of the panel references Psalm 42, in which the deer is likened to the soul thirsting for salvation.
3. The bottom panel was broken in half when the stone fell in 1674 and only the top half is in the National Museum of Scotland. It is a scrollwork design featuring triskeles which has been adopted by the neighbouring whisky distillery, Glenmorangie, as its logo. After the base of the stone was discovered in 2001, the central portion of the panel was reconstructed from flakes excavated from the field of debris around the base. This showed that at its centre was a cross similar to that on the east face of the Edderton cross-slab but with equal arms and that the scrollwork design emanates from four points (NE, SE, SW, NW) on a circle surrounding the cross. The panel has now been identified as representing the four rivers of paradise springing from the cross.

Martin Goldberg has suggested that the Hilton of Cadboll cross-slab had a particular role in the Easter vigil. This was the only time in the year when new members were received into the Christian community through the rite of Baptism. The hunting scene on the back referenced Psalm 42, which was sung during the vigil as catechumens were preparing to be Baptised. Whereas the stone at Shandwick was on a bluff, that at Hilton was close to a stream and to the water table, making immersion possible.

== Archaeological Investigations in 1998 - 2003 ==
In 1998 excavation in the vicinity of the Hilton of Cadboll chapel site was undertaken by Kirkdale Archaeology (Paul Sharman and Jon Triscott) on behalf of Historic Scotland. During this work approximately 40 fragments of carved micaceous sandstone were recovered; the likely origin for these was surmised to be from the lost cross face of the Hilton of Cadboll stone.

Subsequently, in 2001, Historic Scotland commissioned Kirkdale Archaeology (Dave Murray, Stuart Jeffrey, Meggen Gondek, and Angus Mackintosh) to undertake a further excavation. Assisted by Barry Grove, a further 740 carved sandstone fragments, and 122 possibly carved fragments, were recovered. In addition, the missing lower portion of the cross-slab was discovered (by Angus Mackintosh), but left in-situ.

Later in 2001 the lower portion of the cross-slab, along with several thousand more carved fragments, was recovered by Glasgow University Archaeological Research Division (GUARD) during an excavation funded by Historic Scotland. The presence and distribution of these fragments suggests that the original intention had been to dig out the entire stone and that, possibly many years after this had failed, defacing of the cross began in situ. In a storm the stone fell towards the chapel, breaking as it fell and leaving the cross-face uppermost. Defacing later continued with the stone now on the ground.

Analysis of these fragments led to the reconstruction of parts of the lost cross-face. Together with the now-lifted lower portion of the slab this enabled Isabel Henderson to use art-historical analysis to infer the iconography of the cross-face. This informed Barry Grove's carving of the front of the modern copy during 2003-5.

Following some controversy, it was accepted that ownership of the lower portion of the original cross-slab lay with the National Museum of Scotland but that it should be displayed in Hilton of Cadboll village hall rather than joining the upper portion in Edinburgh. In parallel with the excavation, Historic Scotland also funded research carried out by Professor Sian Jones of the University of Manchester into the significance of Early Medieval Sculpture to local communities which concentrated on the historical fragmentation and movement of the Hilton of Cadboll monument as well its modern role in the production of meaning, value and place, The excavation and subsequent analysis of the 'biography' of the monument was the foundation of a major monograph published by the Society of Antiquaries of Scotland in 2008. The digital elements of the excavation archive were deposited with the Archaeology Data Service.

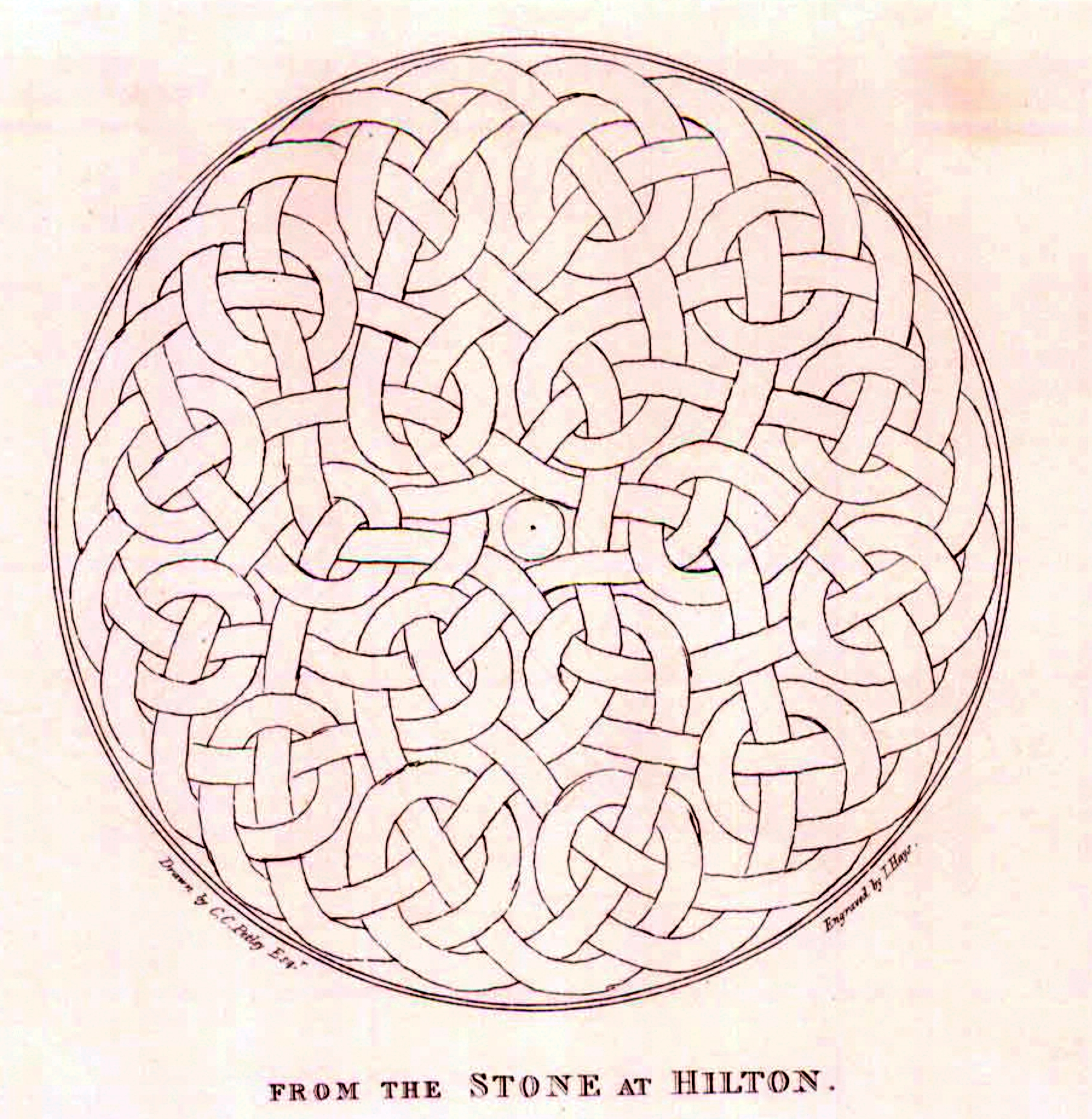
Sketch by C.C. Petley, showing detail of the knotwork.

Only one skeleton was fully excavated and removed; the others remained undisturbed throughout the duration of the fieldwork. The burials contained various types of pottery and some stones with an unknown glaze on the surface. Several metatarsals were removed for radiocarbon dating, but were returned to the site once testing was complete.

Ten soil samples were taken from the site which appeared to contain charcoal or other evidence about the environment. These samples were subjected to optically stimulated luminescence (OSL) dating coupled with the analysis of the stratigraphy in order to establish the age and content of the soil. Five distinct levels were discovered in the soil which date from 9th century to present day.
