= Ross, Scotland =

Traditional region of Scotland

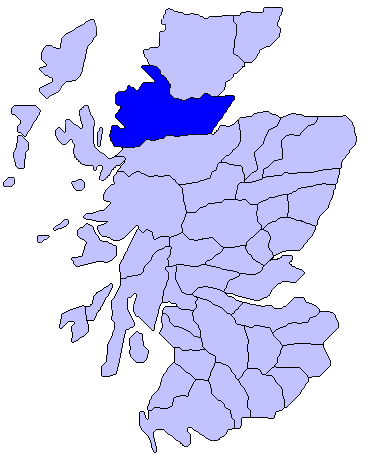
Map of Scotland showing the historic district of Ross

Ross (Scottish Gaelic: Ros) is an area of Scotland. It was first recorded in the tenth century as a province. It was claimed by the Scottish crown in 1098, and from the 12th century Ross was an earldom. From 1661 there was a county of Ross, also known as Ross-shire, covering most but not all of the province, in particular excluding Cromartyshire. Cromartyshire was subsequently merged with the county of Ross in 1889 to form the county of Ross and Cromarty. The area is now part of the Highland council area.

The western and eastern parts of Ross are known as Wester Ross and Easter Ross. Wester Ross is sparsely populated, containing part of the Northwest Highlands mountains and having extensive sea lochs along its coast onto the Minch. Easter Ross has a coast onto the Moray Firth. Ross's main towns are Dingwall (which was the county town of Ross-shire), Cromarty, Fortrose, Invergordon and Tain, all of which lie on its eastern coast. Cromarty and Fortrose are on the Black Isle peninsula.

Ross gave its name to the medieval Diocese of Ross, which was based at Fortrose Cathedral. The name Ross is still used by the Church of Scotland for the Presbytery of Ross.

== Toponymy ==
The name Ross may derive from a Gaelic word meaning "headland", perhaps a reference to the Black Isle. Another possible origin is the West Norse word for Orkney – Hrossey – meaning horse island.

== History ==
Excavations of a rock shelter and shell midden at Sand, Applecross on the coast of Wester Ross have shown that the coast was occupied by Mesolithic hunter-gatherers.

Ptolemy's 2nd century Geography lists a tribe called the Decantae occupying the area that would later become Easter Ross. It may be doubted whether the Romans ever effected even a temporary settlement in the area of the modern county. In Roman times, and for long afterwards, the land was occupied by Picts, who, in the 6th and 7th centuries, were converted to Christianity by followers of Saint Columba. Throughout the next three centuries the natives were continually harassed by Norwegian Viking raiders, of whose presence tokens have survived in several place-names (Dingwall, Tain, and others). At this time the country formed part of the Province of Moray (Latin: Moravia), which then extended as far as the Dornoch Firth and the River Oykel.

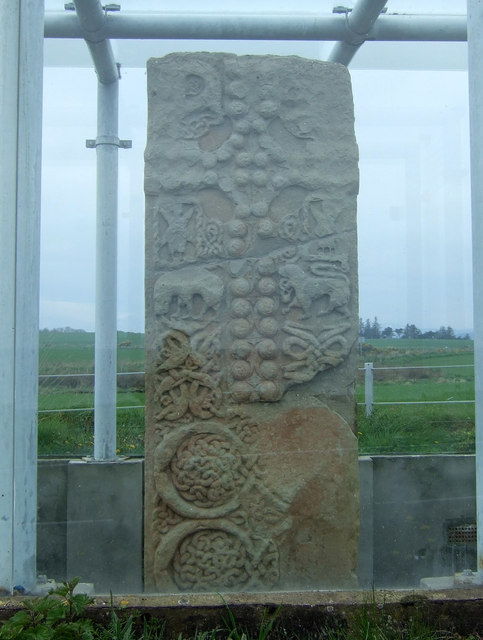
Clach a' Charridh, a Pictish stone near Shandwick

The principal relics of antiquity—mainly stone circles, cairns and forts—appear in the eastern district. A vitrified fort crowns the hill of Knockfarrel in the parish of Fodderty, and there is a circular dun near the village of Lochcarron. Some fine examples of sculptured stones occur, especially those that, according to tradition, mark the burial-place of the three sons of a Danish king who were shipwrecked off the coast of Nigg. The largest and handsomest of these three crosses—the Clach a' Charridh, or Stone of Lamentation—stands at Shandwick. It is about 10 feet (3 m) high and contains representations of the martyrdom of St Andrew and figures of an elephant and dog. It fell during a storm in 1847 and was broken into three pieces, two of which were joined back together and re-erected; it is now preserved in a glass pavilion. On the top of the cross in Nigg churchyard are two figures with outstretched arms in the act of supplication; the dove descends between them, and below are two dogs. The cross was knocked down by the fall of the belfry in 1725, but has been riveted together. The third stone formerly stood at Hilton of Cadboll, but was removed for security to the grounds of Invergordon Castle.

Among old castles are those of Loch Slin Castle, in the parish of Fearn, said to date from the 13th century; Ballone Castle, in the parish of Tarbat, once a stronghold of the Earls of Ross; the remains of Dingwall Castle, their original seat; and Eilean Donan in Loch Alsh, which was blown up by British warships during the abortive Jacobite rising in 1719.

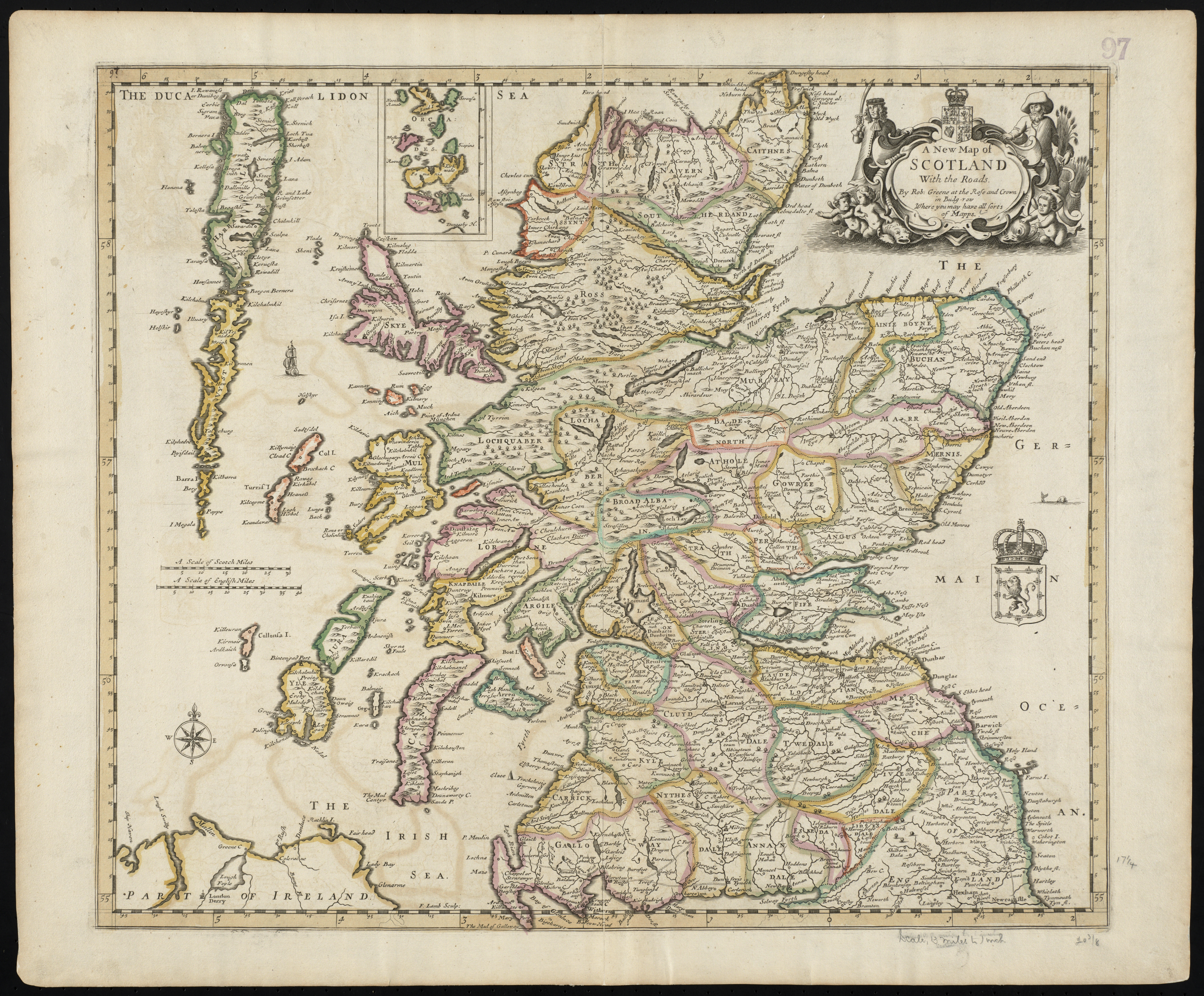
Map of Scottish provinces in 1689, including Ross

Ross is first recorded as a territorial unit in a hagiography of the Scottish-born saint Cathróe of Metz, written in Metz shortly after the saint's death between 971 and 976. Ross appears to have been separated from Moray during the 10th century, with the boundary between them generally following the River Beauly. The Scottish crown claimed the overlordship of Ross and neighbouring Caithness (which then included Sutherland) from Norway in 1098, but the process of establishing effective Scottish authority over the area took many years. Whereas Moray to the south was divided into shires (areas administered by a sheriff) during the 12th century, Ross and Caithness at that time were placed under the nominal jurisdiction of the Sheriff of Inverness (one of the three sheriffdoms created covering the province of Moray) rather than being given their own sheriffs.

By the mid-13th century there were sheriffs at Cromarty and Dingwall, both within the province of Ross, but each appears to have had only a small area of jurisdiction around those towns, rather than the larger territories usually given to sheriffs. The Sheriff of Inverness was therefore still responsible for most of Ross and Caithness. The position of Sheriff of Dingwall did not endure.

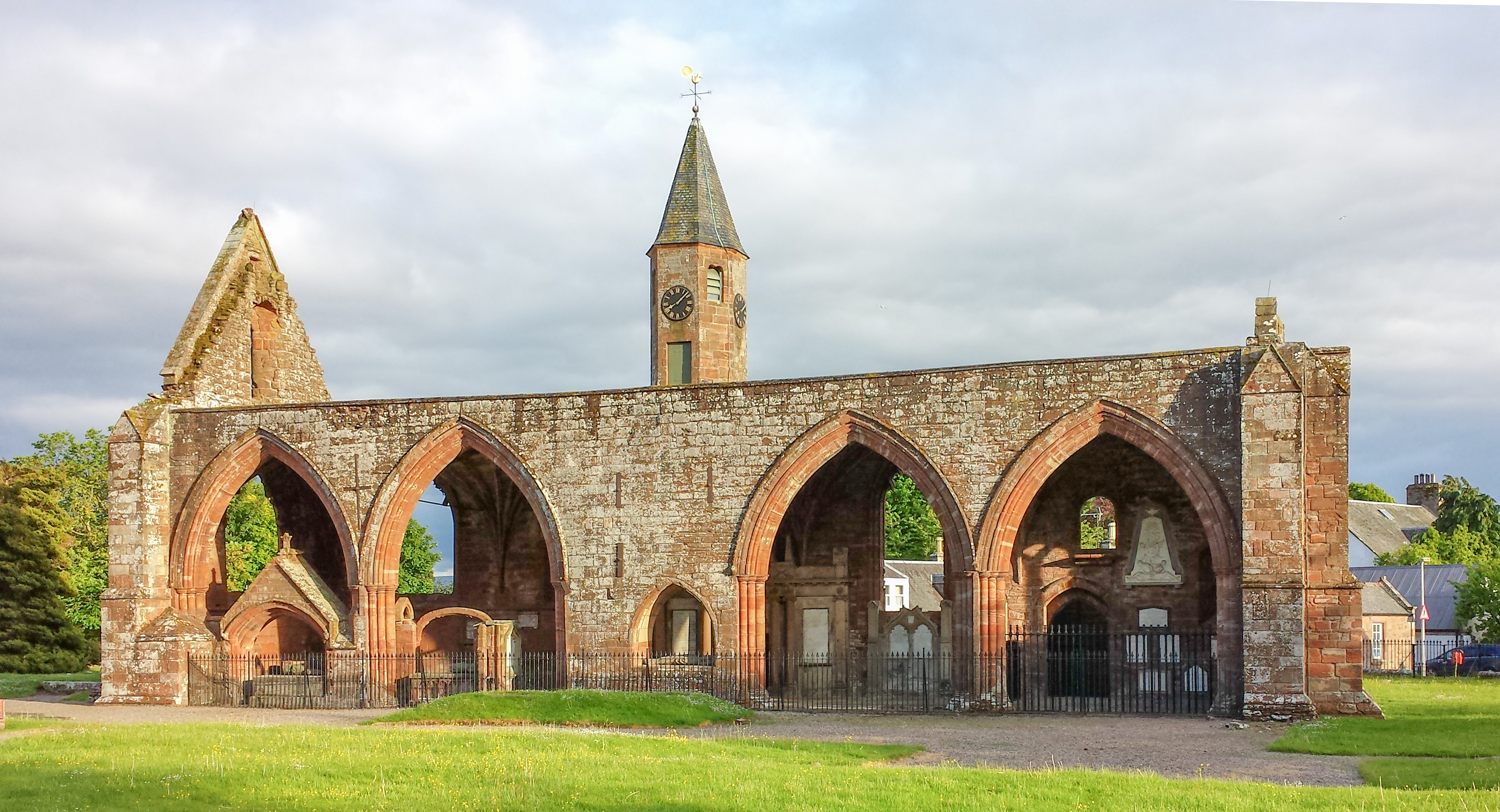
Ruins of Fortrose Cathedral, seat of the Diocese of Ross from the 13th century

The Diocese of Ross was in existence by the mid-12th century, and by the 13th century it was based at Fortrose Cathedral.

The title of Mormaer or Earl of Ross was created several times from the mid-12th century. William, the 4th Earl of Ross, was present with his clan at the Battle of Bannockburn (1314), and almost a century later (1412) the castle of Dingwall, the chief seat on the mainland of Donald, Lord of the Isles, was captured by Donald just before the battle of Harlaw in Aberdeenshire, which Donald fought because the ambitious Stewarts, governing in the absence of James I, rejected his wife Mariota's rightful claim to the earldom. After the battle, the people of Ross embraced Donald and Mariota as rightful rulers of the earldom notwithstanding the Duke of Albany (a Stewart) purporting to give it to his son. Donald died in 1423 and in 1424 the earldom reverted to the crown, but James I soon afterwards restored it to Mariota, wife of Donald Macdonald, and the heiress of the earldom. She was the mother of Alexander Macdonald, Lord of the Isles, who thus became the 11th Earl.

In consequence, however, of the treason of John Macdonald, 4th and last Lord of the Isles and 12th Earl of Ross, the earldom was again vested in the crown (1476). Five years later James III bestowed it on his second son, James Stewart, whom he also created Duke of Ross in 1488.

By the 16th century the whole area of the county was occupied by different clans. The Rosses held what is now Easter Ross; the Munros the small tract around Ben Wyvis, including Dingwall; the Macleods Lewis, and, in the mainland, the district between Loch Maree and Loch Torridon; the Macdonalds of Glengarry, Coigach, and the district between Strome Ferry and Kyle of Lochalsh, and the Mackenzies the remainder.

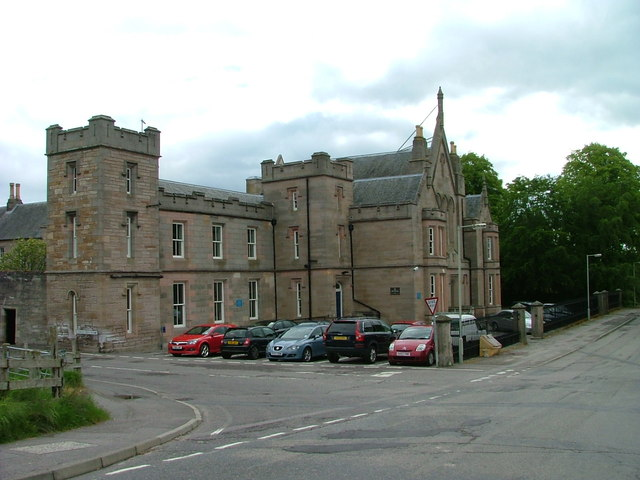
Dingwall Sheriff Court, built 1845: Ross-shire's main courthouse and meeting place of the county's Commissioners of Supply and the subsequent Ross and Cromarty County Council created in 1890

The shire of Inverness was further enlarged in the 15th century to take in the Outer Hebrides and some of the Inner Hebrides (notably Skye) when the Lordship of the Isles was fully absorbed into the kingdom of Scotland. An act of parliament in 1504 acknowledged that the shire of Inverness was too big for the effective administration of justice, and so declared Ross and Caithness to be separate shires. In the event, that act was not put into effect as far as Ross was concerned. A subsequent act in 1661 finally separated Ross from Inverness-shire. The new shire of Ross also included the northern Outer Hebrides, notably the Isle of Lewis, which was owned by Kenneth Mackenzie, 3rd Earl of Seaforth, a major landowner in Ross. The shire of Ross excluded the small area of Cromartyshire, which just covered the area around the town itself at that time.

Apart from occasional conflicts between rival clans, the only battles in the county were at Invercarron, at the head of Dornoch Firth, when Montrose was crushed by Colonel Archibald Strachan on 27 April 1650; and at Glenshiel, where the Jacobites, under the Earl of Seaforth, aided by Spaniards, were defeated by a force under the command of General Joseph Wightman on 10 June 1719.

In the late 17th century, Cromartyshire was significantly enlarged to take over numerous separate tracts of land across Ross-shire. Despite many being some distance from Cromarty itself, they were owned by George Mackenzie, Viscount of Tarbat, who owned the barony of Cromarty and wanted all his lands to be in the same shire. From 1747 onwards Ross-shire and Cromartyshire shared a sheriff, but the two counties remained separate, having their own Lord-lieutenants and Commissioners of Supply, until they were united into the single county of Ross and Cromarty in 1889. With all of Cromartyshire having been part of the medieval province of Ross, the new county of Ross and Cromarty covered broadly the same area as the old province of Ross, but with the addition of the Isle of Lewis.

== Geography ==
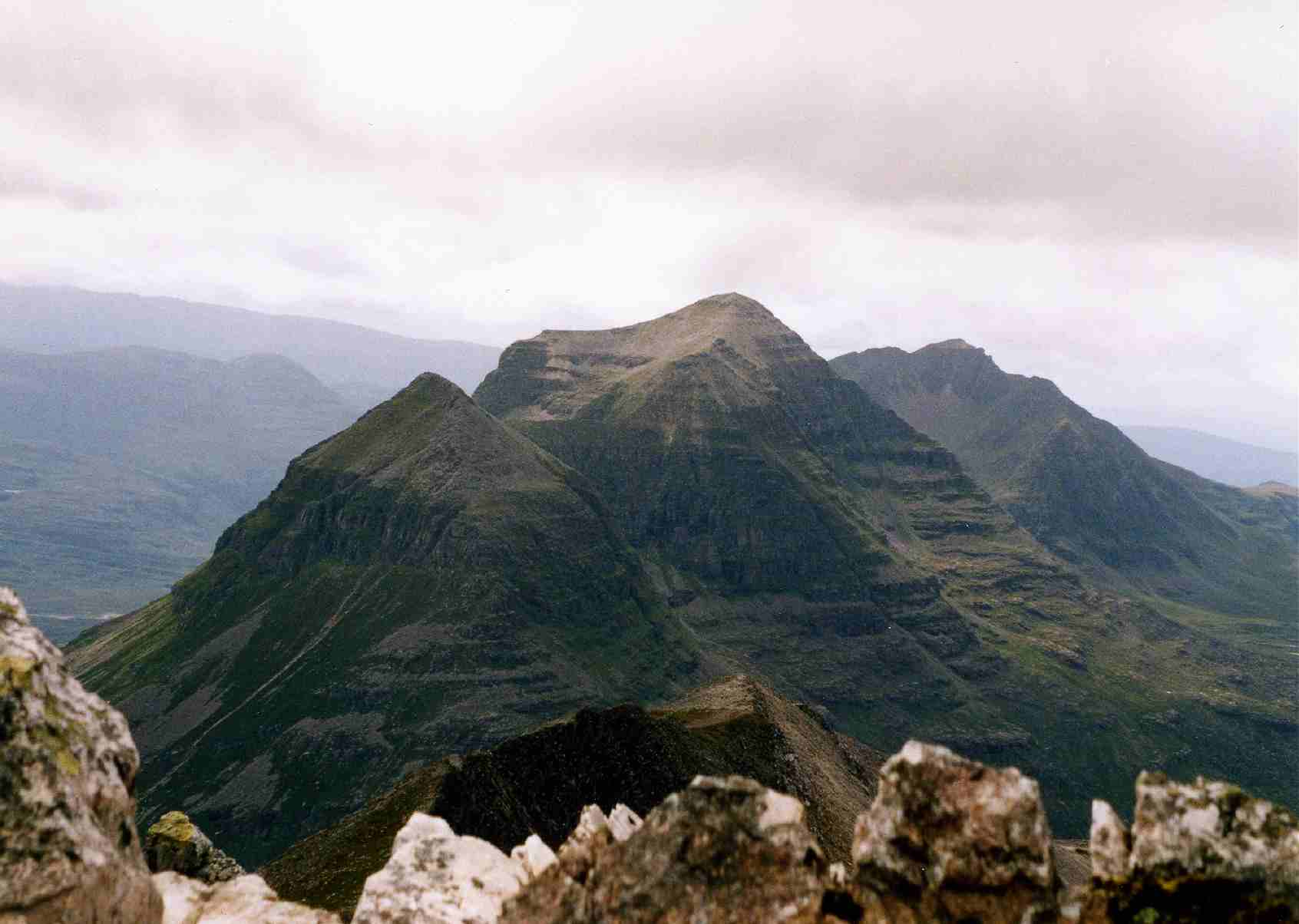
Liathach seen from Beinn Eighe. With the Munro “Top“ of Stuc a' Choire Dhuibh Bhig (915 metres) in the foreground and the two Munro summits in the background.

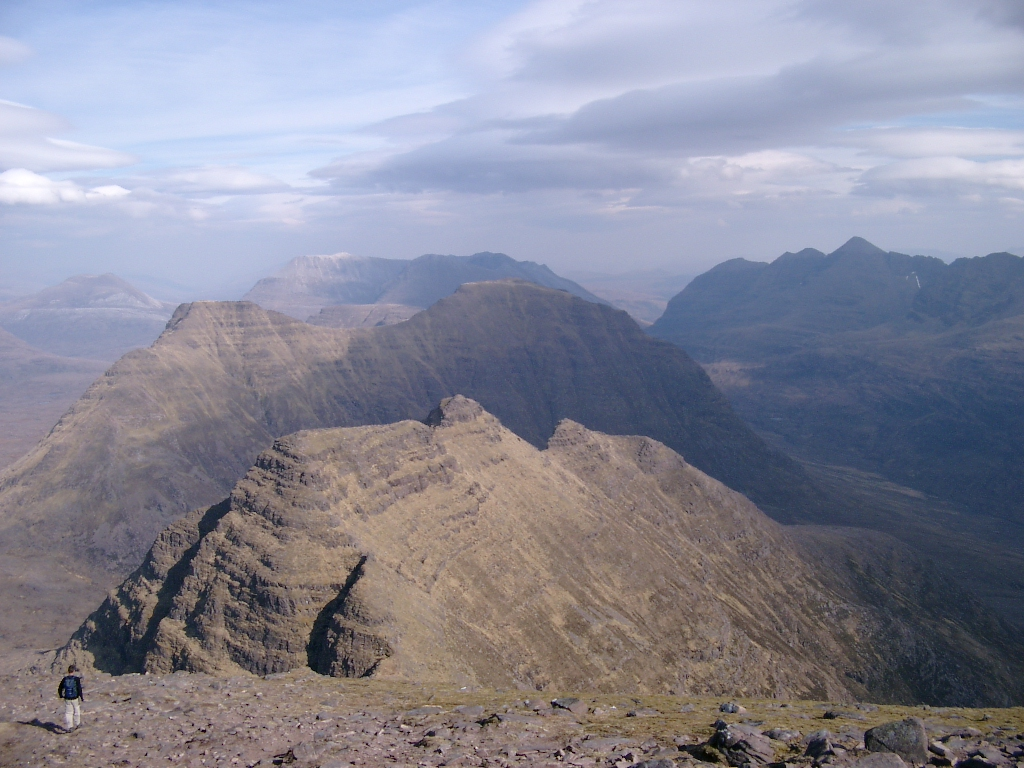
View east from Sgurr Mhòr over the "Horns" of Beinn Alligin

Ross lies south of Sutherland and the Dornoch Firth, west of the North Sea and the Moray Firth, north of the Beauly Firth and Inverness-shire and east of The Minch. There are also a number of small islands off the area's west coast, among which are:

- Gillean (lighthouse) in the parish of Lochalsh
- Crowlin Islands in Applecross
- Eilean Horrisdale, and Isle of Ewe in Gairloch parish
- Isle Martin and Tanera More, of the Summer Isles group in the parish of Lochbroom

The area of the mainland is 1,572,332 acres (636,300 hectares).

On the North Sea (eastern) side of the county the major firths are the Beauly Firth and the (Inner) Moray Firth, which separate the Black Isle from Inverness-shire; the Cromarty Firth, which bounds the districts of Easter Ross and the Black Isle; the Moray Firth, separating Easter Ross from Nairnshire; and the Dornoch Firth, dividing north-east Ross from Sutherland.

On the Atlantic (western) coastline—which has a length of nearly 311 miles (501 kilometres)—the principal sea lochs and bays, from south to north, are Loch Duich, Loch Alsh, Loch Carron, Loch Kishorn, Loch Torridon, Loch Shieldaig, Upper Loch Torridon, Gair Loch, Loch Ewe, Gruinard Bay, Loch Broom and Enard Bay.

The chief capes include Tarbat Ness on the east coast, and Coigach, Greenstone Point, Rubha Reidh, Redpoint and Hamha Point on the west.

Almost all the southern boundary with Inverness-shire consists of a rampart of peaks, many of them Munros:

- An Riabhachan (3,704 ft or 1,129 m),
- Sgurr na Lapaich (3,773 ft or 1,150 m),
- Carn Eige (Càrn Eighe) (3,881 ft or 1,183 m),
- Mam Sodhail (Mam Soul) (3,871 ft or 1,180 m),
- Beinn Fhada (Ben Attow) (3,386 ft or 1,032 m),
- Sgurr Fhuaran (3,504 ft or 1,068 m),
- The Saddle (3,317 ft or 1,011 m).

To the north of Glen Torridon are the masses of Liathach (3,455 ft or 1,053 m), Beinn Eighe (3,313 ft or 1,010 m), Beinn Alligin (3,235 ft or 986 m) and Beinn Dearg (2,998 ft or 914 m). On the northeastern shore of Loch Maree rises Slioch (3,219 ft or 981 m), while the Fannich group contains six Munros, the highest being Sgurr Mor (3,645 ft or 1,111 m). The immense isolated bulk of Ben Wyvis (3,428 ft or 1,045 m), forms the most noteworthy feature in the north-east, and An Teallach (3,484 ft or 1,062 m) in the north-west appears equally conspicuous, though less solitary. Only a small fraction of the west and south of the area is under 1,000 ft (300 m) in height. Easter Ross and the peninsula of the Black Isle are comparatively level.

The longest stream of the mainland portion of Ross and Cromarty is the River Orrin, which rises from the slopes of An Sidhean (2,671 ft or 814 m) and pursues a north-easterly course to its confluence with the River Conon after a run of about 26 mi (42 km), a small part of which forms the boundary with Inverness-shire. At Aultgowrie the stream rushes through a narrow gorge where the drop is considerable enough to make the Falls of Orrin. The River Blackwater flows from mountains in Strathvaich southeast for 18 mi (29 km) until it joins the Conon, forming soon after it leaves Loch Garve the small but picturesque Falls of Rogie. Within a short distance of its exit from Loch Luichart the Conon pours over a series of cascades and rapids and then pursues a winding course of 12 mi (19 km), mainly eastward to the head of the Cromarty Firth. Situated above Glen Elchaig in the southwest of the region are the Falls of Glomach. The stream giving rise to them drains a series of small lochs on the northern flanks of Beinn Fhada (Ben Attow) and, in an almost unbroken sheet over a metre in width, effects a sheer drop of 110 m, and soon afterwards ends its course in Glen Elchaig. The falls are usually visited from Invershiel 11 km to the south-west. 12 miles south-east of Ullapool, on the estate of Braemore, are the Falls of Measach, formed by the Droma, a headstream of the River Broom. The cascades, three in number, are close to Corrieshalloch Gorge. The River Oykel, throughout its course, forms the boundary with Sutherland.

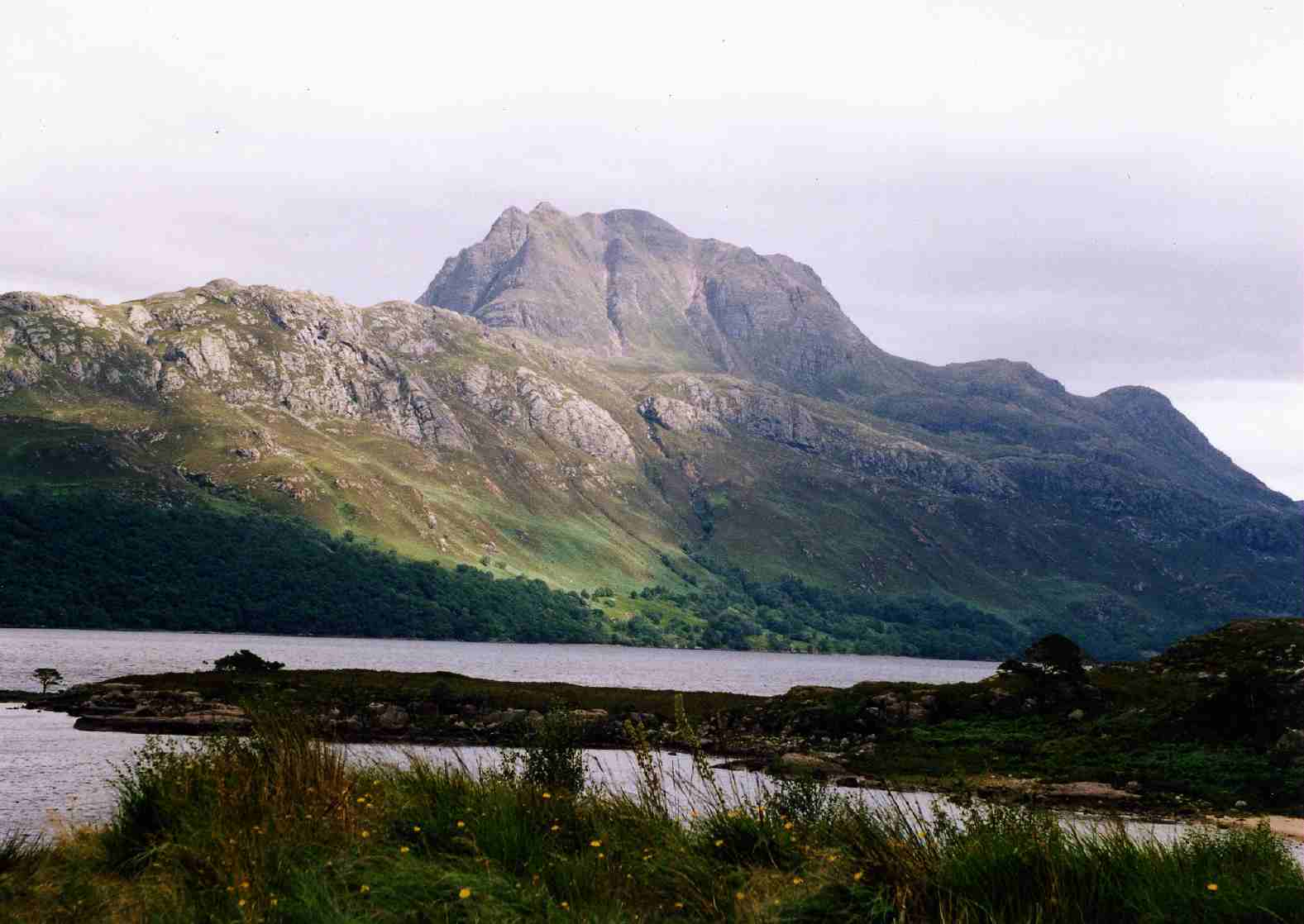
Slioch seen from the shores of Loch Maree

There are many freshwater lochs, the largest being Loch Maree. In the far north-west, 243 ft (74 m) above the sea, lies Loch Sionascaig, a loch of such irregularity of outline that it has a shore-line of 17 mi (27 km). It contains several wooded islands, and drains into Enard Bay by the River Polly. Lochan Fada (the long loch), 1,000 ft (300 m) above the sea, is 4 mi (6 km) in length, and covers an area of 1,112 acres (450 ha), and is 42 fathoms (77 m) deep, with a mean depth of 17 fathoms (31 m). Once drained by the Muice (Allt na Muice), it has been tapped a little farther west by the Abhainn na Fhasaigh, which has lowered the level of the loch. Other lochs are Fionn Loch (the white or clear lake), 8 mi (13 km) long by 1 mi (2 km) wide, famous for its herons, Loch Luichart towards the centre of the area (8 miles long and between 1/2–1 mi (0.8–1.6 km) wide), fringed with birches and having the shape of a crescent, the mountain-girt Loch Fannich (1 mi or 1.6 km wide); and the wild narrow Lochs Monar (4 mi or 6 km long) and Mullardoch (5 mi or 8 km long), on the Inverness-shire boundary.

Of the straths or valleys, the more important run from the centre eastwards, such as Strathconon, Strathbran, Strathgarve, Strathpeffer and Strathcarron. Excepting Glen Orrin, in the east central district, the longer glens lie in the south and towards the west. In the extreme south Glen Shiel runs between five mountains (the Five Sisters of Kintail) to its mouth on Loch Duich. The A87 passes down the glen. Further north lie Glen Elchaig, Glen Carron, and Glen Torridon. The railway from Dingwall runs through Glen Carron to Kyle of Lochalsh.

== Geology ==
The central portion of this county is occupied by the younger highland schists or Dalradian series. These consist of quartzites, mica-schists, garnetiferous mica-schists and gneisses, all with a gentle inclination towards the southeast. On the eastern side of the county the Dalradian schists are covered unconformably by the Old Red Sandstone. The boundary runs southward from Edderton on Dornoch Firth, by Strathpeffer, to the neighborhood of Beauly. These rocks comprise red flags and sandstones, grey bituminous flags and shales. An anticlinal fold with a southwest–northeast axis brings up the basal beds of the series about the mouth of Cromarty Firth and exposes once more the schists in The Sutors (The Sutors of Cromarty) guarding the entrance to the firth. The western boundary of the younger schist is formed by the great pre-Cambrian dislocation line that traverses the county in a fairly direct course from Elphin on the north by Ullapool to Glencarron. Most of the area west of the line of disturbance is covered by Torridonian Sandstone, mainly dark reddish sandstones, grits and shales, resting unconformably on the ancient Lewisian gneiss with horizontal or slightly inclined bedding. The unconformity is well exposed on the shores of Gairloch, Loch Maree and Loch Torridon. These rocks, which attain a considerable thickness and are divisible into three sub-groups, build up the mountain districts of Applecross, Coigach and elsewhere.

Within the Torridonian tract the older Lewisian gneiss occupies large areas north of Coigach, on the east of Enard Bay, between Gruinard Bay and Loch Maree. Between the last named and Gairloch, on both sides of middle Loch Torridon and at many other spots smaller patches appear. The Lewisian gneiss is everywhere penetrated by basic dikes, generally with a northwest–southeast direction; some of these are of great breadth. The Torridonian rocks are succeeded unconformably by a series of Cambrian strata confined to a variable but narrow belt west of the line of main thrusting. This belt of Cambrian rocks has suffered an enormous amount of subordinate thrusting. It is composed of the following subdivisions in ascending order: falsebedded quartzite, Pipe Rock quartzite, fucoid beds and Olenellus band, serpulite grit, Durness dolomite and marble, Durness dolomite and limestone: but these are not always visible at any one spot. So great has been the disturbance in the region of thrusting that in some places, as in the neighborhood of Loch Kishorn and elsewhere, the rocks have been completely overturned and the ancient gneiss has been piled upon the Torridonian.

On the shore of Moray Firth at Rathie a small patch of Kimeridge shale occurs, and beneath the cliffs of Shandwick there is a little Lower Oolite with a thin seam of coal. Glacial striae are found upon the mountains up to heights of 3,300 ft (1,000 m), and much boulder clay is found in the valleys and spread over large areas in the eastern districts. Raised beaches occur at up to 108 ft (33 m) or so above the present sea-level; they are well seen in Loch Carron.

== Climate and agriculture ==
The west coast has high rainfall: an annual average of 1,281 mm (50.42 in) at Loch Broom and 1,600 mm (62 in) at Strome Ferry (autumn and winter being the wettest seasons), but on the east coast the annual average is only 690 mm (27 in). The average daily maximum temperature for the year is 8.1 °C (46.5 °F). Average daily maxima for January and July are 3 °C (38 °F) and 14 °C (57 °F) respectively.

The most fertile tracts lie on the eastern coast, especially in Easter Ross and the Black Isle, where the soil varies from a light sandy gravel to a rich deep loam. As of 1911, among grain crops oats were most generally cultivated, but barley and wheat were also raised. Turnips and potatoes were the chief green crops. The higher land contains much good pasturage, with many sheep, blackfaced being the principal breed. Most of the horses, principally half-breds between the old garrons (hardy, serviceable, small animals) and Clydesdales, were maintained for the purposes of agriculture. The herds of cattle, mainly native Highland or crosses, were large, many of them supplying the London market. Pigs were reared, though in smaller numbers than formerly, most generally by the crofters.

As of 1911 about 800,000 acres (300,000 hectares) were devoted to deer forests, a greater area than in any other county in Scotland, among the largest being Achnashellach with 50,000 acres (20,000 hectares), Fannich with 20,000 acres (8,000 hectares), Kinlochluichart with 20,600 acres (8,340 hectares), Braemore with 40,000 acres (20,000 hectares), Inchbae with 21,000 acres (8,500 hectares) and Dundonnell with 23,000 acres (9,300 hectares). At one time the area under wood must have been remarkable, if we accept the common derivation of the word "Ross" as from the Old Irish ros, a wood, and there was until recent times a considerable extent of native woodland, principally pine, oak, ash and alder.

The fauna was noteworthy. Red and roe deer abounded, and foxes and alpine hares were common, while badgers and wild cats were occasionally trapped. Winged game was plentiful, and amongst birds of prey the golden eagle and osprey occurred. Waterfowl of all kinds frequented the sea lochs. Many rivers and lochs were rich in salmon and trout, and the pearl mussel was found in the bed of the Conon.

== Bibliography ==
- Evans, Nicholas (2019). "A historical introduction to the northern Picts". In Noble, Gordon; Evans, Nicholas (eds.). The King in the North: The Pictish realms of Fortriu and Ce. Collected essays written as part of the University of Aberdeen's Northern Picts project. Edinburgh: Birlinn. pp. 10–38. ISBN 9781780275512.
- Grant, Alexander (2012). "The Province of Ross and the Kingdom of Alba". In Cowan, Edward J.; McDonald, R. Andrew (eds.). Celtic Scotland in the Middle Ages. Edinburgh: John Donald. pp. 88–126. ISBN 9781906566579.
- History of the Mackenzies, with genealogies of the principal families of the name at Project Gutenberg
