= Seaboard Villages =

Coordinates: 57.75657°N 3.91069°W

The Seaboard Villages (Scottish Gaelic: Na Trì Port Mara) are three contiguous coastal villages, situated about 10 km southeast of the town of Tain in Easter Ross, Scotland. They face east onto the Moray Firth.

The villages are (from north to south):

- Hilton of Cadboll - which has the pier
- Balintore - which has the harbour and the community centre
- Shandwick - which has the bay
