= Clach a' Charridh =

Pictish stone in Easter Ross, Scotland

Coordinates: 57°44′51″N 3°55′29″W

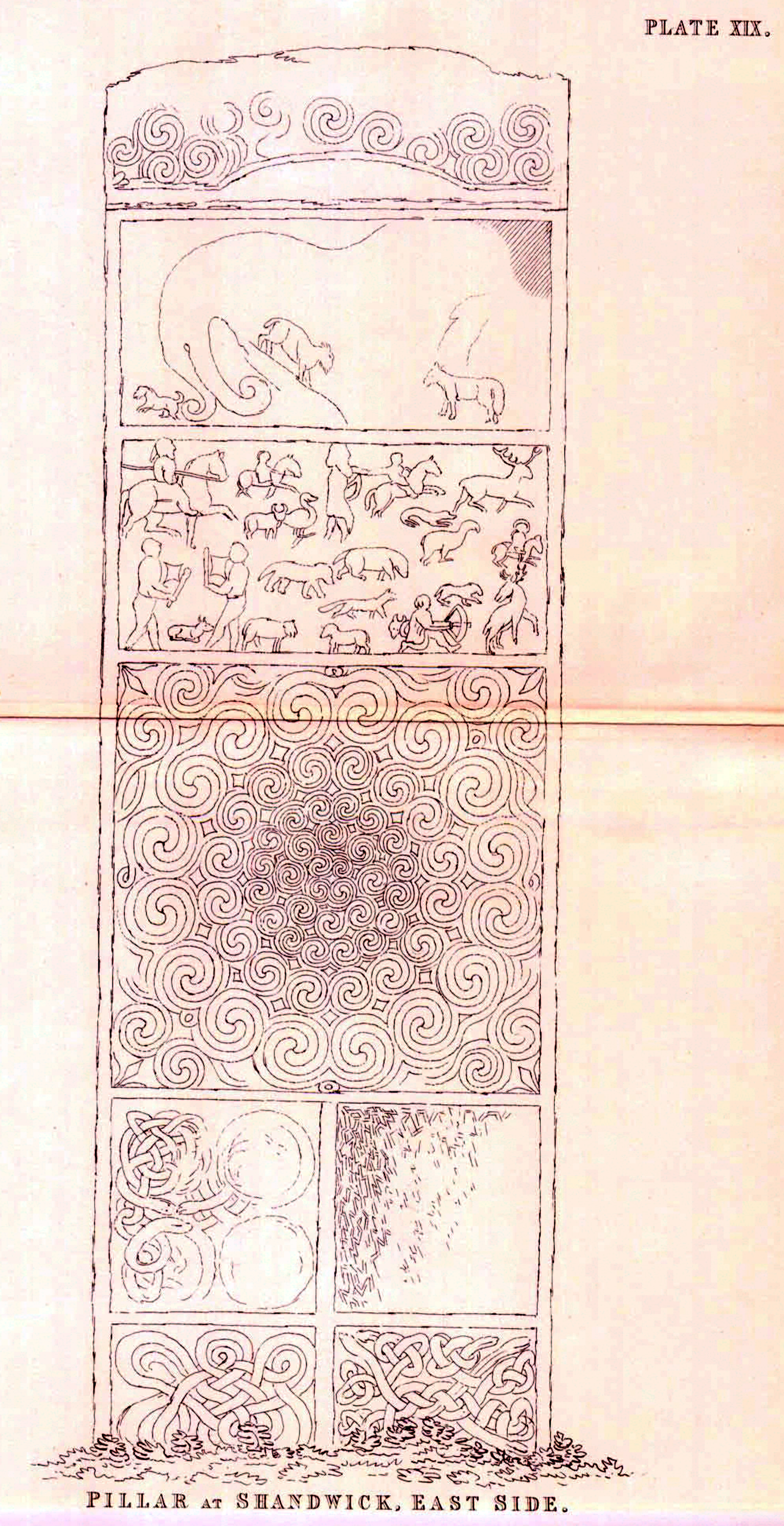
Reverse side. This was drawn by Charles Petley in 1811–12 and published in 1857.

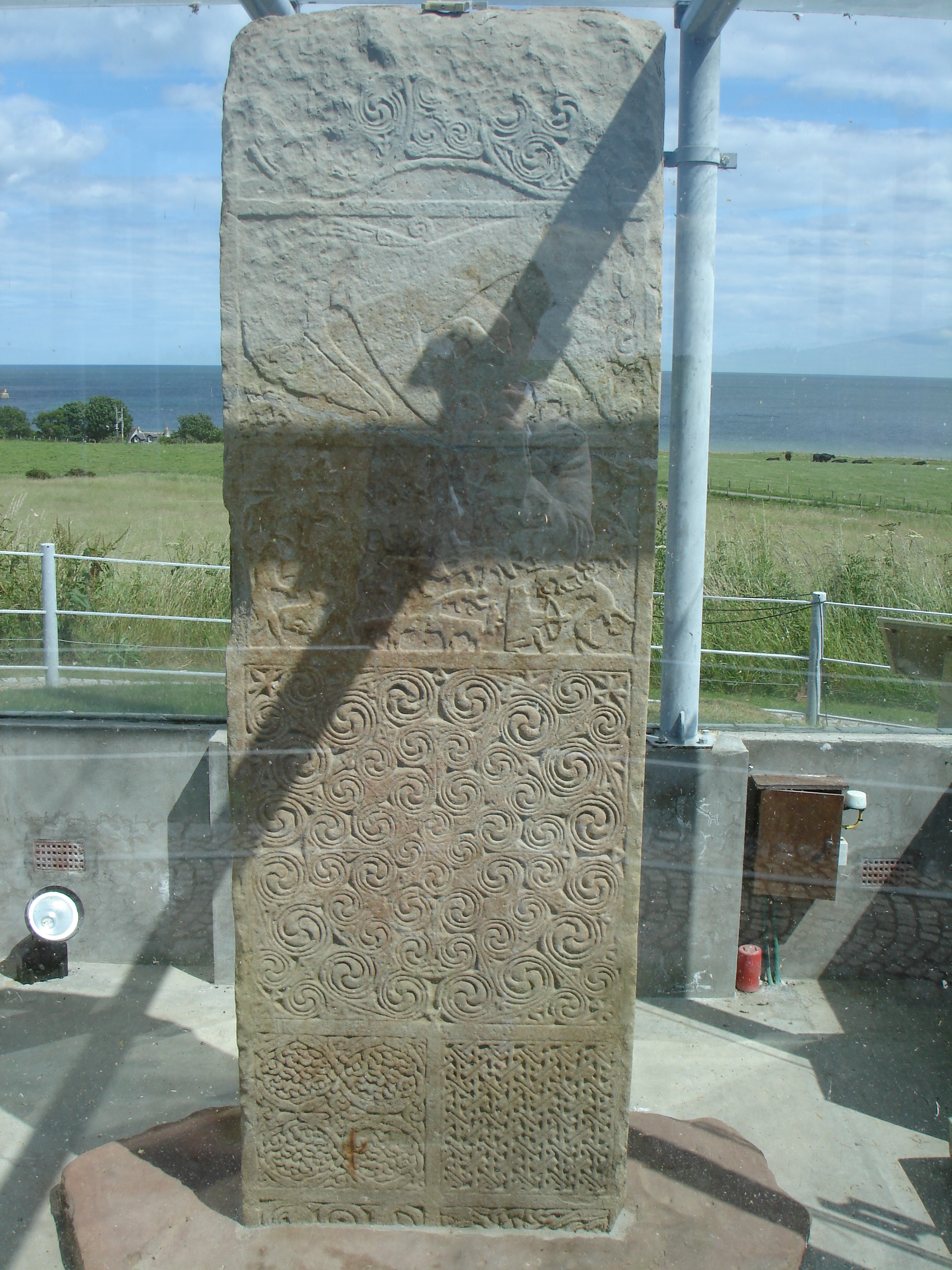
Clach a' Charridh, Landward side

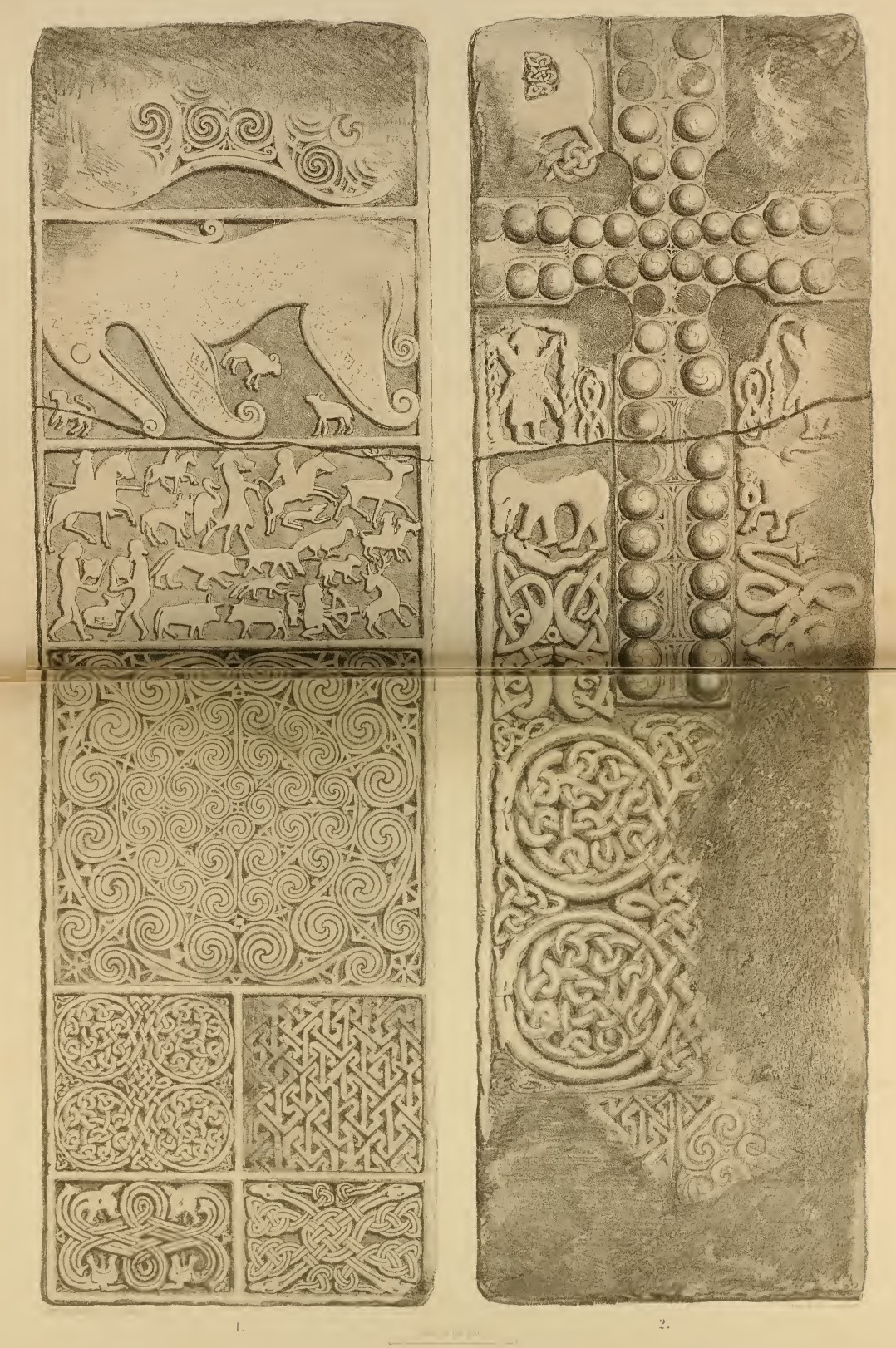
Reverse and Front of Shandwick Stone from Stuart: Sculptured Stones of Scotland Vol 1, 1856

The Clach a' Charridh or Shandwick Stone is a Class II Pictish stone located near Shandwick on the Tarbat peninsula in Easter Ross, Scotland. It is a scheduled monument. Since 1988 it has been encased in a glass cover room.

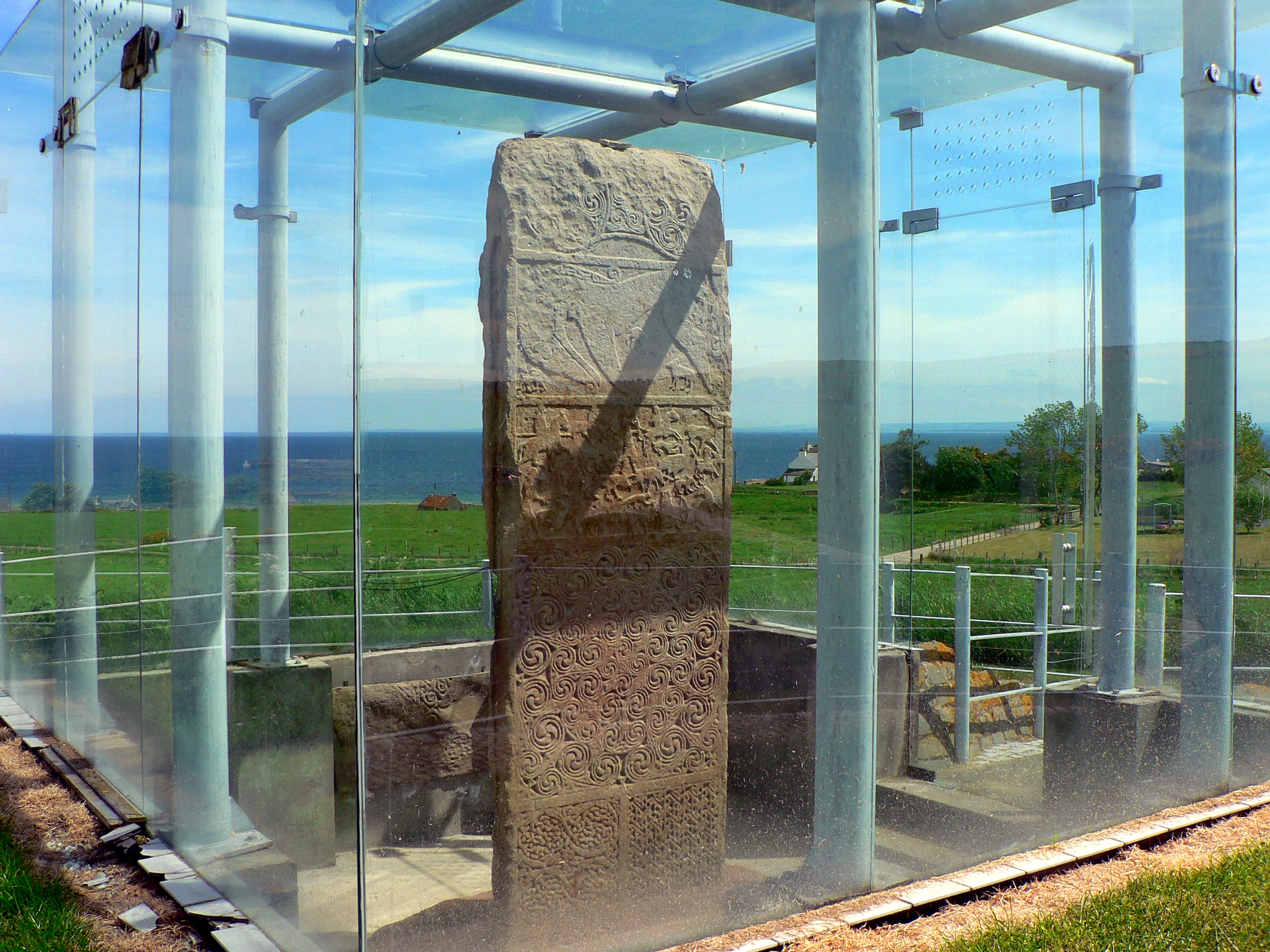

== Carving ==
It is a Class II stone, with a jewelled cross studded with 54 raised spiral bosses on the top half of one side and various Pictish symbols on the reverse.

On the face beneath the arms of the cross there are four-winged cherubim in frames either side of the cross-shaft. Beneath these are indeterminate beasts above interlaced serpent-like creatures. At the bottom, beneath the cross are two double-discs each composed of two pairs of serpents whose upper bodies form the rim of a disc with their lower bodies interlaced together in the centre of the other disc of the pair.

The reverse contains four full-width panels above a 2 x 2 arrangement of panels at the bottom (but the bottom 2 half-width panels are now hidden). The top panel shows a Pictish double-disc with (mostly) triple-spiral decoration. The second panel shows a large Pictish Beast with three small animals: two horned sheep and another quadruped with a long tail. The third panel is usually referred to as a hunting scene. It shows a large assortment of men and animals with three of the men mounted on horses hunting a stag; two men on foot fighting each other with swords while holding shields; and a man with a peaked cap firing a bow at a stag. The fourth panel contains 48 triple-spirals in concentric circles around 4 double-spirals at the centre. The outer spirals are very similar to those on the bottom panel on the reverse of the Hilton of Cadboll stone, which has been identified as representing the four rivers of paradise. The bottom 2 x 2 panels contain circular knotwork and interlace.

== History and orientation ==
The earliest published record of the stone is in Rev Charles Cordiner's Antiquities and Scenery of the North of Scotland, in a series of Letters to Thomas Pennant, London, 1780 where the reverse side is illustrated. The next published record is a paper by Charles Petley (1780–1830) written c. 1811–12, delivered posthumously to the Society of Antiquaries of Scotland in 1831 and published in 1857. This illustrates both faces of the stone, with the cross-face referred to as "west" and the reverse as "east" (see the accompanying plate showing the reverse).

In the Historic Scotland guidebook The Picts, Jill Harden writes:

As public monuments, largely thought to have been erected in the open air, cross-slabs were presumably used during Masses and perhaps as a focus for personal contemplation and prayer.

As in a church, the congregation would face east, towards the cross.

The stone fell in a storm in 1846 and was re-erected. Today the cross is on the east side, facing towards the sea and the Pictish symbols are on the west side, facing the land.

The Gaelic name (Clach a’ Charaidh) means ‘stone of the grave-plots’. A burial ground here was recorded in 1889 as last used during the cholera epidemic of 1832 and ploughed under about 1885.
