= Hilton of Cadboll Chapel =

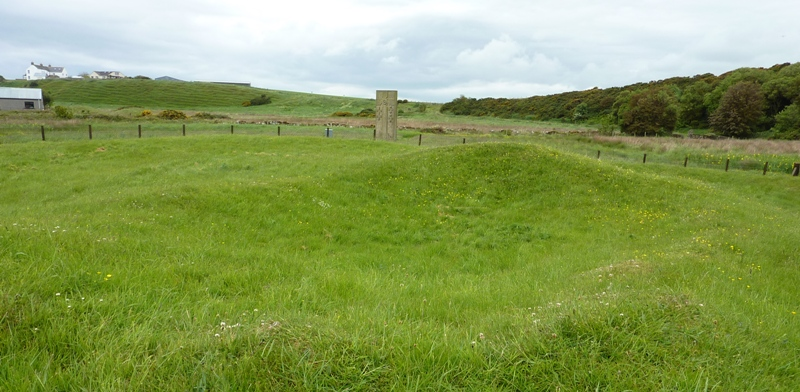
- The remains of Cadboll Chapel, which are visible as gently sloping turf-covered banks. The Hilton of Cadboll stone is visible in the background.

- Location within Scotland
- 57°46′2″N 3°53′45″W

The Hilton of Cadboll Chapel is the remains of a medieval chapel dedicated to the Virgin Mary. The chapel is located in Hilton of Cadboll, a village in the Highland council area.

The site overlooks the Moray Firth and is about 5 meters above sea level. The chapel would have been a prominent landmark, as it would have been visible from both water and land. The site is bordered on the north and west by rising ground, which would have provided a position where it was possible to look down over the site.

The chapel likely dates to some time in the 13th century and was used for worship and burial. There is also evidence of Pictish activity on the same site from sometime between 650 and 900 CE. An earlier chapel and burial ground may have been associated with this activity. Medieval pottery has been found on the site, which suggests that a settlement existed nearby during this period.

It is possible that the chapel fell out of use during the Reformation. Eighteenth-century records indicate the chapel was in ruins by that time, and by 1856 it was being used as a shed.

The chapel has been in the care of the state since 1978. Today all that remains of the chapel and the burial grounds are the foundation of the chapel and a series of low, turf-covered banks. The site also consists of the famous Hilton of Cadboll Stone, burial grounds near the chapel, and a well, known as "Oure Lady-Well."

== Construction ==
The remains indicate that this was likely a simple chapel, rectangular in shape. The chapel walls are constructed with large sandstone blocks bound together with shell mortar and with a rubble core. The remains of the chapel measure about 12 by 6.5 meters and are oriented east–west. There is no evidence of where the entrance was located.

The chapel is enclosed by multiple series of low, turf-covered banks, all about 3 meters wide. The different banks around the chapel indicate that they were built in multiple phases. The inner enclosure is oriented east-northeast to west-southwest and measures about 32 by 23 meters. At one point the walls of the inner enclosure had been extended to the northeast and southeast. This enclosure is likely the earliest of the enclosures, and may have been used to delineate the burial ground, though there is no sign of any headstones. One of the walls, which is likely part of this inner enclosure bank, could be dated to the earliest phase of activity at this site. This phase of construction began at some point between the 7th and 9th centuries CE and continued until the mid 12th century.

This enclosure and the chapel within it are surrounded by a second enclosure that was added later, likely from between the 16th and 19th centuries. This outer enclosure measures approximately 45 by 34 meters. The outer enclosure consists of a drystone wall with an earthen bank.

== Burial Grounds ==
Limited excavation has occurred within the enclosure wall to the west of the chapel, but human bone fragments dating from 650 to 900 CE have been found, which suggests that the early use for the site was used as a burial grounds. There is also evidence that the burial grounds continued to be used into the medieval period. Excavation of a small area to the west of the chapel has revealed the burials of four children/youths. Two of these burials were likely contemporary with the construction of the chapel, and the other two were likely buried at some point in the medieval or early post-medieval periods. This suggests there was some type of spatial zoning used within the burial grounds, and this practice may have continued from the building of the chapel to the late medieval period. Additionally, the site served as a burial ground for unbaptized infants until the end of the 19th century.

== Hilton of Cadboll Stone ==
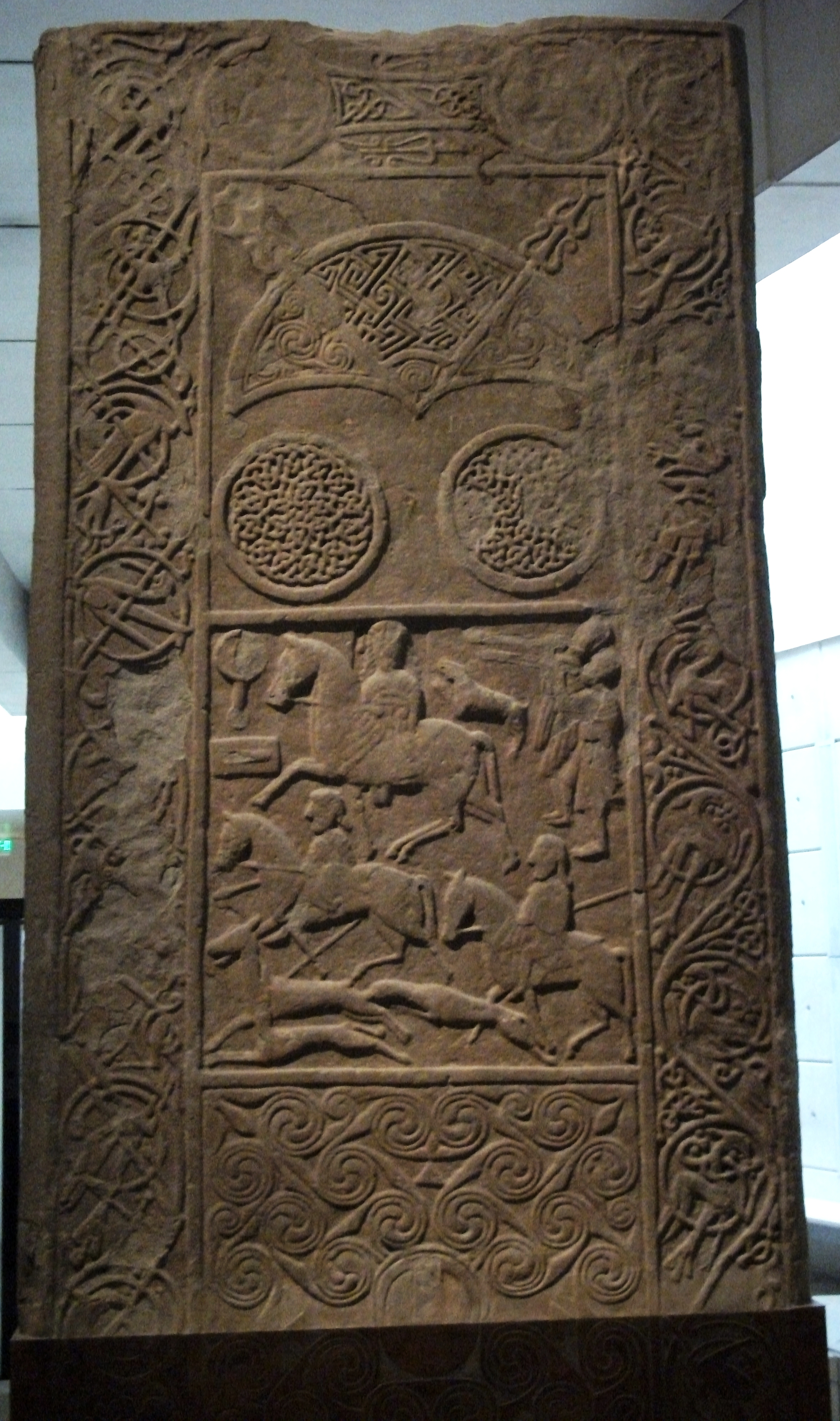
The Hilton of Cadboll stone on display in the National Museum of Scotland in Edinburgh

The Hilton of Cadboll Stone is a Pictish cross slab that was found near the Hilton of Cadboll Chapel. The stone was carved around 800 CE and stayed on site until it was removed in the 1860s. The Cadboll stone likely stood in a small, semicircular subject on the gable of the western side of the chapel until it was moved.

About 0.3 meters to the west of the stone's original site is the site of another setting where the stone likely stayed from 1150 to 1674. In 2001, the broken-off lower portion of the stone was found and subsequently removed for conservation. The presence of a cross slab of this quality suggests that the chapel may have been a place of worship of significant importance.

The original stone is currently on display at the National Museum of Scotland in Edinburgh and a replica now stands at the former site, which is visible from the remains of the chapel.

== Oure Lady-Well ==
A well known as "Oure Lady-Well" was associated with the chapel, though no trace remains today. To the north of the chapel are the remains of a broken font.
