= Balintore, Easter Ross =

Coordinates: 57.75701°N 3.91195°W

Balintore: Scottish Gaelic: Baile an Todhair
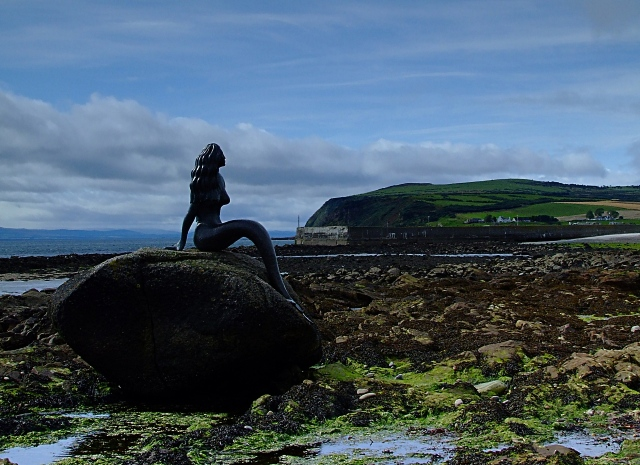
- The Mermaid of the North on the coast at Balintore

- Location within the Highland council area
- Population: 1,000 (2020)
- OS grid reference: NH863757
- Council area: Highland
- Country: Scotland
- Sovereign state: United Kingdom
- Post town: Tain
- Postcode district: IV20 1
- Police: Scotland
- Fire: Scottish
- Ambulance: Scottish

Balintore (from the Scottish Gaelic: Baile an Todhair meaning "The Bleaching Town") is a village near Tain in Easter Ross, Scotland. It is one of three villages on this northern stretch of the Moray Firth coastline: Hilton, Balintore, and Shandwick are known collectively as the Seaboard Villages.

An earlier name for Balintore was Port an Ab ("Abbot's Port"), after Fearn Abbey, the local landowner. Employment was formerly based on fishing. A road was built from Hill of Fearn in 1819, after which fish were shipped from the village, and Balintore Harbour was built in 1890–1896. The three villages were connected by a road in the first decade of the 20th century; Balintore has a post office and several shops. The Seaboard Village Hall, now the Seaboard Centre, is in Balintore and serves as a community centre for the three villages. The original building was erected in 1958 as a memorial to local people killed in the two World Wars, and was replaced in 2002.

John Ross, a missionary who translated the Bible into Korean, is commemorated by a 2007 monument, part of the Seaboard Sculpture Trail, and by the John Ross Visitor Centre, which opened in 2022 in a former church between Balintore and Hilton.

The Mermaid of the North sculpture, by Steve Hayward of Hilton, was placed in 2007 on Clach Dubh ('Black Rock') on the shore at Balintore. After the original wood and resin sculpture was damaged in a 2012 storm, it was replaced in cast bronze in 2014. It also forms part of the Seaboard Sculpture Trail.

== Gallery ==
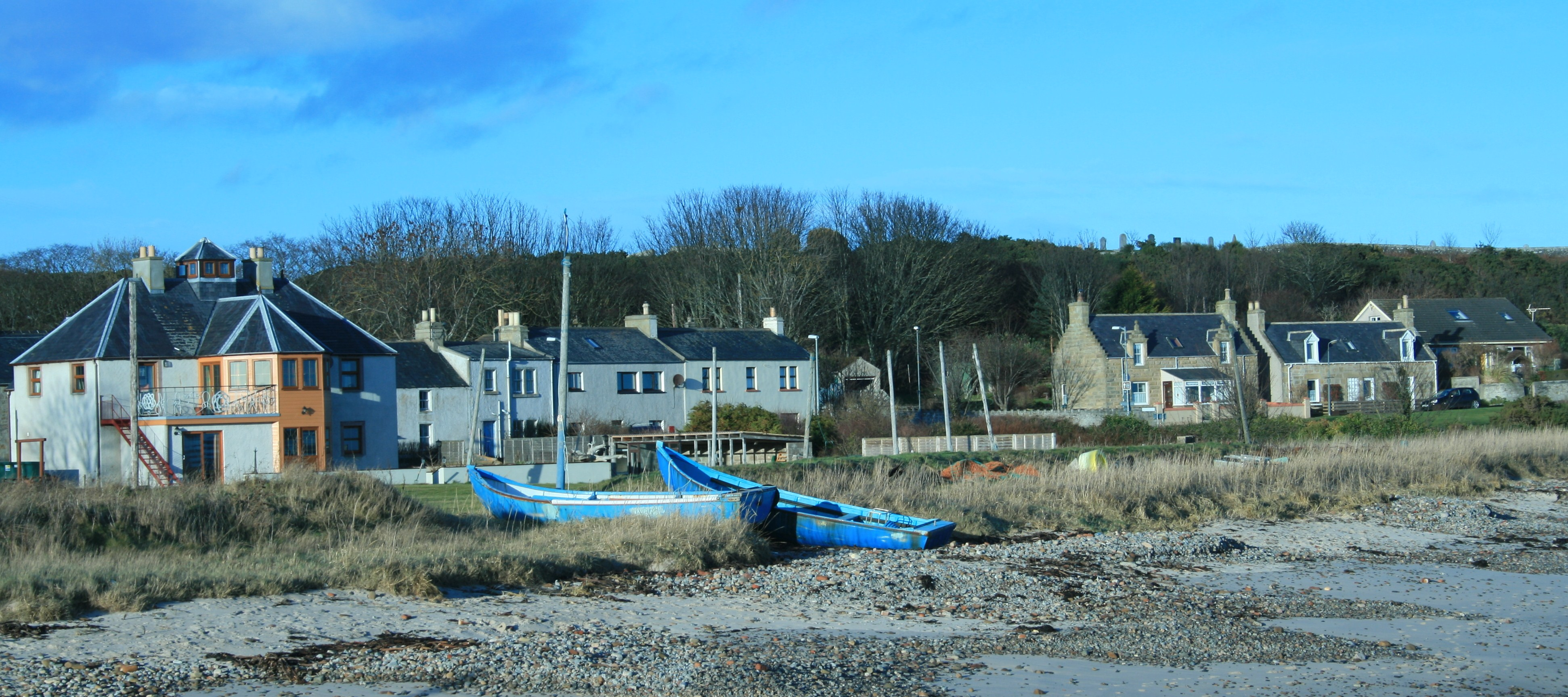
Central Balintore

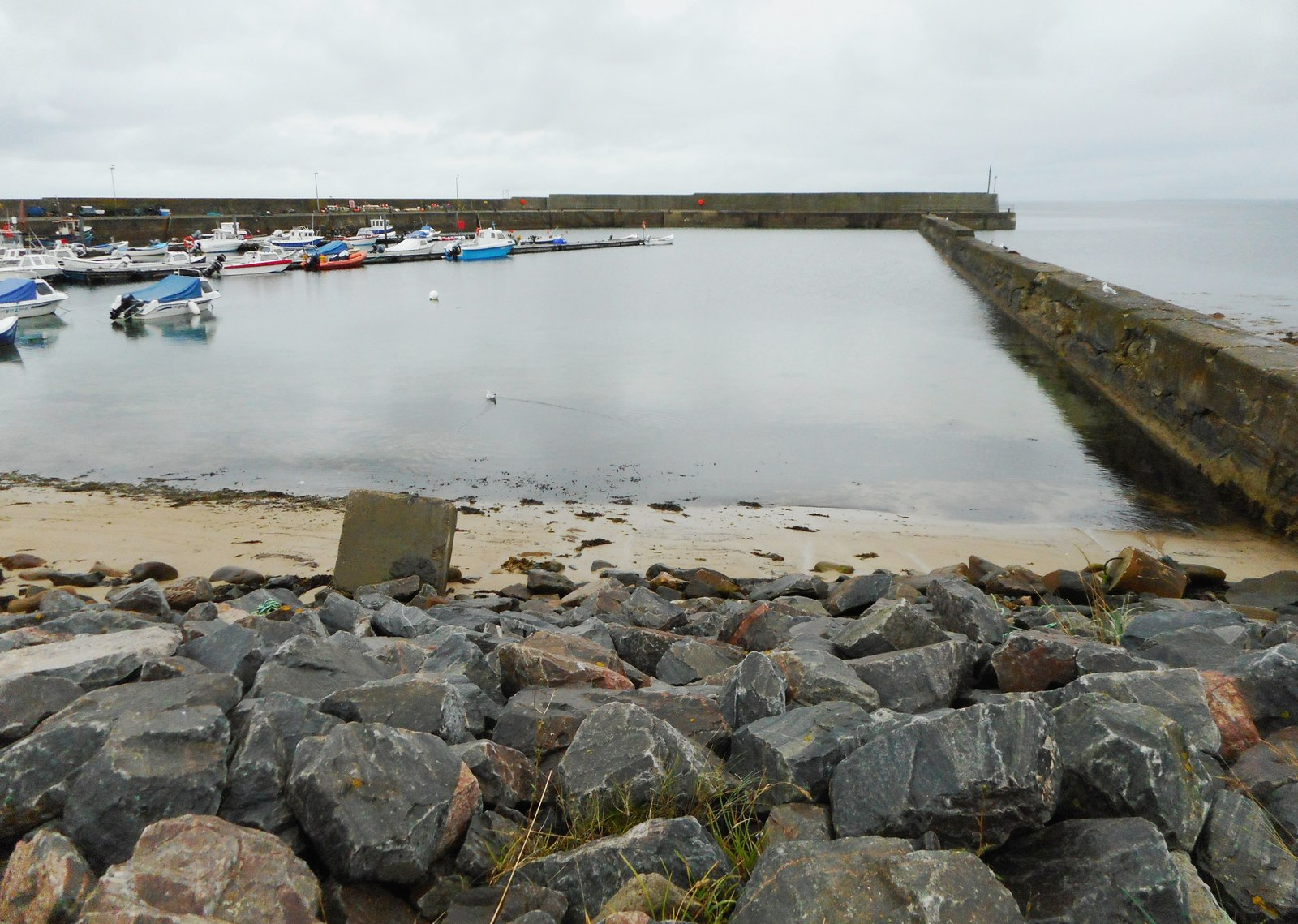
Harbour

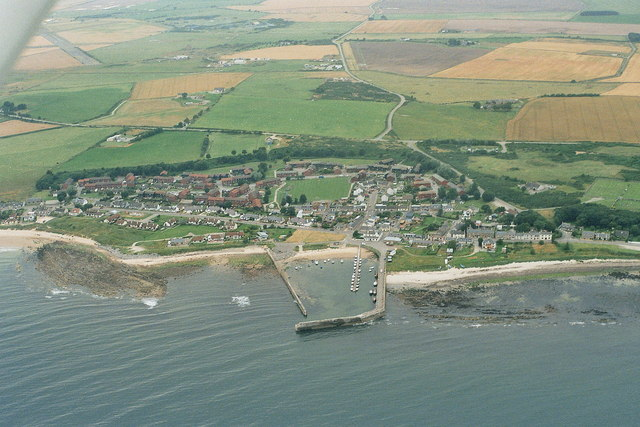
Aerial view

== See also ==
- Balintore F.C.
