= Shandwick =

Coordinates: 57.7503°N 3.92066°W

Shandwick: Scottish Gaelic: Seannduaig
- Location within the Highland council area
- OS grid reference: NH857750
- Council area: Highland
- Country: Scotland
- Sovereign state: United Kingdom
- Post town: Tain
- Postcode district: IV20 1
- Police: Scotland
- Fire: Scottish
- Ambulance: Scottish

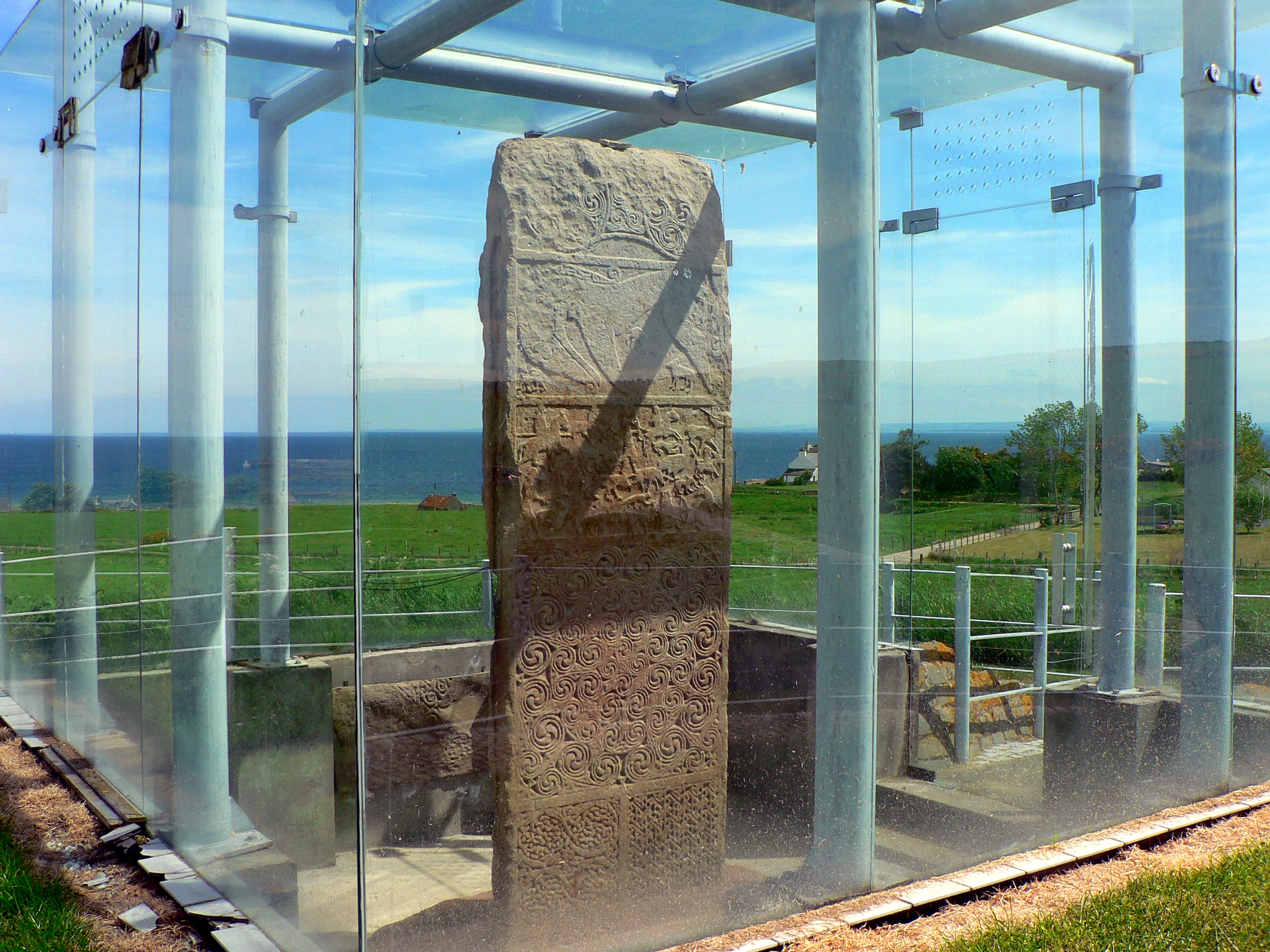
Shandwick Stone

Shandwick (Scottish Gaelic: Seannduaig), a village near Tain in Easter Ross, and is in the Scottish council area of Highland, Scotland.

Hilton, Balintore, and Shandwick are known collectively as the Seaboard Villages. It is well known because of the nearby Clach a' Charridh or Shandwick Stone, a Class II Pictish stone.
