= Easter Ross =

Geographic area of Scotland

Coordinates: 57.668°N 4.395°W

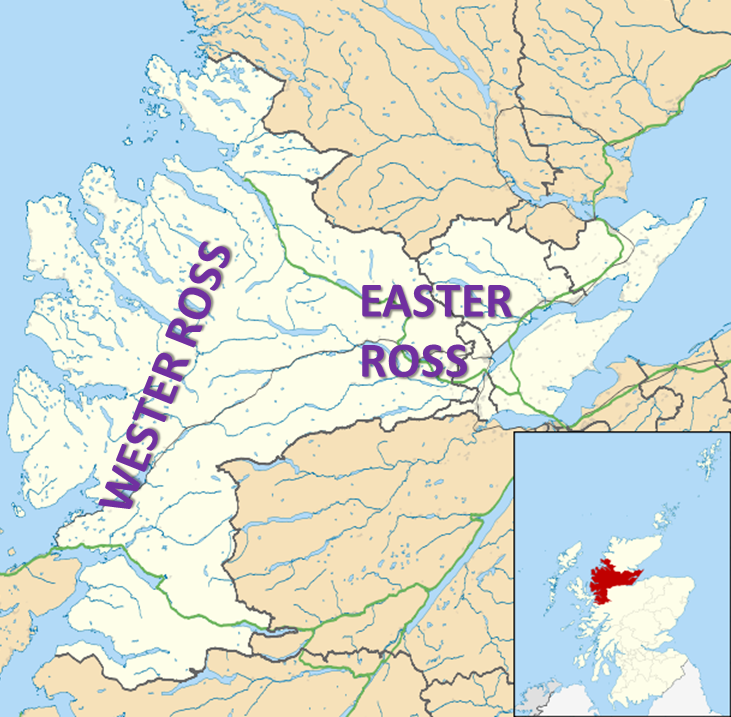
Location of Wester Ross and Easter Ross within Scotland.

Easter Ross (Scottish Gaelic: Ros an Ear) is a loosely defined area in the east of Ross, Highland, Scotland.

The name is used in the constituency name "Caithness, Sutherland and Easter Ross", which is the name of both a British House of Commons constituency and a former Scottish Parliament constituency. The two constituencies have different boundaries.

== Settlements ==
Places in Easter Ross include:

- Alness
- Dingwall (included in some contexts in the term Easter Ross, though in some contexts it refers to the area as Mid Ross)
- Evanton
- Invergordon
- Kildary
- Milntown of Tarbat (Milton)
- Portmahomack
- The Seaboard villages:
  - Balintore
  - Hilton of Cadboll
  - Shandwick
- Tain

Easter Ross is well known for its towns: Tain, Invergordon, Alness and Dingwall.

== See also ==
- Black Isle
- Ross and Cromarty
- Ross-shire
- Wester Ross
