= Hilton of Cadboll =

Coordinates: 57.765°N 3.896°W

Hilton of Cadboll: Scottish Gaelic: Baile a' Chnuic; Scots: Hilton
- Location within the Ross and Cromarty area
- OS grid reference: NH872765
- Council area: Highland
- Country: Scotland
- Sovereign state: United Kingdom
- Post town: Balintore
- Postcode district: IV20 1
- Police: Scotland
- Fire: Scottish
- Ambulance: Scottish

Hilton of Cadboll, or simply Hilton, (Scottish Gaelic: Baile a' Chnuic) is a village about 15 km (9 mi) southeast of Tain in Easter Ross, in the Scottish council area of Highland. It is famous for the Hilton of Cadboll Stone.

Hilton of Cadboll, Balintore, and Shandwick are known collectively as the Seaboard Villages.
