= Leitner =

Leitner is an Austrian and southern German surname. Notable people with the surname include:

- Alan Leitner (born 1947), American artist
- Alexandru Leitner, Romanian footballer
- Aloysius Leitner, American soldier
- Andreas Leitner (born 1994), Austrian footballer
- Annelie Leitner (born 1996), Austrian footballer
- Anton G. Leitner (born 1961), German writer and publisher
- Ben-Zion Leitner (c. 1927–2012), Israeli soldier
- Birgit Leitner (born 1981), Austrian football player
- Clemens Leitner (born 1998), Austrian ski jumper
- Daniela Leitner, Austrian-American physicist
- David Leitner, American chemist
- Doc Leitner (1865–1937), American baseball player
- Dummy Leitner (1872–1960), American baseball player
- Edward Frederick Leitner (1812–1838), German physician and botanist
- Erika Leitner, Italian luger
- Ernst Leitner (1912–1951), Austrian hurdler
- Ernst Ludwig Leitner (born 1943), Austrian composer, organist and academic teacher
- Felix Leitner (born 1996), Austrian biathlete
- Ferdinand Leitner (1912–1996), German conductor
- Franz Leitner (disambiguation), various people
- Friedrich Leitner (1874–1945), German economist
- Gottlieb Wilhelm Leitner (1840–1899), Anglo-Hungarian orientalist
- Helga Leitner, Austrian geographer
- Hermann Leitner (1927–2013), Austrian film editor and film director
- Hias Leitner (born 1935), Austrian alpine skier
- Jan Leitner (born 1953), Czech athlete
- Joseph F. Leitner (1871–1930), American architect
- Jürgen Leitner (born 1975), Austrian former footballer
- Jurgen Leitner, fictional character in The Magnus Archives
- Karin Leitner, Austrian flautist and composer
- Karl Leitner (born 1937), Austrian sprint canoer
- Karl Gottfried von Leitner (1800–1890), Austrian writer
- Karsten Leitner (born 1995), Canadian rugby union player
- Kurt Leitner (1946–2018), Austrian football player and manager
- Lisa Leitner (born 1995), Austrian slalom canoeist
- Ludwig Leitner (1940–2013), West German alpine skier
- Maria Leitner (1892–1942), Hungarian writer and journalist
- Maria Leitner (ice hockey) (born 1981), Italian ice hockey player
- Mario Leitner (born 1997), Austrian slalom canoeist
- Matt Leitner (born 1990), American ice hockey player
- Max Leitner (1958–2024), Italian criminal
- Miroslav Leitner (born 1966), Slovak ski mountaineer
- Moritz Leitner (born 1992), German footballer
- Patric Leitner (born 1977), German luger
- Patrik Leitner (born 2002), Slovak footballer
- Paul Albert Leitner, Austrian photographer
- Peter Leitner (born 1956), West German ski jumper
- Reinhold Leitner (born 1966), Austrian butterfly swimmer
- Sándor Leitner (1889–1972), Hungarian Jewish trader
- Sebastian Leitner (1919–1989), Austrian-German science popularizer, journalist and author, inventor of the Leitner system using flashcards
- Tammy Leitner (born 1972), American journalist and reality television contestant
- Ted Leitner, American sportscaster
- Thea Leitner (1921–2016), Austrian writer
- Vladimir Leitner (born 1974), Slovak footballer
- Walter Leitner (born 1963), German chemist
- William Zachariah Leitner (1829–1888), American lawyer, politician, and Confederate officer
- Wolfgang Leitner (born 1953), Austrian businessman

== See also ==
- Leitner Creek, a small tributary of the Upper Mississippi River
- Leitner Ropeways, an Italian ropeway manufacturer
