= Leites =

Leites is a surname. Notable people with the surname include:

- Nathan Leites (1912–1987), American sociologist and politologist of Russian origins.
- Thales Leites (born 1981), Brazilian mixed martial artist competing in the Middleweight division of the Ultimate Fighting Championship.

== See also ==
- Leite
- Leiter
- Leitner
- Leites Nestlé, Brazilian women's volleyball club.
