= Filomena Nunes =

Portuguese atomic physicist

Filomena M. Nunes is a nuclear physicist whose research focuses on the theory of low-energy nuclear reactions. Nunes was educated in Portugal and England, and works in the United States as a professor of physics at Michigan State University.

== Education and career ==
Nunes studied physics engineering at the Instituto Superior Técnico from 1987 to 1992. She continued her studies at the University of Surrey in England, where she completed a Ph.D. in 1995.

After postdoctoral research at the Instituto Superior Técnico, she taught at Fernando Pessoa University in Portugal from 1998 to 2003. In 1999, she added a second affiliation as assistant professor of physics at the Instituto Superior Técnico. She moved to Michigan State University in 2003 as an assistant professor in the Department of Physics and Astronomy and the National Superconducting Cyclotron Laboratory (NSCL). She was promoted to associate professor in 2009, and full professor in 2013. From 2010 to 2016 headed the NCSL Department of Theoretical Nuclear Science.

== Recognition ==
Nunes was elected as a Fellow of the American Physical Society (APS) in 2015, after a nomination from the APS Division of Nuclear Physics, "for developing new standards in relating nuclear reactions, nuclear structure, and astrophysical reaction rates by the implementation of non-perturbative treatments of nuclear breakup". In 2021 she received the Distinguished Service Award of the APS Division of Nuclear Physics, "for her exceptional and rich contributions toward making the DNP a place where all members can thrive, especially those from traditionally underrepresented groups, including service as the inaugural chair of the subcommittee on harassment prevention and the creation of the DNP Allies program".

She became a Fellow of the American Association for the Advancement of Science in 2021.

== Selected publications ==
Nunes is a coauthor of the book Nuclear Reactions for Astrophysics: Principles, Calculation and Applications of Low-Energy Reactions (with Ian J. Thompson, Cambridge University Press, 2009). Articles she has published include:

- Nunes, F. M.; Thompson, I. J.; Johnson, R. C. (January 1996), "Core excitation in one neutron halo systems", Nuclear Physics A, 596 (2): 171–186, Bibcode:1996NuPhA.596..171N, doi:10.1016/0375-9474(95)00398-3
- Nunes, F. M.; Christley, J. A.; Thompson, I. J.; Johnson, R. C.; Efros, V. D. (November 1996), "Core excitation in three-body systems: Application to 12Be", Nuclear Physics A, 609 (1): 43–73, doi:10.1016/0375-9474(96)00284-9
- Nunes, F. M.; Thompson, I. J. (May 1999), "Multistep effects in sub-Coulomb breakup", Physical Review C, 59 (5): 2652–2659, arXiv:nucl-th/9902021, Bibcode:1999PhRvC..59.2652N, doi:10.1103/physrevc.59.2652
- Adelberger, E. G.; García, A.; Robertson, R. G. Hamish; Snover, K. A.; Balantekin, A. B.; Heeger, K.; Ramsey-Musolf, M. J.; Bemmerer, D.; Junghans, A.; Bertulani, C. A.; Chen, J.-W.; Costantini, H.; Prati, P.; Couder, M.; Uberseder, E.; Wiescher, M.; Cyburt, R.; Davids, B.; Freedman, S. J.; Gai, M.; Gazit, D.; Gialanella, L.; Imbriani, G.; Greife, U.; Hass, M.; Haxton, W. C.; Itahashi, T.; Kubodera, K.; Langanke, K.; Leitner, D.; Leitner, M.; Vetter, P.; Winslow, L.; Marcucci, L. E.; Motobayashi, T.; Mukhamedzhanov, A.; Tribble, R. E.; Nollett, Kenneth M.; Nunes, F. M.; Park, T.-S.; Parker, P. D.; Schiavilla, R.; Simpson, E. C.; Spitaleri, C.; Strieder, F.; Trautvetter, H.-P.; Suemmerer, K.; Typel, S. (April 2011), "Solar fusion cross sections II: The pp chain and CNO cycles", Reviews of Modern Physics, 83 (1): 195–245, arXiv:1004.2318, Bibcode:2011RvMP...83..195A, doi:10.1103/revmodphys.83.195
- Nunes, F. M.; Deltuva, A. (September 2011), "Adiabatic approximation versus exact Faddeev method for (d,p) and (p,d) reactions", Physical Review C, 84 (3) 034607, American Physical Society (APS), arXiv:1108.2519, doi:10.1103/physrevc.84.034607
