= Walter Leitner =

German chemist

Walter Leitner (born 1 February 1963 in Pfarrkirchen, Germany) is a German chemist, the director of the Max Planck Institute for Chemical Energy Conversion (MPI CEC) heading the department "Molecular Catalysis" as well as a university lecturer at the RWTH Aachen University, where he holds the position of chair for technical chemistry and petrochemistry.

== Career ==
Leitner studied at the University of Regensburg from 1982 to 1987 and received his doctorate in 1989 from the Institute of Inorganic Chemistry with a thesis on enantioselective catalytic transfer hydrogenation of formates. In 1990, he completed a postdoctoral stint in the working group of John Michael Brown at the Dyson Perrins Laboratory for Organic Chemistry at the University of Oxford. In 1991 and 1992 Leitner worked as a Liebig Fellow of the Fund of the Chemical Industry at the Inorganic-Chemical Institute of the University of Regensburg. After three years of work (1992–1995) at the CO_{2} Chemistry Working Group of the Max Planck Society (head: E. Dinjus) at the Friedrich Schiller University of Jena, he habilitated in the field of Inorganic Chemistry and was appointed private lecturer. He moved to the Max Planck Institute for Coal Research in Mülheim as head of the working group in the field of organic synthesis, where he took over the technical management at the beginning of 1998. From 2002 he has been the Chair of Technical Chemistry and Petroleum Chemistry, as the successor to Wilhelm Keim at the RWTH Aachen University.

From September 2007, Leitner established the catalysis center "CAT" together with Bayer Material Science AG (now called Covestro AG) and Bayer Technology Services at RWTH Aachen University, of which he has been scientific director ever since.

From 2004 to 2016, he was the scientific editor and then the chair of the editorial board of the journal Green Chemistry, published by the Royal Society of Chemistry.

During his engagement with DECHEMA, Leitner was on the board of the newly founded specialist section "Advanced Fluids" in 2007 and on the first board of the German Society for Catalysis (GeCatS) in 2008.

On 1 October 2017, Leitner was appointed Director of the Max Planck Institute for Chemical Energy Conversion (MPI CEC) where he was appointed scientific director of the "Molecular Catalysis" Department. Leitner will continue his chair at RWTH for an initial period of five years as part-time professorship.

== Research areas ==
Leitner's scientific work focuses on the development of catalysts and catalyst technologies for sustainable chemical processes (Green Chemistry). The focus is on the development and understanding of the mode of action of molecular catalysts, including detailed experimental and computer chemical studies of the mechanisms and structural-effect relationships in organometallic catalysis. Particular attention is paid to new material conversions and the use of new raw materials for catalytic synthesis as well as to the use of modern reaction media (supercritical fluids, ionic liquids, polyethylene glycol (PEG) and others) for catalytic processes. Multiphase catalysis and catalyst immobilization as well as the development of reactional concepts for continuous processes in molecular catalysis are also important research interests. The use of carbon dioxide, both as a raw material at the interface between chemistry and energy, as well as a green solvent and transport medium for continuous chemical processes, accompanied his scientific career.

== Selected awards ==
Leitner received the Gerhard Hess Prize of the German Research Foundation in 1977, the Carl Zerbe Prize of the DGMK in 1998, the Otto Roelen Medal of DECHEMA in 2001, the Wöhler Prize for Sustainable Chemistry of the German Chemical Society (GDCh) in 2009, and together with Jürgen Klankermayer the European Sustainable Chemistry Award of the European Chemical Society in 2014. He has been a Member of the Max Planck Institute for Coal Research, Mülheim/Ruhr since 2002 and a Fellow of the Royal Society of Chemistry since 2010.

On 1 January 2018, Walter Leitner was appointed to the Editorial Board of the Journal Angewandte Chemie.

In September 2019, Walter Leitner and researchers from Covestro AG (Christoph Gürtler and Berit Stange) were nominated for the German Future Prize with the project "CO_{2} – a raw material for sustainable plastics".

In 2020 Walter Leitner was awarded the Georg Wittig-Victor Grignard Prize.

== Key publications ==
- Walter Leitner: Enantioselektive katalytische Transferhydrierung mit Formiaten. Dissertation, Regensburg, 1989.
- Walter Leitner: Rhodiumkatalysierte Hydrierung von Kohlendioxid zu Ameisensäure habilitation, Jena, 1995.
- Jessop, Philip G.; Leitner, Walter, eds. (8 July 1999). Chemical Synthesis Using Supercritical Fluids. Wiley. doi:10.1002/9783527613687. ISBN 978-3-527-29605-7.
- Anastas, Paul (2009). Handbook of green chemistry. Weinheim: Wiley-VCH. ISBN 978-3-527-32590-0. OCLC 316146211.
- Zimmerman, Julie B.; Anastas, Paul T.; Erythropel, Hanno C.; Leitner, Walter (24 January 2020). "Designing for a green chemistry future". Science. 367 (6476). American Association for the Advancement of Science (AAAS): 397–400. Bibcode:2020Sci...367..397Z. doi:10.1126/science.aay3060. ISSN 0036-8075. PMID 31974246. S2CID 210880073.
