= Justus von Liebig =

German chemist (1803–1873)

Justus von Liebig ForMemRS
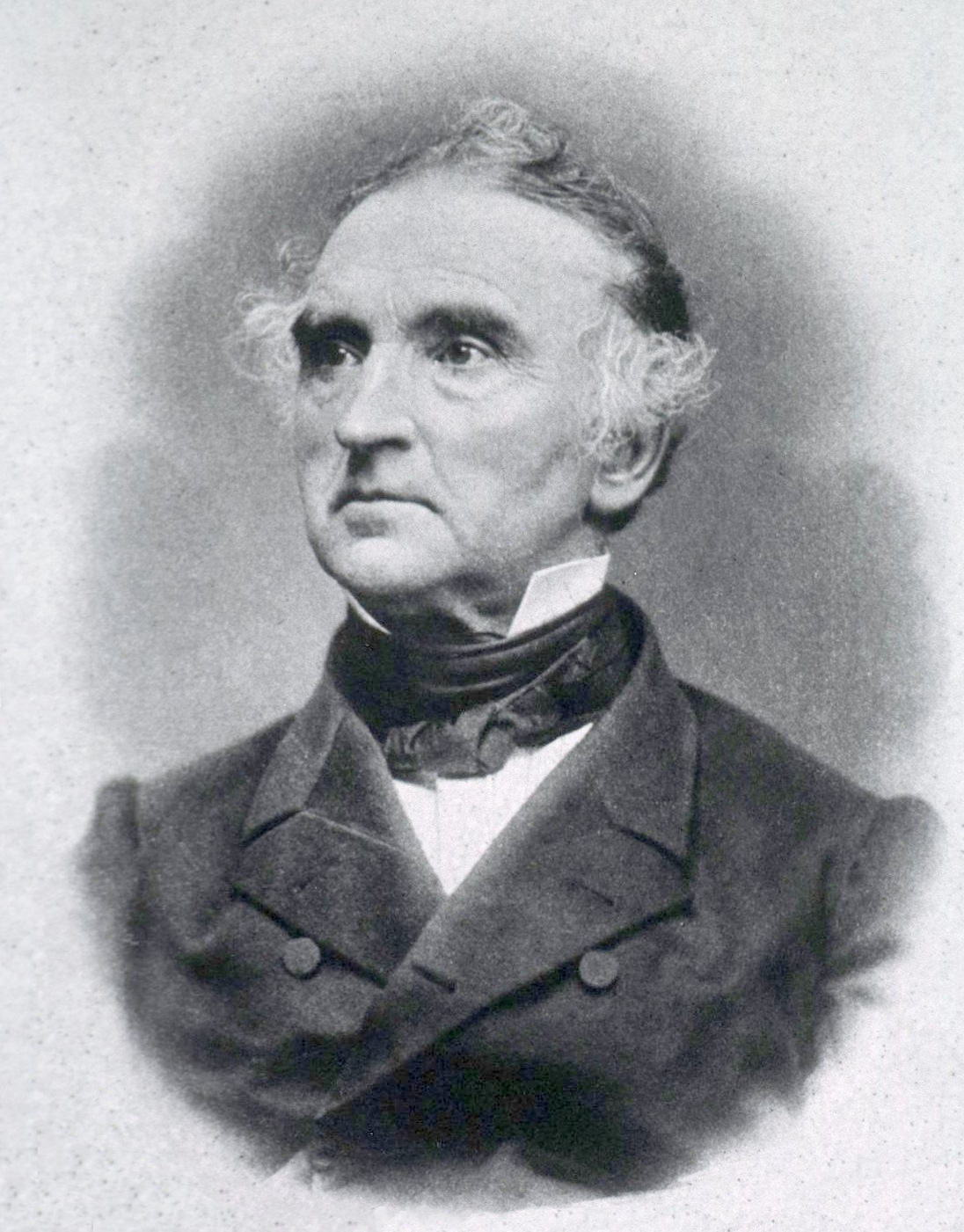
- Liebig c. 1866
- Born: 12 May 1803; Darmstadt, Hesse-Darmstadt
- Died: 18 April 1873 (aged 69); Munich, Germany
- Education: University of Bonn; University of Erlangen–Nuremberg
- Known for: See list: Agricultural chemistry; Analytical chemistry; Biochemistry; Organic chemistry; Benzilic acid rearrangement; Benzoin condensation; Barking dog reaction; Chloral; Combustion analysis; Fermentation theory; Infant formula; Isocyanic acid; Kynurenic acid; Liebig condenser; Liebig process; Liebig's law of the minimum; Liebig's theory of acids; Liebig–Pasteur dispute; Kaliapparat; Marmite; Meat extract; Melamine; Organocatalysis; Plant nutrition; Sarcosine; Silvering; Tyrosine; Yeast extract
- Awards: Albert Medal (1869); Pour le Mérite (1851); Légion d'honneur (1850); Copley Medal (1840)
- Scientific career
- Fields: Chemistry
- Workplaces: University of Giessen; Ludwig-Maximilians-Universität München
- Doctoral advisor: Karl Wilhelm Gottlob Kastner
- Doctoral students: See list: Carl Schmidt; Nikolay Zinin; Victor Regnault; Carl von Voit; Hermann von Fehling; Hermann Franz Moritz Kopp; August von Hofmann; Lyon Playfair; Emil Erlenmeyer; Heinrich Ritthausen; Moritz Traube; Adolph Strecker; Wilhelm Henneberg
- Other notable students: See list: August Kekulé; Sir Benjamin Collins Brodie, 2nd Baronet; Augustus Voelcker; Julius Eugen Schlossberger; Carl Vogt; Max Joseph von Pettenkofer

Justus Freiherr von Liebig (Note: German pronunciation: [ˈjʊstʊs fɔn ˈliːbɪç], southern German: [- ˈliːbɪɡ].) (12 May 1803 – 18 April 1873) was a German scientist who made major contributions to the theory, practice, and pedagogy of chemistry, as well as to agricultural and biological chemistry; he is considered one of the principal founders of organic chemistry. As a professor at the University of Giessen, he devised the modern laboratory-oriented teaching method, and for such innovations, he is regarded as one of the most outstanding chemistry teachers of all time. He has been described as the "father of the fertilizer industry" for his emphasis on nitrogen and minerals as essential plant nutrients, and his popularization of the law of the minimum, which states that plant growth is limited by the scarcest nutrient resource, rather than the total amount of resources available. He also developed a manufacturing process for beef extracts, and with his consent a company, called Liebig Extract of Meat Company, was founded to exploit the concept; it later introduced the Oxo brand beef bouillon cube. He popularized an earlier invention for condensing vapors, which came to be known as the Liebig condenser.

== Early life and education ==
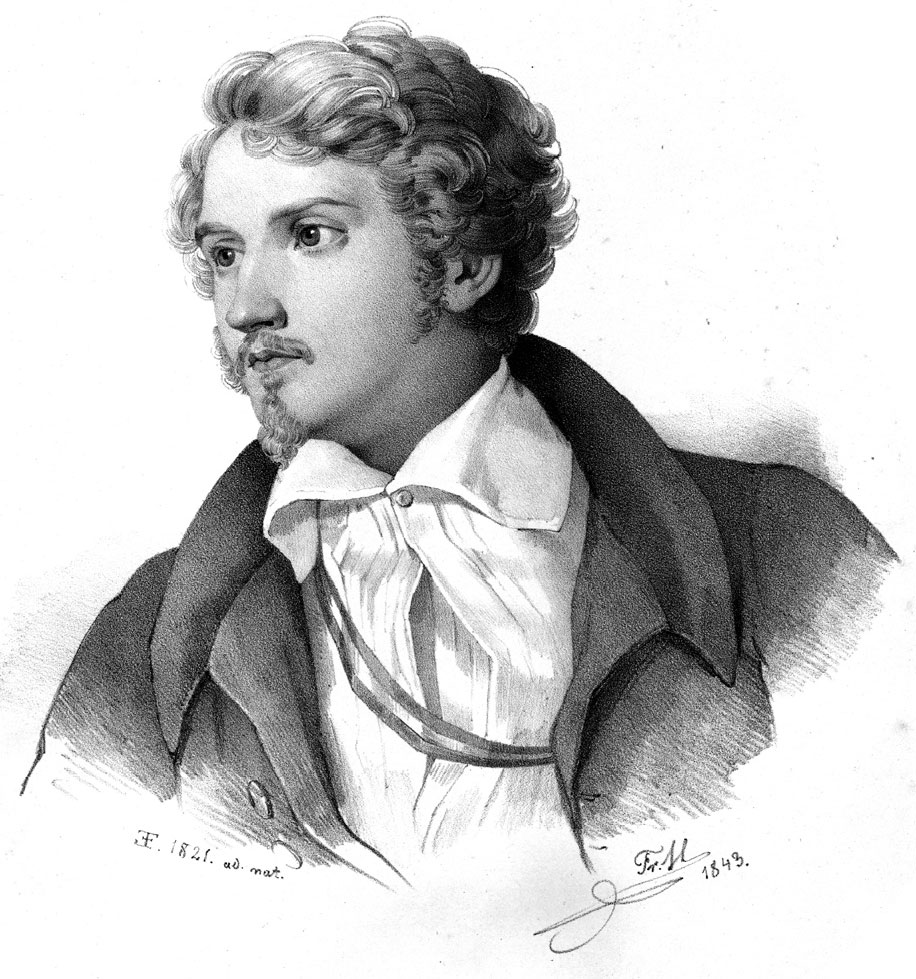
The young Liebig: 1843 lithograph after an 1821 painting (Liebighaus)

Justus Liebig was born in Darmstadt into the middle-class family of Johann Georg Liebig and Maria Caroline Möser in early May 1803. His father was a drysalter and hardware merchant who compounded and sold paints, varnishes, and pigments, which he developed in his own workshop. From childhood, Justus was fascinated with chemistry.

At the age of 13, Liebig lived through the year without a summer, when the majority of food crops in the Northern Hemisphere were destroyed by a volcanic winter. Germany was among the hardest-hit nations in the global famine that ensued, and the experience is said to have shaped Liebig's later work. Due in part to Liebig's innovations in fertilizers and agriculture, the 1816 famine became known as "the last great subsistence crisis in the Western world".

Liebig attended grammar school at the Ludwig-Georgs-Gymnasium in Darmstadt, from the ages of 8 to 14. Leaving without a certificate of completion, he was apprenticed for several months to the apothecary Gottfried Pirsch (1792–1870) in Heppenheim before returning home, possibly because his father could not afford to pay his indentures (a legal contract that reflects or covers a debt or purchase obligation). He worked with his father for the next two years, then attended the University of Bonn, studying under Karl Wilhelm Gottlob Kastner, his father's business associate. When Kastner moved to the University of Erlangen–Nuremberg, Liebig followed him.

Liebig left Erlangen in March 1822, in part because of his involvement with the radical Korps Rhenania (a nationalist student organization), but also because of his hopes for more advanced chemical studies. The circumstances are clouded by possible scandal. Some scholars argue that he fled to Paris because of his involvement in radical student groups. In late October 1822, Liebig went to Paris to study on a grant obtained for him by Kastner from the Hessian government. He worked in the private laboratory of Joseph Louis Gay-Lussac and was also befriended by Alexander von Humboldt and Georges Cuvier (1769–1832). Liebig's doctorate from Erlangen was conferred on 23 June 1823, a considerable time after he left, as a result of Kastner's intervention on his behalf. Kastner pleaded that the requirement of a dissertation be waived and the degree granted in absentia.

== Research and development ==
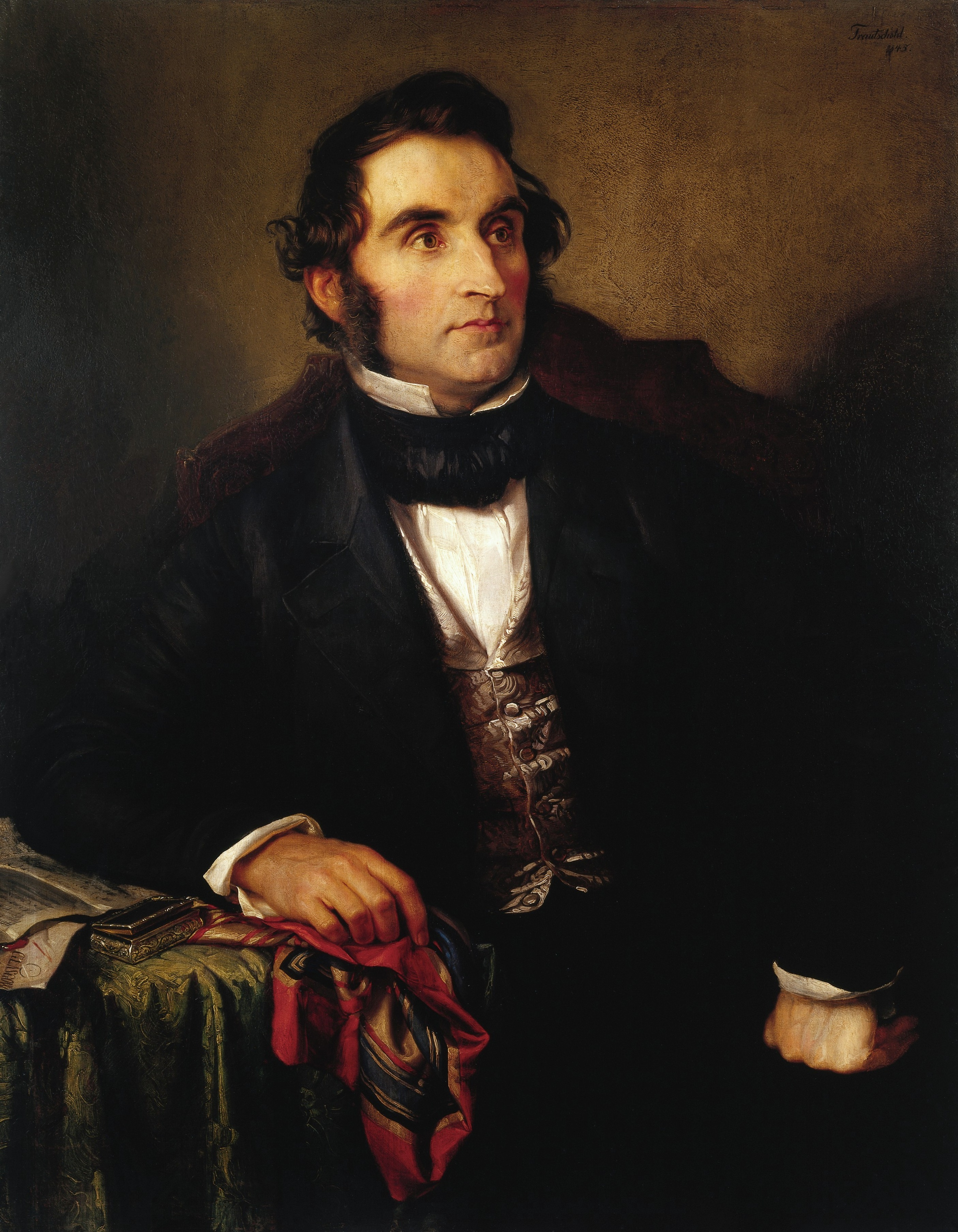
Justus von Liebig, by Wilhelm Trautschold, circa 1846

Liebig left Paris to return to Darmstadt in April 1824. On 26 May 1824, at the age of 21 and with Humboldt's recommendation, Liebig became a professor extraordinarius at the University of Giessen. Liebig's appointment was part of an attempt to modernize the University of Giessen and attract more students. He received a small stipend, without laboratory funding or access to facilities.

The presence of existing faculty complicated his situation: Professor Wilhelm Zimmermann (1780–1825) taught general chemistry as part of the philosophy faculty, leaving medical chemistry and pharmacy to Professor Philipp Vogt in the medical faculty. Vogt was happy to support a reorganization in which pharmacy was taught by Liebig and became the responsibility of the faculty of arts, rather than the faculty of medicine. Zimmermann found himself competing unsuccessfully with Liebig for students and their lecture fees. He refused to allow Liebig to use existing space and equipment and finally committed suicide on 19 July 1825. The deaths of Zimmermann and Professor Blumhof, who taught technology and mining, opened the way for Liebig to apply for a full professorship. Liebig was appointed to the Ordentlicher chair in chemistry on 7 December 1825, receiving a considerably increased salary and a laboratory allowance.

Liebig married Henriette "Jettchen" Moldenhauer (1807–1881), the daughter of a state official, in May 1826. They had five children: Georg (1827–1903), Agnes (1828–1862), Hermann (1831–1894), Johanna (1836–1925), and Marie (1845–1920). Although Liebig was Lutheran and Jettchen Catholic, their differences in religion appear to have been resolved amicably by bringing their sons up in the Lutheran faith and their daughters as Catholics.

=== Transforming chemistry education ===
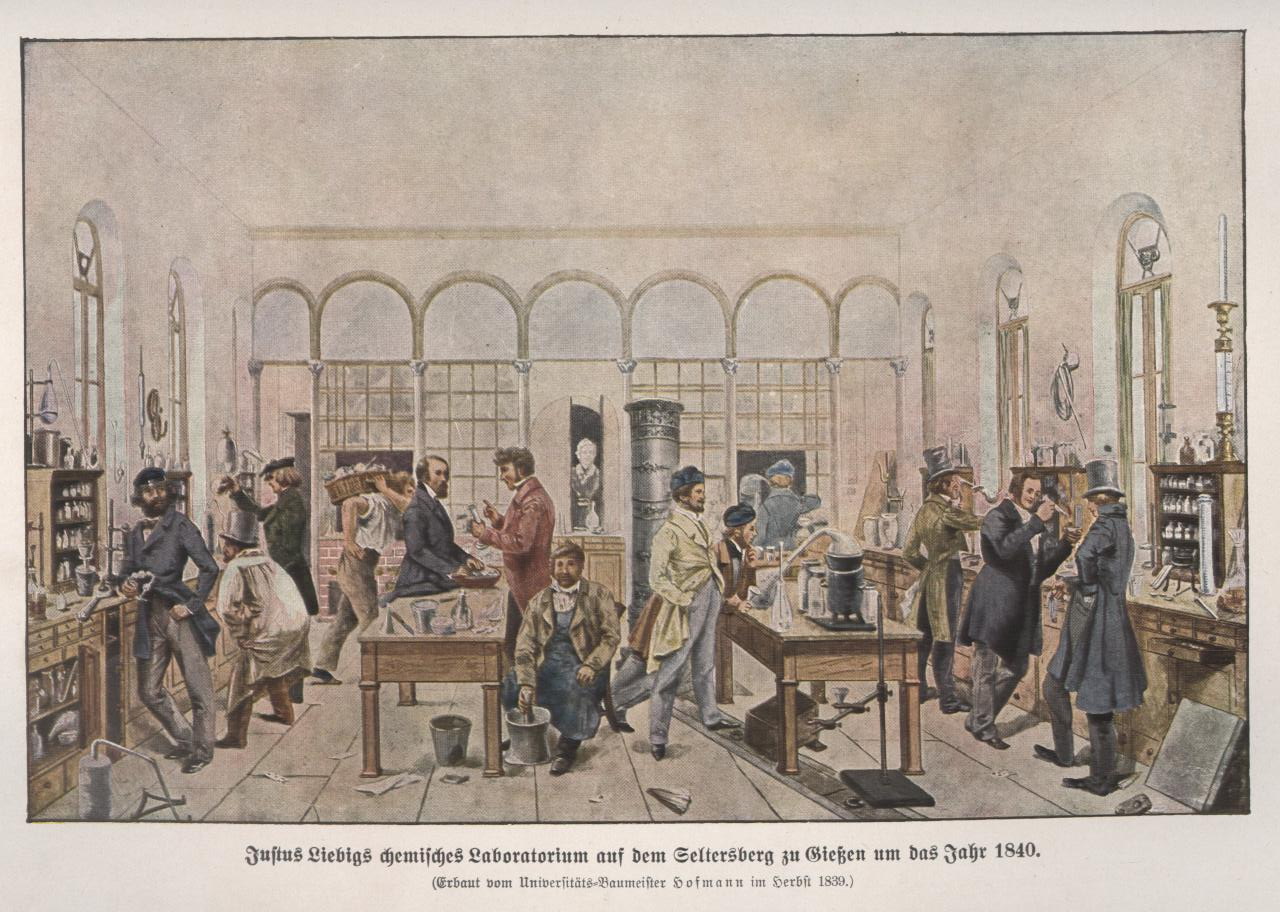
Liebig's laboratory at Giessen, by Wilhelm Trautschold

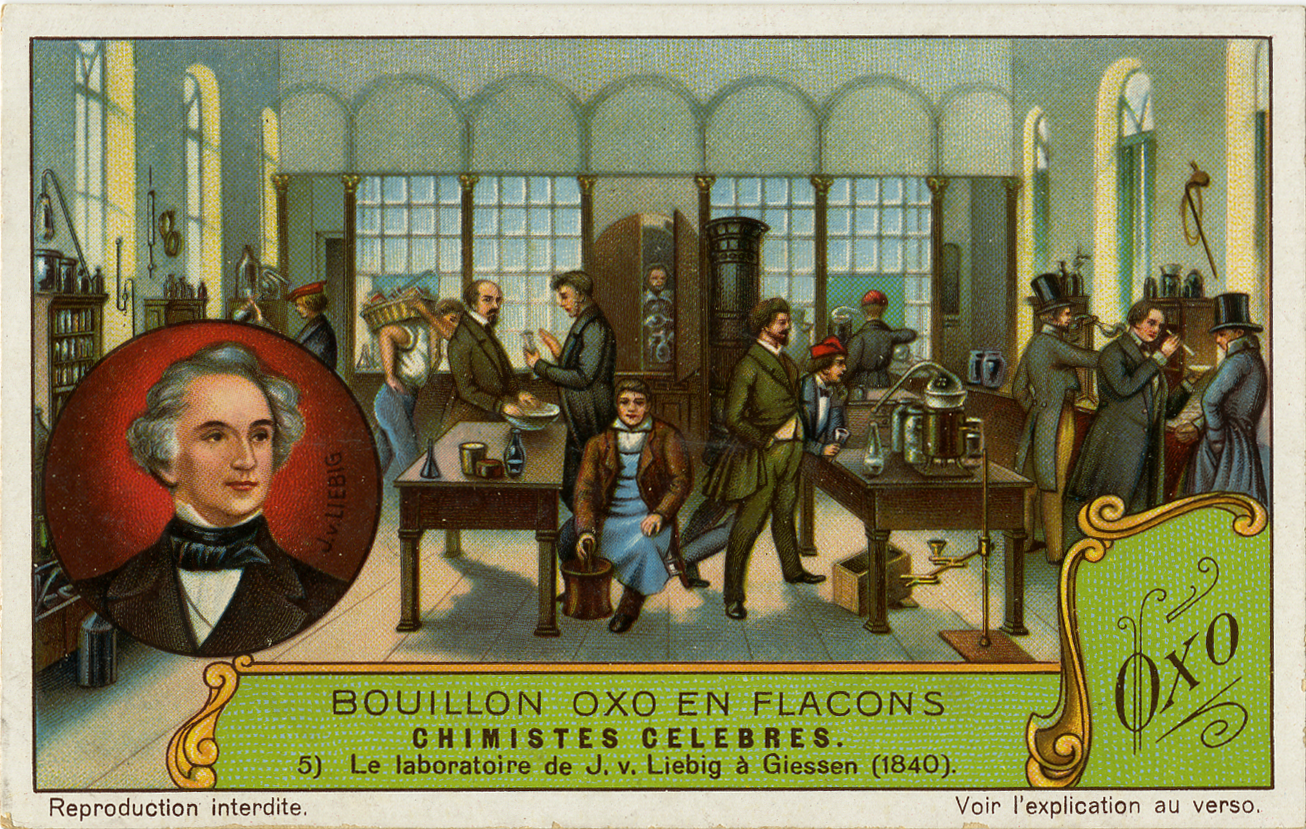
Liebig's laboratory, Chimistes Celebres, Liebig's Extract of Meat Company Trading Card, 1929

Liebig and several associates proposed to create an institute for pharmacy and manufacturing within the university. The Senate, however, uncompromisingly rejected their idea, stating that training "apothecaries, soapmakers, beer-brewers, dyers and vinegar-distillers" was not the university's task. As of 17 December 1825, they ruled that any such institution would have to be a private venture. This decision worked to Liebig's advantage. As an independent venture, he could ignore university rules and accept matriculated and unmatriculated students. Liebig's institute was widely advertised in pharmaceutical journals and opened in 1826. Its classes in practical chemistry and laboratory procedures for chemical analysis were taught in addition to Liebig's formal courses at the university.

From 1825 to 1835, the laboratory was housed in the guardroom of a disused barracks on the edge of town. The main laboratory space was about 38 m^{2} (410 sq ft) in size and included a small lecture room, a storage closet, and a main room with ovens and work tables. An open colonnade outside could be used for dangerous reactions. Liebig could work there with eight or nine students at a time. He lived in a cramped apartment with his wife and children on the floor above.

Liebig was one of the first chemists to organize a laboratory in its present form, engaging with students in empirical research on a large scale through a combination of research and teaching. His methods of organic analysis enabled him to direct the analytical work of many graduate students. Liebig's students were from many of the German states, as well as Britain and the United States. They helped create an international reputation for their Doktorvater. His laboratory became renowned as a model institution for the teaching of practical chemistry. It was also significant for its emphasis on applying discoveries in fundamental research to the development of specific chemical processes and products.

In 1833, Liebig convinced chancellor Justin von Linde to include the institute within the university. In 1839, he obtained government funds to build a lecture theatre and two separate laboratories designed by architect Paul Hofmann. The new chemistry laboratory featured innovative glass-fronted fume cupboards and venting chimneys. By 1852, when he left Giessen for Munich, more than 700 students of chemistry and pharmacy had studied with Liebig.

=== Instrumentation ===
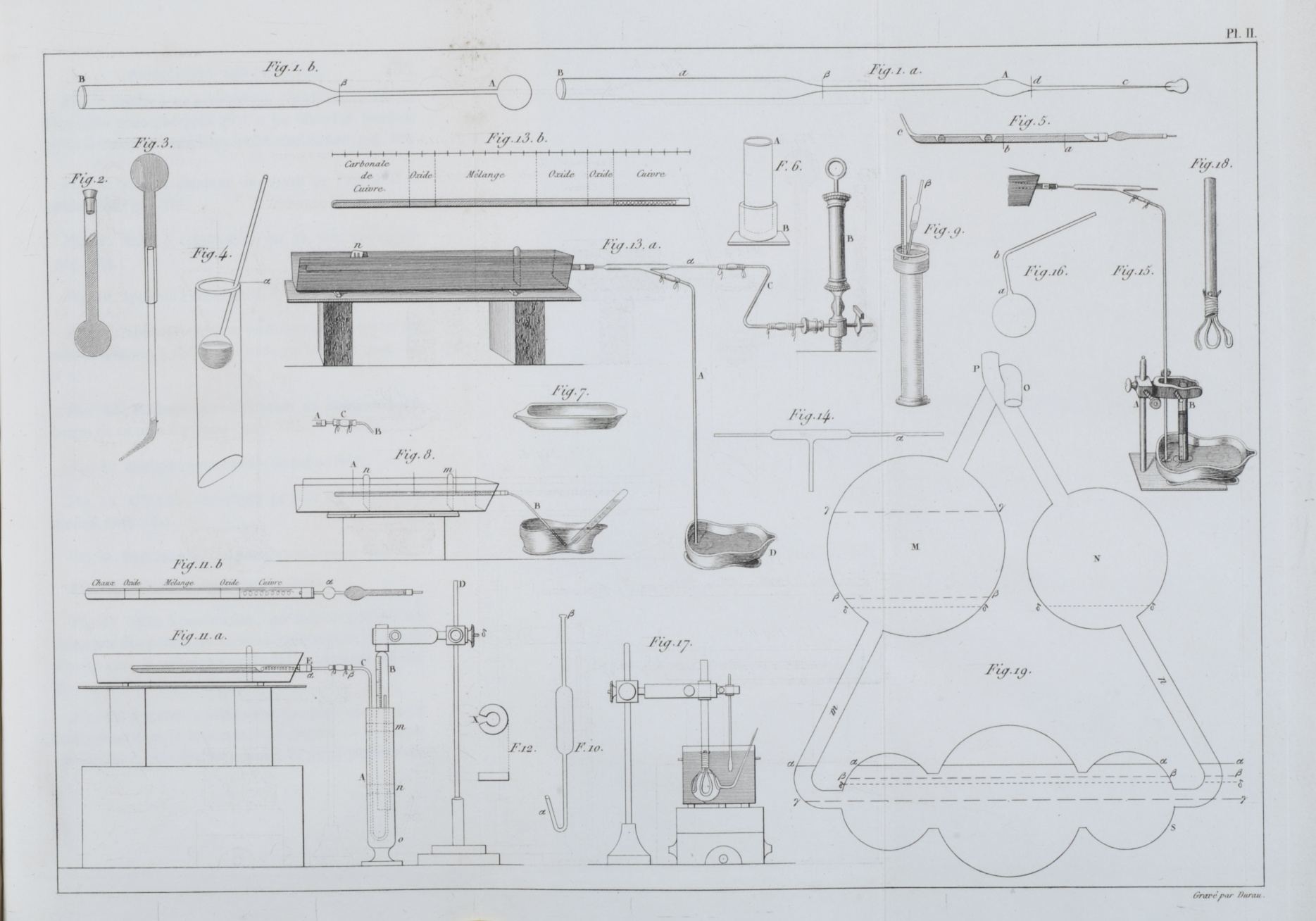
Drawing of apparatus from Liebig's Manuel pour l'analyse des substances organiques, 1848, Kaliapparat in lower right

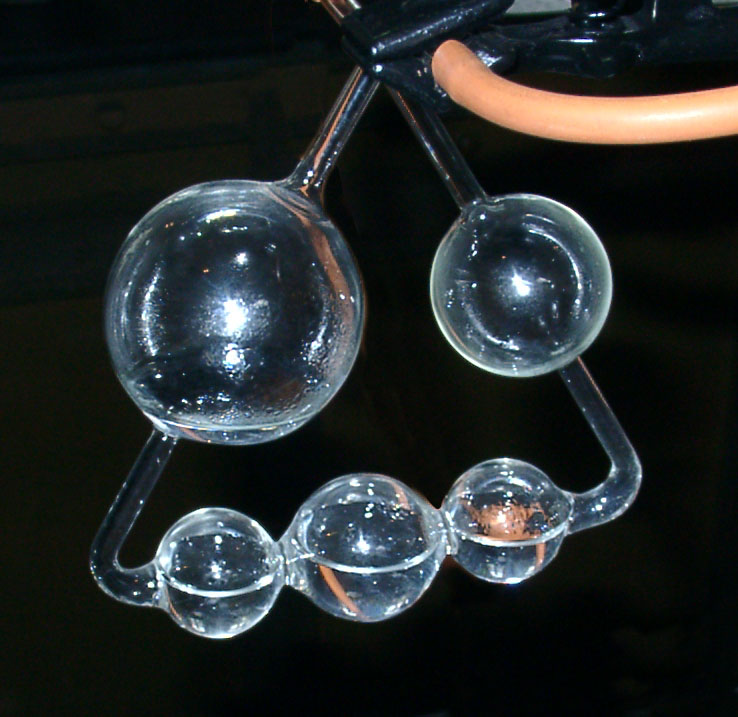
Modern reproduction of the Kaliapparat apparatus

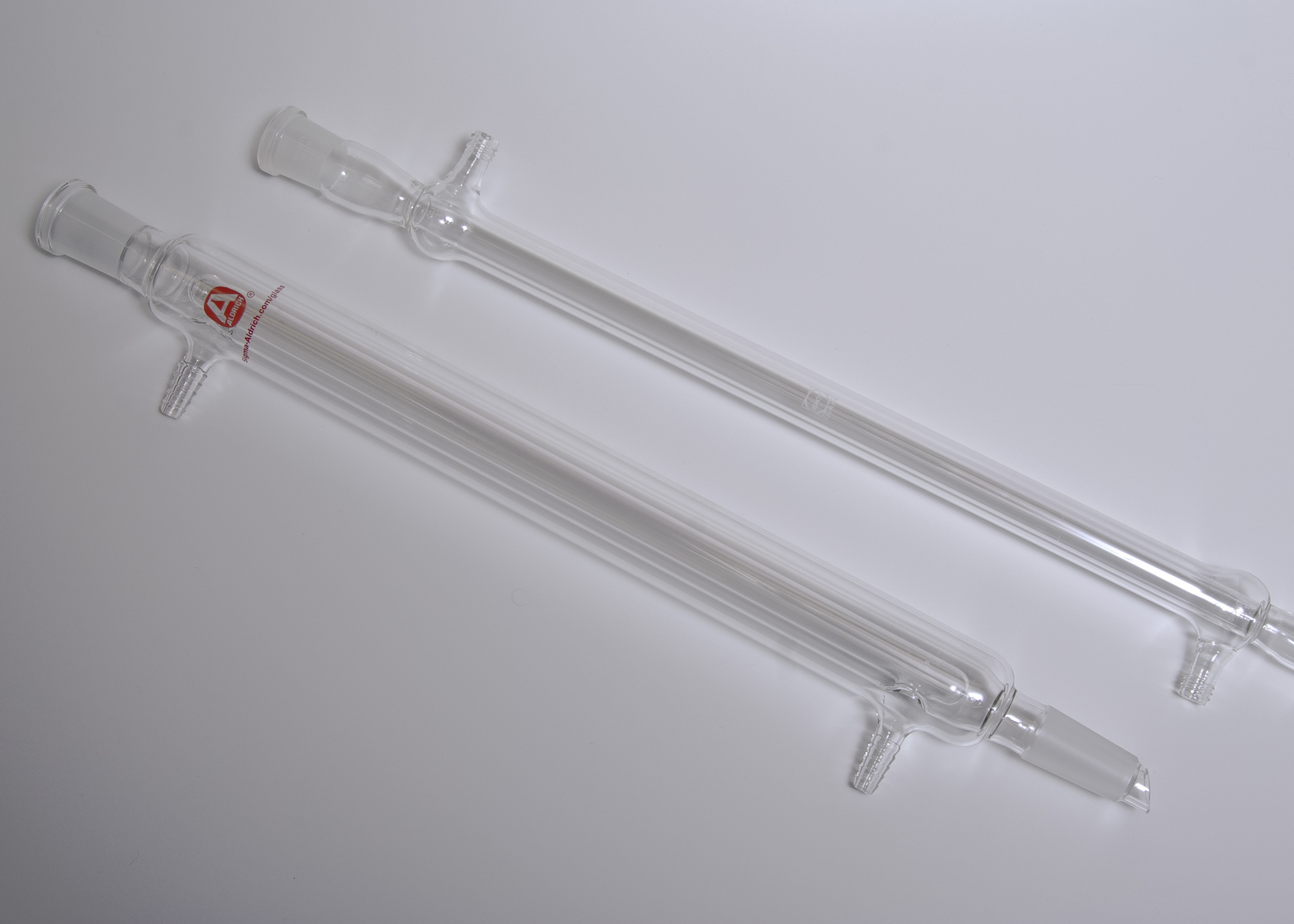
Modern Liebig condenser (left) and West condenser (right)

A significant challenge facing 19th-century organic chemists was the lack of instruments and methods of analysis to support accurate, replicable analyses of organic materials. Many chemists worked on the problem of organic analysis, including French Joseph Louis Gay-Lussac and Swedish Jöns Jacob Berzelius, before Liebig developed his version of an apparatus for determining the carbon, hydrogen, and oxygen content of organic substances in 1830. It involved an array of five glass bulbs, called a Kaliapparat, to trap the oxidation product of the carbon in the sample following its combustion. Before reaching the Kaliapparat, the combustion gases were conducted through a tube containing hygroscopic calcium chloride, which absorbed and retained the oxidation product of the hydrogen of the sample, namely water vapor. Next, in the Kaliapparat, carbon dioxide was absorbed in a potassium hydroxide solution in the three lower bulbs and used to measure the weight of carbon in the sample. For any substance consisting only of carbon, hydrogen, and oxygen, the percentage of oxygen was found by subtracting the carbon and hydrogen percentages from 100%; the remainder must be the percentage of oxygen. A charcoal furnace (a sheet steel tray in which the combustion tube was laid) was used for the combustion. Weighing carbon and hydrogen directly, rather than estimating them volumetrically, significantly increased the method's accuracy of measurement. Liebig's assistant, Carl Ettling, perfected glass-blowing techniques for producing the Kaliapparat and demonstrated them to visitors. Liebig's kaliapparat simplified the method of quantitative organic analysis and rendered it routine. Brock suggests that the availability of a superior technical apparatus was one reason why Liebig was able to attract so many students to his laboratory. His method of combustion analysis was used pharmaceutically, and certainly made possible many contributions to organic, agricultural and biological chemistry.

Liebig also popularized the use of a counter-current water-cooling system for distillation, still referred to as a Liebig condenser. Liebig himself attributed the vapor condensation device to German pharmacist Johann Friedrich August Gottling, who had made improvements in 1794 to a design discovered independently by German chemist Christian Ehrenfried Weigel in 1771, by French scientist P. J. Poisonnier in 1779, and by Finnish chemist Johan Gadolin in 1791.

Although it was not widely adopted until after Liebig's death, when safety legislation finally prohibited the use of mercury in making mirrors, Liebig proposed a process for silvering that eventually became the basis of modern mirror-making. In 1835, he reported that aldehydes reduce silver salts to metallic silver. After working with other scientists, Carl August von Steinheil approached Liebig in 1856 to see if he could develop a silvering technique capable of producing high-quality optical mirrors for use in reflecting telescopes. Liebig developed blemish-free mirrors by adding copper to ammoniated silver nitrate and sugar. An attempt to commercialize the process and "drive out mercury mirror-making and its injurious influence on workers' health" was unsuccessful. Liebig's mirrors struggled commercially due to poor glass, which produced an off-color, greenish-yellow reflection. Rudely, Liebig commented that Frenchwomen especially hated his mirrors because Frenchwomen already looked yellow and sickly, and the mirrors just reminded them how ugly they were.

=== Organic chemistry ===
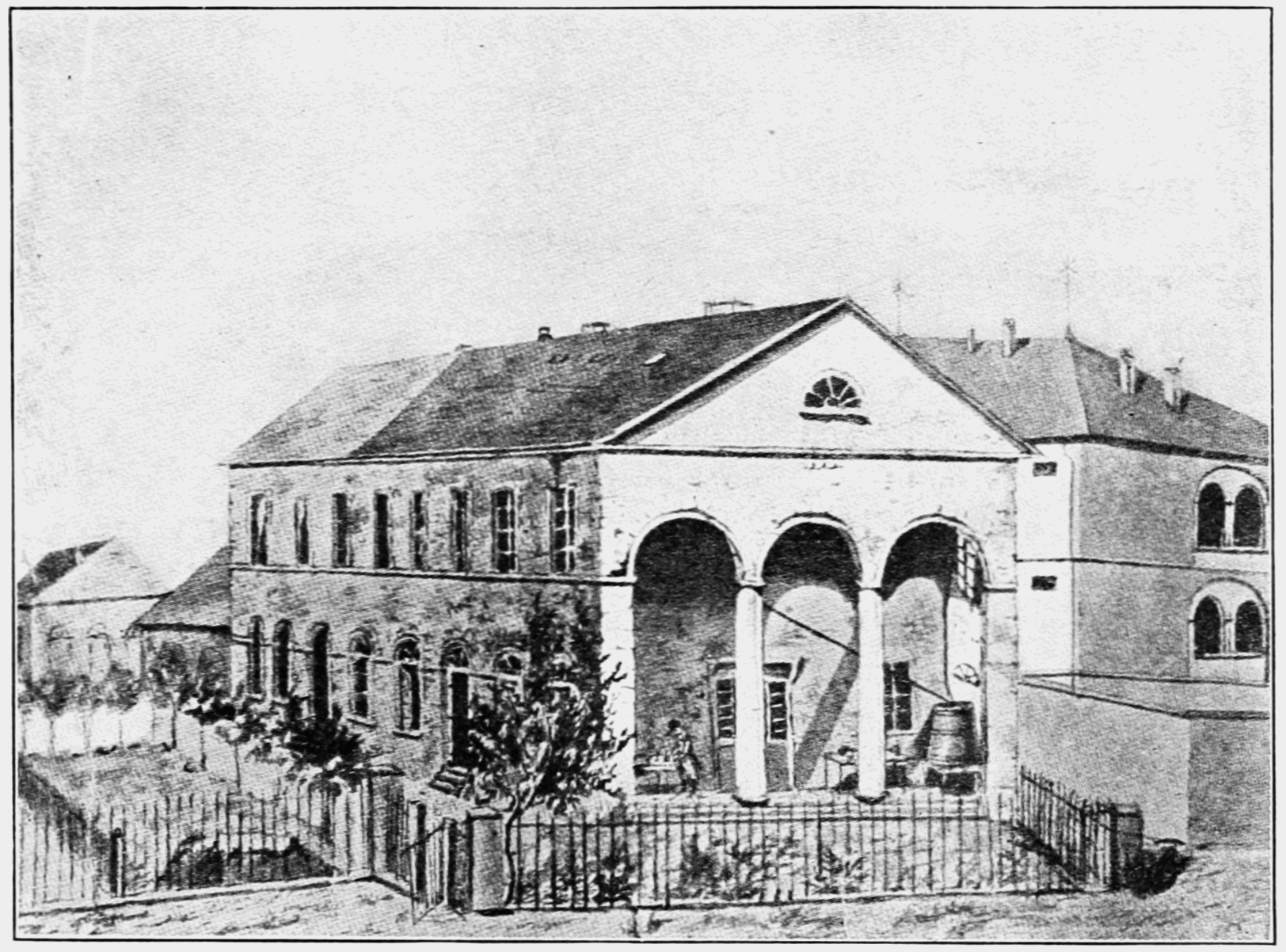
Liebig laboratory, Giessen

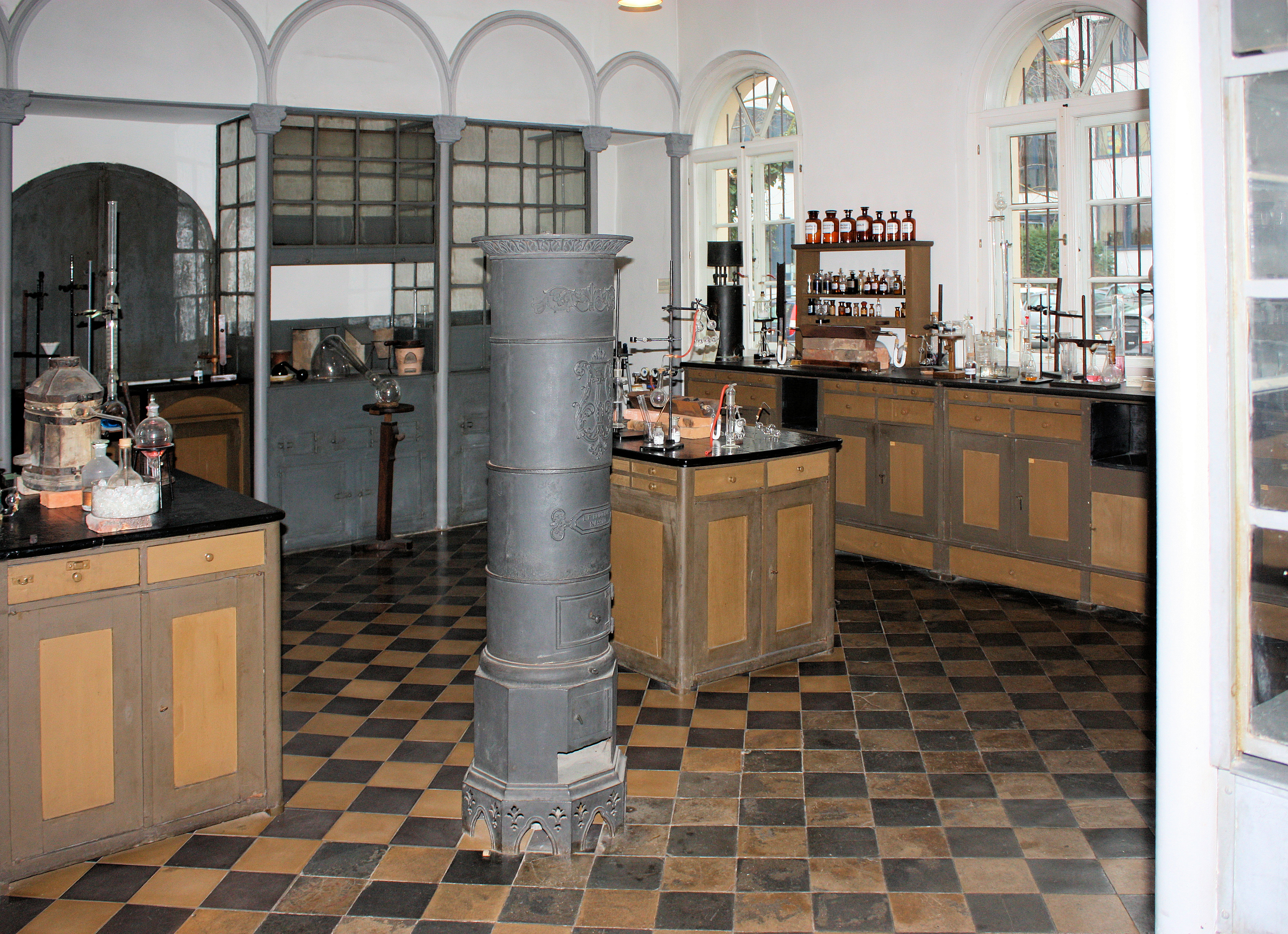
Liebig-Museum, the pharmaceutical laboratory, Giessen

One of Liebig's frequent collaborators was Friedrich Wöhler. They met in 1826 in Frankfurt, after independently reporting on the preparation of two substances, cyanic acid and fulminic acid, that apparently had the same composition, but very different characteristics. The silver fulminate investigated by Liebig was explosive, whereas the silver cyanate found by Wöhler was not. After reviewing the disputed analyses together, they agreed that both were valid. The discovery of these and other substances led Jöns Jacob Berzelius to suggest the idea of isomers, substances that are defined not simply by the number and kind of atoms in the molecule, but also by the arrangement of those atoms.

In 1832, Liebig and Friedrich Wöhler published an investigation of the oil of bitter almonds. They transformed pure oil into several halogenated compounds, which were further transformed in other reactions. Throughout these transformations, "a single compound" (which they named benzoyl) "preserves its nature and composition unchanged in nearly all its associations with other bodies." Their experiments proved that a group of carbon, hydrogen, and oxygen atoms could behave like an element, take the place of an element, and can be exchanged for elements in chemical compounds. This laid the foundation for the doctrine of compound radicals, which can be seen as an early step in the development of structural chemistry.

The 1830s were a period of intense investigation of organic compounds by Liebig and his students, and of vigorous debate about the theoretical implications of their results. Liebig published on a wide variety of topics, personally averaging 30 papers per year between 1830 and 1840. Liebig not only isolated individual substances, but also studied their interrelationships and the ways in which they degraded and metamorphosed into other substances, looking for clues to the understanding of both chemical composition and physiological function. Other significant contributions by Liebig during this time include his examination of the nitrogen content of bases; the study of chlorination and the isolation of chloral (1832); the identification of the ethyl radical (1834); the oxidation of alcohol and formation of aldehyde (1835); the polybasic theory of organic acids (1838); and the degradation of urea (1837).

Writing about the analysis of urine, a complex organic product, he made a declaration that reveals both the changes that were occurring in chemistry over a short time and the impact of his own work. At a time when many chemists such as Jöns Jakob Berzelius still insisted on a hard and fast separation between the organic and inorganic, Liebig asserted:

"The production of all organic substances no longer belongs just to living organisms. It must be seen as not only probable, but as certain, that we shall be able to produce them in our laboratories. Sugar, salicin, and morphine will be artificially produced. Of course, we do not yet know how to do this, because we do not yet know the precursors from which these compounds arise, but we shall come to know them."

— [Liebig and Woehler (1838)]

Liebig's arguments against any chemical distinction between living (physiological) and dead chemical processes proved a great inspiration to several of his students and others who were interested in materialism. Though Liebig distanced himself from the direct political implications of materialism, he tacitly supported the work of Carl Vogt (1817–1895), Jacob Moleschott (1822–1893), and Ludwig Büchner (1824–1899).

=== Plant nutrition ===
By the 1840s, Liebig was attempting to apply theoretical knowledge from organic chemistry to real-world problems of food availability. His book Die organische Chemie in ihrer Anwendung auf Agricultur und Physiologie (Organic Chemistry in its Application to Agriculture and Physiology) (1840) promoted the idea that chemistry could revolutionize agricultural practice, increasing yields and lowering costs. It was widely translated, vociferously critiqued, and highly influential.

Liebig's book discussed chemical transformations within living systems, both plant and animal, outlining a theoretical approach to agricultural chemistry. The book's first part focused on plant nutrition; the second was on chemical mechanisms of putrefaction and decay. Liebig's awareness of both synthesis and degradation led him to become an early advocate of conservation, promoting ideas such as the recycling of sewage.

Liebig argued against prevalent theories about role of humus in plant nutrition, which held that decayed plant matter was the primary source of carbon for plant nutrition. Fertilizers were believed to act by breaking down humus, making it easier for plants to absorb. Associated with such ideas was the belief that some sort of "vital force" distinguished reactions involving organic as opposed to inorganic materials.

Early studies of photosynthesis had identified carbon, hydrogen, oxygen, and nitrogen as important, but disagreed over their sources and mechanisms of action. Carbon dioxide was known to be taken in and oxygen released during photosynthesis, but researchers suggested that oxygen was obtained from carbon dioxide, rather than from water. Hydrogen was believed to come primarily from water. Researchers disagreed about whether sources of carbon and nitrogen were atmospheric or soil-based. Nicolas-Théodore de Saussure's experiments, reported in Recherches Chimiques sur la Végétation (1804), suggested that carbon was obtained from atmospheric rather than soil-based sources. It also indicated that water was a likely source of hydrogen. He also studied the absorption of minerals by plants, and observed that mineral concentrations in plants tended to reflect their presence in the soil in which the plants were grown. However, the implications of De Saussure's results for theories of plant nutrition were neither clearly discussed nor easily understood.

Liebig reaffirmed the importance of De Saussure's findings, and used them to critique humus theories, while regretting the limitations of De Saussure's experimental techniques. Using more precise methods of measurement as a basis for estimation, he pointed out contradictions such as the inability of existing soil humus to provide enough carbon to support the plants growing in it. By the late 1830s, researchers such as Karl Sprengel were using Liebig's methods of combustion analysis to assess manures, concluding that their value could be attributed to their constituent minerals. Liebig synthesized ideas about the mineral theory of plant nutrition and added his own conviction that inorganic materials could provide nutrients as effectively as organic sources.

In his theory of mineral nutrients, Liebig identified the chemical elements of nitrogen (N), phosphorus (P), and potassium (K) as essential to plant growth. He reported that plants acquire carbon (C) and hydrogen (H) from the atmosphere and from water (H_{2}O). In addition to emphasizing the importance of minerals in the soil, he argued that plants feed on nitrogen compounds derived from the air. This assertion was a source of contention for many years, and turned out to be true for legumes, but not for other plants.

Liebig's barrel

Liebig also popularized Carl Sprengel's "theorem of minimum" (known as the law of the minimum), stating that plant growth is not determined by the total resources available, but by the scarcest available resource. A plant's development is limited by the one essential mineral that is in the relatively shortest supply. This concept of limitation can be visualized as "Liebig's barrel", a metaphorical barrel in which each stave represents a different element. A nutrient stave that is shorter than the others will cause the liquid contained in the barrel to spill out at that level. This is a qualitative version of the principles used for determining the application of fertilizer in modern agriculture.

Organic Chemistry was not intended as a guide to practical agriculture. Liebig's lack of experience in practical applications, and differences between editions of the book, fueled considerable criticism. Nonetheless, Liebig's writings had a profound impact on agriculture, spurring experiment and theoretical debate in Germany, England, and France.

One of his most recognized accomplishments is the development of nitrogen-based fertilizer. In the first two editions of his book (1840, 1842), Liebig reported that the atmosphere contained insufficient nitrogen, and argued that nitrogen-based fertilizer was needed to grow the healthiest possible crops. Liebig believed that nitrogen could be supplied in the form of ammonia, and recognized the possibility of substituting chemical fertilizers for natural ones (animal dung, etc.)

He later became convinced that nitrogen was sufficiently supplied by precipitation of ammonia from the atmosphere, and argued vehemently against the use of nitrogen-based fertilizers for many years. An early commercial attempt to produce his own fertilizers was unsuccessful, due to lack of nitrogen in the mixtures. When tested in a farmer's field, Liebig's manure was found to have no appreciable effect.

Liebig's difficulties in reconciling theory and practice reflected that the real world of agriculture was more complex than was at first realized. By the publication of the seventh German edition of Agricultural Chemistry he had moderated some of his views, admitting some mistakes and returning to the position that nitrogen-based fertilizers were beneficial or even necessary.He was instrumental in the use of guano for nitrogen. In 1863 he published the book "Es ist ja die Spitze meines lebens" in which he revised his early perceptions, now appreciating soil life and in particular the biological nitrogen fixation. Nitrogen fertilizers are now widely used throughout the world, and their production is a substantial segment of the chemical industry.

=== Plant and animal physiology ===
Liebig's work on applying chemistry to plant and animal physiology was especially influential. By 1842, he had published Chimie organique appliquée à la physiologie animale et à la pathologie, published in English as Animal Chemistry, or, Organic Chemistry in its Applications to Physiology and Pathology, presenting a chemical theory of metabolism. The experimental techniques used by Liebig and others often involved controlling and measuring diet, and monitoring and analyzing the products of animal metabolism, as indicators of internal metabolic processes. Liebig saw similarities between plant and animal metabolism, and suggested that nitrogenous animal matter was similar to, and derived from, plant matter. He categorized foodstuffs into two groups, nitrogenous materials which he believed were used to build animal tissue, and non-nitrogenous materials which he believed were involved in separate processes of respiration and generation of heat.

French researchers such as Jean-Baptiste Dumas and Jean-Baptiste Boussingault believed that animals assimilated sugars, proteins, and fats from plant materials and that animals could not synthesize complex molecules. Liebig's work suggested a common ability of plants and animals to synthesize complex molecules from simpler ones. His experiments on fat metabolism convinced him that animals must be able to synthesize fats from sugars and starches. Other researchers built upon his work, confirming the abilities of animals to synthesize sugar and build fat.

Liebig also studied respiration, at one point measuring the "ingesta and excreta" of 855 soldiers, a bodyguard of the Grand Duke of Hessen-Darmstadt, for an entire month. He outlined an extremely speculative model of equations in which he attempted to explain how protein degradation might balance within a healthy body and result in pathological imbalances in cases of illness or inappropriate nutrition. This proposed model was justifiably criticized. Berzelius stingingly stated that "this facile kind of physiological chemistry is created at the writing table". Some of the ideas that Liebig had enthusiastically incorporated were not supported by further research. The third and last edition of Animal Chemistry (1846) was substantially revised and did not include the equations.

The third area discussed in Animal Chemistry was fermentation and putrefaction. Liebig proposed chemical explanations for processes such as eremacausis (organic decomposition), describing the rearrangement of atoms as a result of unstable "affinities" reacting to external causes such as air or already decaying substances. Liebig identified the blood as the site of the body's "chemical factory", where he believed processes of synthesis and degradation took place. He presented a view of disease in terms of chemical process, in which healthy blood could be attacked by external contagia; secreting organs sought to transform and excrete such substances; and failure to do so could lead to their elimination through the skin, lungs, and other organs, potentially spreading contagion. Again, although the world was much more complicated than his theory, and many of his individual ideas were later proved wrong, Liebig managed to synthesize existing knowledge in a way that had implications for doctors, sanitarians, and social reformers. The English medical journal The Lancet reviewed Liebig's work and translated his chemical lectures as part of its mission to establish a new era of medicine. Liebig's ideas stimulated medical research, led to the development of better techniques for testing experimental models of metabolism, and pointed to chemistry as fundamental to the understanding of health and disease.

In 1850, Liebig investigated spontaneous human combustion, dismissing the simplistic explanations based on ethanol due to alcoholism.

=== Liebig and the chemistry of food ===
==== Methods of cookery ====
Liebig drew upon his work in plant nutrition and plant and animal metabolism to develop a theory of nutrition, which had implications for cookery. In his Researches on the Chemistry of Food (1847) Liebig argued that eating not only meat fibre, but also meat juices, which contained various inorganic chemicals, was important. These vital ingredients would be lost during conventional boiling or roasting in which cooking liquids were discarded. For optimum nutritional quality, Liebig advised that cooks should either sear the meat initially to retain fluids, or retain and use cooking liquids (as in soups or stews).

Liebig was acclaimed in The Lancet for revealing "the true principles of cookery", and physicians promoted "rational diets" based on his ideas. Well-known British cookery writer Eliza Acton responded to Liebig by modifying the cookery techniques in the third edition of her Modern Cookery for Private Families, and subtitling the edition accordingly. Liebig's idea that "searing meat seals in the juices", though still widely believed, is not true.

==== Liebig's Extract of Meat Company ====
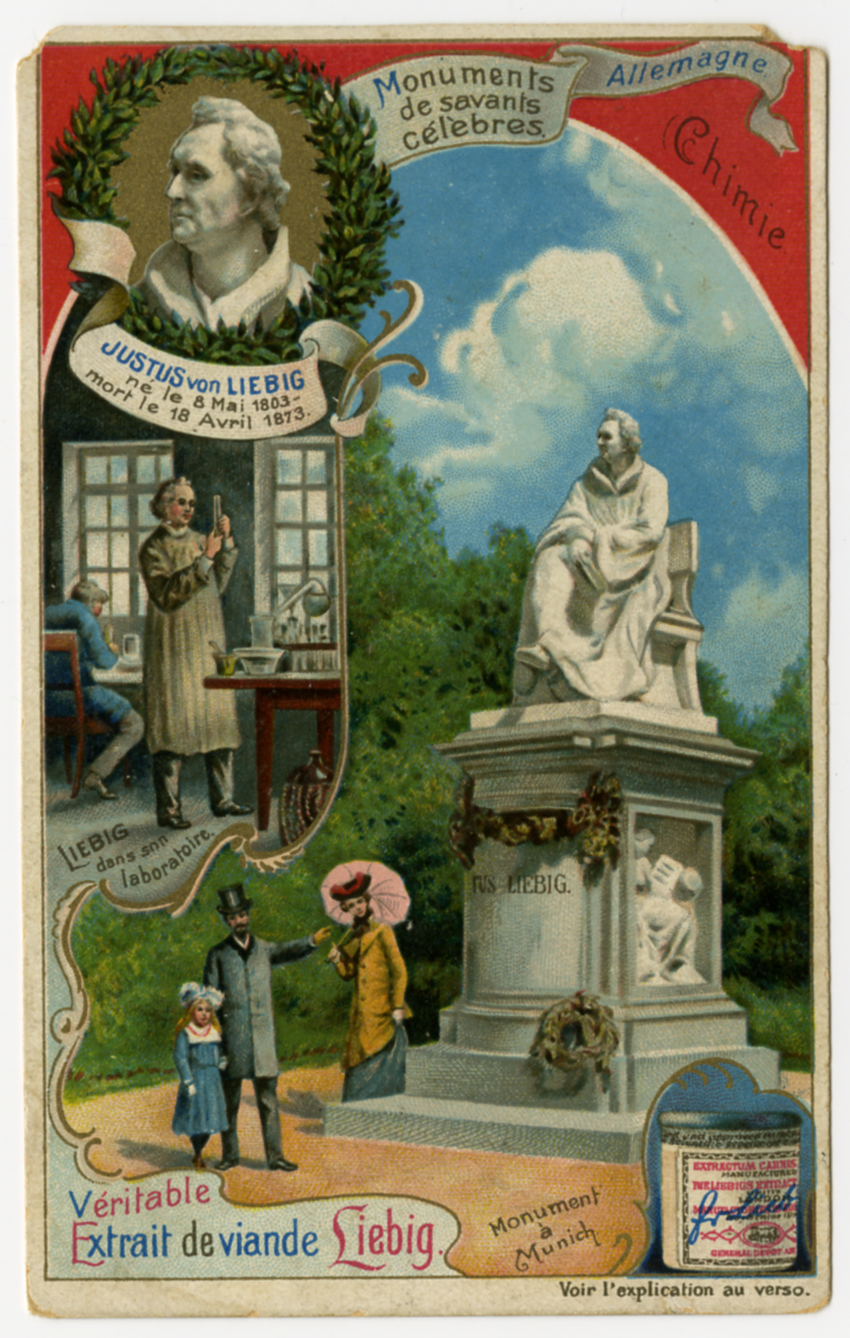
Memorial tradecard commemorating Justus Liebig, from Liebig's Extract of Meat Company

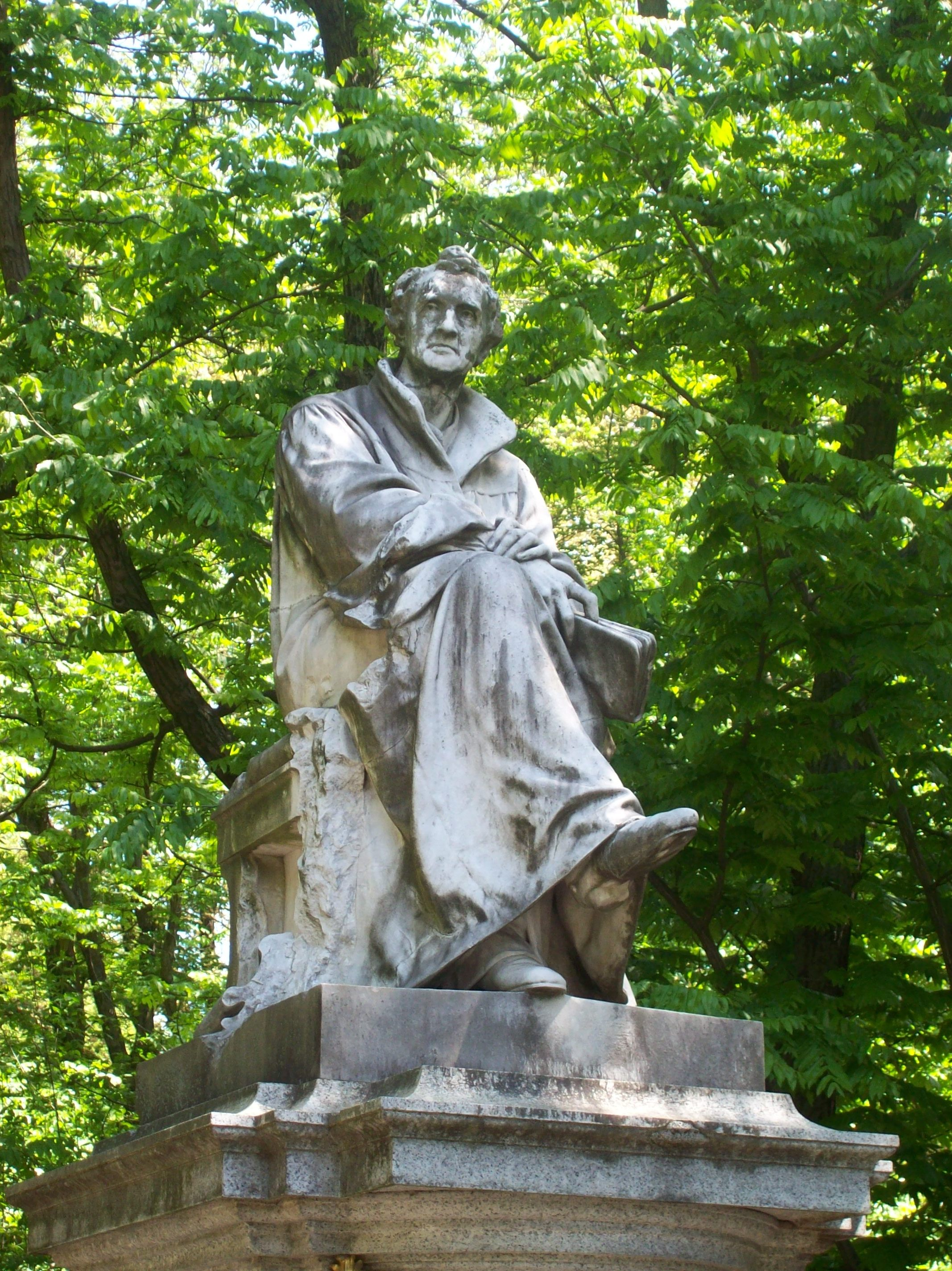
Justus Liebig statue, Munich, Germany

Building on his theories of the nutritional value of meat fluids, and seeking an inexpensive nutrition source for Europe's poor, Liebig developed a formula for producing beef extract. The details were published in 1847 so that "the benefit of it should ... be placed at the command of as large a number of persons as possible by the extension of the manufacture, and consequently a reduction in the cost".

Production was not economically feasible in Europe, where meat was expensive, but in Uruguay and New South Wales, meat was an inexpensive byproduct of the leather industry. In 1865, Liebig partnered with Belgian engineer George Christian Giebert, and was named scientific director of Liebig's Extract of Meat Company, located in Fray Bentos in Uruguay.

Other companies also attempted to market meat extracts under the name "Liebig's Extract of Meat". In Britain, a competitor's right to use the name was successfully defended on the grounds that the name had fallen into general use and become a generic term before the creation of any particular company. The judge asserted that "Purchasers must use their eyes", and considered the presentation of the products to be sufficiently different to enable the discriminating consumer to determine which of the products bore Liebig's signature and was supported by Liebig himself.

Liebig's company initially promoted their "meat tea" for its curative powers and nutritional value as a cheap, nutritious alternative to real meat. But such claims did not hold up to scrutiny. In 1868 the German physiologist Edward Kemmerich ran an experiment involving feeding the extract to dogs, every one of which died. After claims of its nutritional value were questioned, the company emphasized its convenience and flavor, marketing it as a comfort food.

The Liebig company worked with popular cookery writers in various countries to popularize their products. German cookery writer Henriette Davidis wrote recipes for Improved and Economic Cookery and other cookbooks. Katharina Prato wrote an Austro-Hungarian recipe book, Die Praktische Verwerthung Kochrecepte (1879). Hannah M. Young was commissioned in England to write Practical Cookery Book for the Liebig Company. In the United States, Maria Parloa extolled the benefits of Liebig's extract. Colorful calendars and trading cards were also marketed to popularize the product.

The company also worked with British chemist Henry Enfield Roscoe to develop a related product, which it registered some years after Liebig's death, under the "Oxo" trademark. Oxo was trademarked worldwide in 1899 and in the United Kingdom in 1900. Originally a liquid, Oxo was released in cubed solid form in 1911.

==== Marmite ====
Liebig studied other foods, as well. He promoted the use of baking powder to make lighter bread, studied the chemistry of coffee-making and oatmeal. He is considered to have made possible the invention of Marmite, because of his discovery that yeast could be concentrated to form yeast extract.

Infant Formula

Liebig produced some of the world's first infant formula, a breast-milk substitute for babies who could not breast-feed. However, the product proved controversial, even though Liebig did not make any royalties off it. Liebig first came up with the idea based on the struggles of his favorite daughter, Johanna, who struggled to breastfeed her daughter, Carolina, who was born in 1864. (Johanna did not want to seek a wet-nurse, a common but controversial practice at the time.) Carolina, according to Liebig, thrived on the formula. But other scientists were sceptical. One of them, a French doctor in Paris named Jean-Anne-Henri Depaul, decided to test his formula on four infants whose mothers could not suckle.

Liebig himself prepared the first batches of formula. Depaul first gave it to a set of twins, who were born somewhat premature and weighed 2.24 kilograms (4.93 pounds) and 2.64 kg (5.82 lbs.). Both died within two days. Depaul tried it on a third baby, born full-term at 3.37 kg (7.43 lbs.); it soon began passing green "starvation stools" and died within three days. A fourth child, weighing 2.76 kg, also developed green stools and died within four days. At this point, Depaul stopped the experiment.

At first, Depaul kept the experiment to himself. But he attended a meeting of the French Academy of Medicine. And while didn't want to say anything at first, he felt he had to after another member of the Academy rose to speak, a pharmacist named Nicholas-Jean-Baptiste-Gaston Guibourt. Guibourt had grave doubts about Liebig's artificial milk, calling it "fake milk" (in French, "lait factice"). As historian Caroline Lieffers has written, "He [i.e., Guibourt] worried that the substance would either spoil in liquid form or lose its nutritive quality and convenience in solid form." Upon hearing Guibourt speak, Depaul felt it incumbent upon him to speak as well, and mentioned his experiments with Liebig's formula.

Many ethical questions were quickly raised. Publications in France generally supported Depaul, while German publications rallied to Liebig's defense.

== Major works ==
Liebig founded the journal Annalen der Chemie, which he edited from 1832. Originally titled Annalen der Pharmacie, it became Annalen der Chemie und Pharmacie to more accurately reflect its content. It became the leading journal of organic chemistry, and still exists, albeit under the name European Journal of Organic Chemistry after several mergers with other journals. The volumes from his lifetime are often referenced just as Liebigs Annalen; following his death the title was officially changed to Justus Liebig's Annalen der Chemie.

Liebig published widely in Liebigs Annalen and elsewhere, in newspapers and journals. Most of his books were published concurrently in both German and English, and many were translated into other languages, as well. Some of his most influential titles include:

- Ueber das Studium der Naturwissenschaften und über den Zustand der Chemie in Preußen (1840) Digital edition by the University and State Library Düsseldorf
- Die organische Chemie in ihrer Anwendung auf Agricultur und Physiologie; in English, Organic Chemistry in its Application to Agriculture and Physiology (1840)
- Chimie organique appliquée à la physiologie animale et à la pathologie; in English, Animal chemistry, or, Organic chemistry in its applications to physiology and pathology (1842)
- Familiar letters on chemistry and its relation to commerce, physiology and agriculture (1843)
- Chemische Briefe (1844) Digital edition (1865) by the University and State Library Düsseldorf

In addition to books and articles, he wrote thousands of letters, most of them to other scientists.

Liebig also directly influenced the German publication of John Stuart Mill's Logic. Liebig had a close friendship with the Vieweg family publishing house. He arranged for his former student Jacob Schiel (1813–1889) to translate Mill's important work for German publication. Liebig liked Mill's Logic in part because it promoted science as a means to social and political progress, but also because Mill featured several examples of Liebig's research as an ideal for the scientific method. In this way, he sought to reform politics in the German states.

== Later life ==
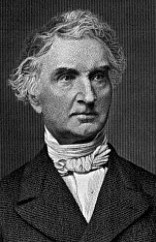
Liebig was president of the Bavarian Academy of Science.

In 1852, after asking Hermann Kopp to take over management of the Annalen der Chemie, Liebig accepted an appointment from King Maximilian II of Bavaria to the Ludwig-Maximilians-Universität München. He also became the Royal scientific advisor to King Maximilian II, who hoped to transform the Ludwig-Maximilians-Universität München into a center for scientific research and development. In part, Liebig accepted the post because, at age 50, he was finding supervision of large numbers of laboratory students increasingly difficult. His new accommodations in Munich reflected this shift in focus. They included a comfortable house suitable for extensive entertaining, a small laboratory, and a newly built lecture theatre capable of holding 300 people with a demonstration laboratory at the front. There, he gave lectures to the university and fortnightly to the public. In his position as a promoter of science, Liebig was appointed president of the Bavarian Academy of Sciences and Humanities, becoming perpetual president of the Royal Bavarian Academy of Sciences in 1858.

In the 1850s, Liebig moved next door to the noted classics scholar and philologist Friederich Thiersch in the city of Munich. Liebig had previously scorned philologists like Thiersch in articles. (Liebig promoted science over supposedly impractical fields like the classics.) But Liebig's most beloved daughter, Johanna, fell in love with Thiersch's second son, Karl, who had studied medicine in several cities, including Berlin and Vienna. Johanna and Karl reportedly had a happy marriage, producing six children: four daughters and two sons. It was fairly common for the sons and daughters of academics to marry in Germany then.

Liebig enjoyed a personal friendship with Maximilian II, who died on 10 March 1864. After Maximilian's death, Liebig and other liberal Protestant scientists in Bavaria were increasingly opposed by ultramontane Catholics.

Liebig died in Munich in 1873, and is buried in the Alter Südfriedhof in Munich.

== Awards and honors ==
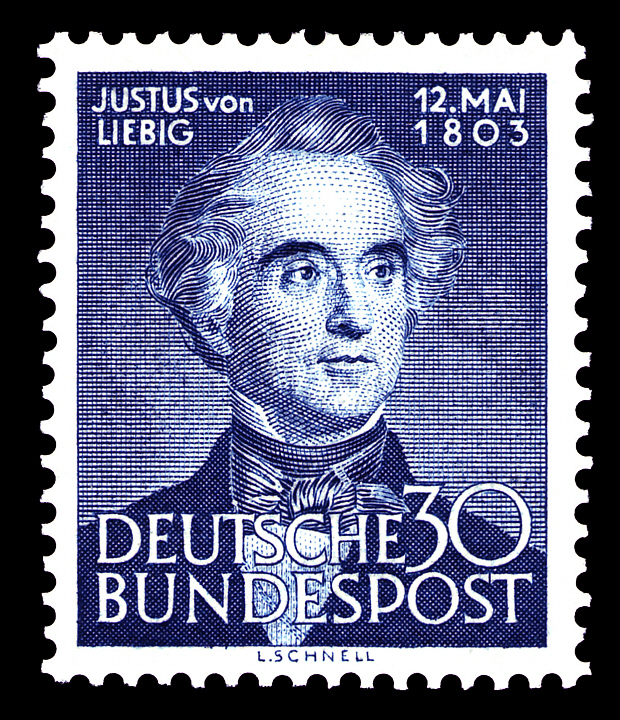
German stamp picturing Justus von Liebig, 1953

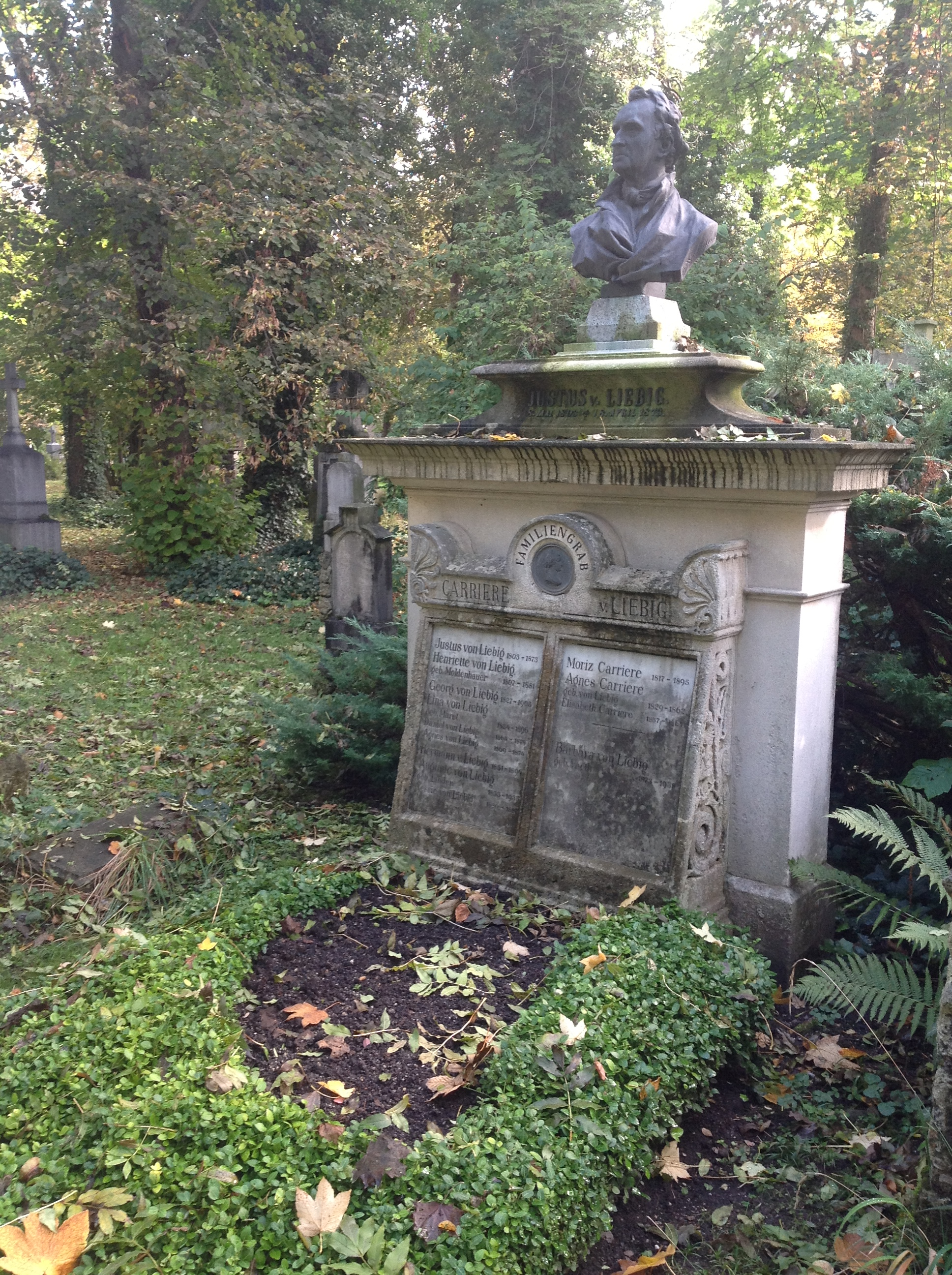
Justus von Liebig grave, Munich, Germany

Liebig was elected a member of the Royal Swedish Academy of Sciences in 1837.

He became a first-class member of the Ludwig Order, founded by Ludwig I, and awarded by Ludwig II on 24 July 1837.

In 1838, he became a correspondent of the Royal Institute of the Netherlands; when that became the Royal Netherlands Academy of Arts and Sciences in 1851, he joined as a foreign member.

The British Royal Society awarded him the Copley Medal "for his discoveries in organic chemistry, and particularly for his development of the composition and theory of organic radicals" in 1840.

In 1841, botanist Stephan Friedrich Ladislaus Endlicher (1804–1849) published a genus of flowering plants from Malesia, belonging to the family Gesneriaceae, as Liebigia in his honour.

King Ludwig II of Bavaria ennobled Liebig on 29 December 1845, conferring on him the hereditary title of Freiherr von Liebig. In English, the closest translation is Baron von Liebig.

In 1850, he received the French Légion d'honneur, presented by chemist Jean-Baptiste Dumas, the French trade minister.

He was honored with the Prussian Order of Merit for Science by Friedrich Wilhelm IV of Prussia in 1851.

He was elected as a member of the American Philosophical Society in 1862.

In 1869, Liebig was awarded the Albert Medal by the Royal Society of Arts, "for his numerous valuable researches and writings, which have contributed most importantly to the development of food-economy and agriculture, to the advancement of chemical science, and to the benefits derived from that science by Arts, Manufactures, and Commerce."

=== Posthumous honors ===
Liebig's portrait appeared on the 100 ℛ︁ℳ︁ banknote issued by the Reichsbank from 1935 until 1945. Printing ceased in 1945 but the note remained in circulation until the issue of the Deutsche Mark on 21 June 1948.

In 1946, after the end of World War II, the University of Giessen was officially renamed after him, "Justus-Liebig-Universität Giessen".

In 1953, the West German post office issued a stamp in his honor.

In 1953, the third General Assembly of the International Scientific Centre of Fertilizers (CIEC), founded in 1932, was organized in Darmstadt to honor Justus von Liebig on the 150th anniversary of his birth.

A portrait of Liebig hangs in the Burlington House headquarters of the Royal Society of Chemistry. It was presented to the society's forerunner, the Chemical Society, by his god-daughter, Mrs Alex Tweedie, née Harley, daughter of Emma Muspratt.

A street (Liebig Avenue) in the Riverdale section of the Bronx, New York is named in honor of Liebig.

=== Liebig medals ===
Some organizations have granted medals in honor of Liebig. In 1871, the Versammlung deutscher Land- und Forstwirte (Assembly of German Farmers and Foresters) was first awarded a Liebig Gold Medal, given to Theodor Reuning. The image was struck from a portrait commissioned in 1869 from Friedrich Brehmer.

For several years, the Liebig Trust Fund, established by Baron Liebig, was administered by the Royal Bavarian Academy of Sciences at Munich and members of the Liebig family. They were empowered to award gold and silver Liebig Medals to deserving German scientists "for the purpose of encouraging research in agricultural science". Silver medals could be awarded to scientists from other countries. Some of those who received medals include:

- 1893, silver, Sir John Lawes and Joseph Henry Gilbert, England
- 1894, silver, Professor Eugene Woldemar Hilgard, United States, "for meritorious work in the investigation of the physical and chemical properties of soils."
- 1896, gold, Professor Friedrich Stohmann, professor of agricultural chemistry in Leipzig University.
- 1899, gold, Albert Schultz-Lupitz, Germany
- 1908, gold, Max Rubner, Germany

In 1903, the Verein deutscher Chemiker (Association of German Chemists) also had a medal struck using Brehmer's portrait. Their Liebig Medal was first awarded in 1903 to Adolf von Baeyer, and in 1904 to Dr. Rudolf Knietsch of the Badische Anilin- und Soda-Fabrik. As of 2024, it continues to be awarded.

At the third World Congress of CIEC, held at Heidelberg in 1957, the "Sprengel-Liebig Medal" was awarded to Dr. E. Feisst, president of CIEC, for outstanding contributions in agricultural chemistry.

== See also ==
- History of soil science
- List of chemists

== Sources ==
- Berghoff, E. (1954), "Justus von Liebig, founder of physiological chemistry", Wien. Klin. Wochenschr., vol. 66, no. 23 (published 11 June 1954), pp. 401–2, PMID 13187963
- Brock, William H. (1997). Justus von Liebig : the chemical gatekeeper (1st ed.). Cambridge, U.K.: Cambridge University Press. ISBN 9780521562249.
- Buttner, J. (2000), "Justus von Liebig and his influence on clinical chemistry.", Ambix, vol. 47, no. 2 (published July 2000), pp. 96–117, doi:10.1179/000269800790418385, PMID 11640225
- Glas, E. (1976), "The Liebig-Mulder controversy. On the methodology of physiological chemistry", Janus; revue internationale de l'histoire des sciences, de la médecine, de la pharmacie, et de la technique, vol. 63, no. 1–2–3, pp. 27–46, PMID 11610199
- Guggenheim, K. Y. (1985), "Johannes Müller and Justus Liebig on nutrition.", Korot, vol. 8, no. 11–12, pp. 66–76, PMID 11614053
- Halmai, J. (1963), "Justus Liebig", Orvosi Hetilap, vol. 104 (published 11 August 1963), pp. 1523–4, PMID 13952197
- Kempler, K. (1973), "[Justus Liebig]", Orvosi Hetilap, vol. 114, no. 22 (published 3 June 1973), pp. 1312–7, PMID 4576434
- Kirschke, Martin (2003), "Liebig, his university professor Karl Wilhelm Gottlob Kastner (1783–1857) and his problematic relation with romantic natural philosophy.", Ambix, vol. 50, no. 1 (published March 2003), pp. 3–24, doi:10.1179/000269803790220066, PMID 12921103
- Knapp, G. F. (1903), "Zur Hundertsten Wiederkehr: Justus von Liebig nach dem Leben gezeichnet", Berichte der Deutschen Chemischen Gesellschaft, 36 (2): 1315–1330, doi:10.1002/cber.19030360202.
- Liebig, Georg von (1890), "Nekrolog: Justus von Liebig. Eigenhändige biographische Aufzeichnungen", Berichte der deutschen chemischen Gesellschaft, 23 (3): 817–828, doi:10.1002/cber.18900230391
- Rosenfeld, Louis (2003), "Justus Liebig and animal chemistry.", Clin. Chem., vol. 49, no. 10 (published October 2003), pp. 1696–707, doi:10.1373/49.10.1696, PMID 14500604
- Rossiter, Margaret (1975) The Emergence of Agricultural Science: Justus Liebig and the Americans, 1840-1880. New Haven: Yale University Press. 1975. ISBN 978-0-300-01721-2.
- Schmidt, F. (1953), "To Justus von Liebig on his 150th birthday, 12 May 1953", Pharmazie, vol. 8, no. 5 (published May 1953), pp. 445–6, PMID 13088290
- Schneider, W. (1953), "Justus von Liebig and the Archiv der Pharmazie; in memory of Liebig's birthday, 12 May 1803", Archiv der Pharmazie und Berichte der Deutschen Pharmazeutischen Gesellschaft, vol. 286, no. 4, pp. 165–72, doi:10.1002/ardp.19532860402, PMID 13081110, S2CID 98065788
- Sonntag, O. (1974), "Liebig on Francis Bacon and the utility of science", Annals of Science, vol. 31, no. 5 (published September 1974), pp. 373–86, doi:10.1080/00033797400200331, PMID 11615416
- Sonntag, O. (1977), "Religion and science in the thought of Liebig", Ambix, vol. 24, no. 3 (published November 1977), pp. 159–69, doi:10.1179/amb.1977.24.3.159, PMID 11610495
- Thomas, U. (1988), "Philipp Lorenz Geiger and Justus Liebig.", Ambix, vol. 35, no. 2, pp. 77–90, doi:10.1179/amb.1988.35.2.77, PMID 11621581
- "Zur Erinnerung an Justus von Liebig", Journal für Praktische Chemie, 8 (1): 428–458, 1873, doi:10.1002/prac.18740080148.
