= Leite =

Leite ([ˈlɐjtɨ] or [ˈlejtʃi]) is a Portuguese and Galician surname (literally Milk) that may refer to:

- Adriano Leite Ribeiro, better known as Adriano (born 1982), Brazilian footballer
- Alexandre Leite (born 1989), Brazilian politician
- Cláudia Cristina Leite Inácio Pedreira (born 1980), Brazilian singer
- Daniela Leite, (born 1988), Brazilian group rhythmic gymnast
- David Leite (born 1960), Portuguese-American food writer, cookbook author, memoirist, and publisher of the website Leite's Culinaria
- Eduardo Leite (born 1985), Brazilian politician, governor of Rio Grande do Sul
- Gabriela Leite (1951-2013), Brazilian prostitute and advocate for rights of sex workers
- George Leite (1920-1985), Portuguese-American author, publisher, bookseller, and native plants nursery owner
- Izabelle Leite (born 1990), Brazilian model and Bollywood actress
- José Batista Leite da Silva (born 1979), Brazilian footballer
- José Leite Lopes (1918-2006), Brazilian theoretical physicist in the field of quantum field theory and particle physics
- Ricardo Izecson dos Santos Leite, better known as Kaká (born 1982), Brazilian footballer
- Luiz Tadeu Martins Leite, better known as Tadeuzinho (born 1986), Brazilian politician
- Marina Leite, Brazilian and American materials scientist
- Rodrigo Ifrano dos Santos Leite, better known as Digão (born 1985), Brazilian footballer

== See also ==
- Leiter
- Leites
- Leitner
