= Schöniger oxidation =

Method of elemental analysis

In chemistry, the Schöniger oxidation (also known as the Schöniger flask test or the oxygen flask method) is a method of elemental analysis developed by Wolfgang Schöniger.

The test is conducted in an Erlenmeyer flask, or in a separatory funnel. It involves the combustion of a sample in pure oxygen, followed by the absorption of the combustion products by a solution of sodium hydroxide.

It allows quantitative determination of elemental chlorine, nitrogen and sulfur in a sample.
