= Kaliapparat =

Liebig apparatus for carbon analysis after combustion of organic compounds

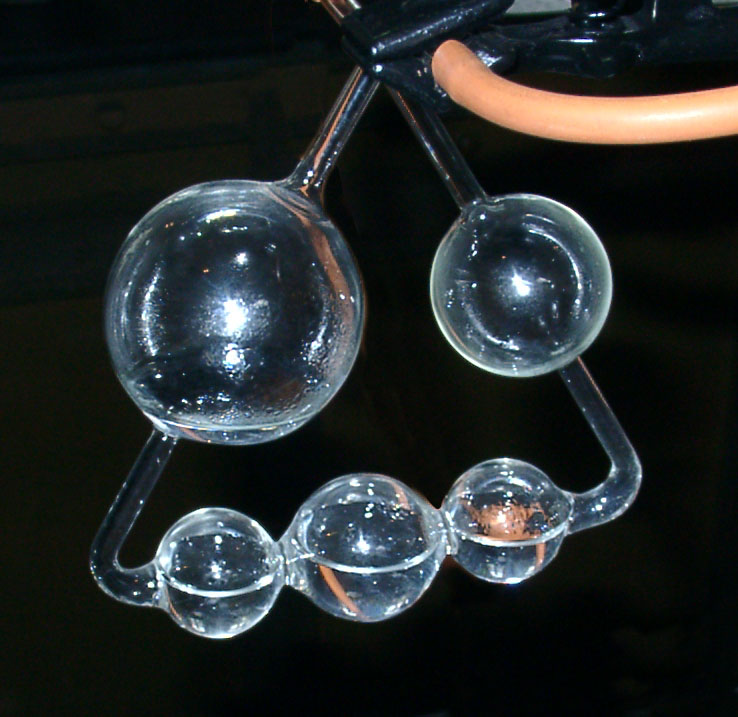
A kaliapparat

A kaliapparat is a laboratory device invented in 1831 by Justus von Liebig (1803–1873) for measuring the amount of carbon in organic compounds. The device, made of glass, consists of a series of five bulbs connected and arranged in a triangular shape. A stylized symbol of a kaliapparat was used in the American Chemical Society logo from 1909 to 2026, originally designed in the early 20th century by Tiffany's Jewelers.

== Operation ==
=== Kaliapparat ===
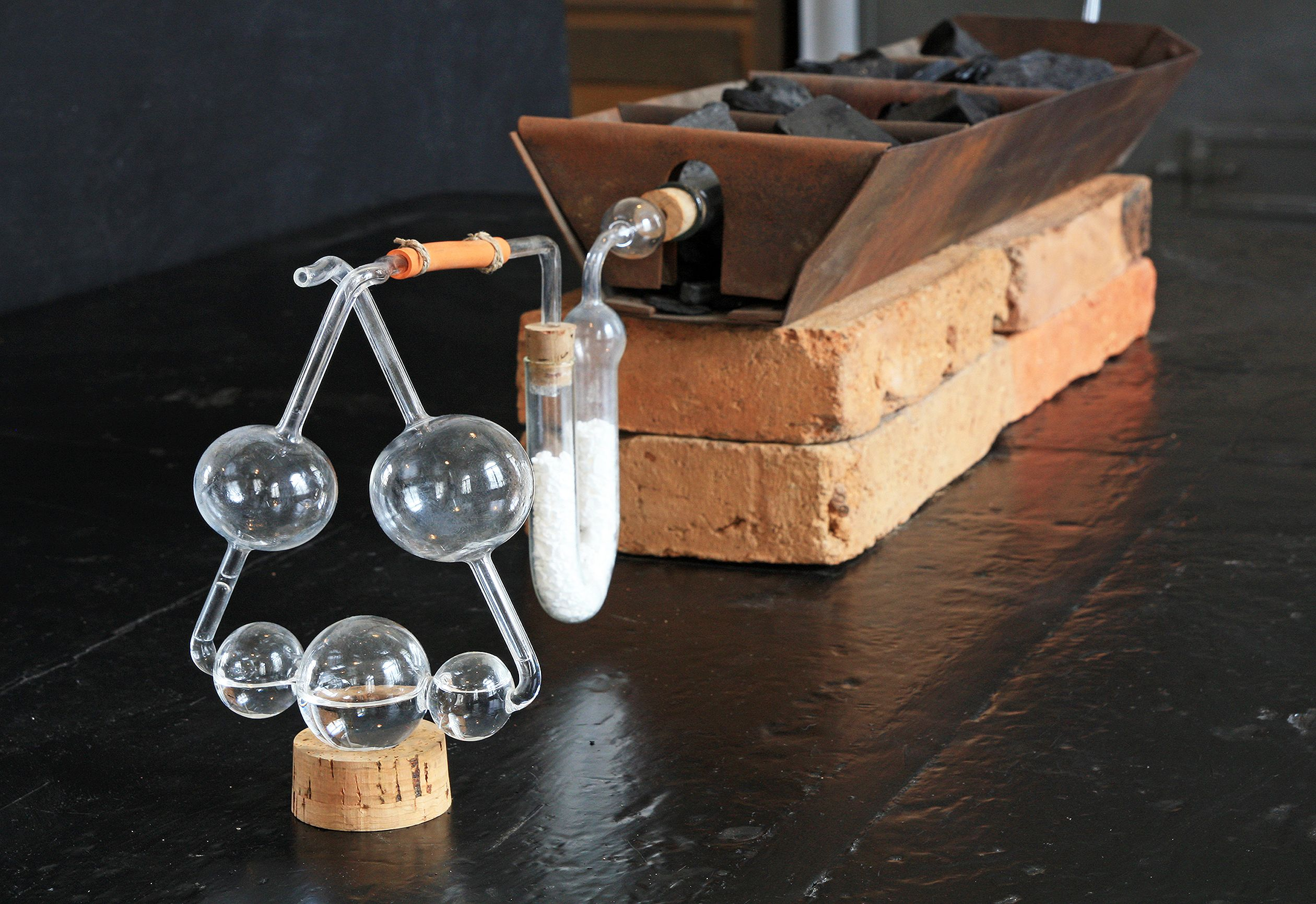
A combustion train replicating Liebig's setupfor elementary analysis. It begins with a heating tray containing a test tube containing the sample and copper oxide. Next comes a U-tube containing a powder that absorbs water. Next comes the kaliapparat with a strong base inside to absorb carbon dioxide. From the Liebig Museum in Giessen, Germany.

The kaliapparat was designed for combustion analysis of organic compounds in a combustion train. The overall operation:

- Prepare a purified sample of a compound to do elemental analysis on.
- Mix sample evenly with a large excess of copper oxide, which is the oxidizer.
- Place the mixture in a long test tube. Place the test tube in an oven.
- Connect the end of the tube to another tube packed with a dry hygroscopic powder (magnesium perchlorate or calcium chloride) to absorb water.
- Connect the tube to the kaliapparat, containing a strong base (for instance potassium hydroxide) to absorb carbon dioxide.
- Check that everything is air-tight.
- Heat the oven to a temperature that allows oxidation, but not so high as to cause "bumping" in the test tube from excessively fast oxidation.
- Eventually, the bubbling stops, indicating that the sample has fully oxidized into water, carbon dioxide, and nitrogen.

By weighing the water-absorption tube before and after the experiment, one measures the total mass of water released by the oxidation reaction. This then provides a measurement of the hydrogen content of the sample. Quantitatively, let the increase in mass be $\Delta m_{H_2O}$, then the mass of hydrogen in the original sample is $m_H = \tfrac{2}{20}\Delta m_{H_2O}$.

By weighing the kaliapparat before and after the experiment, one measures the total mass of carbon dioxide. This then provides a measurement of the carbon content of the sample by using the stoichiometric formula 2 KOH + CO_{2} → K_{2}CO_{3} + H_{2}O, where the water stays inside the kaliapparat as well. Quantitatively, let the increase in mass be $\Delta m_{kali}$, then $\Delta m_{kali} = \Delta m_{CO_2}$, and the mass of carbon in the original sample is $m_C = \tfrac{32}{44}\Delta m_{CO_2}$.

This then yields the mass-fraction of carbon and hydrogen in the sample: $m\%_{C} = \tfrac{m_C}{m_{\text{sample}}}, m\%_{H} = \tfrac{m_H}{m_{\text{sample}}}$.

The mass-fraction of oxygen is $m\%_{O} = 1 - m\%_{C} - m\%_{H} - m\%_{N}$.

=== Nitrogen ===
Liebig found that measuring the amount of nitrogen to be much more difficult than measuring the amount of hydrogen and carbon. The main issue is that nothing absorbs nitrogen into a solid form, so he had to resort to volumetric analysis. That is, he would burn the sample and collect the combustion gas in a volumetric beaker, then add concentrated aqueous potassium hydroxide to absorb the carbon dioxide, leaving behind just nitrogen. He found the method inaccurate, especially for alkaloid substances, which contain only a very small amount of nitrogen.

The disappointment concerning alkaloids led Liebig to turn to synthetic organic chemistry, where, instead of trying to understand what an organic chemical is by trying to break it down into known components, the experimenter would attempt to synthesize the substance using known components.

== Design ==
The kaliapparat serves several functions. The bottom 3 bulbs contain the strong base which would absorb the carbon dioxide. The entrance and exit bulbs serve as safety, to prevent the strong base in the bottom 3 bulbs from overflowing in either direction.

By monitoring the rate of bubbling in the last bottom bulb, the experimenter can check whether the reaction is complete. There should be little or no bubbling if the substance contains no nitrogen. If the substance contains nitrogen, then the bubbling should consist of a continuous and even stream of small bubbles. If there is too much bubbling, then the experimenter would know that not all carbon dioxide is being absorbed. The experimenter then must stop the experiment, discard its data, and redo the experiment.

Before starting the reaction, by sucking on one end of the kaliapparat and watching the liquid level in the entrance bulb, the experimenter can check whether the set up is properly air tight.

Modern reenacters have found that the parameters of the kaliapparat are quite optimized, indicating that Liebig probably iterated the design into the optimized form by much practical experience.

== Significance ==
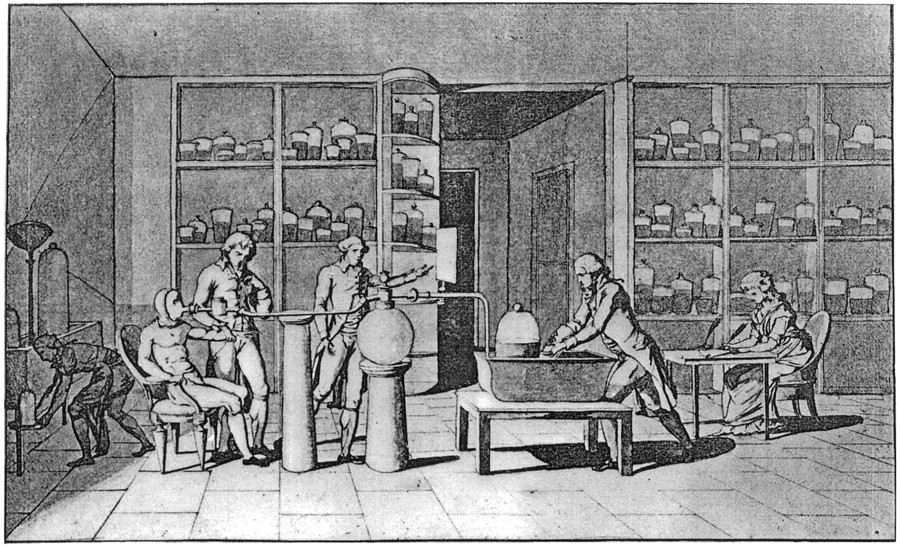
Lavoisier conducting an experiment on respiration in the 1770s

Before the kaliapparat, chemical analysis was done similar to Lavoisier's method. The analysis device would be a complex arrangement of various containers, tubes, valves, etc, consisting of brass, glass, iron, etc. The device would be expensive and requires high skill to operate, usually by accomplished masters of the field, who are usually rich enough to afford the complex instruments. The kaliapparat is easy and fast to operate, incorporates error-monitoring features, and is relatively cheap to produce. It allowed chemists to analyze many substances faster and more accurately, and allow even students to perform accurate analyses. In this way, it contributed to the professionalization of how chemistry is conducted, changing it from a practice done by a few skilled masters, to a practice done by university research groups, with students around professors working in research groups.

== See also ==
- CHN analyzer
- Combustion analysis
- Dumas method of molecular weight determination
- Elemental analysis
- Total organic carbon
