= Elemental analysis =

Process of analytical chemistry

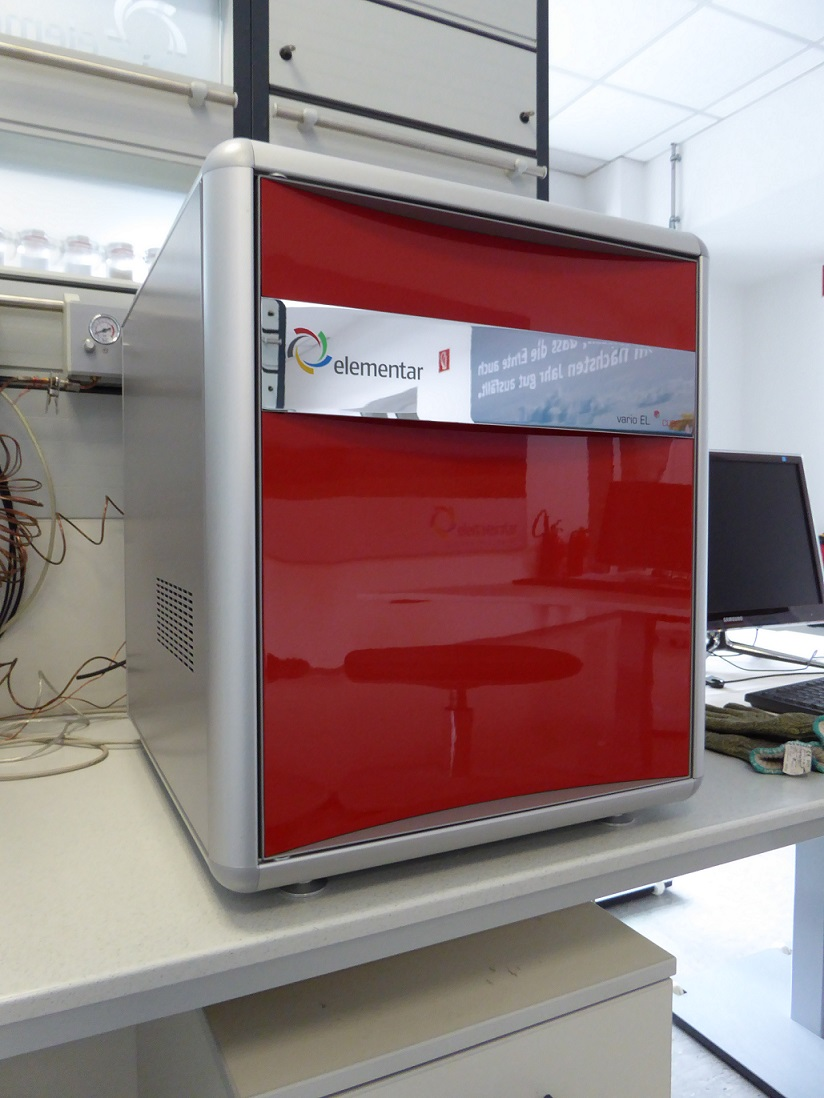
Modern simultaneous CHNS combustion analyzer

Elemental analysis is a process where a sample of some material (e.g., soil, waste or drinking water, bodily fluids, minerals, chemical compounds) is analyzed for its elemental and sometimes isotopic composition. Elemental analysis can be qualitative (determining what elements are present), and it can be quantitative (determining how much of each is present). Elemental analysis falls within the ambit of analytical chemistry, the instruments involved in deciphering the chemical nature of our world.

== History ==
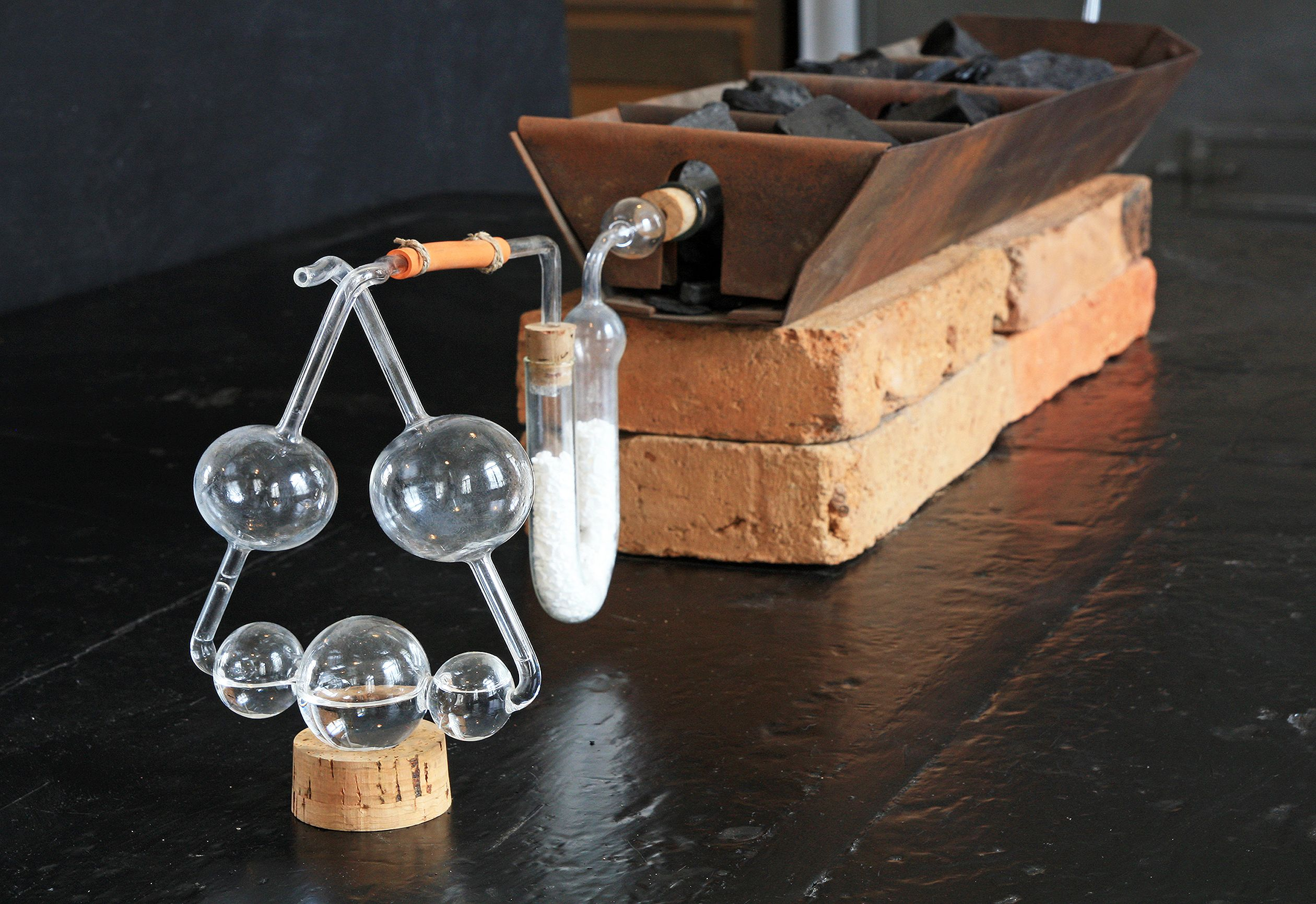
The Kaliapparat for elementary analysis in the Liebig Museum in Giessen, Germany.

Antoine Lavoisier is regarded as the inventor of elemental analysis as a quantitative, experimental tool to assess the chemical composition of a compound. At the time, elemental analysis was based on the gravimetric determination of specific absorbent materials before and after selective adsorption of the combustion gases. Today fully automated systems based on thermal conductivity or infrared spectroscopy detection of the combustion gases, or other spectroscopic methods are used.

== CHNX analysis ==
For organic chemists, elemental analysis or "EA" almost always refers to CHNX analysis—the determination of the mass fractions of carbon, hydrogen, nitrogen, and heteroatoms (X) (halogens, sulfur) of a sample. This information is important to help determine the structure of an unknown compound, as well as to help ascertain the structure and purity of a synthesized compound. In present-day organic chemistry, spectroscopic techniques (NMR, both ^{1}H and ^{13}C), mass spectrometry and chromatographic procedures have replaced EA as the primary technique for structural determination. However, it still gives very useful complementary information.

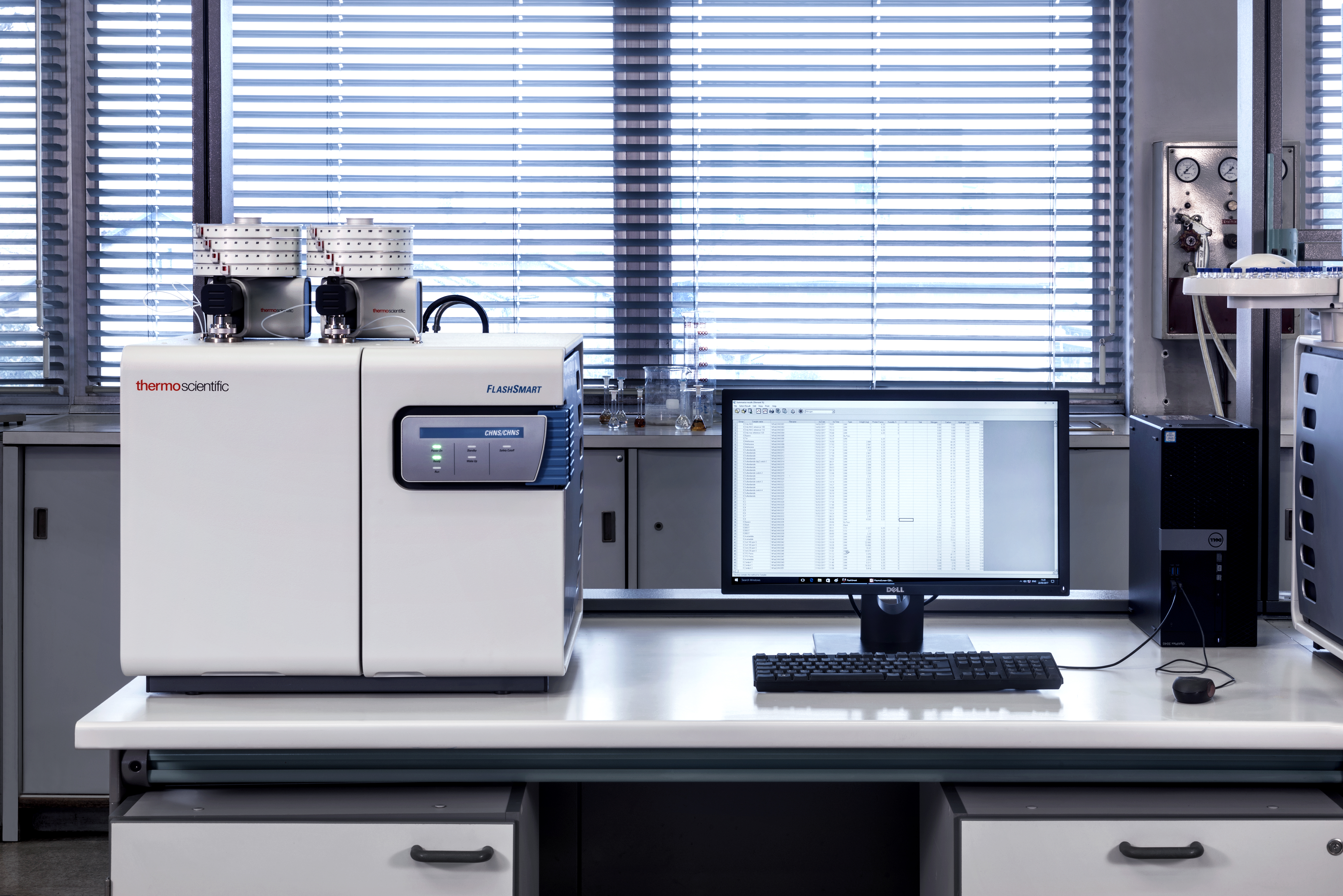
Elemental Analyzer System

The most common form of elemental analysis, CHNS analysis, is accomplished by combustion analysis. Modern elemental analyzers are also capable of simultaneous determination of sulfur along with CHN in the same measurement run.

== Quantitative analysis ==
Quantitative analysis determines the mass of each element or compound present. Other quantitative methods include gravimetry, optical atomic spectroscopy, and neutron activation analysis.

Gravimetry is where the sample is dissolved, the element of interest is precipitated and its mass measured, or the element of interest is volatilized, and the mass loss is measured.

Optical atomic spectroscopy includes flame atomic absorption, graphite furnace atomic absorption, and inductively coupled plasma atomic emission spectroscopy, which probe the outer electronic structure of atoms.

Neutron activation analysis involves the activation of a sample matrix through the process of neutron capture. The resulting radioactive target nuclei of the sample begin to decay, emitting gamma rays of specific energies that identify the radioisotopes present in the sample. The concentration of each analyte can be determined by comparison to an irradiated standard with known concentrations of each analyte.

== Qualitative analysis ==
To qualitatively determine which elements exist in a sample, the methods are mass spectrometric atomic spectroscopy, such as inductively coupled plasma mass spectrometry, which probes the mass of atoms; other spectroscopy, which probes the inner electronic structure of atoms such as X-ray fluorescence, particle-induced X-ray emission, X-ray photoelectron spectroscopy, and Auger electron spectroscopy; and chemical methods such as the sodium fusion test and Schöniger oxidation.

== Analysis of results ==
The analysis of results is performed by determining the ratio of elements from within the sample and working out a chemical formula that fits with those results. This process is useful as it helps determine if a sample sent is the desired compound and confirms the purity of a compound. The accepted deviation of elemental analysis results from the calculated is 0.3%.

== See also ==
- Dumas method of molecular weight determination
