= Leiter =

Leiter is a surname. Notable people with the surname include:

- A family of American baseball pitchers:
  - Al Leiter (born 1965), left-hander
  - Jack Leiter (born 2000), son of Al, right-hander
  - Mark Leiter (born 1963), brother of Al, right-hander
  - Mark Leiter Jr. (born 1991), son of Mark, right-hander
- Brian Leiter, American philosopher and legal scholar
- Felix Leiter, fictional character in the James Bond series
- Ken Leiter, American ice hockey player
- Levi Leiter, American businessman
- Mark Leiter (US Businessman), Chief Strategy Officer at Nielsen
- Michael Leiter, former director, National Counterterrorism Center
- Saul Leiter, photographer and artist
- Yechiel Leiter, American-born Israeli historian of philosophy, public policy analyst, rabbi and settlement activist, Israeli ambassador to the United States

== See also ==
- Leiter, Wyoming, a community in the United States
- The Leiter Report, a report on university professors of philosophy edited by Brian Leiter
- The Second Leiter Building, also known as the Sears Building, in Chicago
- Leiter International Performance Scale, an intelligence test
- Leite
- Leitner
- Gauleiter, an administrator (leader) of a gau (district) in pre-World War II Germany
