= Wilhelm Henneberg =

German chemist (1825–1890)

- Born: 10 September 1825; Wasserleben near Wernigerode
- Died: 22 November 1890 (aged 65); Greene near Kreiensen, German Empire
- Education: University of Jena
- Known for: Weende analysis
- Scientific career
- Workplaces: University of Göttingen
- Doctoral advisor: Justus von Liebig

Wilhelm Henneberg (10 September 1825 – 22 November 1890) was a German chemist and student of Justus von Liebig.

== Life ==
He attended the Collegium Carolinum in Brunswick and studied at the University of Giessen with Justus von Liebig and at the University of Jena where he received his Ph.D. in 1849. It was under the influence of Liebig that Henneberg decided to devote his career to agricultural chemistry.

In 1852 he became secretary of the Königlich Hannoverschen Landwirtschaftsgesellschaft (Royal Hanoverian Agricultural Society) in Celle, and in 1857 was named director of the newly established agricultural experiment station in Weende-Göttingen. In 1865 he became an associate professor, and in 1873, a full professor at the University of Göttingen.

At the Weende agricultural station, with Friedrich Stohmann, he developed a proximate system for routine analysis of animal feed that is now referred to as the "Weende analysis". With Stohmann, he was co-author of Beiträge zur Begründung einer rationellen Fütterung der Wiederkäuer (Contributions to the rational feeding of ruminants).

== External links and references ==
- Biography from a school in Weende
- Institute for Animal Nutrition and Animal Physiology in Goettingen
- Lenkeit, W. (1975). "Zum 150. Geburtstag von Wilhelm Henneberg am 10. 9.1975". Zeitschrift für Tierphysiologie Tierernährung und Futtermittelkunde. 36 (1–6): 1–5. doi:10.1111/j.1439-0396.1975.tb01110.x. ISSN 0044-3565.
- Lenkeit, W. (1957). "Zum Gedenken Wilhelm Hennebergs". Zeitschrift für Tierernährung und Futtermittelkunde. 12 (1–3): 315–328. doi:10.1111/j.1439-0396.1957.tb00284.x. ISSN 0373-0069.

Specific
