= Karl Engler =

German chemist (1842–1925)

Carl Oswald Victor Engler
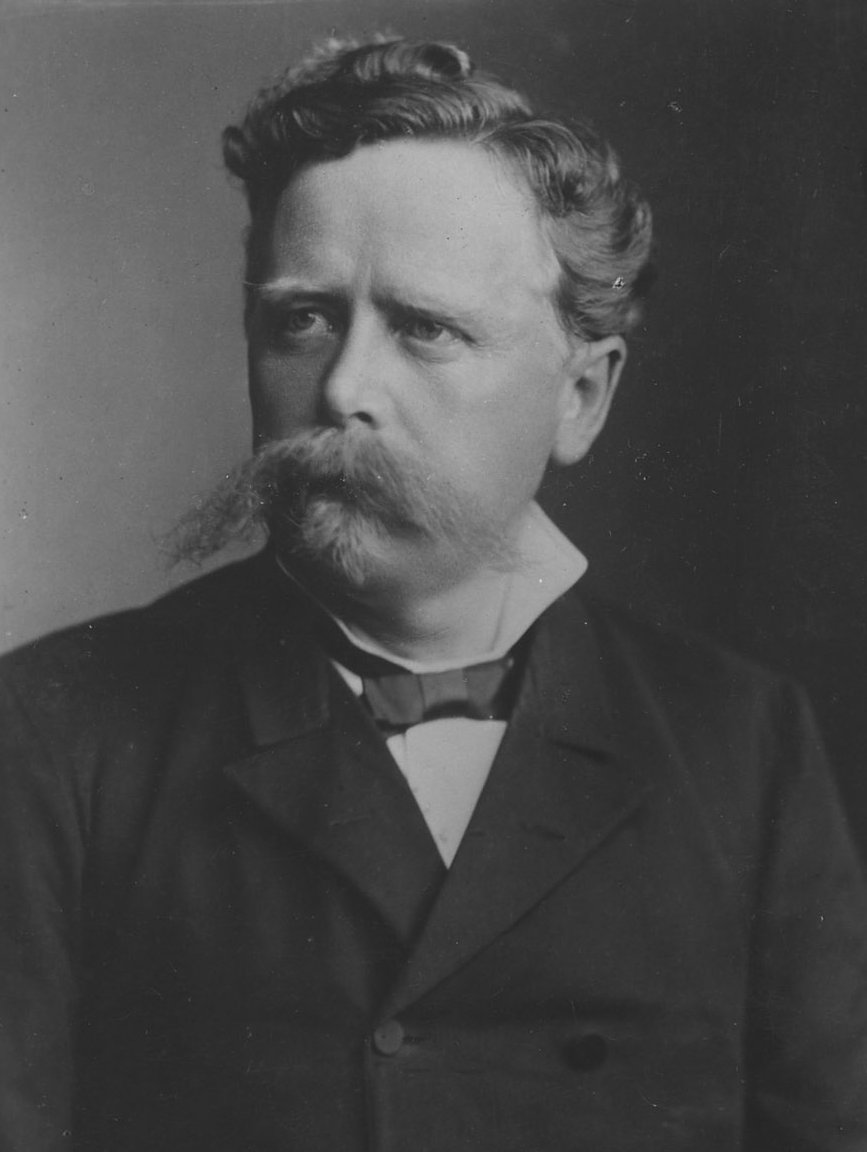
- Born: 5 January 1842; Weisweil, Grand Duchy of Baden
- Died: 7 February 1925 (aged 83); Karlsruhe, Germany
- Occupation: Chemist

Carl Oswald Victor Engler (5 January 1842 – 7 February 1925) was a German chemist, academic and politician. He wrote a Handbook of Industrial Chemistry in 1872. He is remembered for his early work in indigo.

== Biography ==
Engler was the son of a pastor, and he studied Chemistry from 1859 at the Karlsruhe Polytechnic where he became a scientific assistant in 1863. In 1864, he became a Doctor of Philosophy at the University of Freiburg, and he taught there as a private lecturer from 1867 until 1872. In 1872, Engler became extraordinary professor of chemistry at the University of Halle where he published his Handbuch der technischen Chemie ("Handbook of Industrial Chemistry") between 1872 and 1874 (co-author, Leipzig professor Friedrich Stohmann). The two-volume edition was based on Anselme Payen's Précis de chimie industrielle.

In 1876, he became a tenured professor of chemical technology and headmaster of the chemical technical Laboratory at the Karlsruhe Polytechnic (from 1885 the Technical University of Karlsruhe). In 1887, he became a professor of chemistry and director of the Technical University of Karlsruhe. In 1870, he and Adolph Emmerling, a student of Adolf von Baeyer, published a work in which the two first reported the formation of traces of indigo in a material not derived from indigo. Therefore, they have not found indigo “synthesis”, as often reported. Adolf von Baeyer succeeded in this in 1878, who also described in 1883 the correct structural formula. From 1884, he turned to the petrochemistry. He took a study trip in 1885 to the production area in the Caucasus, travelling later to the Middle East (Egypt) and to North America. Engler argued that oil originated in ancient times from animal fat. His later research focused on petroleum. To determine the viscosity, he developed the Engler viscometer. Together with Hans Höfer he published in 1919 the six-volume work "Das Erdöl – Seine Physik, Chemie, Geologie, Technologie und sein Wirtschaftsbetrieb“ in two editions from 1927.

Besides his researches in petroleum he also studied the properties of ozone and from 1903 he was a member in the Board of BASF, where he was involved in the development of the Haber process.

=== Politics ===
Engler was politically active in the National Liberal Party. As a representative he had a seat in the Reichstag from 1887 till 1890 and from 1890 till 1904 in the first Chamber of the Baden Assembly.

== Honors ==
- Honorary doctor at the Friedrich Wilhelm University of Berlin and Technische Universität Darmstadt in 1911
- Honorary doctor at the Ludwig-Maximilians-Universität München in 1918

The Carl-Engler-Medal of the Deutsche Wissenschaftliche Gesellschaft für Erdöl, Erdgas und Kohle e.V. is named after him. The Vocational School for Chemistry professionals in Karlsruhe also bears his name. Also the“ Engler-Bunte Institute“ at Karlsruhe Institute of Technology is named after Engler and Hans Bunte.
