= Wilhelm Keim =

German chemist (1934–2018)

Wilhelm Keim (1 December 1934 – 30 September 2018) was a German chemist and professor of chemistry at the Technical Chemistry and former director of the Institute for Technical and Petrol Chemistry at RWTH Aachen in Germany.

Wilhelm Keim was one of the key figures in the development of the SHOP – process (Shell higher olefin process). SHOP-olefines have a broad range of applications in industrial chemistry, e.g. for the modification of polyethylene as ethylene-alpha-olefine-copolymere, as source for synthetic fatty alcohols or olefine sulfonates.

The first step in Keim's SHOP process is the conversion of ethylene to a mixture of even-numbered α-olefins, which ultimately are converted to surfactants.

He studied chemistry at the Münster and Saarbrücken University. He earned his PhD degree from Max Planck Institute for Coal Research in Mülheim an der Ruhr, having studied under Karl Ziegler. After several years in the chemical industry he became professor at the RWTH Aachen, where he was the director of the Institute for Technical and Petrol chemistry. He retired in 2001.

Keim has received numerous prestigious honours including member of board of the Degussa AG, member of the board of directors of the GDCh (Gesellschaft Deutscher Chemiker) till 1996, chairman of the board of the DGMK Deutsche Wissenschaftliche Gesellschaft für Erdöl, Erdgas und Kohle e.V., honorary professor of the technical university in Dalian (China), honorary professor of the university in Hangzhou (China), adjunct professor Dharan King Fahd University (Saudi Arabia), Dr. Honoris Causa Université Lille Nord de France, Dr. Honoris Causa, member of Academia Europaea, and honorary member of the DECHEMA.

== Publications ==
- Grundlagen der industriellen Chemie : techn. Produkte u. Prozesse / Wilhelm Keim; Arno Behr; Günter Schmitt, ISBN 3-7935-5490-2 (Salle); 3-7941-2553-3 (Sauerländer)
