= Laura E. Marcucci =

Italian physicist

Laura Elisa Marcucci (born 1971) is an Italian physicist, and a professor in theoretical nuclear physics at the University of Pisa. Her research concerns the theory of nuclear reactions of light elements, and especially the reactions involved in astrophysical nucleosynthesis and stellar evolution.

== Education and career ==
Marcucci is originally from Lucca, where she was born in 1971. After a 1995 laurea in physics from the University of Pisa, with honours, she completed a Ph.D. in 2000 through Old Dominion University in the United States. Her doctoral dissertation, Electroweak Structure of Three-and Four-Body Nuclei, was supervised by Rocco Schiavilla, and also involved research at the nearby Jefferson Lab.

She returned to the University of Pisa in 2000 as a postdoctoral researcher. She became a university researcher in 2002, associate professor in 2016, and full professor in 2020. She has also been affiliated with the Istituto Nazionale di Fisica Nucleare since 2000.

== Recognition ==
Marcucci received the 2000 Luise Meyer-Schutzmeister Award of the Association for Women in Science.

She was elected as a Fellow of the American Physical Society (APS) in 2014, after a nomination from the APS Topical Group on Few-Body Systems and Multiparticle Dynamics, "for advancing the understanding of electroweak interactions in nuclei, particularly for precise studies of low-energy radiative and weak capture processes of astrophysical relevance in the few-nucleon systems".
