= Friedrich Leitner =

German economist

Friedrich Leitner (26 January 1874 – 3 July 1945) was a German economist.

He taught at Humbold University Berlin.

Konrad Mellerowicz studied under Leitner, then worked with him, and finally succeeded him in 1938.

== Literary works ==
- Die Selbstkostenberechnung industrieller Betriebe, 1905
- Bilanztechnik und Bilanzkritik, 1911
- Privatwirtschaftslehre der Unternehmung, 1915
  - Wirtschaftslehre der Unternehmung, ^{9}1930
