= Birgit Leitner =

Austrian footballer

Personal information
- Date of birth: February 28, 1981 (age 45)
- Place of birth: Salzburg, Austria
- Height: 1.70 m (5 ft 7 in)
- Position: Goalkeeper

International career
Years	Team	Apps	(Gls)
2005-2009	Austria	27	(0)

Birgit Leitner (born 28 February 1981) is a former Austrian international football player who played Bayern Munich, and also played on the Austrian national team between 2005 and 2009.

== International career ==
Birgit Leitner appeared for the Austrian women's national team 27 times.
