= Friedrich Stohmann =

German agricultural chemist (1832–1897)

Friedrich Karl Adolf Stohmann (25 April 1832 – 1 November 1897) was a German agricultural chemist.

== Biography ==
He was born in Bremen and studied at Göttingen, where he became member of Burschenschaft Hannovera (fraternity), and London. He was Thomas Graham's assistant at University College from 1853 to 1855, and afterwards assisted Wilhelm Henneberg at Celle and at Göttingen-Weende. In 1862 he started the station for agricultural experiments at Braunschweig. He was called to Halle in 1865 as an associate professor, and to the University of Leipzig in 1871, where he was director of the physiological institute of agriculture (1871–97). His principal investigations had to do with the nourishment of animals.

From 1892 he was a member of the Academy of Sciences Leopoldina.

== Works ==
- Beiträge zur Begründung einer rationellen Fütterung der Wiederkäuer (Contributions to the scientific feeding of ruminants, 1860); with Wilhelm Henneberg.
- Biologische Studien (Biological studies, 1873).
- Handbuch der technischen Chemie (Handbook of industrial chemistry, 2 volumes, 1872 and 1874); with Karl Engler.
- Handbuch der Zuckerfabrikation (Handbook of sugar synthesis, 1878).
- Die Stärkefabrikation (Starch synthesis, 1878).
- Encyklopädisches Handbuch der technischen Chemie (Encyclopedic manual of industrial chemistry), 12 volumes, 1888-1922; with Bruno Kerl and others.
