= Leitner Creek =

Stream in Wisconsin, United States

Coordinates: 43°12′56″N 091°05′32″W

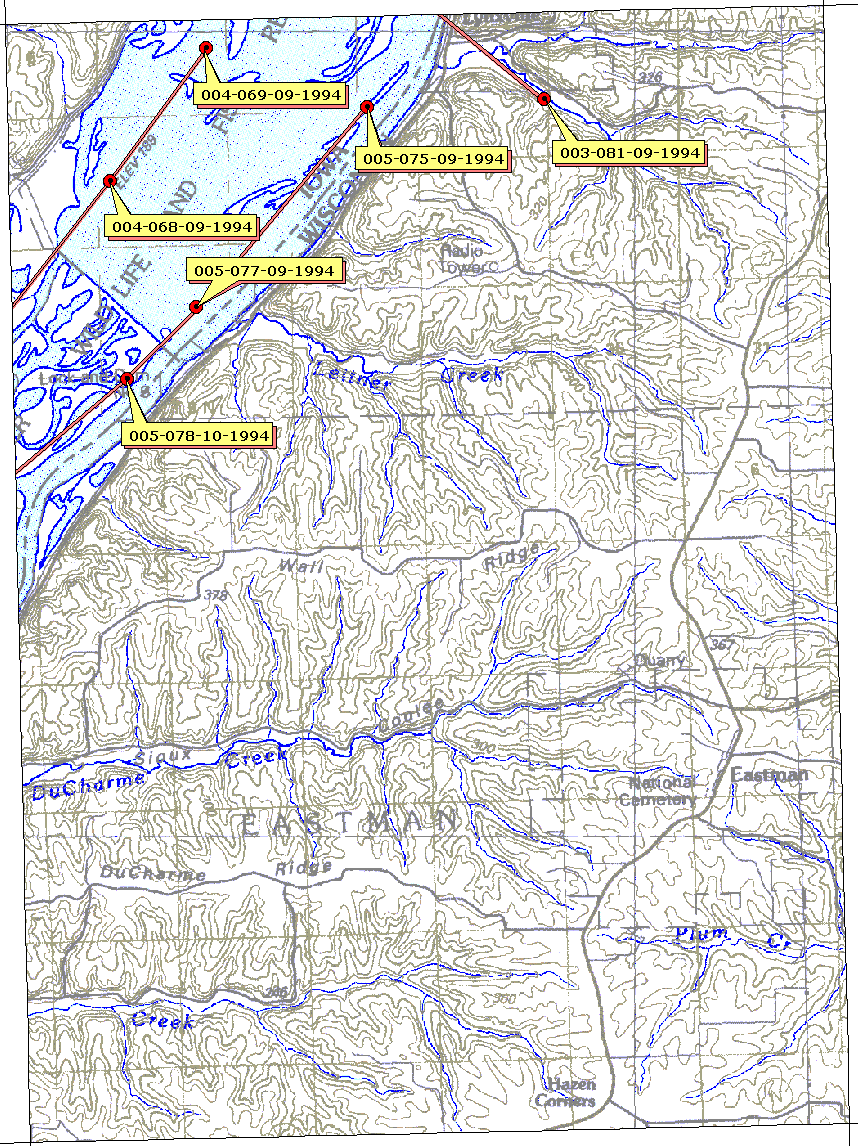
Leitner Creek (USGS)

Leitner Creek is a 4.8-mile-long (7.7 km) tributary of the upper Mississippi River. It rises in the bluffs overlooking the gorge of the Mississippi in east central Crawford County, Wisconsin, north of Prairie du Chien, entering the river just behind Lock and Dam No. 10.

== Sources ==
- U.S. Geological Survey Geographic Names Information System: Leitner Creek
- Environmental Protection Agency
- placenames.com
- List of Wisconsin streams with map links
