= Franz Leitner =

Franz Leitner may refer to:

- Franz Leitner (politician) (1918–2005), Austrian politician
- Franz Leitner (speedway rider) (born 1968), former Austrian motorcycle speedway rider
