= Daniela Leitner =

Austrian-American physicist and nuclear engineer

Daniela Leitner is an Austrian and American physicist and nuclear engineer, the chief engineer and director of the Engineering Division at the Lawrence Berkeley National Laboratory. Her work at the laboratory has focused on the creation and acceleration of beams of ionized heavy nuclei, using electron cyclotron resonance.

== Education and career ==
Leitner has a 1995 Ph.D. from TU Wien in Austria. Her doctoral research was supervised by Hannspeter Winter.

She began working at the Lawrence Berkeley National Laboratory in 1996, as a postdoctoral researcher, with the support of a fellowship from the Austrian government. After the end of her fellowship, she continued at the laboratory as a staff scientist in the Nuclear Science Division. She moved to Michigan State University, in the Facility for Rare Isotope Beams, from 2010 to 2015, returning to the Lawrence Berkeley National Laboratory afterwards, in its Engineering Division. She was named as chief engineer and director of the Engineering Division in 2024.

== Recognition ==
In 2009, Leitner was one of four recipients of the biennial Brightness Award at the International Conference on Ion Sources, for their work on electron cyclotron resonance ion sources.

Leitner was named a Fellow of the American Physical Society (APS) in 2022, after a nomination from the APS Division of the Physics of Beams, "for seminal contributions to a better understanding of ECR sources and pioneering the development of the fully superconducting ECR source VENUS, which remains the ECR community technology standard for high beam intensities".
