= Tarbert =

Place name of Ireland and Scotland

Tarbert (Scottish Gaelic: An Tairbeart) is a place name in Scotland and Ireland. Places named Tarbert are characterised by a narrow strip of land, or isthmus. This can be where two lochs nearly meet, or a causeway out to an island.

== Etymology ==
Pronunciation
Language	Name	Pronunciation
Scots Gaelic	An Tairbeart	[ən̪ˠ ˈt̪ʰaɾʲapərˠʃt̪]
Irish	An Tairbeart	[ənˠ ˈt̪ˠaɾʲəbʲəɾˠt̪ˠ]

All placenames that variously show up as tarbert, tarbat or tarbet in their anglicised form derive from either the Irish or Scottish Gaelic an tairbeart, commonly translated as "the isthmus" today.

Both these words derive from two Old Irish elements, tar "across" and a nominalised form of the verb ber "to carry". The /ɾ/ in tar was assimilated to /ɾʲ/ as a result of being next to the historically palatal /bʲ/ in Old Irish, causing the change in spelling from tar to tair-. So the literal translation would be an "across-carrying". The reason for this is that all tarberts are in fact located at or near old portage sites.

In English language spellings the first syllable "tar" has generally remained constant but the second syllable "bert" has variously been spelled as "bart", "bert" "bat", "bad" etc.

== Examples ==
Places named Tarbert include:

=== Scotland ===
- Tarbert, Gigha, on Gigha
- East Tarbert Bay and West Tarbert Bay on the Isle of Gigha
- Tarbert, Jura, on Jura
- Loch Tarbert, Jura, on the west coast of the island of Jura
- Tarbert, Kintyre the town at the northern end of the Kintyre peninsula, Argyll
- West Loch Tarbert, Argyll in Argyll
- East Loch Tarbert, Argyll also in Argyll
- Tarbet, Argyll also in Argyll, on the bank of Loch Lomond
- Tarbert, Harris, a ferry port in the Western Isles
- West Loch Tarbert, an inlet between North and South Harris
- East Loch Tarbert also by Harris in the Western Isles of Scotland
- Tarbert, on Canna
- Tarbert Bay, on the island of Canna
- Tarbert, on Salen Bay, Highland
- Glen Tarbert, between Loch Linnhe and Loch Sunart
- Tarbert Hill, above the town of West Kilbride
- East Tarbert Bay and West Tarbert Bay on the Mull of Galloway

=== Ireland ===
- Tarbert, County Kerry, a ferry port on the estuary of the River Shannon in County Kerry.
- Tarbert, County Laois, a townland in County Laois

== Canada ==
- Tarbert, Ontario

== See also ==
- Tarbert (disambiguation)
- Tarbet (disambiguation)
- Tarbat
- Loch Torridon, the root of the name having a similar meaning to "tarbert"
- Eday, an Orkney island which has a name derived from the Old Norse eið, which also means "isthmus".
