= Milntown Castle =

Coordinates: 57°44′11″N 4°03′50″W

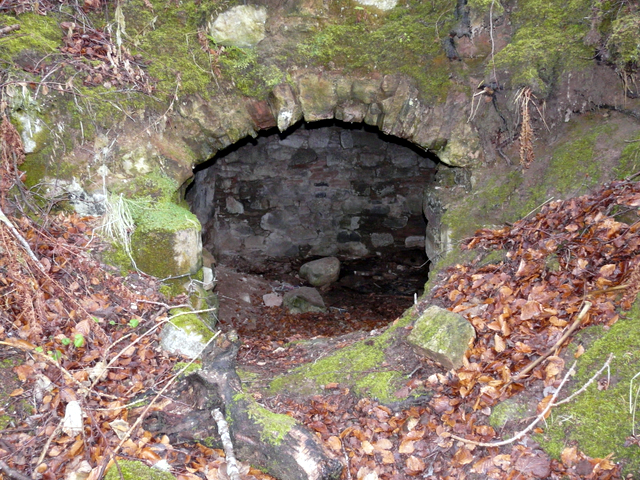
The door of the vault of Milntown Castle, in the grounds of the later Tarbat House, as described by Alexander Mackenzie in 1898: "The only remains of the old castle still extant are the door of the vault and the high terraces"

Milntown Castle was an early 16th-century castle which was situated near Milton, in Easter Ross, in the Scottish Highlands.

== History ==
The castle was built by the Munro of Milntown family, a cadet branch of the Clan Munro. In 1656, the castle and estate were sold to George Mackenzie, 1st Earl of Cromartie also known as George MacKenzie of Tarbet. He renamed the estate New Tarbat after Tarbat Castle (now more commonly known as Ballone Castle), the family's original seat near Portmahomack. Mackenzie had the Milntown Castle pulled down and only part of the basement survives. He then replaced the castle with a new mansion built nearby. When the new mansion was built, the old Milntown Castle was remodelled as part of the garden. That mansion was itself demolished and in 1787 was replaced with a Georgian house (now known as Tarbat House) by his descendant John Mackenzie, Lord MacLeod.

== Accounts of the castle ==
Although the castle no longer exists, descriptions of the building are provided in some books including the History of the Earldom of Sutherland by Sir Robert Gordon (1580–1625) and the History of the Munros of Fowlis written by Alexander Mackenzie in 1898.

Sir Robert Gordon wrote:

About the year 1500 the Munros of Milntown began to build the Castle of Milntown, their next neighbours, the Rosses of Balnagowan, endeavoured to stop them from building the castle, but John, Earl of Sutherland, went himself in person to defend them against Balnagowan's braggings. Then returning home to Sutherland, he did leave a company of men at Milntown for their defence against the Rosses, until most of that castle was finished; which kindness the Monros of Milntown do acknowledge unto this day.

Alexander Mackenzie wrote:

Sir George MacKenzie of Tarbet when he purchased the castle and estate of Milntown, changed the name to Tarbat, after his own title, he being then a Lord of Session under the title of Lord Tarbet. But the peasantry to this day call the place in Gaelic "Balie-Mhuillinn Andrea". The only remains of the old castle still extant are the door of the vault and the high terraces near the place where it stood. In 1728 Viscount Tarbet contracted with masons to "throw down Munro's old work", clear the foundation and build a new house. Some of the oldest inhabitants of the village of Milntown still remember hearing their parents, some of whom assisted in razing Milntown Castle, say, no doubt, with a certain amount of exaggeration, that the hall was so large "that the music fiddles at one end could not be heard at the other". The castle is said to have been the most elegant and highly finished in the North, strikingly adorned with turrets. It stood near the side of the present mansion. In the grounds near the old building were many fine trees. One large beech was called "Queen Mary's tree", supposed to have been planted by that Queen while on a visit to Beauly Priory. It was more than 100 feet high; is said to have required a whole week to cut it down, and to have been so heavy and difficult to remove that it had to be buried where it fell.

== See also ==
- Castles in Scotland
