= Loch Tarbert =

Loch Tarbert may refer to:

== Sea lochs in Scotland ==
- Loch Tarbert, Jura
- East Loch Tarbert, on Harris
- West Loch Tarbert, on Harris
- East Loch Tarbert, Argyll
- West Loch Tarbert, Argyll

== Other ==
- MV Loch Tarbert, a ferry operated by Caledonian MacBrayne
