= An Tairbeart =

An Tairbeart (Scottish Gaelic, 'crossing' or 'isthmus') may refer to the following places in Scotland:

- several places called Tarbet
- several places called Tarbert
- Tarbat, a civil parish in the east of Ross and Cromarty, Scotland
