= Tarbert (disambiguation) =

Tarbert a place name in Scotland and Ireland.

Tarbert may refer to the following places:

== Settlements ==
- Tarbert, Isle of Gigha, Scotland
- Tarbert, Canna, Scotland
- Tarbert, Harris, a ferry port on Harris, Scotland
- Tarbert, Jura, on the east coast of the island of Jura
- Tarbert, County Kerry, a ferry port on the estuary of the River Shannon in County Kerry, Ireland
- Tarbert, Kintyre the town at the northern end of the Kintyre peninsula, Argyll and Bute, Scotland
- Tarbert, Ontario, Canada

== Sea lochs ==
- West Loch Tarbert by Harris in the Western Isles of Scotland
- East Loch Tarbert by Harris in the Western Isles of Scotland
- West Loch Tarbert, Argyll by Tarbert in Argyll, Scotland
- East Loch Tarbert, Argyll by Tarbert in Argyll, Scotland
- Loch Tarbert, Jura by Tarbert on the island of Jura

== Other uses ==
- Tarbert (Parliament of Scotland constituency)

== See also ==
- Tarbet (disambiguation)
- Tarbat
