= Tarbet =

Tarbet (Scottish Gaelic: An Tairbeart ) may refer the following places in Scotland:

- Tarbet, Argyll, a village on the side of Loch Lomond
- Tarbet, Loch Nevis, a hamlet in Lochaber, near Mallaig
- Tarbet, Sutherland, a hamlet on the north-west coast, near the island of Handa
- Castle Tarbet, on the island of Fidra in the Firth of Forth
- Tarbet Isle, in Loch Lomond

== See also ==
- Tarbert (disambiguation)
- Tarbat, a civil parish in the east of Ross and Cromarty, Scotland
- Tarbert, a place name in Scotland and Ireland
