= List of shipwrecks in July 1846 =

The list of shipwrecks in July 1846 includes ships sunk, foundered, wrecked, grounded, or otherwise lost during July 1846.

== 1 July ==
List of shipwrecks: 1 July 1846
Ship	State	Description
Arion	United Kingdom	The ship ran aground off Langness, Isle of Man. She was on a voyage from Dublin to Workington, Cumberland. She was refloated and assisted in to Castletown, Isle of Man by the Castletown Lifeboat.
Carl Alexander	(Russian Empire) Grand Duchy of Finland	The ship was wrecked on the east coast of Gotland, Sweden. Her crew were rescued. She was on a voyage from Lübeck to Pori.
Correo de Teneriffe	Spain	The ship ran aground on the West Bank. She put in to Ramsgate, Kent, United Kingdom in a leaky condition.
Harriet	United Kingdom	The pilot boat, a sloop, was run down and sunk off Pendennis Castle, Cornwall by Hortensia (United Kingdom). Her crew were rescued by Hortensia.

== 2 July ==
List of shipwrecks: 2 July 1846
Ship	State	Description
Petworth	United Kingdom	The ship was driven ashore and wrecked at Lydd, Kent. Her crew were rescued.
William Abrams	United States	The East Indiaman was driven ashore and wrecked on the Black Ledge, off Seal Island. Her 30 crew were rescued. She was on a voyage from Boston, Massachusetts, United States to Calcutta, India.

== 3 July ==
List of shipwrecks: 3 July 1846
Ship	State	Description
British Queen	United Kingdom	The paddle steamer struck a sunken rock off Rosneath, Argyllshire and was holed. She was beached at Helensburgh for temporary repairs. She was taken in to Greenock, Renfrewshire.
Countess of London	United Kingdom	The ship was wrecked at "Alquay" with the loss of three of her crew.
Evening Star	United Kingdom	The ship was driven ashore at Richibucto, New Brunswick, British North America with the loss of four of her crew. She was consequently condemned.
Llama	United Kingdom	The ship was lost off "Papoe" with the loss of her captain. She was on a voyage from Benin City, Kingdom of Dahomey to London.
Ockbrook	United Kingdom	The ship was driven ashore at Richibucto. She was consequently condemned.
Pera	Flag unknown	The ship was driven ashore at "Setil Bahar", Ottoman Empire. She was refloated.

== 4 July ==
List of shipwrecks: 4 July 1846
Ship	State	Description
Ceres	United Kingdom	The ship ran aground on Skagen, Denmark. She was on a voyage from Ventava, Courland Governorate to Great Yarmouth. She was refloated.
Lady Willoughby	United Kingdom	The ship was driven ashore at Port Talbot, Glamorgan. She was on a voyage from Port Talbot to Amlwch, Anglesey. She was refloated and put back to Port Talbot.
Seine	French Navy	The corvette ran aground and was wrecked at Balade, New Caledonia. Her crew, nearly 200 people, survived.

== 5 July ==
List of shipwrecks: 5 July 1846
Ship	State	Description
Blessing	United Kingdom	The ship was driven ashore and wrecked at Boulogne, Pas-de-Calais, France. She was on a voyage from Newcastle upon Tyne, Northumberland to Étaples, Pas-de-Calais.
Cuba	United Kingdom	The ship was driven ashore south of Ventava, Courland Governorate. She was on a voyage from King's Lynn, Norfolk to Riga, Russia.
Faith	United Kingdom	The schooner foundered in the English Channel off the coast of Seine-Inférieure, France with the loss of all on board. She was on a voyage from Goole, Yorkshire to Le Tréport, Seine-Inférieure.
Levant	(France) Mauritius	The ship was wrecked on a reef off Cosmoledo, Seychelles with the loss of three of the 31 people on board. The survivors were rescued on 2 November by HMS Snake (Royal Navy).
Victory	United Kingdom	The steamship ran aground off Halse, Bornholm, Denmark. . Her passengers were taken off. She was on a voyage from London to Saint Petersburg, Russia. Victory was refloated on 8 July and resumed her voyage.

== 6 July ==
List of shipwrecks: 6 July 1846
Ship	State	Description
Levant	United States	The ship was driven ashore on the Cherry Island Flats, near Chester, Pennsylvania.

== 7 July ==
List of shipwrecks: 7 July 1846
Ship	State	Description
Brenda	United Kingdom	The ship ran aground near "Peree", Province of Canada, British North America. She was on a voyage from Donegal to Quebec City, Province of Canada. She was refloated on 10 July and completed her voyage.
Montague	United Kingdom	The ship was driven ashore at Boulogne, Pas-de-Calais, France. She was on a voyage from Poole, Dorset to Hamburg. She was refloated the next day and taken in to Boulogne.

== 8 July ==
List of shipwrecks: 8 July 1846
Ship	State	Description
Germania	Stralsund	The schooner foundered off "Kuhlen" with the loss of all hands. She was on a voyage from Wolgast to an English port.
James Wearne	United Kingdom	The ship was driven ashore in the Dardanelles. She was on a voyage from Ibraila, Ottoman Empire to St. Ives, Cornwall. She was refloated and resumed her voyage.
Nordstjern	Norway	The ship foundered off Langesund. Her crew were rescued. She was on a voyage from Skien to "Staben".

== 9 July ==
List of shipwrecks: 9 July 1846
Ship	State	Description
Borneo	United Kingdom	The ship was lost in the Strait of Belle Isle. Her crew were rescued. She was on a voyage from Quebec City, Province of Canada, British North America to Limerick.
Margaret	(United Kingdom of Great Britain and Ireland) New Zealand	The schooner was lost in the South Taranaki Bight, en route from Kapiti Island to New Plymouth. She left Kapiti during a gale, which intensified to near hurricane strength within a few hours of her leaving port. No sign was ever found of her.
Victoria	(United Kingdom of Great Britain and Ireland) South Australia	The ship was wrecked off Cape Jaffa. with the loss of two of her crew She was on a voyage from Adelaide to Rivoli Bay.

== 10 July ==
List of shipwrecks: 10 July 1846
Ship	State	Description
James and Ann	United Kingdom	The ship ran aground on the Lemon and Ower Sand, in the North Sea off the coast of Essex. She was on a voyage from Riga, Russia to Portsmouth, Hampshire. She was refloated and taken in to Great Yarmouth, Norfolk.

== 11 July ==
List of shipwrecks: 11 July 1846
Ship	State	Description
Amelia	(United Kingdom of Great Britain and Ireland) New Zealand	The schooner was wrecked in Worser's Bay.
Jessy Macleod	United Kingdom	The ship was driven ashore at the mouth of the Marowa River, Russia with the loss of all but five of her crew.
Melona	United Kingdom	The ship ran aground of the Felsand, in the Baltic Sea. She was on a voyage from Newcastle upon Tyne, Northumberland to Saint Petersburg, Russia. She was refloated and taken in to Saint Petersburg.

== 12 July ==
List of shipwrecks: 12 July 1846
Ship	State	Description
Eweretta	United Kingdom	The barque sank in London Docks. All three people on board survived. She had collided with a collier in the River Thames the previous day and had been damaged by her anchor. Eweretta was on a voyage from Sydney, New South Wales to London.

== 13 July ==
List of shipwrecks: 13 July 1846
Ship	State	Description
Fisherman	(United Kingdom of Great Britain and Ireland) New Zealand	The ship was driven ashore and damaged at Wellington.
Jessamine	United Kingdom	The brig collided with Belle Creole (United Kingdom) and foundered. Her crew were rescued by Belle Creole. Jessamine was on a voyage from Galați, Ottoman Empire to Falmouth, Cornwall.

== 14 July ==
List of shipwrecks: 14 July 1846
Ship	State	Description
Betsy	(United Kingdom of Great Britain and Ireland) Saint Vincent	The drogher, a schooner, was wrecked on Saint Vincent.
Maiden City	United Kingdom	The paddle steamer was driven ashore and wrecked in East Loch Tarbert. All on board were rescued. She was on a voyage from Liverpool, Lancashire to Londonderry.
Marcella	United Kingdom	The ship was destroyed by fire at Saint John's, Newfoundland.

== 15 July ==
List of shipwrecks: 15 July 1846
Ship	State	Description
Millman	United Kingdom	The ship ran aground on the Settle Burba Bank, in Liverpool Bay. She was on a voyage from Liverpool, Lancashire to Alexandria, Egypt. She was refloated and resumed her voyage.
San Joao Baptiste	Portugal	The ship was wrecked near Cayenne, French Guiana with the loss of 23 of the 30 people on board. She was on a voyage from Pará, Brazil to Lisbon.

== 16 July ==
List of shipwrecks: 16 July 1846
Ship	State	Description
Active	United Kingdom	The ship was wrecked off "Neibram", India with the loss of five of her crew.
Alvarado	United States	The ship was abandoned in the Atlantic Ocean (51°33′N 9°15′W). Her crew took to three boats.
Mark Palmer	United Kingdom	The barque was wrecked on Western Head, Nova Scotia, British North America. Her crew were rescued. She was on a voyage from Montreal, Province of Canada to Cork.

== 17 July ==
List of shipwrecks: 17 July 1846
Ship	State	Description
Dundee Merchant	(United Kingdom of Great Britain and Ireland) Van Diemen's Land	The whaler, a schooner, was wrecked on a reef 120 nautical miles (220 km) north west of New Caledonia. Her crew survived. She was on a voyage from Hobart to the South China Sea.
Elizabeth	Hamburg	The ship was driven ashore on Juist, Kingdom of Hanover. She was on a voyage from Great Yarmouth, Norfolk, United Kingdom to Blankenese. She was refloated on 20 July and taken in to Norden.
Erin	United Kingdom	The ship was destroyed by fire off the "Bay of Seven Islands". Her crew were rescued. She was on a voyage from Liverpool, Lancashire to Quebec City, Province of Canada, British North America.
Warsaw	United Kingdom	The ship was wrecked near Rio Grande, Minas Gerais, Brazil. All on board were rescued. She was on a voyage from Montevideo, Uruguay to Rio Grande.

== 18 July ==
List of shipwrecks: 18 July 1846
Ship	State	Description
Clorinde	France	The chasse-marée ran aground on the Newcombe Sand. She was on a voyage from Nantes, Loire-Inférieure to Abbeville, Somme. She was refloated and taken in to Dover, Kent, United Kingdom.
Daniel	United Kingdom	The ship sank in Carnarvon Bay off Portmadoc, Caernarfonshire. Her crew were rescued.
Gee	United Kingdom	The ship was driven ashore on Stoneskar, Russia. She was on a voyage from Hull, Yorkshire to Saint Petersburg, Russia. She was refloated on 20 July and taken in to Saint Petersburg.
Martha	United Kingdom	The schooner was driven ashore at Lytham St Annes, Lancashire. She was on a voyage from Dundalk, County Louth to Lytham St Annes.

== 19 July ==
List of shipwrecks: 19 July 1846
Ship	State	Description
Clorinde	France	The chasse-marée was driven ashore. She was on a voyage from Nantes, Loire-Inférieure to Abbeville, Somme. She was refloated and taken in to Dover, Kent, United Kingdom.
Justin	(United Kingdom of Great Britain and Ireland) British North America	The ship was lost near Pictou, Nova Scotia. She was on a voyage from Saint John's, Newfoundland to Pictou.
Vulcan	United Kingdom	The ship was severely damaged at Valparaíso, Chile.

== 20 July ==
List of shipwrecks: 20 July 1846
Ship	State	Description
Casimir Perrier	France	The ship was wrecked in the Gambia River near Albreda, Gambia Colony and Protectorate. She was on a voyage from Havre de Grâce, Seine-Inférieure to Saint-Louis, Senegal.
Helen	United Kingdom	The ship was wrecked on the Banjaard Sand, in the North Sea off the coast of Zeeland, Netherlands. Her crew were rescued. She was on a voyage from Liverpool, Lancashire to Dordrecht, South Holland, Netherlands.
United Kingdom	United Kingdom	The ship was driven ashore at Whitehead, Nova Scotia, British North America. She was on a voyage from New York to Quebec City, Province of Canada, British North America. She was refloated on 24 July and taken into Whitehead, where she ran aground. She was consequently condemned.

== 21 July ==
List of shipwrecks: 21 July 1846
Ship	State	Description
Ann	United Kingdom	The sloop departed from Newcastle upon Tyne, Northumberland for Arbroath, Forfarshire. Presumed subsequently foundered in the North Sea with the loss of all hands; a boat from Ann was discovered 12 nautical miles (22 km) off Berwick upon Tweed, Northumberland by the fishing smack Helen (United Kingdom).
Duke of Lancaster	United Kingdom	The ship was wrecked off the Lamock Island, China. Her crew were rescued by Nymph and Warlock (both United Kingdom).
Fidelity	United Kingdom	The ship was driven ashore and wrecked at St Ann's Head, Pembrokeshire. She was on a voyage from Fishguard to Milford Haven.

== 22 July ==
List of shipwrecks: 22 July 1846
Ship	State	Description
Breeze	(United Kingdom of Great Britain and Ireland) South Australia	The whaler was lost at Tahiti. Her crew were rescued.
Eliza Ann	United Kingdom	The ship was driven ashore and wrecked at Maryport, Cumberland. Her crew were rescued. She was on a voyage from Quebec City, Province of Canada, British North America to Carlisle, Cumberland.
James Augustus	United Kingdom	The ship was driven ashore on "Tencurn Island", Pennsylvania, United States.
Martha	United Kingdom	The ship was driven ashore at Lytham St Annes, Lancashire.
Ninus	United Kingdom	The ship ran aground on the Cork Sand, in the North Sea off the coast of Suffolk. She was on a voyage from Scarborough, Yorkshire to London. She was refloated and resumed her voyage.
Olive Branch	United Kingdom	The ship was driven ashore on Reedy Island, Pennsylvania. she was on a voyage from Windsor, Nova Scotia, British North America to Philadelphia, Pennsylvania.

== 23 July ==
List of shipwrecks: 23 July 1846
Ship	State	Description
Breeze	(United Kingdom of Great Britain and Ireland) Van Diemen's Land	The ship was wrecked at Upolu, Samoa. All on board survived. She was on a voyage from a port in New Zealand to Tahiti.
Britannia	United Kingdom	The ship was run aground in the Tusket Islands, Nova Scotia, British North America. She was on a voyage from Londonderry, Nova Scotia to an Irish port. She was refloated and resumed her voyage.
Eliza and Ann	United Kingdom	The barque was wrecked on the Robin Rigg Sandbank, in the Solway Firth. Her crew were rescued. She was on a voyage from Quebec City, Province of Canada, British North America to Port Carlisle, Cumberland. The wreck came ashore at Dumfries on 24 July.
Jessie	United Kingdom	The ship was driven ashore and damaged at Rockfield, Ross-shire. She was refloated on 28 July and taken in to Fraserburgh, Aberdeenshire for repairs.
Rowena	United Kingdom	The ship was driven ashore at Mizen Head, County Cork. She was refloated but was abandoned by her crew. Rowena was on a voyage from Liverpool, Lancashire to Constantinople, Ottoman Empire. She was subsequently taken in tow by the Wicklow pilot boats and arrived at Dublin on 24 July.
Tory	United Kingdom	The ship was driven ashore between Deal and Walmer Castle, Kent. She was on a voyage from London to Madras, India. She was refloated.

== 24 July ==
List of shipwrecks: 24 July 1846
Ship	State	Description
Andrews	United Kingdom	The ship foundered in the North Sea. Her crew were rescued by Four Sisters (Denmark). She was on a voyage from Sunderland, County Durham to Hamburg.
Campbells	United Kingdom	The ship was wrecked at Richibucto, New Brunswick, British North America. She was on a voyage from Richibucto to London.
Folgh-a-Ballagh	United Kingdom	The schooner foundered off "Telsta Head", Isle of Lewis, Outer Hebrides. Her crew survived. She was on a voyage from Newcastle upon Tyne, Northumberland to Liverpool, Lancashire.
Friendship	United Kingdom	The ship was driven ashore on the coast of Devon. She was on a voyage from Bideford, Devon to Quebec City, Province of Canada, British North America. She was refloated and put back to Bideford.
George	United Kingdom	The smack collided with the schooner Fairy (United Kingdom) and foundered off the Kentish Knock. Her crew were rescued by Fairy.
Triton	United Kingdom	The ship was wrecked on the Skagen Reef. She was on a voyage from Riga, Russia to Hull, Yorkshire.

== 25 July ==
List of shipwrecks: 25 July 1846
Ship	State	Description
Agenoria	United Kingdom	The ship was abandoned in the Atlantic Ocean. Her crew were rescued by Numa (United Kingdom). Agenoria was on a voyage from Quebec City, Province of Canada, British North America to Sunderland, County Durham.
Maria	Stettin	The ship was driven ashore at Zingst, Prussia. She was on a voyage from Leith, Lothian, United Kingdom to Stettin. She was refloated on 3 August and taken in to Stralsund.

== 26 July ==
List of shipwrecks: 26 July 1846
Ship	State	Description
Eugo	United Kingdom	The ship was driven ashore. She was on a voyage from Newcastle upon Tyne, Northumberland to Rouen, Seine-Inférieure, France. She was refloated and taken in to Dover, Kent.
Jehu	Sweden	The schooner was wrecked at Allinge, Denmark. Her crew were rescued.
Mary Key	United Kingdom	The ship ran aground on the Herd Sand, in the North Sea off the coast of County Durham. She was on a voyage from South Shields, County Durham to Arbroath, Forfarshire. She was refloated the next day and resumed her voyage.
Melea	United Kingdom	The ship was driven ashore on "Neroe", Denmark. She was on a voyage from Memel, Prussia to Dundee, Forfarshire. She was refloated the next day and taken in to Christiansø, Denmark.

== 27 July ==
List of shipwrecks: 27 July 1846
Ship	State	Description
Frederick Young	United Kingdom	The ship ran aground at South Shields, County Durham. She was on a voyage from Quebec City, Province of Canada, British North America to South Shields.
P. Dean	United Kingdom	The ship ran aground in the Pará River, She was on a voyage from Liverpool, Lancashire to Para, Brazil. She was refloated.
Prince Regent	United Kingdom	The ship was driven ashore in Whitsand Bay. She was on a voyage from Quebec City to Plymouth, Devon.
St. Mark	United Kingdom	The ship was wrecked on the Carysfort Reef. Her passengers were rescued by the schooner Mary Ellen (United States). St. Mark was on a voyage from Mobile, Alabama, United States to Liverpool, Lancashire.

== 28 July ==
List of shipwrecks: 28 July 1846
Ship	State	Description
Benledi	United Kingdom	The paddle steamer struck a sunken rock near Elie, Fife and was wrecked. She was on a voyage from Elie to Largo, Fife.
Chevalier	United Kingdom	The ship was wrecked on Sand Island. She was on a voyage from Mobile, Alabama, United States to Liverpool, Lancashire.
Euphemia	United Kingdom	The brig ran aground on the Drumroof Bank, in the Solway Firth and sank. Her crew were rescued. She was on a voyage from Cardiff, Glamorgan to Kronstadt, Russia.
Lady Combermere	United Kingdom	The ship ran aground on the Burbo Bank, in Liverpool Bay and was severely damaged. She was on a voyage from Liverpool to Riga, Russia. She was refloated and put back to Liverpool.
Margaret	United Kingdom	The ship was driven ashore and wrecked on Little Gull Island, New York. She was on a voyage from Windsor, Nova Scotia, British North America to New York City.
Mary Ann	(United Kingdom of Great Britain and Ireland) British North America	The ship was lost at Cape Ray, Newfoundland.
Ocean Queen	United Kingdom	The ship was wrecked on Grand Cayman.

== 29 July ==
List of shipwrecks: 29 July 1846
Ship	State	Description
Elizabeth and Mary	United Kingdom	The ship was driven ashore between "Nazel Island" and "Mevin", Russia. Her crew were rescued. She was on a voyage from Stockton on Tees, County Durham to Arkhangelsk, Russia.
Jane	United Kingdom	The ship was driven ashore at Youghal, County Cork.
Mayflower	United States	The ship was driven ashore on Tangier Island, Virginia. She was on a voyage from Boston, Massachusetts to Pictou, Nova Scotia, British North America. She was refloated and taken in to Tangier, Virginia.

== 30 July ==
List of shipwrecks: 30 July 1846
Ship	State	Description
Atalanta	United Kingdom	The ship was driven ashore at Syra, Greece. She was on a voyage from Liverpool, Lancashire to Syra and Salonica, Greece. She was refloated and taken in to Syra in a leaky condition.
Egbert	United Kingdom	The brig was driven ashore at North Cape, Prince Edward Island, British North America. She was on a voyage from Shediac, Nova Scotia, British North America to London.
Elizabeth	United Kingdom	The ship was driven ashore on the west coast of Prince Edward Island. She was on a voyage from Richibucto, New Brunswick, British North America to Porthcawl, Glamorgan. She was consequently condemned.
Howard	United Kingdom	The ship was wrecked off Nags Head, North Carolina, United States. Her crew were rescued. She was on a voyage from Liverpool, Lancashire to Savannah, Georgia, United States.
Mary Key	United Kingdom	The ship ran aground on the Herd Sand, in the North Sea off the coast of County Durham. She was on a voyage from South Shields, County Durham to Arbroath, Forfarshire.
President Washington	United States	The schooner ran aground on the Burial Rocks, off the coast of Massachusetts. She was refloated but capsized and sank.
Rowland Hill	(United Kingdom of Great Britain and Ireland) British North America	The steamship was in collision with the steamship Quebec ( (United Kingdom of Great Britain and Ireland) ) and sank in the Saint Lawrence River. Two lives were lost.
Three Sisters	United Kingdom	The ship ran aground on the Foilskirt Rock. She was on a voyage from Cardiff, Glamorgan to Waterford. She was refloated on 1 August and taken in to Waterford.
Trial	United Kingdom	The ship struck a sunken wreck on the Long Sand, in the North Sea off the coast of Essex and was damaged. She was on a voyage from London to Penzance, Cornwall. She was refloated and taken in to Margate, Kent in a leaky condition.

== 31 July ==
List of shipwrecks: 31 July 1846
Ship	State	Description
Frederick Young	United Kingdom	The ship ran aground on the Herd Sand, in the North Sea off the coast of County Durham. She was on a voyage from Quebec City, Province of Canada, British North America to South Shields, County Durham.
Galatea	United Kingdom	The ship capsized in the Wicklow Roads.
Glen Albyn	United Kingdom	The steamship was severely damaged by fire at Hull, Yorkshire.
Scotsman	United Kingdom	The ship was driven ashore near Whitburn, County Durham.

== Unknown date ==
List of shipwrecks: Unknown date in July 1846
Ship	State	Description
Duke of Portland	United Kingdom	The ship foundered in the English Channel off the Glénan Islands, Finistère, France before 15 July.
Lady Campbell	United Kingdom	The ship was driven ashore on Green Island, British North America before 27 July. She was on a voyage from Waterford to Quebec City, Province of Canada, British North America. She was refloated and towed in to Quebec City.
Lady Peel	United Kingdom	The ship was driven ashore and damaged on Basque Island, British North America before 29 July. She was on a voyage from London to Quebec City, Province of Canada, British North America. She was refloated and towed in to Quebec City.
Pusseyhall	United Kingdom	The ship was wrecked.
Wilhelmine	Denmark	The schooner was wrecked at Orebak, Iceland before 14 July.
