= Tarbat House =

Building in Highland, Scotland

Coordinates: 57.7354°N 4.0677°W

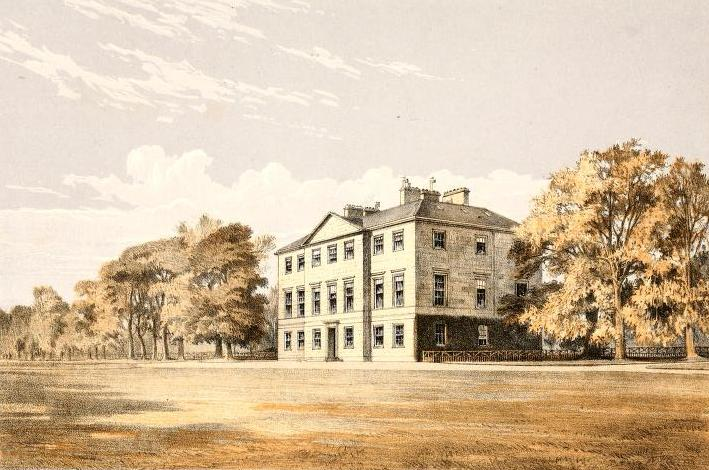
Tarbat House in an illustration published in 1876

Tarbat House is a Category A listed building in the Highland council area of northern Scotland. A three-story stone mansion in the neoclassical style, it was built in 1787 by the Edinburgh architect James McLeran for John Mackenzie, Lord MacLeod. The house is located approximately 500m from the village of Milton near Invergordon.

== History ==
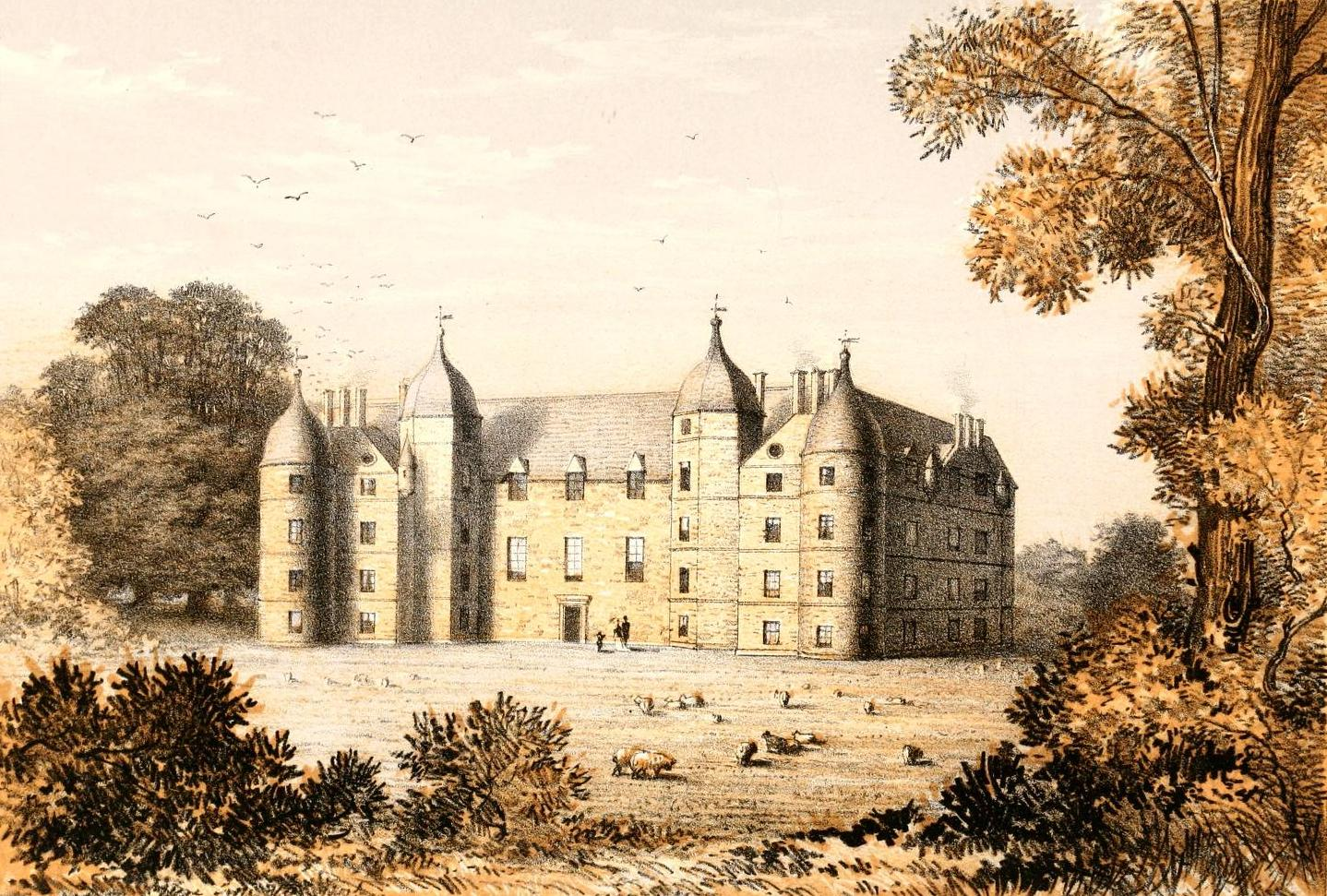
George Mackenzie's mansion which previously occupied the site

Tarbat House was erected on the site of a previous mansion which had been built for George Mackenzie, 1st Earl of Cromartie in the late 17th century on the grounds of the demolished Milntown Castle. When George Mackenzie had bought the Milntown estate in 1656, he renamed it New Tarbat after Tarbat Castle, the family's original seat in Tarbat. Some of the remains of George Mackenzie's mansion were incorporated into the new one. Concurrent with the construction of the new house, Lord MacLeod planted thousands of new forest and fir trees on the estate. Some of the final building work on the house was unfinished when he died in 1789 after a year-long illness. The remaining work was completed to his plans by his cousin and successor, Kenneth Mackenzie.

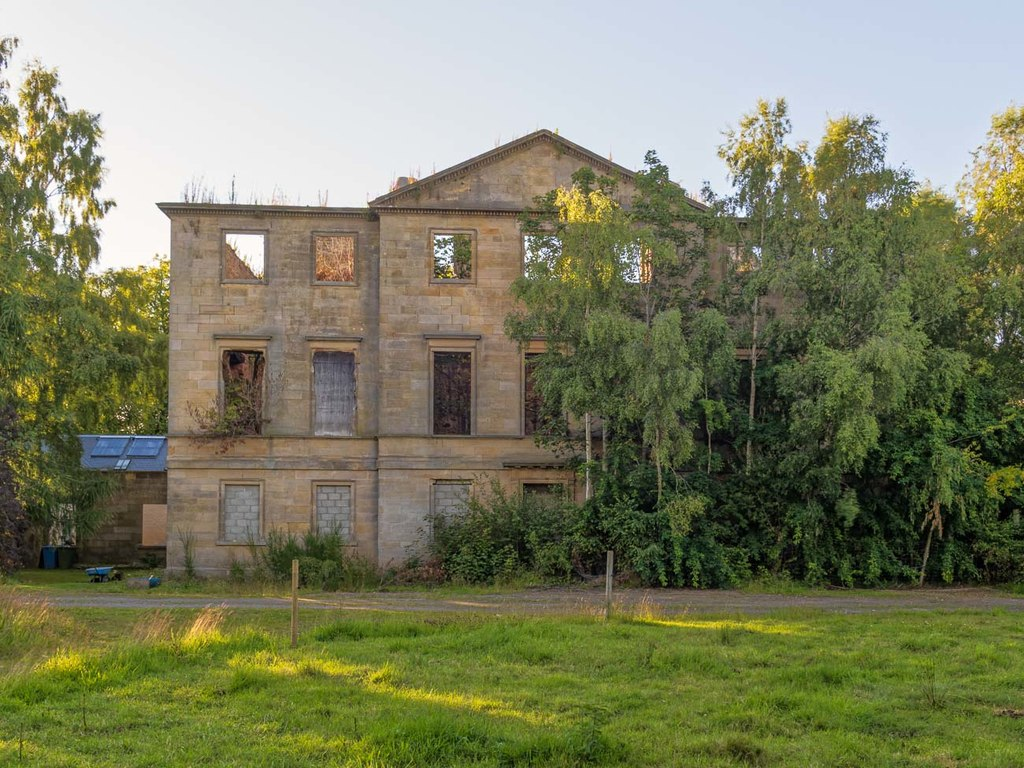
Tarbat House in 2017

Sir George Steuart MacKenzie described the house in 1810:

Tarbat House is quite plain outside. Within are some handsome rooms. A great deal of space has been taken up by the architect having indulged himself in displaying wide landing spaces, and a spacious staircase. These are extremely pleasant during the summer months but are hardly suited to our long and dreary winters. The rooms are elegantly proportioned, and there is a fine view of Cromarty from the windows of the principal rooms.

Tarbat House remained in the ownership of the MacKenzie family until the death of Sibell Lilian MacKenzie in 1962. It was placed on the "Buildings at risk" register of the Royal Commission on the Ancient and Historical Monuments of Scotland in 1963 and added to the register of Category A listed buildings in 1971. An arson attack in 1987 badly damaged the building, destroying the roof entirely, and while the east wing has now been restored, much of the rest of the house remains in a state of disrepair. As of 2014, Tarbat House and the reduced Tarbat Estate were in private ownership.
