= Torbert =

Torbert may refer to:

== People ==
=== Surname ===
- Alfred Thomas Archimedes Torbert (1833–1880), American general and diplomat
- Beth Torbert (born 1971), Canadian singer known by her stage name Bif Naked
- C. C. Torbert Jr. (1929–2018), American jurist
- Dave Torbert (1948–1982), American musician
- Horace G. Torbert Jr. (1911–2008), American diplomat
- Jason Torbert (born 1975), American musician
- Kelvin Torbert (born 1983), American former basketball player
- Ronald Torbert, American football official

=== Given name ===
- Torbert Macdonald (1917–1976), American politician

== Other uses ==
- Torbert (mango), a mango cultivar
- Torbert, Louisiana
- Mount Torbert, Alaska
- Torbert Escarpment, Antarctica

== See also ==
- Pierre Toubert (1932–2025), French historian
- Tarbert (disambiguation)
