= Milton, Easter Ross =

Coordinates: 57.74179°N 4.07582°W

Milton: Scottish Gaelic: Baile Mhuilinn Anndra
- Location within the Ross and Cromarty area
- Population: 640 (2020)
- OS grid reference: NH765257
- Council area: Highland
- Country: Scotland
- Sovereign state: United Kingdom
- Post town: Tain
- Postcode district: IV18
- Police: Scotland
- Fire: Scottish
- Ambulance: Scottish

Milton (Scottish Gaelic: Baile Mhuilinn Anndra), known as Milntown of Tarbat until the early 1970s, is a small Easter Ross community between Kildary and Barbaraville on Scotland's North East coast.

== History ==
=== The Scottish clans ===
It was a centre for oatmeal and later flax production, fed by the many surrounding farms during the heyday of the Clan Ross. According to historian R. W Munro the family that did most to extend the territory of the Clan Munro was the senior line of the numerous descendants of John, brother of George Munro, 10th Baron of Foulis. The Munro of Milntown family's base, Milntown Castle, was at Milntown of Meddat which was so near to Balnagown Castle that the Ross chiefs tried to stop them building there. The last of in the senior line of the Munros of Milntown was killed at the Battle of Kilsyth in 1642 and Milntown Castle was burned down by carelessness in the same year. The castle was demolished to make way for the Mackenzie purchaser's improvements; the original Tarbat House.

=== 18th to 19th centuries ===
The village of Milntown's merkat cross dates from the late 18th century. The mill was powered by a feed from the Balnagown River.

The original village, a conservation area, features classic Scottish Vernacular architectural features, and a short distance away the Tarbat Estate includes Major-General Lord MacLeod's 1787 Georgian Tarbat House, now in a state of ruin but with many original features within the grounds, including the burial sites of favourite horses and dogs and an impressive, although now uncared for Victorian arboretum. The view from the top floors of the mansion in its early days before the encroachment of trees would have taken in the grounds and the Cromarty Firth.

=== Modern history ===
Today it has a modern council housing development to the west and north of the original village, built during the early and late 1970s on what was arable land for many centuries.
