= Tarbat Ness =

Coordinates: 57°51′59″N 3°46′27″W

Tarbat Ness (Scottish Gaelic: Rubha Thairbeirt) is a headland that lies at the end of the Tarbat peninsula in Easter Ross, Scotland. The name is from the Gaelic tairbeart meaning "isthmus" and the Old Norse ness, meaning "headland". It lies to the south of the entrance to the Dornoch Firth.

== Geology and geomorphology ==
The Upper Old Red Sandstone Devonian period bedrock contains fish fossils. There are examples of a range of pitting, saltspray and honeycomb erosion and "some of the best examples of differential erosion processes on tilted sandstone strata in Scotland".

The height of the headland reaches 17m above sea level in the south and east and 10m in the north and west. The raised beaches provide evidence of the post-glacial changes in sea level. Water depths offshore reach 10m at 300m offshore and 20m at circa 5 kilometres (3.1 mi) offshore.

== History ==
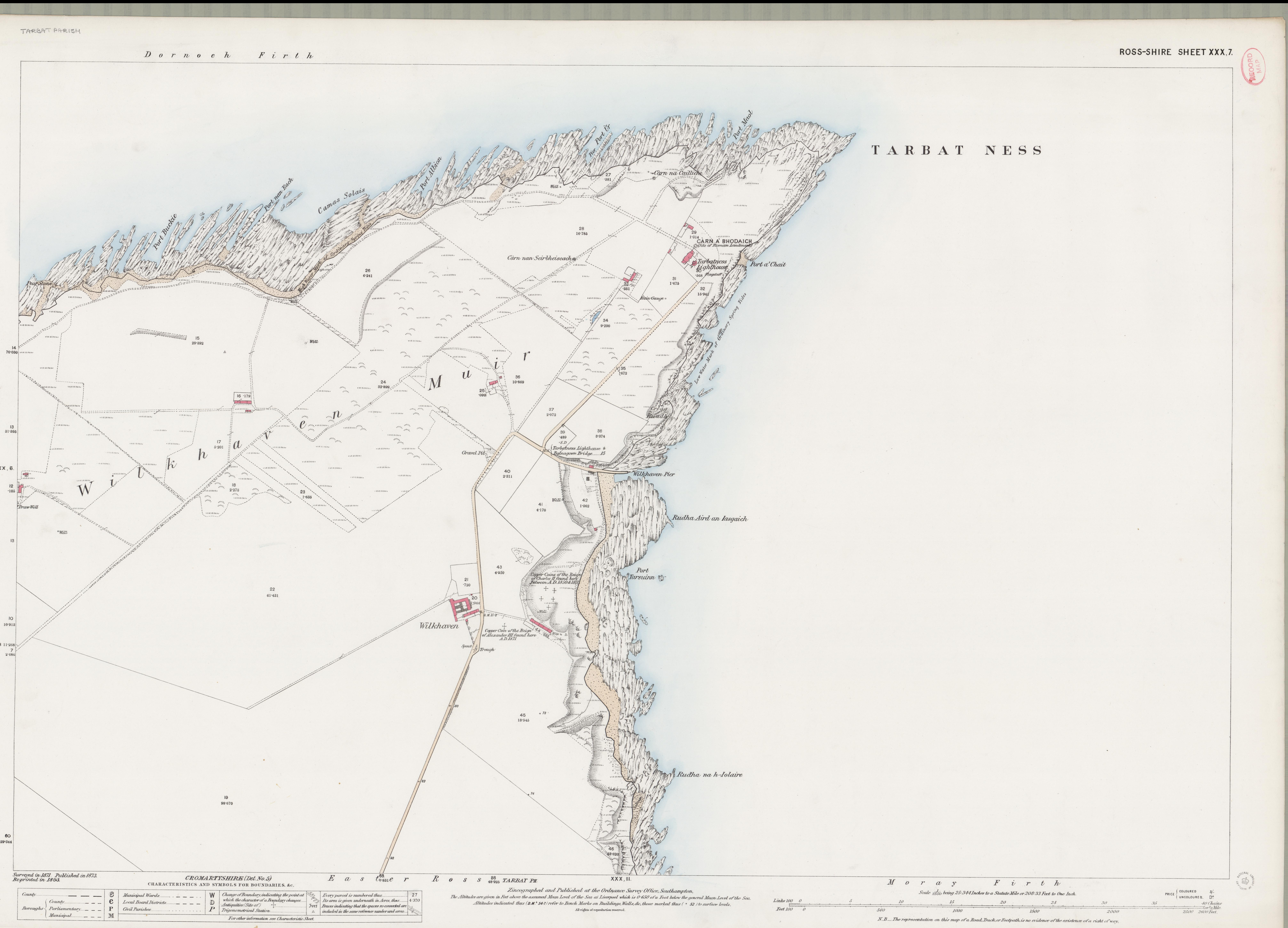
1880 Ordnance Survey map

According to the Orkneyinga Saga the Norse Earl of Orkney, Torf-Einarr "was the first man to dig peat for fuel, firewood being very scarce on the islands, at Tarbat Ness" (Torfness in the original). This is said to explain his nickname, torf meaning "peat", but it is clearly an absurd assertion.

At the Battle of Tarbat Ness in the 11th century, Thorfinn the Mighty defeated "Karl Hundason", possibly a Viking name for Macbeth.

Further down the peninsula near the village of Portmahomack, in the 1480s the Clan Ross slaughtered a raiding party from the Clan Mackay by locking them in the Tarbat Old Church and setting fire to it. This event is known as the Battle of Tarbat.

On 14 October 1941 a Saro Lerwick flying boat assigned to No. 4 OTU L7268 crashed into the sea near Tarbat Ness following failure of the port engine. The aircraft could not maintain altitude on a single engine. Six of the crew were killed, three recovered alive.

== Modern day ==
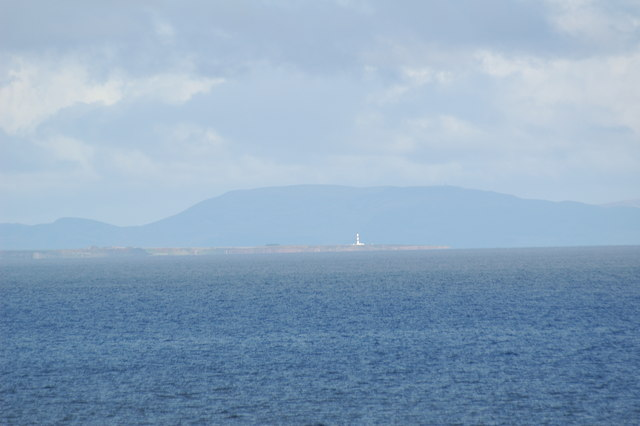
Tarbat Ness from the south across the Moray Firth

The Tarbat Ness Lighthouse is located at the north west tip of the peninsula. It was built in 1830 by Robert Stevenson and has an elevation of 53 metres (174 ft) and 203 steps to the top of the tower.

The restored Ballone Castle lies at the south east end of the peninsula north of the village of Rockfield.
