= Arboll =

Coordinates: 57°48′39″N 3°53′45″W

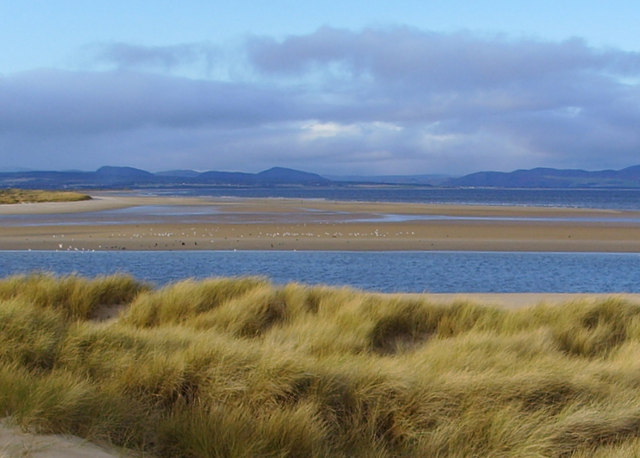
View across the Dornoch Firth to the mainland from the shore north of Arboll

Arboll (Scottish Gaelic: Àrbol) is a place in the parish of Tarbat, Easter Ross, Highland, northern Scotland made up of several scattered farms. It is situated about 10 km (6.2 mi) to the east of Tain and a short distance inland from Dornoch Firth.
