= Ballone Castle =

Coordinates: 57.81985°N 3.82504°W

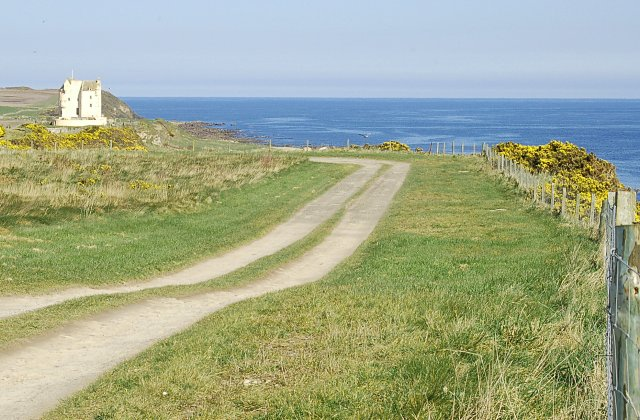

- Location within the Highland council area
- OS grid reference: NH916826
- Civil parish: Tarbat
- Council area: Highland
- Lieutenancy area: Ross and Cromarty
- Country: Scotland
- Sovereign state: United Kingdom
- Post town: Tain
- Postcode district: IV20
- Police: Scotland
- Fire: Scottish
- Ambulance: Scottish

Ballone Castle was built in the 16th century. It was unoccupied for a couple of centuries and fell into ruin. In the 1990s it was purchased and restored by an architect. The original castle was built on a Z-plan and is unusual in having one round tower and one rectangular tower.

Situated north of Rockfield on the east coast of the parish of Tarbat, Ballone castle, which was also known as Tarbat castle, was reputedly built by the Earls of Ross, but came into possession of the family of Viscount Tarbat and the Earl of Cromartie. John Mackenzie, who was created baronet of Tarbat in the County of Ross in 1628, died there in 1654.

The building is a Z-plan castle with a square tower on the south west and a circular drum-tower on the north east. After the Tarbat family moved to Tarbat House further south in the parish of Kilmuir Easter, the castle became a ruin, but it has recently been restored as a private house.

== Restoration ==
The restoration of Ballone Castle from a roofless ruin state was carried out by Lachlan and Annie Stewart, owners of ANTA, the Scottish design company. (NB ANTA has no connection to Anta Estates Ltd, owned by Lex Brown.) The Stewarts purchased the property in 1990 from a local farmer, the Castle having been abandoned in the late 18th Century. The form of Ballone was a typical Scottish Z plan building with towers on opposite diagonal corners, with an extra wing believed added in the early 1600s.

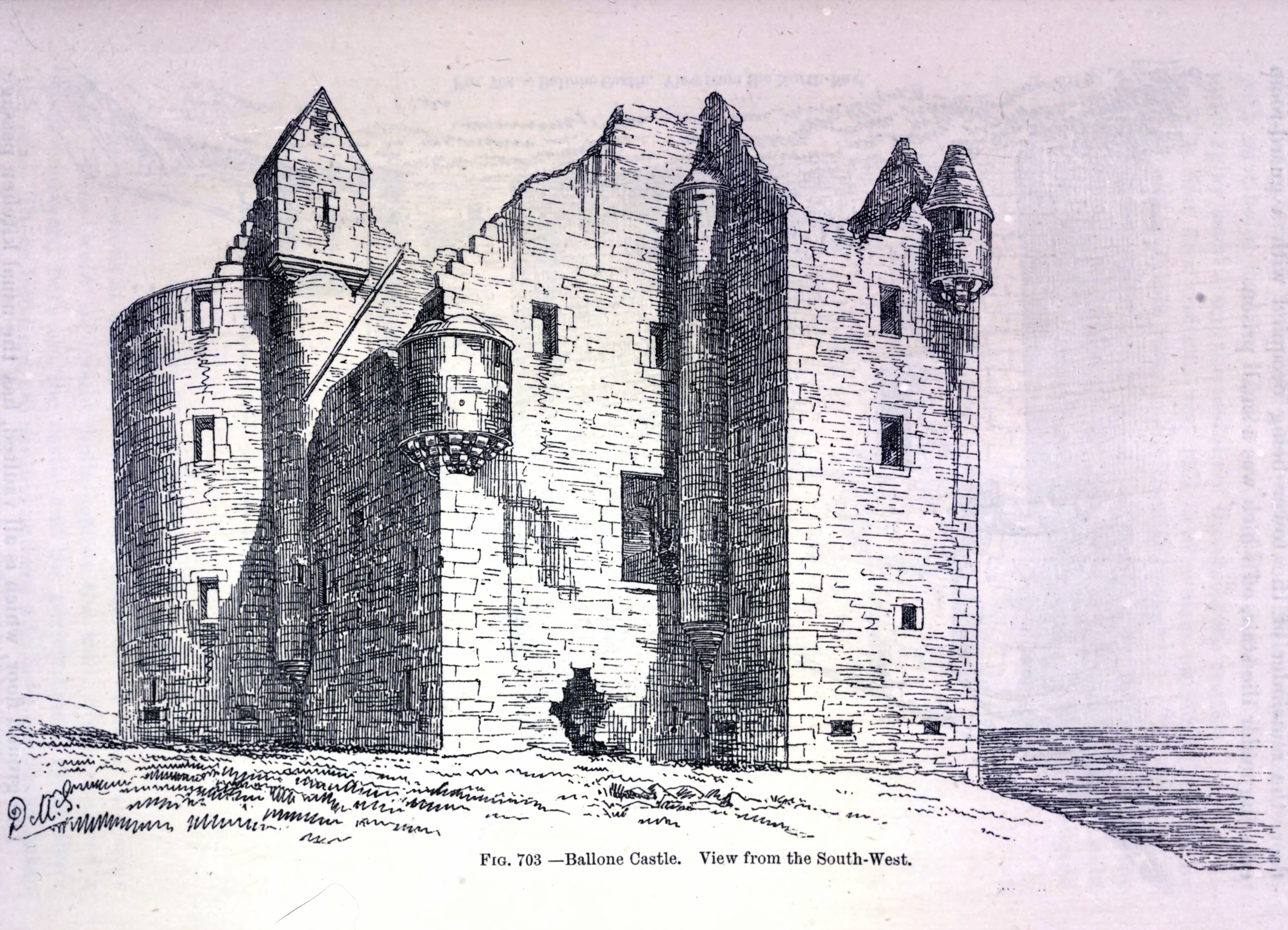
MacGibbon & Ross view of the Castle in its ruined state

On purchase, the building was in a very poor roofless condition, with losses of the caphouse, first floor vaults and part of the south end, as well as much of the later wing. The restoration took nearly ten years, the first three years being taken up with obtaining the necessary planning permissions, including having the building de-scheduled from being an Ancient Monument.

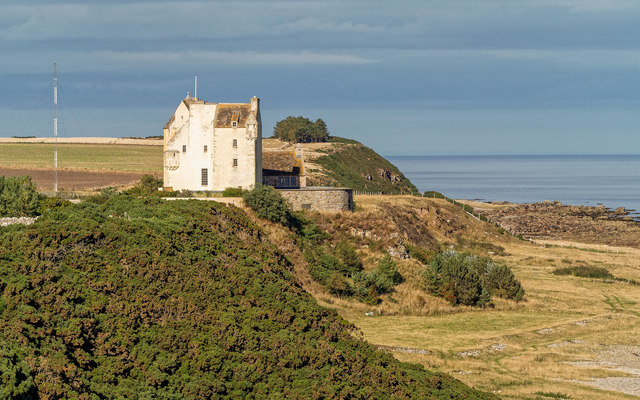
Ballone Castle restored

Apart from the extensive structural work, the interior was provided with modern services. A further phase of work was completed in 2009 when the 17th Century wing, most of which had disappeared, was largely rebuilt. Much work took place outside as well, for example with the reinstatement of part of the barmkin wall to the seaward side.
