= Tarbet Isle =

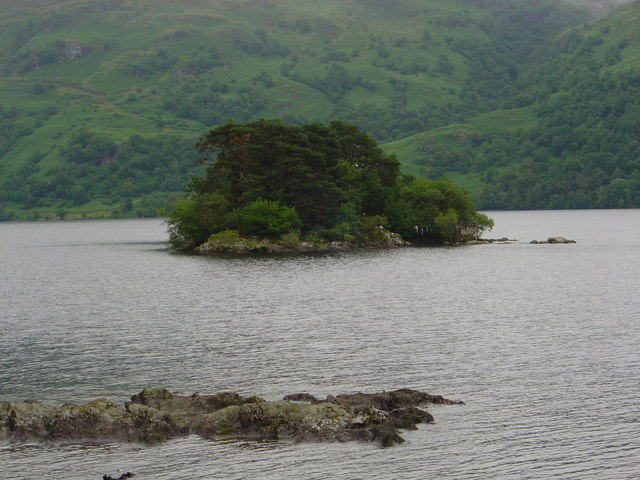

- Location within Scotland

Geography
- Coordinates: 56.211727°N 4.696227°W

Administration
- Scotland

Tarbet Isle is an island in Loch Lomond, Scotland. It is off Tarbet on the mainland. It is 10 feet (3.0 m) at its highest point, and 80 metres (260 ft) long.
