= Tarbat Ness Lighthouse =

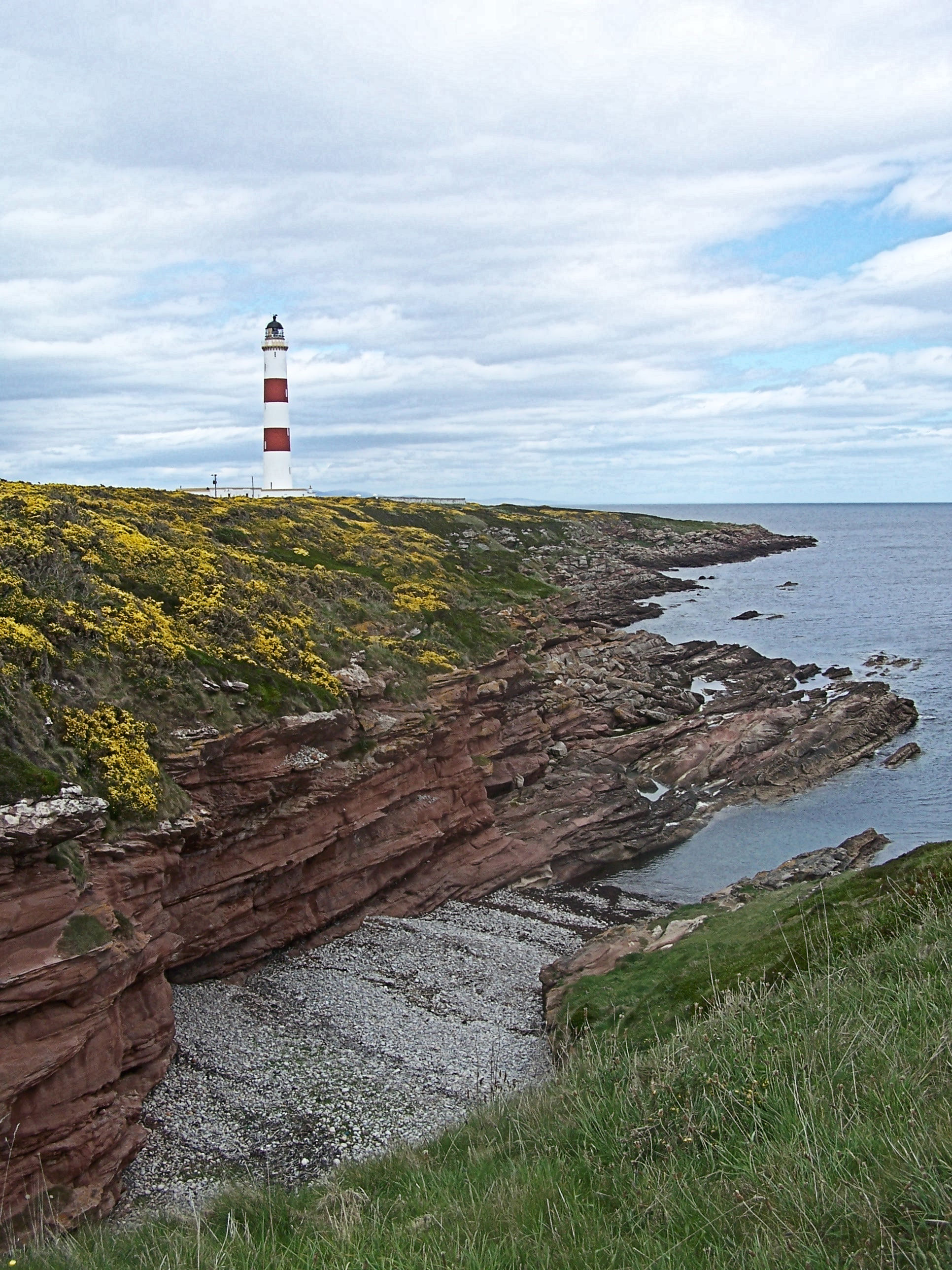
- Tarbat Ness Lighthouse
- Location: Tarbat Ness; Portmahomack; Highland; Scotland
- OS grid: NH9469587559
- Coordinates: 57.865096°N 3.776508°W

Tower
- Constructed: 1830
- Built by: Robert Stevenson
- Construction: masonry tower
- Automated: 1985
- Height: 41 metres (135 ft)
- Shape: tapered cylindrical tower with bacony and lantern
- Markings: white tower with two red bands, black lantern, ochre trim
- Power source: mains electricity
- Operator: Northern Lighthouse Board
- Heritage: category A listed building

Light
- First lit: 26 January 1830
- Focal height: 53 metres (174 ft)
- Range: 24 nautical miles (44 km; 28 mi)
- Characteristic: Fl (4) W 30s.

The Tarbat Ness Lighthouse is located at the North West tip of the Tarbat Ness peninsula near the fishing village of Portmahomack on the east coast of Scotland. It was built in 1830 by Robert Stevenson and has an elevation of 53 metres (174 ft) and 203 steps to the top of the tower.

== History ==
At the Battle of Tarbat Ness in the 11th century, Thorfinn the Mighty defeated "Karl Hundason", possibly a Viking name for Macbeth.

Further down the peninsula at Portmahomack, in the 1480s the Clan Ross slaughtered a raiding party from the Clan Mackay by locking them in the Tarbat Old Church and setting fire to it. This event is known as the Battle of Tarbat.

== Lighthouse ==
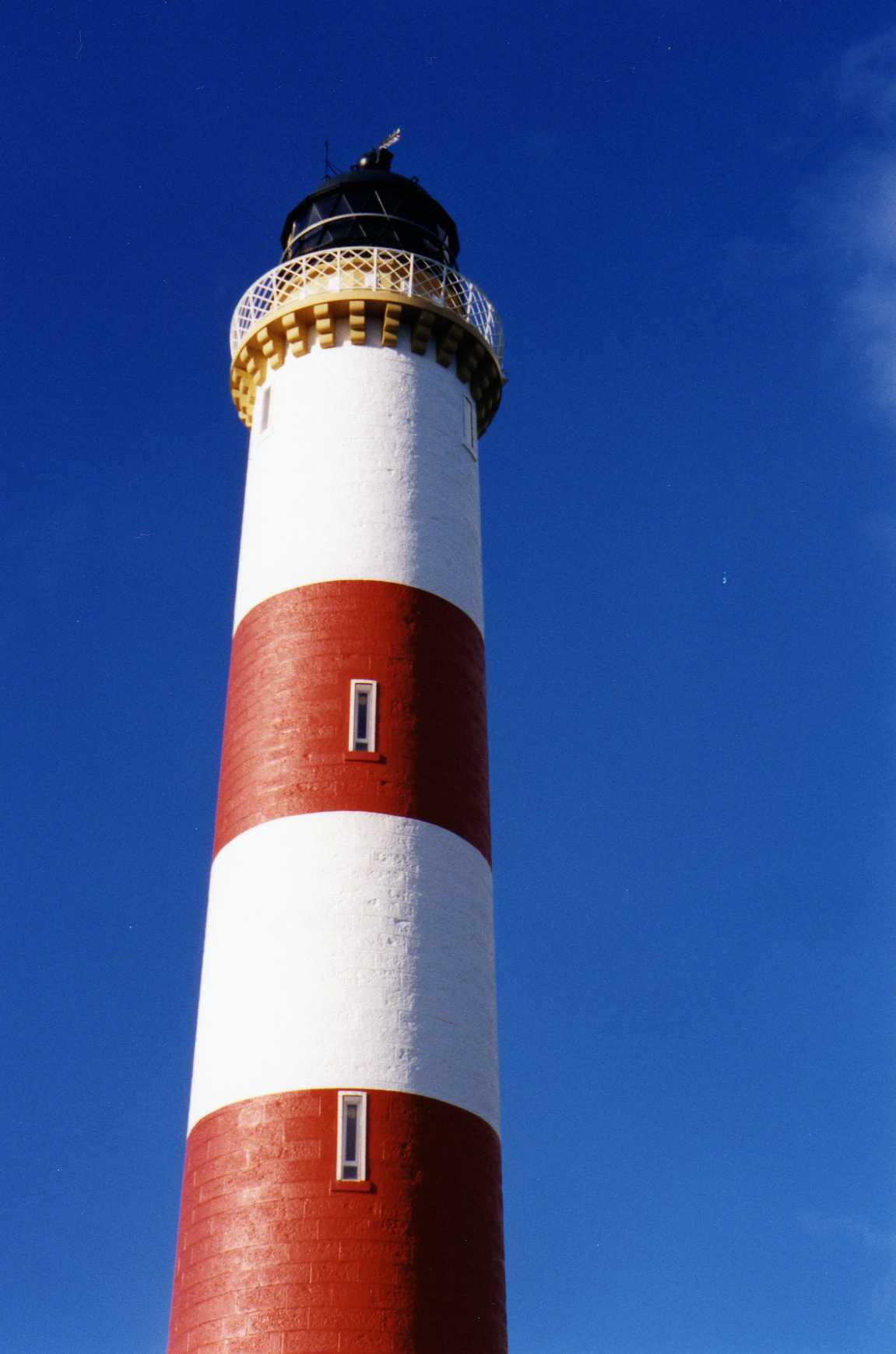
Close up view of the Lighthouse

A storm in the Moray Firth in November 1826 saw the loss of 16 vessels and brought many applications for lighthouses to be constructed at Tarbat Ness and at Covesea Skerries.

Tarbat Ness Lighthouse was engineered by Robert Stevenson for the Northern Lighthouse Board and the light was first exhibited on 26 January 1830. James Smith of Inverness was the contractor responsible for the building of the lighthouse which cost £9,361. The lighthouse tower is the third tallest in Scotland behind North Ronaldsay and Skerryvore and is notable for having two distinguishing broad red bands.

Bella Bathurst's 1999 'The Lighthouse Stevensons' refers to a rescue made by the principal keeper William Davidson of 4 of the 5 crew members of a Norwegian schooner. No date given for this. She mentions this in the context that Robert Stevenson required keepers to stay with the light and not risk rescuing shipwrecked people. It seems that even with the light, ships could still be driven ashore. She accessed the full entries of logs and diaries available at the Northern Lights Board.

Earthquake shocks were sometimes reported and Tarbat Ness once shook so that the shades and lamp glasses rattled.

According to local tradition, the site of the lighthouse was once a Roman fort and later used for witches' covens. Tarbat Ness is also a place of special interest for the observation of migratory birds.

Probably the lighthouse was built on the foundations of a Roman Empire fortification, that were later identified in the Middle Ages as a "Roman landmark" near Port a' Chait (now called "Port a Chaistell").

== See also ==
- List of lighthouses in Scotland
- List of Northern Lighthouse Board lighthouses
- List of Category A listed buildings in Highland
