= Sgeotasaigh =

Island in the Outer Hebrides, Scotland

Sgeotasaig (Gaelic)

Location
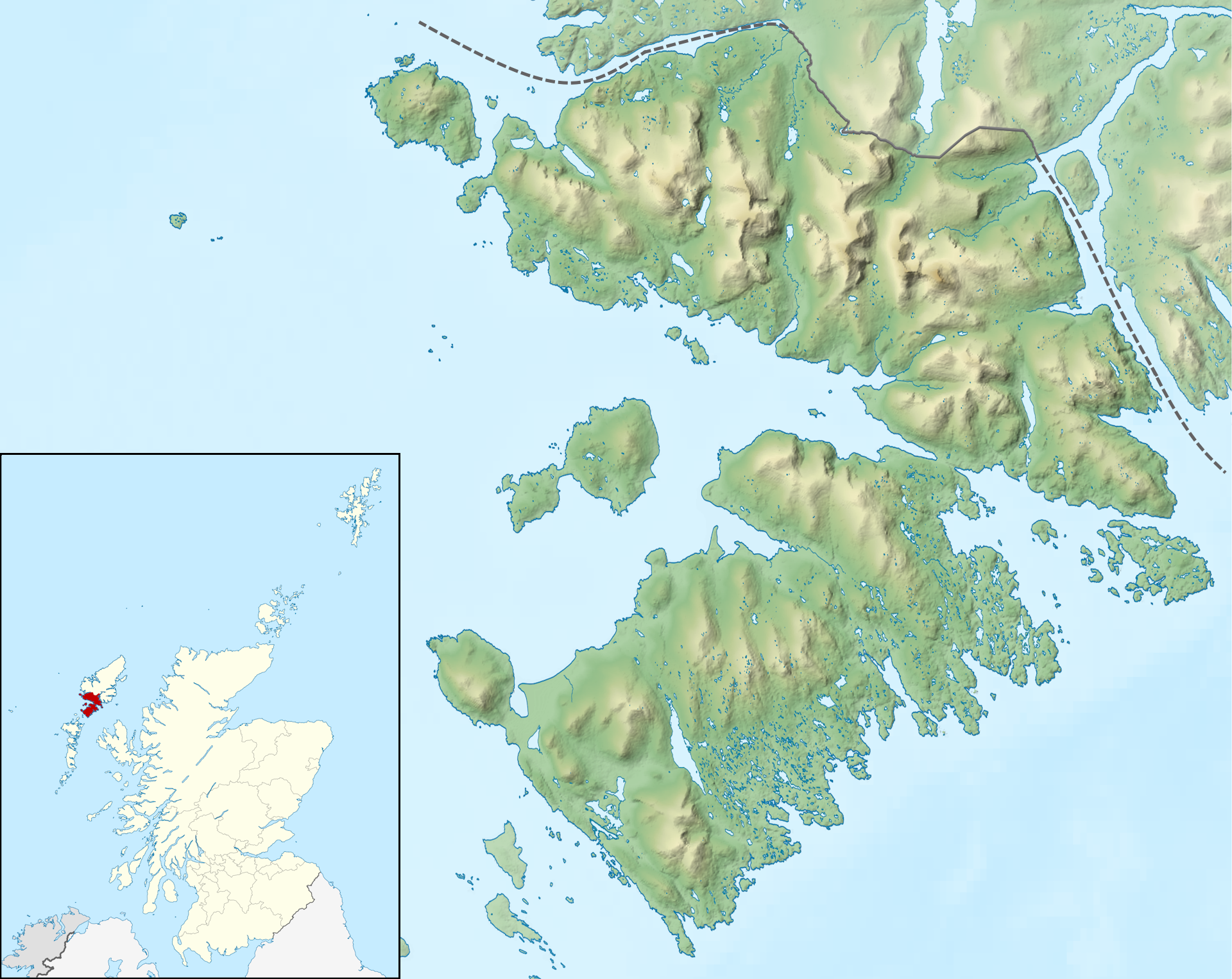
- Scotasay shown next to Harris Scotasay shown within the Outer Hebrides
- OS grid reference: NG185975
- Coordinates: 57.88°N 6.75°W

Physical geography
- Island group: Lewis and Harris
- Area: 49 ha (120 acres)
- Area rank: 205=
- Highest elevation: 57 m (187 ft)

Administration
- Council area: Na h-Eileanan Siar
- Country: Scotland
- Sovereign state: United Kingdom

Demographics
- Population: 0

Scotasay (Scottish Gaelic: Sgeotasaigh) is small island in the Outer Hebrides of Scotland. It lies 1 kilometre (0.6 miles) off the east coast of Harris and gives some shelter to the ferry port of Tarbert. There are two houses on the island, a wind turbine and a fresh water tank.

The island had 15-20 inhabitants in the early 20th century but there are no records of any permanent inhabitation since then.

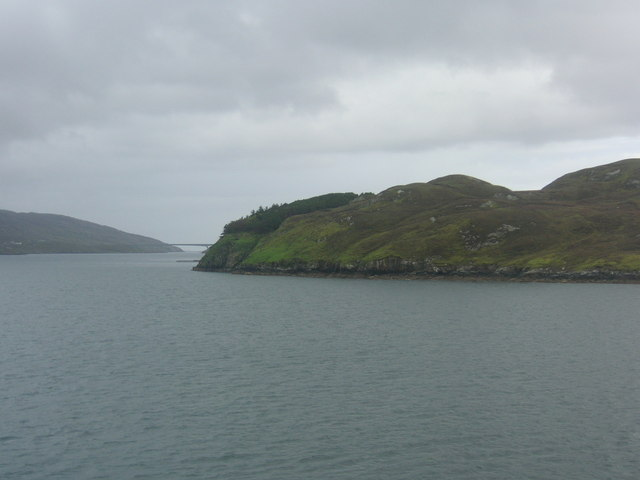
Sgeotasaigh from the Tarbert ferry.
