= Tarbet, Argyll =

Village in Argyll and Bute, Scotland

Coordinates: 56.203997°N 4.7125030°W

Tarbet: Scottish Gaelic: An Tairbeart
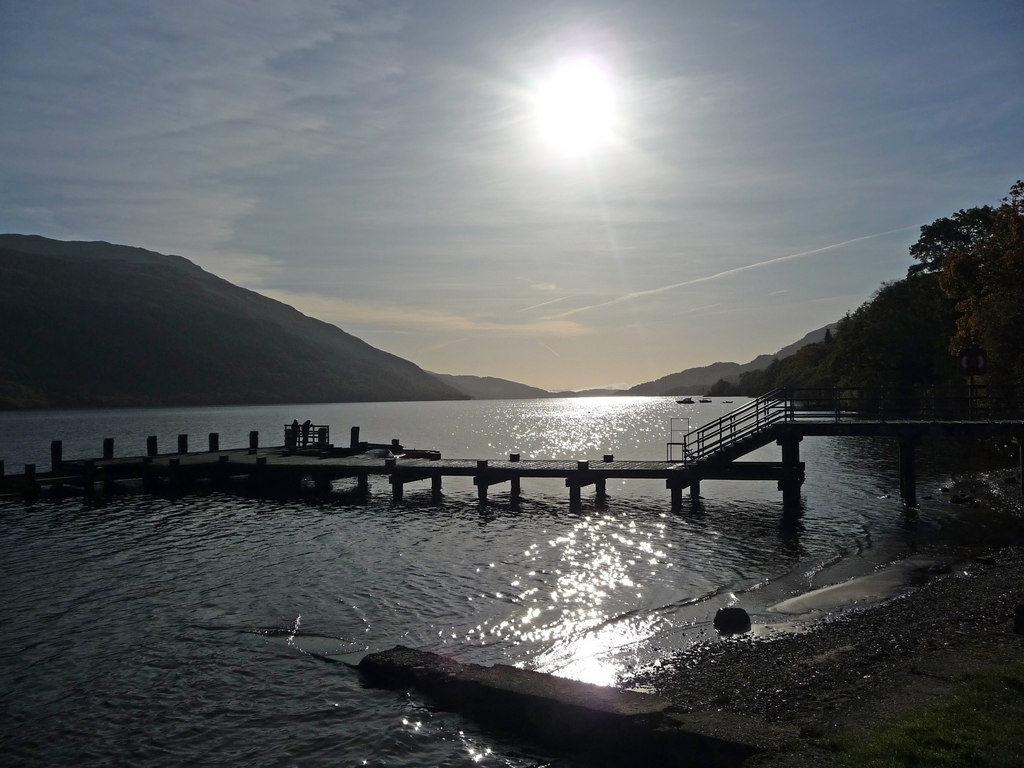
- Tarbet Pier, Loch Lomond - geograph.org.uk - 1658954

- Location within Argyll and Bute
- OS grid reference: NN 31837 04578
  - Edinburgh: 61 mi (98 km)
  - London: 375 mi (604 km)
- Council area: Argyll and Bute
- Lieutenancy area: Dunbartonshire
- Country: Scotland
- Sovereign state: United Kingdom
- Post town: ALEXANDRIA
- Postcode district: G83
- Dialling code: 01301
- UK Parliament: Argyll, Bute and South Lochaber
- Scottish Parliament: Dumbarton

Tarbet (Scottish Gaelic: An Tairbeart, in full Tairbeart Loch Laomainn 'Crossing Place of Loch Lomond') is a small village in Argyll and Bute, Scotland, located within the Loch Lomond and The Trossachs National Park.

Traditionally on the northern fringes of the historic County of Dunbartonshire, it is on the banks of Loch Lomond, and has a pier. It stands on an isthmus where Loch Long and Loch Lomond come close. The village of Arrochar stands at the head of Loch Long, at the other side of the isthmus. Arrochar and Tarbet railway station, on the West Highland Line, stands between the two villages. The village has a primary school (Arrochar Primary School), hotels and bed and breakfasts, and a Tourist Information Centre.

Its name comes from the Scottish Gaelic word for isthmus, although Tarbert is the more common anglicization, and Tarbat also exists.

In the reign of William the Lyon, Gille Chriosd, lord of Tarbet granted unrestricted access to his woods for mature timbers for the building of Paisley Priory.

The village is formed around the junction of the A82 (Glasgow/Inverness) and A83 (Tarbert/Campbeltown).

The area around Arrochar and Tarbet has become the scene of "squirrel wars". The red squirrel is resisting the offensive by the grey squirrel taking place across United Kingdom, since there is a type of woodland they find more favourable than most.

== Notable residents ==
- Mamie Martin, missionary, (born Telfer) was raised here with her three sisters from 1897.
- Prof William John McCallien FRSE, geologist and landscape artist

== Gallery ==
Tarbet
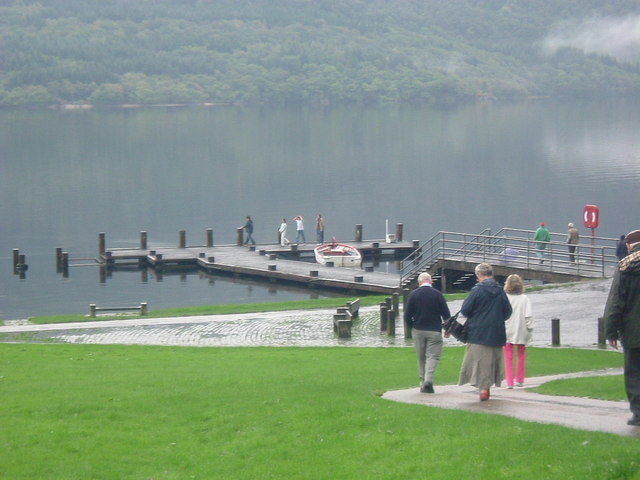
Tarbet Pier - geograph.org.uk - 252215

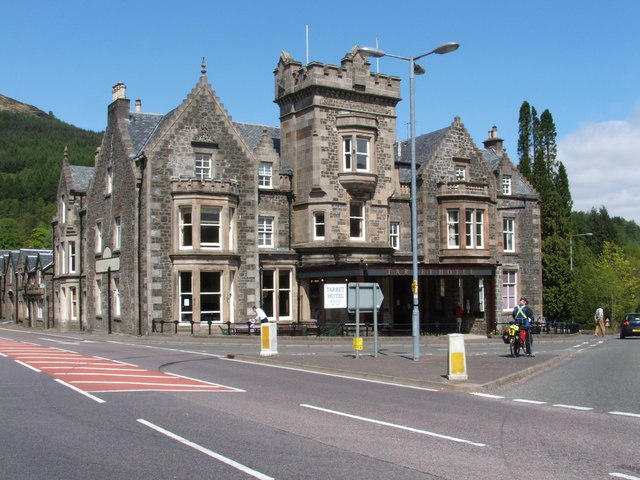
Tarbet Hotel Tarbet - geograph.org.uk - 1091022
