= Loch Tarbert, Jura =

Loch Tarbet, Jura, Scotland

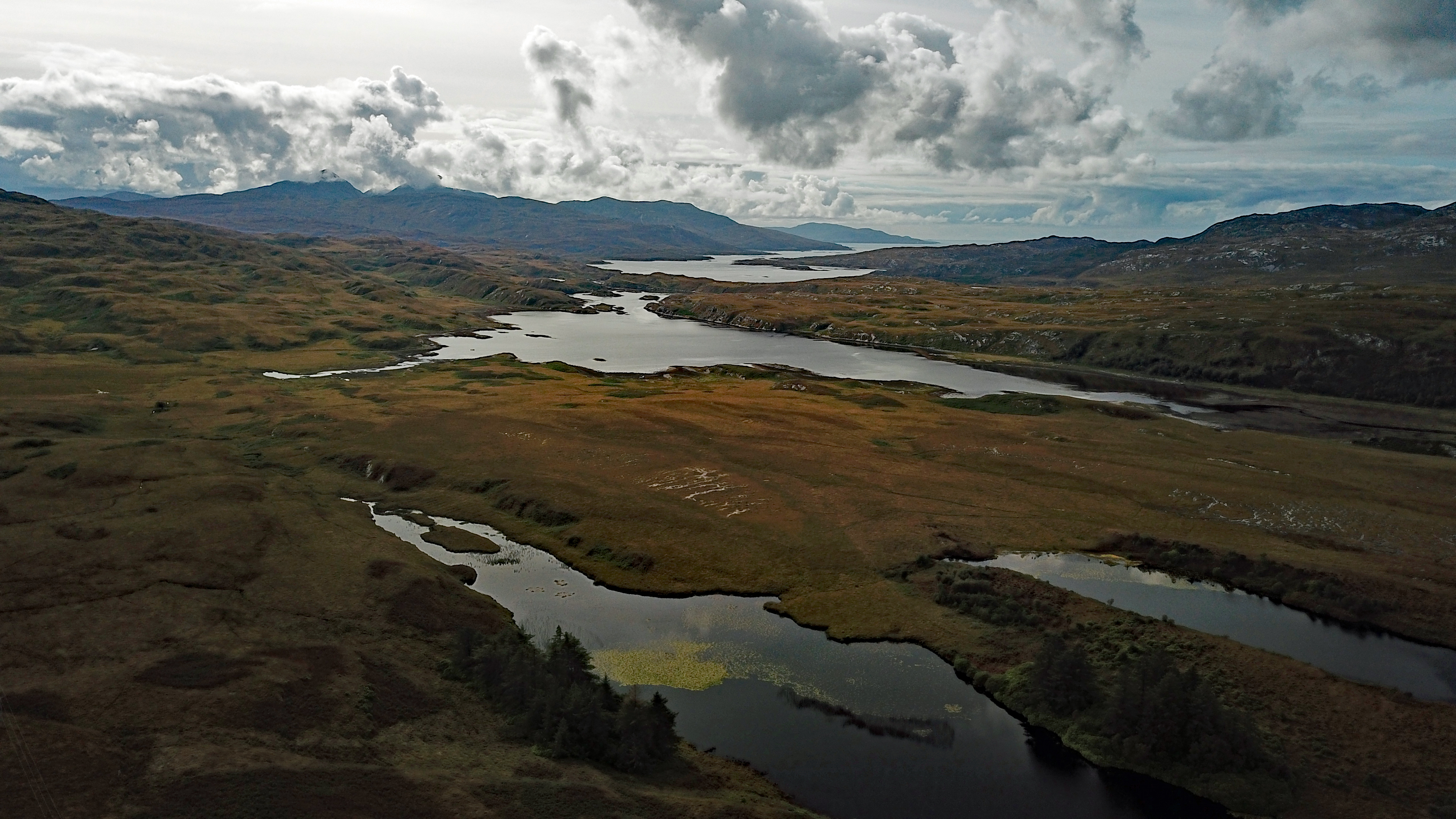
- Loch Tarbert from the East

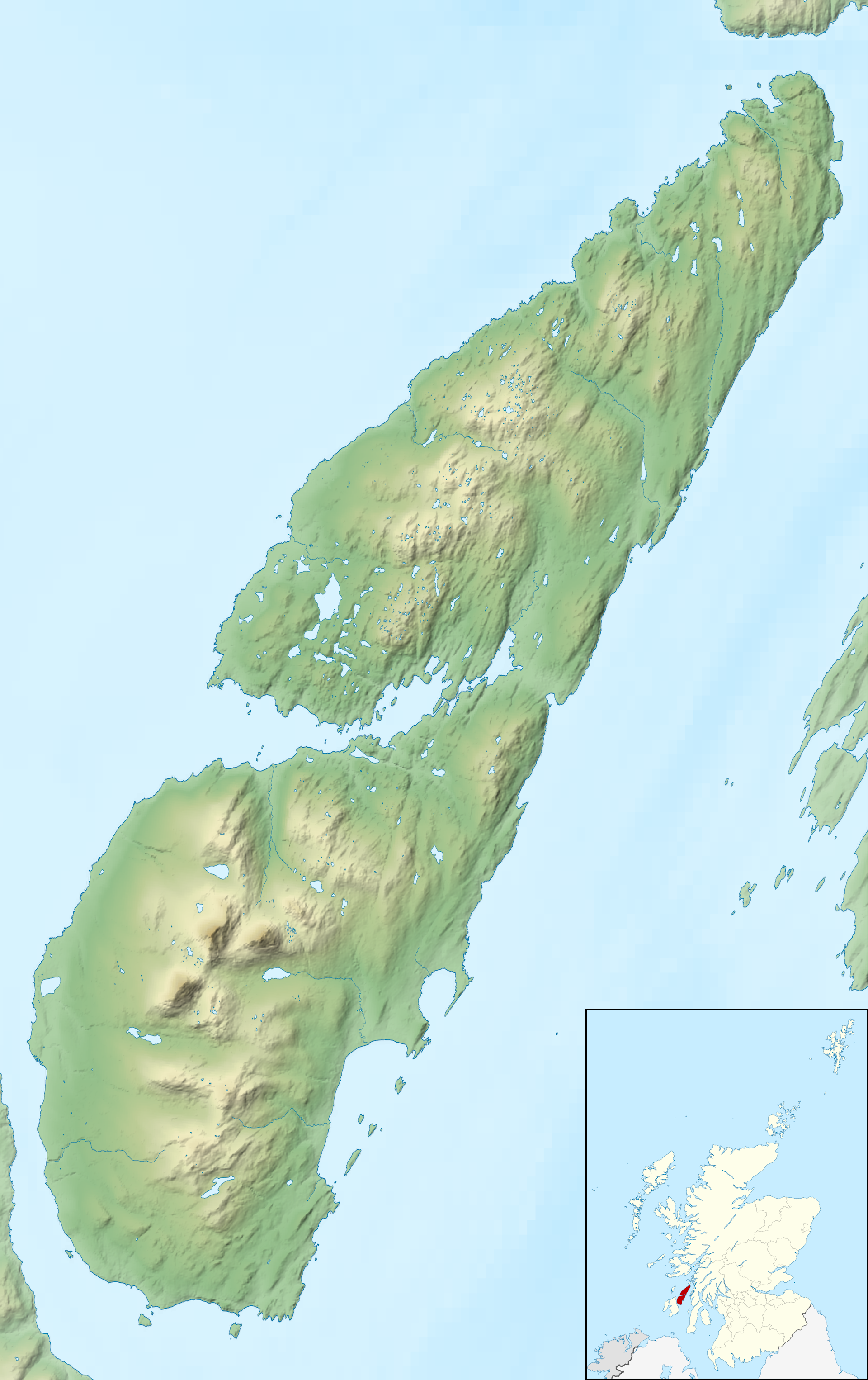
- Location within Jura
- Coordinates: 55.958°N 5.942°W
- Frozen: No

Loch Tarbert, Jura is a sea loch on the west coast of the island of Jura, on the west coast of Scotland.

As the name Tarbert suggests, it comes close to cutting the island in half.
