= George Mackenzie, 1st Earl of Cromartie =

Scottish statesman (1630–1714)

The Right Honourable The Earl of Cromartie FRS
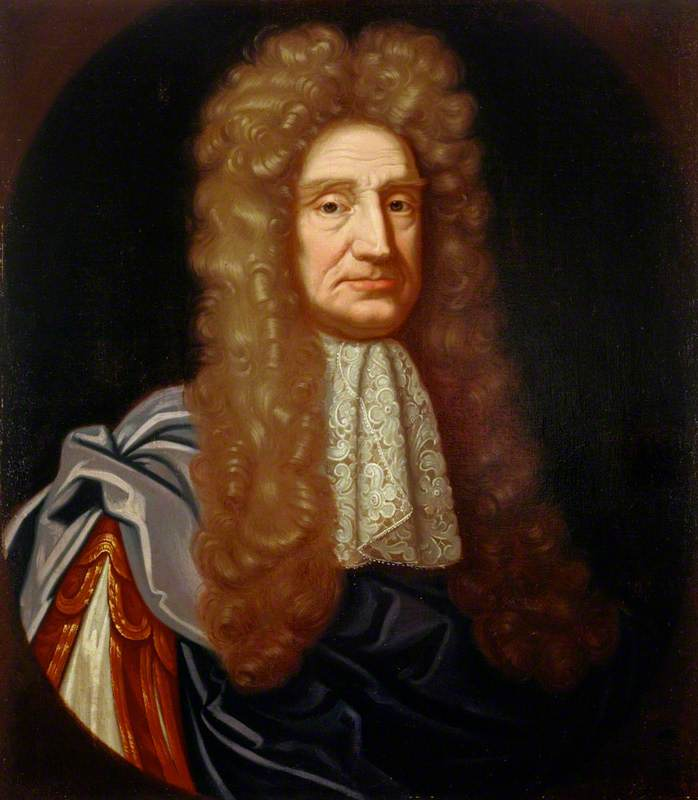
- The 1st Earl of Cromartie

Secretary of Scotland
- In office 21 November 1702 – 17 October 1704
- Monarch: Queen Anne
- Preceded by: The Duke of Queensberry
- Succeeded by: The Earl of Roxburghe

Personal details
- Born: 1630 Innerteil, Fife, Scotland
- Died: 17 August 1714 (aged 84) Tarbat House, Ross-shire, Scotland
- Education: University of St Andrews; University of Aberdeen

George Mackenzie, 1st Earl of Cromartie FRS (1630–1714), known as Sir George Mackenzie, 2nd Baronet from 1654 to 1685 and as the Viscount of Tarbat from 1685 to 1703, was a Scottish statesman.

== Life ==
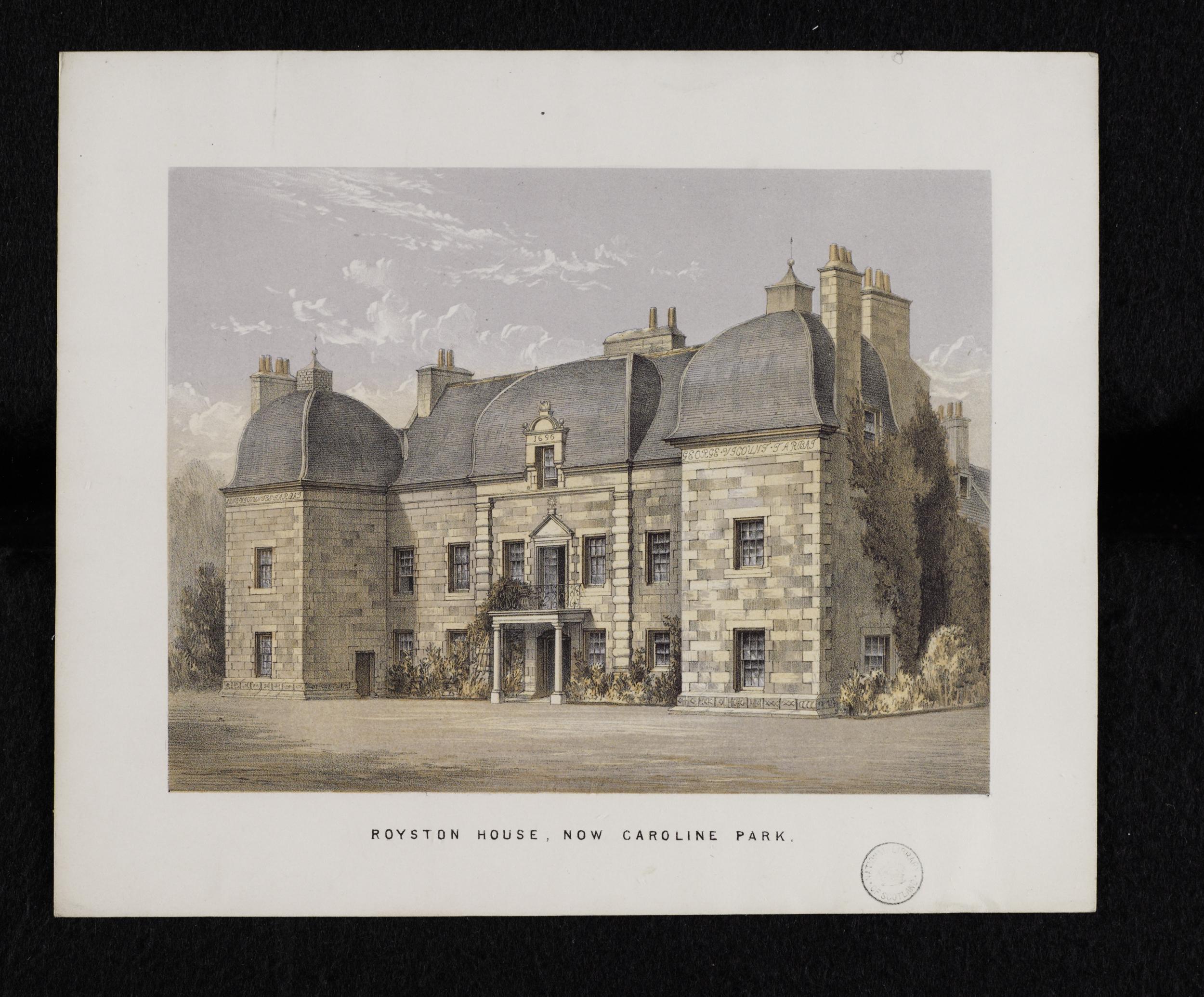
Royston House, now known as Caroline Park House

He was born at Innerteil, near Kinghorn, Fife, in 1630, was eldest son of Sir John Mackenzie of Tarbat – grandson of Sir Roderick MacKenzie and great-grandson of Colin Mackenzie of Kintail, and nephew of the first Lord Mackenzie of Kintail, Ross-shire, the progenitor of the Mackenzies, earls of Seaforth. His mother was Margaret, daughter of Sir George Erskine of Innerteil, lord Innerteil, a lord of the court of session.

He was educated at the St Andrews University and King's College, Aberdeen, where he graduated in 1646. He became an accomplished classical scholar, and cultivated interests in literature and science, but politics was his chief interest. In 1653, he joined Glencairn's uprising on behalf of Charles II, and on the defeat of John Middleton, 1st Earl of Middleton, on 26 July 1654, fled to the castle of Eilean Donan. He succeeded to the family estates on his father's death on 10 September 1654, but after escaping to the continent, remained in exile until the Restoration, occupying much of his leisure in the study of law.

On the Restoration of Charles II in 1660, Middleton, Mackenzie's old commander, had the management of Scottish affairs, and Mackenzie was his chief confidant.

His relative, Sir George Mackenzie, describes him as at this time "a passionate cavalier" but keen ambition influenced his political conduct as much as passion or prejudice.

On 14 February 1661, he was nominated a Lord of Session with the judicial title of Lord Tarbat, and was elected the same year a member of the estates for the shire of Ross.

He is credited by Sir George Mackenzie with being the chief originator of the act passed in 1661 rescinding all statutes passed in the Parliament of 1640 and subsequently, but the chief aim of the act was to prepare for the establishment of episcopacy. It was not likely suggested to Tarbat by Archbishop Sharp.

In their policy on behalf of episcopacy, Middleton and Tarbat found themselves at this time opposed by John Maitland, 1st Duke of Lauderdale, the Minister for Scottish Affairs. They resolved therefore, to ruin him, the design being that Tarbat, who 'was then much considered at court, as one of the most extraordinary men that Scotland had produced', should succeed to Lauderdale's place as Secretary of State. To this end, in 1662, they devised the famous 'act of billeting,' the credit of which probably belongs to Tarbat. The proposal was by a secret vote of the estates to declare certain persons incapable of holding any office of public trust; but when the result of the vote – which disqualified Lauderdale among others – was sent up to the king he 'threw the act of billeting into his cabinet, declaring that he would not follow their advice nor would he disclose their secret'. Further inquiry, instigated by Lauderdale, led to the discovery that Middleton had been misleading both the king and the parliament, and he was dismissed from office, while Tarbat, for his connection with the intrigue, was on 16 February 1664 deprived of his seat on the bench.

He remained in disgrace till 1678, when, through the offices of Sharp with the Duke and Duchess of Lauderdale, he was on 16 October appointed Lord Justice General of Scotland. On the following day he received a pension of £200 from Charles II, and on November was admitted a privy councillor of Scotland. The day after his admission he presented a letter from the king, to be recorded in the books of sederunt, intimating the king's pardon for his connection with the act of billeting. On 1 October 1681, he was appointed Lord Clerk Register, and on 11 November following was again admitted one of the ordinary lords of session.

On the fall of Lauderdale in 1682, Tarbat succeeded to the position of chief minister of the king in Scotland, and retained this position till the Revolution. In 1683 he bought an estate north of Edinburgh belonging to Andrew Logan and built Royston House (later renamed Caroline Park), which in 1705 he unsuccessfully tried to sell to the government as an official residence for the Lord Chancellor. Shortly after the accession of James II, he was on 15 February 1685 created Viscount of Tarbat and Lord Macleod and Castlehaven in the peerage of Scotland to him and heirs male of his body.

At the Revolution Tarbat, so soon as he discerned that the cause of James was lost, resolved if possible to secure his own safety and his continuance in power. By advising in council the disbanding of the militia, he greatly facilitated the peaceful establishment of the new government. In the 'Leven and Melville Papers' (p. 14) there is printed, under date 25 April 1689, an exoneration and discharge to him of his office of register, securing him – on account of his faithful service both in putting 'in order and method' the various documents under his charge and recovering many that were missing — 'from all danger in his person or estate, notwithstanding of any acts, writings, councils, speeches, or any crimes committed by him.' It would appear, however, that he was not finally exonerated until after 17 January 1690.

In 1689, he sent a memorial to the government, proposing a joint recognition of presbytery and episcopacy. After Killiecrankie he was employed by the government to treat with the Highland clans. He thoroughly understood Highland politics, and his prudent counsel was of considerable advantage in bringing about a settlement. If, says Macaulay, his plan (of distributing a few thousands sterling among the Highland chiefs) had been tried when he recommended it, instead of two years later, 'it would probably have prevented much bloodshed and confusion'. On 5 March 1692, he was restored to the office of clerk register, but resigned it towards the close of 1695. According to Secretary Johnstone, he had been caught 'grossly malversizing in his office of clerk both in public and in private business'.

On 3 April 1696, Tarbat was elected to the court of directors of the Company of Scotland trading to Africa and the Indies.

On the accession of Queen Anne, Tarbat was on 21 November 1702 appointed one of the Secretaries of State, and on 1 January 1703, was created Earl of Cromarty. Subsequently, he was chosen as a Scottish representative peer. In 1704, he resigned the office of secretary, and on 26 June 1705 was made lord justice general, retaining office till 1710.

Lockhart states that though 'he pretended to favour the Royal Family [the family in exile] and the episcopal clergy, yet he never did one act in favour of any of them, excepting that when he was secretary to Queen Anne he procured an Act of Indemnity and a letter from her recommending the episcopal clergy to the Privy Council's protection; but whether this proceeded from a desire and design of serving them is easy to determine when we consider that no sooner did Queen Anne desert the Tory party and maxims, but his Lordship turned as great a Whig as the best of them, joined with Tweedale's party to advance the Hanoverian succession in the Parliament 1704, and was at last a zealous stickler and writer in favour of the Union'. Cromarty's able and judicious advocacy of the union with England is, however, his chief title to honour as a statesman, and atones for much that was foolish and inconsistent in his career.

He died at New Tarbat 17 August 1714, and was buried, not as he had directed beside his second wife at Wemyss, but beside his ancestors at Dingwall.

== Family ==
By his first wife, Anna, daughter of Sir James Sinclair of Mey, baronet, he had four sons : Roderick, who died young; John, who succeeded his father; Kenneth, and James. James had a daughter who married to become the eccentric Lady Anne Dick. James later adopted the title Lord Royston.

By his second wife, Margaret, countess of Wemyss, he had no issue.

== Works ==
Cromarty retained through life varied interests outside politics. He was consulted by Sir Robert Moray in regard to the formation of the Royal Society of London, and contributed to its 'Transactions' the following papers:

- 'Remarks on the Transactions of April 1675' ('Transactions,' x. 305);
- 'Account of Severe Wind and Frost' (ib. x. 307);
- 'Observations on Natural History made in Scotland' (ib. x. 396);
- 'Mosses in Scotland,' in a letter to Dr. Hans Sloane, 15 Nov. 1670 (ib; xxvii. 296)

An 'Account of Hirta and Rona' (islands of the Hebrides) was published in 'Miscellanea Scotica,' 1818, ii. 79. He published a large number of political pamphlets, some of which are now rare. They include:

- 'Memorial for his Highness the Prince of Orange in relation to the Affairs of Scotland, together with the Address of the Presbyterian party in that Kingdom to his Highness, and some Observations on that Address by two Persons of Quality,' published anonymously, London, 1689. 2* 'Parainesis Pacinca. or a Persuasive to the Union of Britain,' Edinburgh, 1702, in which he exhaustively demonstrates that 'there remains but one mode of union, viz. that of being united in one body, under one and the same head, by a perpetual identifying oneness.'
- 'A Few Brief and Modest Reflections persuading a Just Indulgence to be granted to the Episcopal Clergy and People of Scotland,' 1703.
- 'Continuation of a Few Brief and Modest Reflections. Together with a Postscript vindicating the Episcopal Doctrine of Passive Obedience,' 1703.
- 'Speech to the Parliament of Scotland, 11 July 1704' (on the reading of the queen's speech).
- 'A Letter from E. C. [Earl of Cromarty] to E. W. [Earl of Wemyss] concerning the Union, and a Second Letter on the British Union,' 1706.
- 'Letter to M. of P.' 8.'Trialogues: A Conference between Mr. Con, Mr. Pro, &c, concerning the Union,' 1706 (anonymous).
- 'Friendly Response to a Letter concerning Sir George Mackenzie's and Sir John Nisbet's Observations and Response on the Matter of the Union,' 1706.
- ' Several Proposals conducing to a Further Union of Britain,' 1711.

His other works are:

- ' A Vindication of King Robert III from the Imputation of Bastardy, by the clear Proof of Elizabeth Mure (daughter to Sir Adam Mure of Rowallan), her being the First Lawful "Wife of Robert the II, then Steward of Scotland and Earl of Strathern,' Edinburgh, 1695.
- 'Several Proposals conducing to a Further Union of Britain,' 1711.
- ' Historical Account of the Conspiracy of the Earl of Gowrie and of Robert Logan of Restalrig against James VI,' 1713.
- 'A Vindication of the Same from the Mistakes of Mr. John Anderson, preacher of Dumbarton, in his Defence of Presbytery,' 1714. He also published:
- 'Synopsis Apocalyptica, or a Short and Plain Explication of Daniel's Prophecy and of St. John's Revelation in concert with it,' 1707 (an attempt to apply the prophecies to events and to calculate by years when the events predicted will happen).

His 'Vindication of the Reformation of the Church of Scotland, with some Account of the Records,' was printed in the Scots Magazine for 1802 from a manuscript in the possession of Constable, the publisher. A 'History of the Family of Mackenzie,' by Sir George Mackenzie, first earl of Cromarty, is printed in Fraser's Earls of Cromartie, ii. 462-573.

A letter he wrote to Robert Boyle is included in Robert Kirk's The Secret Commonwealth (1692).

Legal offices
Preceded by Sir Archibald Primrose of Carrington	Lord Justice General; 1678–1680	Succeeded by The Earl of Queensberry
Preceded by The Earl of Lothian	Lord Justice General; 1704–1710	Succeeded by Earl of Ilay
Political offices
Preceded by The Duke of Queensberry	Secretary of State; 1702–1704	Succeeded by The Earl of Seafield
Peerage of Scotland
New creation	Earl of Cromartie; 1703–1714	Succeeded by John Mackenzie
New creation	Viscount of Tarbat; 1685–1714	Succeeded by John Mackenzie
Baronetage of Nova Scotia
Preceded by John Mackenzie	Baronet (of Tarbat); 1654–1704	Resigned
