= Rockfield, Highland =

Coordinates: 57.81985°N 3.82504°W

Rockfield: Scottish Gaelic: Creag Tarail Bhig
- Location within the Highland council area
- OS grid reference: NH916826
- Council area: Highland
- Country: Scotland
- Sovereign state: United Kingdom
- Post town: Tain
- Postcode district: IV20 1
- Police: Scotland
- Fire: Scottish
- Ambulance: Scottish

Rockfield (Scottish Gaelic: Creag Tarail Bhig) is a hamlet in the parish of Tarbat, on the Tarbat Peninsula, near the village of Portmahomack, Easter Ross, Highland, Scotland. There is a small stone jetty and the traditional way of life included fishing and agriculture. Rockfield is generally east-facing, below the level of a raised beach.

== Coastal Walks ==
Rockfield is a good place to start or finish a coastal walk. In a south-south-west direction you can walk from Rockfield to the Seaboard Village of Balintore. In a north-north-east direction you can walk from Rockfield to Tarbat Ness, round the headland and return to Portmahomack on the other side of the peninsula.

=== Rockfield to Balintore ===
This walk places the Moray Firth on your left with the opportunity to observe dolphins and occasional whales. The distance is reported as 8.5 km with modest changes in elevation.

=== Rockfield to Tarbat Ness and on to Portmahomack ===
This walk may be broken into two halves. The first half, from Rockfield to Tarbat Ness is in a general north-north-west direction with the Moray Firth on the right-hand side. At Tarbat Ness, you can break your walk by viewing the Tarbat Lighthouse and tide pools. A road runs to the Lighthouse and an old salmon station.

The second half of the walk is on the opposite side of the Tarbat peninsula. You will be walking in a general south-south-west direction with more protected arm of the sea to your right-hand side. The walk ends in the village of Portmahomack.
