= John Mackenzie, Lord MacLeod =

British army officer and politician

Major-General Lord MacLeod
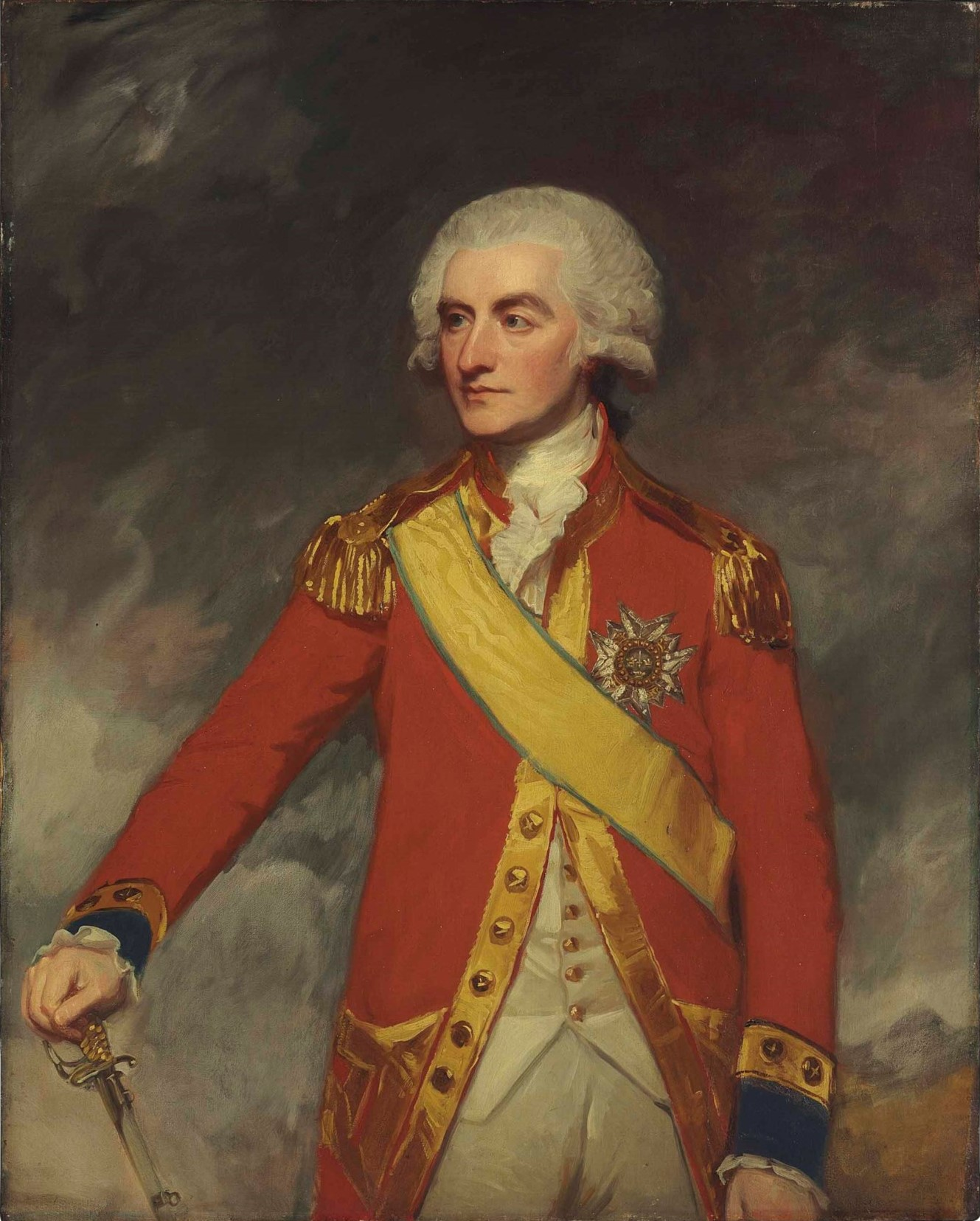
- Portrait by George Romney, 1788
- Born: 1727; Castle Leod near Strathpeffer, Scotland
- Died: 2 April 1789 (aged 61–62); Edinburgh, Scotland
- Resting place: Canongate Kirkyard, Edinburgh, Midlothian, Scotland
- Title: Member of Parliament
- Term: 1780–1784
- Political party: Tory
- Spouse(s): Margery Forbes, daughter of James Forbes, 16th Lord Forbes
- Parent: George Mackenzie, 3rd Earl of Cromartie
- Awards: Commander, Order of the Sword of Sweden

Notes
- Lieutenant (Clan MacLeod), Lieutenant-General (Swedish Army), Regimental Colonel (Highland Scotland), Major-General (British Army)

Major-General John Mackenzie, Lord MacLeod (1727 – 2 April 1789) was a British Army officer and politician who represented Ross-shire in the House of Commons of Great Britain from 1780 to 1784.

== Life ==
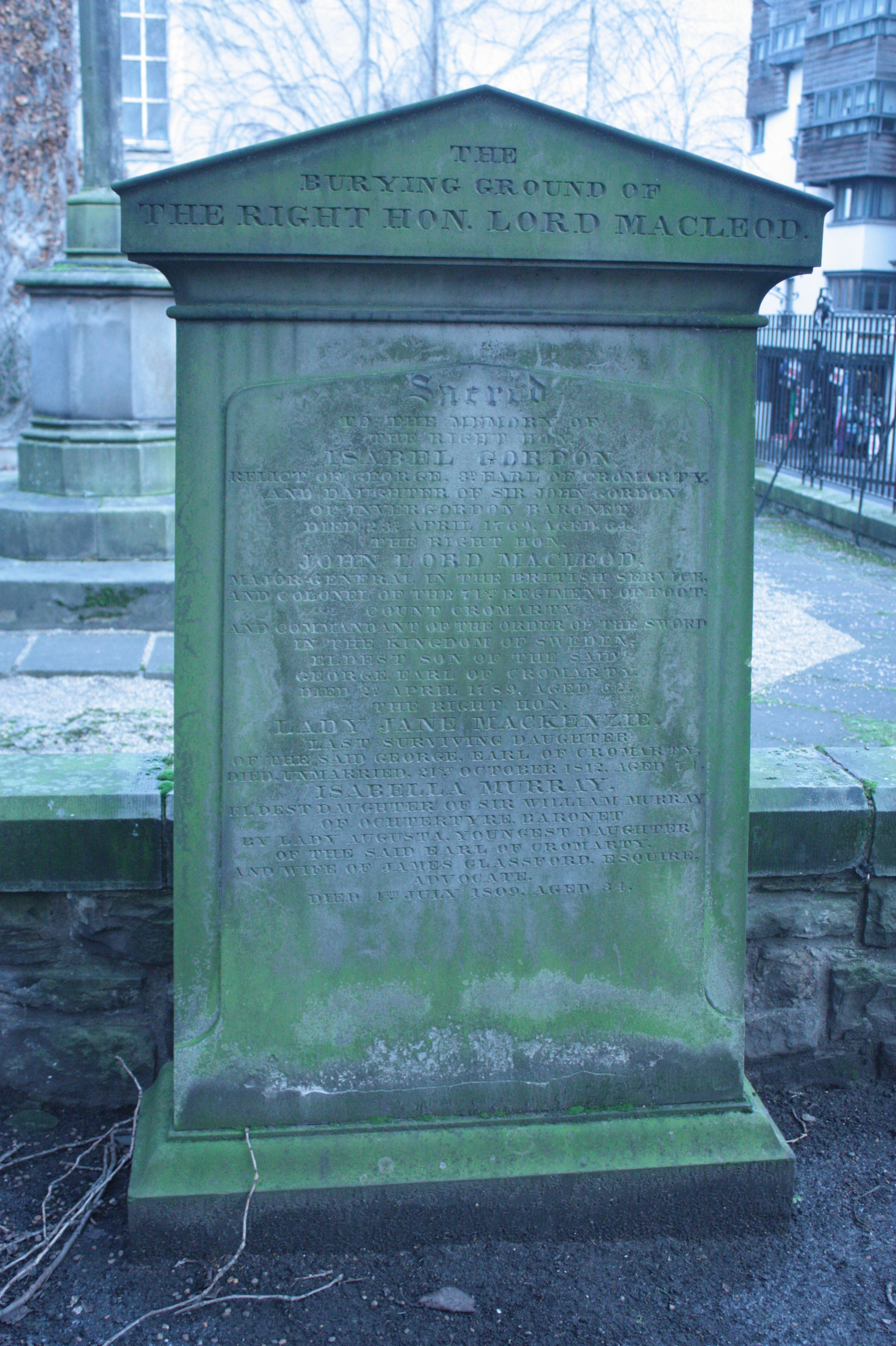
Mackenzie's grave in Canongate Kirkyard, Edinburgh

Born at Castle Leod near Strathpeffer, Scotland, he was the eldest son of George Mackenzie, 3rd Earl of Cromartie and Isabel Gordon. He was a Freemason, his father being the Grand Master, Grand Lodge of Scotland in 1737-38. He married Margery, daughter of James Forbes, 16th Lord Forbes. Mackenzie was styled Lord MacLeod in 1731. Sailing to join the Jacobite Army on board the sloop Hound, he fought with his father's clan at the Battle of Falkirk, leading Cromartie's Regiment of about 500 clansmen in the Jacobite rising of 1745 during which he was taken prisoner, with his father and 218 others, on 15 April 1746 at Dunrobin Castle, by a party of the William Sutherland, 17th Earl of Sutherland's militia the day before the Battle of Culloden. On 20 December 1746 he was not brought to trial before the Commissioners, though he pleaded guilty to high treason, but received full pardon on 26 January 1748 on condition "that within six months of his 21st birthday he would convey to the Crown all his rights in the Earldom" which was not restored until the reign of Queen Victoria. He would later write The Memorials of John Murray of Broughton: sometime secretary to Prince Charles. Narrative by John Mackenzie, Lord Macleod eldest son of the Earl of Cromartie., the only other person not to stand trial for treason and pardoned.

Leaving Scotland, Mackenzie initially lived in Berlin with Field Marshal James Francis Edward Keith, who assisted him in obtaining a commission in the Swedish Army in 1750. Receiving financial assistance to equip himself for service from Georges de Boulogne, on the recommendation of Lord George Murray, he was stationed in Swedish Pomerania. Described by Murray as "a young man of real merit", he served in the Swedish army for 27 years with distinction, reaching the rank of lieutenant general and being decorated with the award of Commander of the Order of the Sword. During the Seven Years' War he joined the Prussian Army as a volunteer, serving in the Pomeranian War of 1757. Created a Count of Sweden he returned to Scotland in 1771 and joined the British Army, becoming the first colonel of the 73rd Foot from 1772, which became the 71st Foot in 1777.

On 9 December 1778 his Swedish title was recognised by George III. In 1779 he was sent to India with his regiment to serve in the Second Anglo-Mysore War, joining the army under Major-general Sir Hector Munro at St. Thomas Mount, Madras in July 1780. Although he wasn't with the battalion at the time, it was completely destroyed during the Battle of Conjeveram on 10 September 1780. Following disagreements with Munro over the defeat, Mackenzie returned to Scotland, but remained the regiment's colonel until his death. Mackenzie settled in Ross-shire, whose parliamentary constituency he had represented in the House of Commons of Great Britain as a Tory MP between 1780 and 1784.

Promoted to major general in 1782, Mackenzie regained his family estates in 1784, restored to him by Act of Parliament, for a payment of £19,010 for debts on the estates. He spent the rest of his life on the estate which he greatly improved, planting thousands of trees, and building a new mansion, Tarbat House. Mackenzie died in Edinburgh on 2 April 1789 following a year of illness, without descendants and was buried at the Canongate Kirkyard. His estates passed to his cousin Kenneth.

== Sources ==
- G.E. Cokayne; with Vicary Gibbs, H.A. Doubleday, Geoffrey H. White, Duncan Warrand and Lord Howard de Walden, editors, The Complete Peerage of England, Scotland, Ireland, Great Britain and the United Kingdom, Extant, Extinct or Dormant, new ed., 13 volumes in 14 (1910–1959; reprint in 6 volumes, Gloucester, U.K.: Alan Sutton Publishing, 2000), volume III, page 546.
- Charles Mosley, editor, Burke's Peerage, Baronetage & Knightage, 107th edition, 3 volumes (Wilmington, Delaware, U.S.A.: Burke's Peerage (Genealogical Books) Ltd, 2003), volume 1, page 979.

Military offices
New post	Colonel of the 73rd (Highland) Regiment of Foot (MacLeod's Highlanders); 1777–1789	Succeeded by William Gordon
Parliament of Great Britain
Preceded by James Stuart-Mackenzie	Member of Parliament for Ross-shire; 1780 – 1784	Succeeded by Francis Humberston Mackenzie
