= East Loch Tarbert =

Loch in the Outer Hebrides, Scotland

Coordinates: 57°52′7″N 6°45′10″W

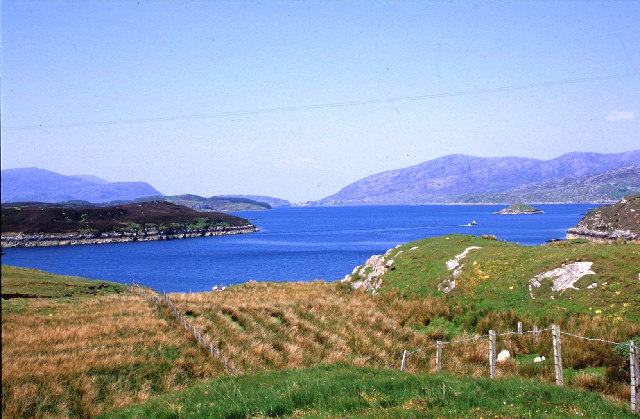
East Loch an Tairbeairt from N. Harris

East Loch Tarbert (Scottish Gaelic: Loch an Tairbeairt) is a sea loch that lies to the east of Harris in the Outer Hebrides of Scotland. The loch contains several small islands including Sgeotasaigh, Stiughiag, Stiughiag na Leum and Rosaigh and the larger bridged island of Scalpay. The Caledonian MacBrayne ferry from the Isle of Skye to Harris reaches Tarbert via this loch.

The village of Tarbert lies on the small isthmus which separates East Loch Tarbert from West Loch Tarbert and joins North and South Harris.
