= East Loch Tarbert, Argyll =

Loch in Argyll and Bute, Scotland

East Loch Tarbert
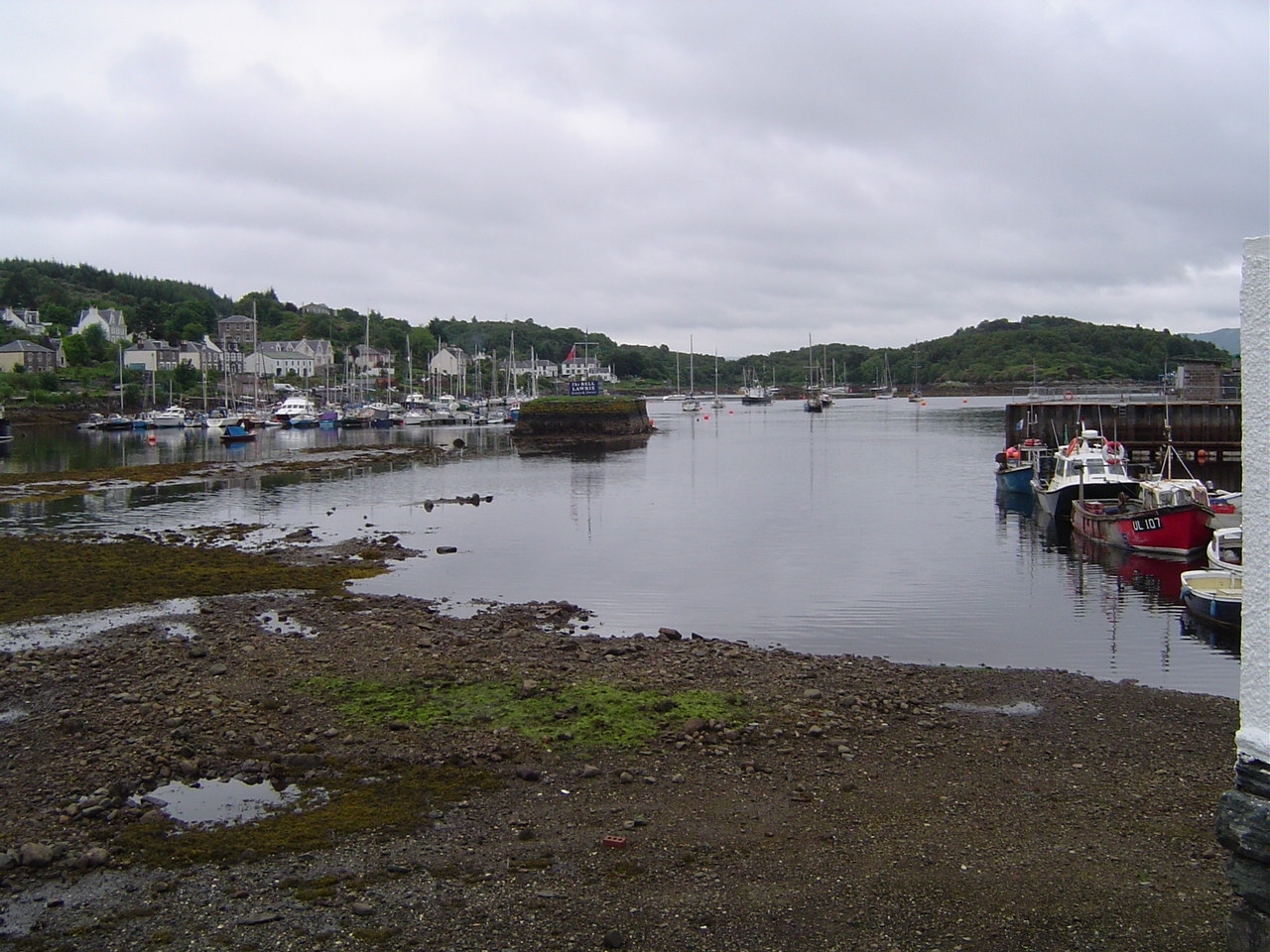
- East Loch Tarbert, looking towards Loch Fyne

- Location within Scotland
- Location: Loch Fyne, Firth of Clyde
- Coordinates: 55°52′3″N 5°23′55″W
- Type: Sea Loch
- Frozen: No

East Loch Tarbert, Argyll is a small sea loch on the eastern side of the Kintyre Peninsula, in Argyll and Bute, west of Scotland. It is a part of the much larger Loch Fyne. The village of Tarbert is distributed along the shores of the loch. East Loch Tarbert is separated from West Loch Tarbert by an isthmus, that is only 1.5 kilometres (0.93 mi) long.

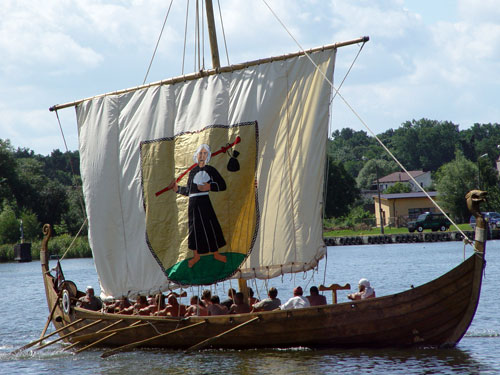
Full-scale replica of a Viking longship

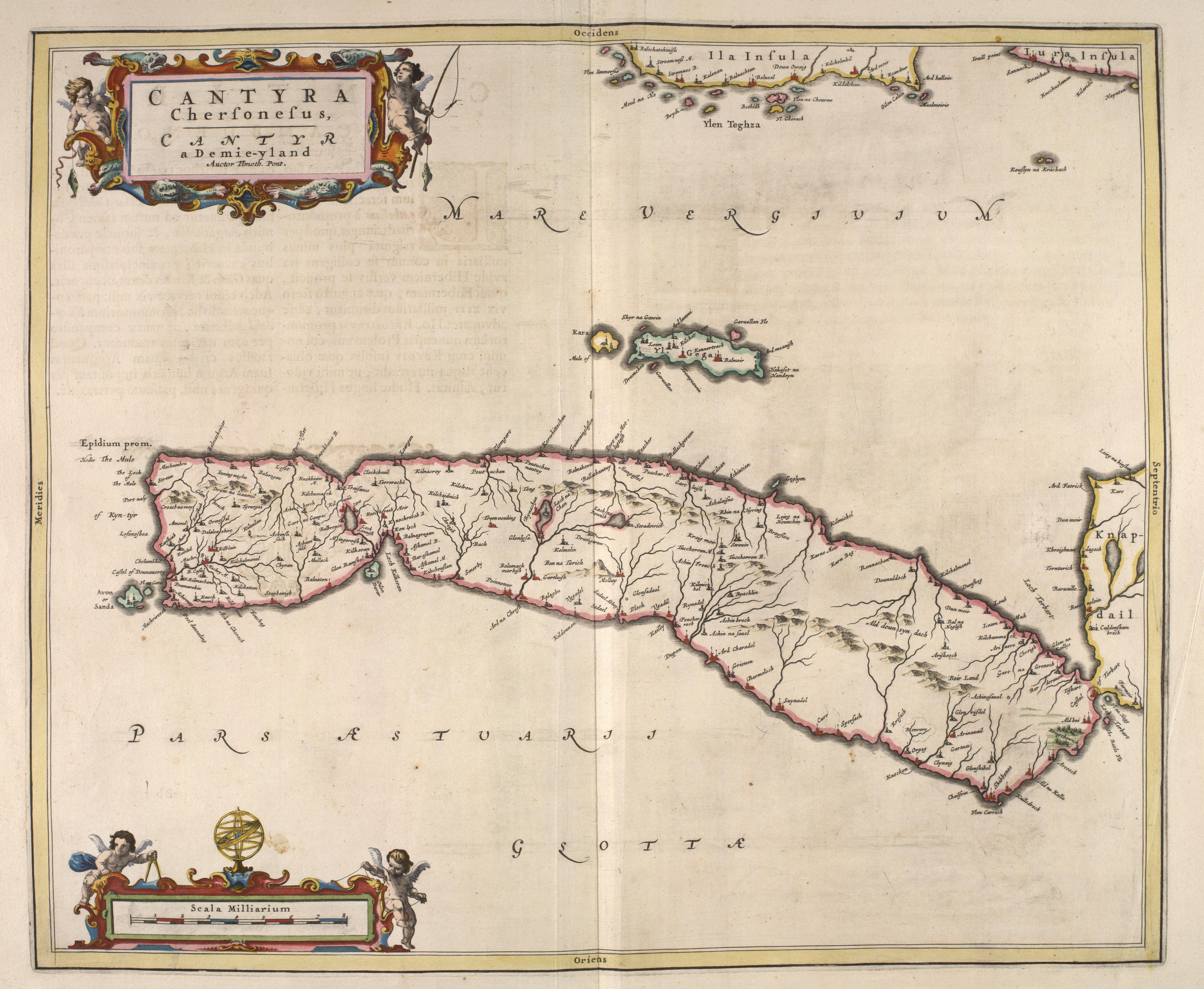
Blaeu's 1654 Atlas with the Tarbert isthmus at right. The map is oriented with west at the top.

According to Snorri Sturluson's Heimskringla, Magnus Barefoot, King of Norway, had his longship dragged across this isthmus as part of a campaign to increase his possessions in the Hebrides. He made an arrangement with King Malcolm III of Scotland that he could take possession of land on the west coast around which a ship could sail. Magnus declared that Kintyre had "better land than the best of the Hebrides", and by taking command of his ship's tiller and "sailing" across the isthmus he was able to claim the entire peninsula, which remained under Norse rule for more than a dozen years as a result.

More than two centuries later Robert the Bruce completed a similar feat during the Scottish Wars of Independence in order to impress the clan chieftains of Argyll. He used tree trunks as rollers.

In the 18th century Thomas Pennant recorded that sea-going vessels of up to 10 tonnes (9.8 long tons) were being hauled over the isthmus in order to avoid the dangers of storms and tidal races in the seas surrounding the Mull of Kintyre. James Watt surveyed the area and decided that it was feasible to construct a canal between the two lochs. Some 60 years later it was estimated that the cost for a cut without locks would be £90,000 but delays in implementation and the construction of the Crinan canal in 1801 rendered the plan redundant.

In the modern era the Tarbert (Loch Fyne) Harbour Commissioners control the loch, an area defined as "from the point of Garvell on the North, to the Oakenhead or Rudha Loigste point on the South". There are various quays and slipways in the inner harbour and 80 pontoon berths for yachts and other leisure craft.
