= Tarbat =

Coordinates: 57.832662°N 3.8294612°W

Tarbat: Scottish Gaelic: Tairbeart; Scots: Tarbert
- Location of Tarbat parish in Highland
- Area: 10.7 sq mi (28 km^{2})
- Population: 870 (2011)
  - Density: 81/sq mi (31/km^{2})
- OS grid reference: NH9148584020
- Civil parish: Tarbat
- Community council: Tarbat
- Council area: Highland
- Lieutenancy area: Ross and Cromarty
- Country: Scotland
- Sovereign state: United Kingdom
- Post town: Tain
- Police: Scotland
- Fire: Scottish
- Ambulance: Scottish

Tarbat (Scottish Gaelic: tairbeart, meaning 'a crossing or isthmus') is a civil parish in Highland, Scotland, in the north-east corner of Ross and Cromarty.

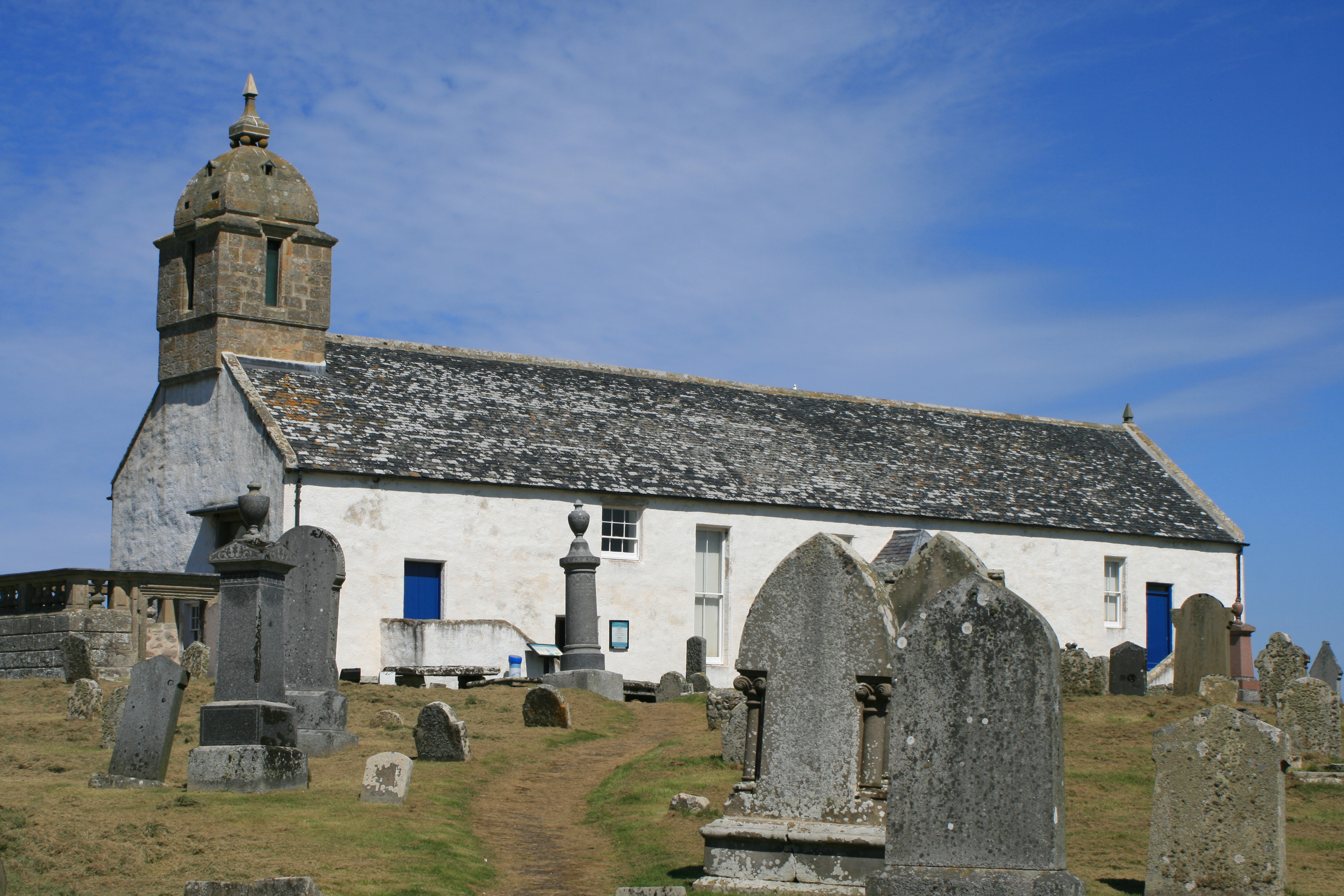
Old parish church of Tarbat

The parish is a promontory between Dornoch Firth to the north-west and Moray Firth to the east, while to the south it borders the parish of Fearn. The peninsula is relatively flat, the highest point being the hill adjacent to Geanies House which reaches 86 metres (283 feet), on the southern border of the parish. The coast along the Dornoch Firth is about eight miles (thirteen kilometres) in length, while the Moray Firth coast is about seven miles (eleven kilometres). The latter coast has a rock-bound front, with progressively higher cliffs south of Rockfield, reaching 100–200 feet (30–60 metres). Along the Dornoch Firth the shore is not steep and near Inver the foreshore is almost 1 mile (1.5 kilometres) wide. The village of Portmahomack, the main settlement in the parish, is sited on the Dornoch Firth 9 miles (14 kilometres) northeast of Tain.

Tarbat Ness, the headland of Tarbat separating the Dornoch and Moray Firth coasts, lies three miles (five kilometres) northeast of Portmahomack. It is 15 metres (50 feet) high and the site of Tarbat Ness Lighthouse, which dates from 1830. Just over one mile (1.5 kilometres) west-southwest of Tarbet Ness lighthouse, is the site of Castlehaven fort, by a creek of that name (Port-Chasteil is Gaelic). Although there is no building remaining, the foundation of a considerable wall is traceable, which defended the fort on the landward side. The title Baron Castlehaven is named after this fort and is held as a subsidiary title by the Earls of Cromartie.

The hamlet of Wilkhaven lies on the east coast 1/2 mile (800 metres) southwest of Tarbet Ness lighthouse. The area to its north is known as Wilkhaven Muir.

Situated north of Rockfield on the east coast, Ballone Castle, which was also known as Tarbat castle, was reputedly built by the Earls of Ross, but came into possession of the family of Viscount Tarbat and the Earl of Cromartie. Previously a ruin, it has recently been restored as a private house.

The Geanies House, the only mansion house in the parish, is situated on the eastern coast close by the southern border with the parish of Fearn. Here, coastal cliffs rise from the shore to a height of around 200 feet (60 metres).

In the west of the parish near Inver is Arboll, an area of scattered farms and the site of a former township or hamlet. Arboll is dissected by Arboll Burn, which forms the community council boundary at this point.

At the last census (2011), the population of the civil parish was 870. The area of the parish is 2,760 hectares (6,820 acres). Tarbat parish is also a Community Council area (excludes part of the parish next to Inver).

== History ==
Originally Pictish, Norse speakers were settled in Tarbat in the 10th century and the names Arboll and Bindal are of Norse origin. By 12th century, Gaelic predominated and remained predominant until the 1880s or later. In 1881, 1,244 were Gaelic-speaking out of a population of 1,878, but at the last census in 2011, only 4% had some knowledge of Gaelic.

The name Tarbat was first attested in 1226, when Andrew vicar of Arterbert authored a church document. The Ar- prefix is the same as Ard-, a common prefix meaning 'promontory' (Gaelic: airde). Tarbat is mentioned in the early 16th century referring to a place, farm settlement and parish.

The Battle of Tarbat took place in the 1480s near Portmahomack, when the clan Ross cornered a raiding party from the clan Mackay.

Prior to 1628 Tarbat parish extended from Tarbat Ness to the south of Fearn parish. In that year, the parish of Fearn was established, with the former Fearn Abbey as the parish church.

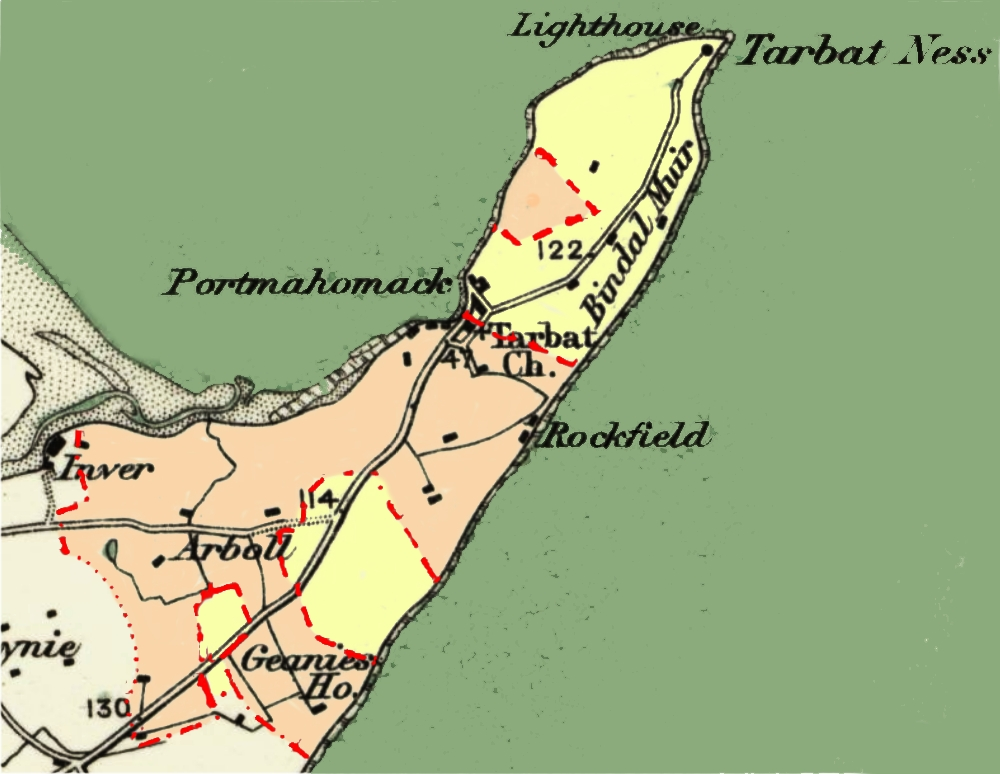
Map of Tarbat Parish Pink: Ross-shire Yellow: Cromarty-shire

By 1479 the Tarbat lands were divided into Wester Tarbert and Easter Tarbert. Wester Tarbat belonged to the Bishop of Ross, who later passed it to others. Easter Tarbat was held by the Earl of Ross and passed in 1507 to James Dunbar and family. In 1610 Easter Tarbat, with the adjoining area of Easter Aird, passed to George Monro of Meikle Tarrel, whose combined estate was sold in 1623 to Sir Rorie McKenzie of Coigach. Thus all these lands were united in one family and would later become part of Cromarty-shire. Sir Rorie’s son, John Mackenzie was created baronet of Tarbat in the County of Ross in 1628. When he died in 1654, at Castle Tarbat (i.e. Ballone Castle), he was succeeded by his son, Sir George Mackenzie, 2nd Baronet who was a prominent statesman and judge (including as Secretary of State from 1702 to 1704). In 1685, George Mackenzie was raised to the Peerage of Scotland as Lord MacLeod and Castlehaven and Viscount of Tarbat. In 1703 the viscount was made Earl of Cromartie, but the title Viscount Tarbat continued as the courtesy title of the earl’s eldest son.

In 1698 Viscount Tarbat procured an Act of Parliament transferring the land he owned as Viscount Tarbat from the county of Ross-shire to that of Cromarty-shire (an earlier Act of 1685 to the same effect, in the reign of the deposed James VII, having been repealed). In Tarbat parish these were: (i) Easter Aird and Easter Tarbat comprising all the parish east of the parish church, except the church and the Hillton enclave; (ii) Meikle Tarrel on the eastern coast. As a result, 1,160 hectares (2,870 acres) of the parish (over a third), known as the barony of Tarbat, were in the county of Cromarty-shire, before its amalgamation with Ross-shire.
