= Nutrition analysis =

Determining nutritional content of food

Nutrition analysis refers to the process of determining the nutritional content of foods and food products. The process can be performed through a variety of certified methods.

== Methods ==
=== Laboratory analysis ===
Traditionally, food companies would send food samples to laboratories for physical testing. Typical analyses include:

- moisture (water) by loss of mass at 102 °C
- protein by analysis of total nitrogen, either by Dumas or Kjeldahl methods
- total fat, traditionally by a solvent extraction, but often now by secondary methods such as NMR
- crude ash (total inorganic matter) by combustion at 550 °C
- estimated dietary fibre by various AOAC methods such as 985.29
- sodium (and thereby salt) either by flame photometry, AA or ICP-OES;
- total sugars, normally by a liquid chromatography technique, such as IC-HPAED or HPLC-RI;
- fatty acids by GC-FID.

Carbohydrates and energy values are normally calculated from these analytical values.

=== Software ===
Software is available as an alternative to laboratory nutrition analysis. This software typically utilizes a database of ingredients that have previously been laboratory tested. The user can input ingredient data by matching their ingredients to ingredients found in the database; the analysis can then be calculated.

=== Online nutrition analysis ===
In recent years, web-based nutrition analysis software services have become more popular. Online nutrition analysis allows users to access online databases and draw from certified ingredients to produce instant nutrition information.

=== Turnkey nutrition analysis services ===
Another emerging trend is the use of nutritional analysis services that do a complete analysis of any recipe by using their proprietary database. Users provide recipes, cooking methods and serving sizes. In turn, the service provides a complete nutritional analysis.

== Applications ==
In the United States, nutrition information is required on packaged retail foods in the form of nutrition facts panels as a result of food labeling regulations. In recent years, many restaurants have begun posting nutrition information as a result of both customer demand and menu-labeling laws.

=== Menu-labeling ===
The Patient Protection and Affordable Care Act, signed into law March 23, 2010, includes a provision that creates a national, uniform nutrition-disclosure standard for food service establishments.

The nutrition-disclosure provision requires chain restaurants, similar retail food establishments and vending machines with 20 or more locations to provide specific nutrition labeling information. Those establishments must post calories on menus, menu boards and drive-thru boards. Buffets, salad bars and other self-service items are also included and will be required to provide caloric information adjacent to the item.

Recently many state and local menu-labeling laws have been passed requiring restaurants to post nutrition information on menus and menu boards, or have it readily available upon customer request. Restaurants have had to perform nutrition analysis in order to generate nutrition information and conform to these laws. More recently national legislation has been introduced that would set a national standard for menu labeling, the most popular of which is the LEAN act.

=== Animal feed ===
The reported analysis of animal feed typically uses raw values from laboratory results, commonly listing the moisture content, crude fat, crude protein, crude ash, fibers, and net energy. Some nutritionally-important values such as chloride, calcium, phosphorus, zinc, and copper may also be reported.
