= Analyst (journal) =

- Discipline: Analytical chemistry
- Language: English
- Edited by: Melanie Bailey

Publication details
- Former name(s): The Analyst
- History: 1877–present
- Publisher: Royal Society of Chemistry (United Kingdom)
- Frequency: Biweekly
- Impact factor: 4.2 (2022)

Standard abbreviations
- ISO 4: Analyst

Indexing
- CODEN: ANALAO
- ISSN: 0003-2654 (print); 1364-5528 (web)
- OCLC no.: 01481074

Links
- Journal homepage

Analyst is a biweekly peer-reviewed scientific journal covering all aspects of analytical chemistry, bioanalysis, and detection science. It is published by the Royal Society of Chemistry and the editor-in-chief is Melanie Bailey (University of Surrey). The journal was established in 1877 by the Society for Analytical Chemistry.

== Abstracting and indexing ==
The journal is abstracted and indexed in MEDLINE and Analytical Abstracts. According to the Journal Citation Reports, the journal has a 2022 impact factor of 4.2.

== Analytical Communications ==
In 1999, the Royal Society of Chemistry closed the journal Analytical Communications because it felt that the material submitted to that journal would be best included in a new communications section of Analyst. Predecessor journals of Analytical Communications were Proceedings of the Society for Analytical Chemistry, 1964–1974; Proceedings of the Analytical Division of the Chemical Society, 1975–1979; Analytical Proceedings, 1980–1993; Analytical Proceedings including Analytical Communications, 1994–1995.
