= Food sampling =

Food safety check

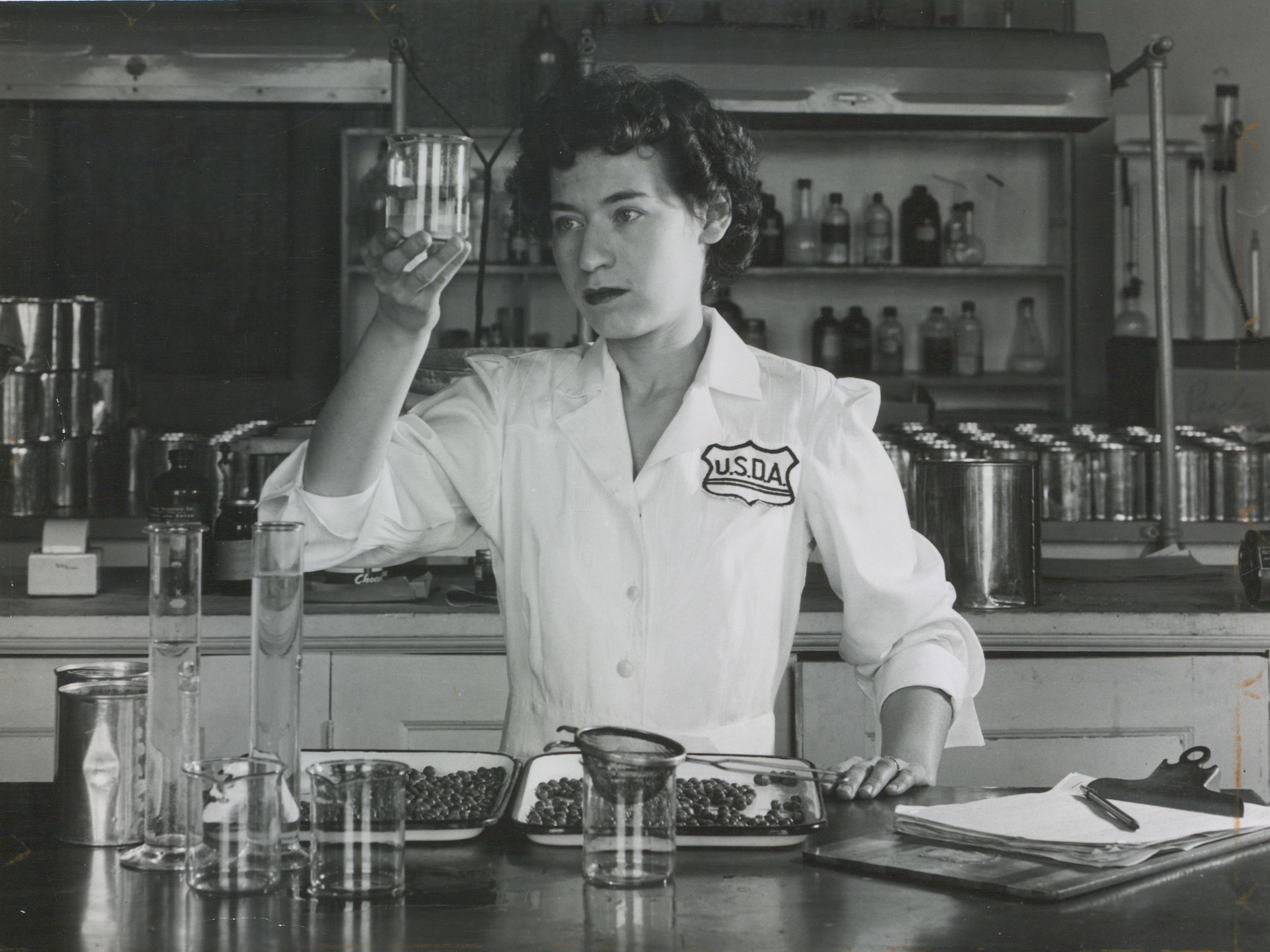
A food scientist considers canned peas

Food sampling is a process used to check that a food is safe and that it does not contain harmful contaminants, or that it contains only permitted additives at acceptable levels, or that it contains the right levels of key ingredients and its label declarations are correct, or to know the levels of nutrients present.

A food sample is carried out by subjecting the product to physical analysis. Analysis may be undertaken by or on behalf of a manufacturer regarding their own product, or for official food law enforcement or control purposes, or for research or public information.

To undertake any analysis, unless the whole amount of food to be considered is very small so that the food can be used for testing in its entirety, it is usually necessary for a portion of it to be taken (e.g. a small quantity from a full production batch, or a portion of what is on sale in a shop) – this process is known as food sampling.

In most cases with food to be analysed there are two levels of sampling – the first being selection of a portion from the whole, which is then submitted to a laboratory for testing, and the second being the laboratory's taking of the individual amounts necessary for individual tests that may be applied. It is the former that is 'food sampling': the latter is analytical laboratory 'sub-sampling', often relying upon initial homogenisation of the entire submitted sample.

Where it is intended that the results of any analysis to relate to the food as a whole it is crucially important that the sample is representative of that whole – and the results of any analysis can only be meaningful if the sampling is undertaken effectively. This is true whether the 'whole' is a manufacturer's entire production batch, or where it is a single item but too large to all be used for the test.

Factors relevant in considering the representativeness of a sample include the homogeneity of the food, the relative sizes of the sample to be taken and the whole, the potential degree of variation of the parameter(s) in question through the whole, and the significance and intended use of the analytical result.

== Sampling by manufacturers ==
Food manufacturers and producers would need to satisfy themselves that any sample taken for analysis is sufficiently representative of the food for the analytical result to be meaningful. This is true whether the data are to be used as the basis of labelling declarations, assurance of compliance with legislative or other standards, monitoring of production as part of HACCP (Hazard Analysis and Critical Control Points), or for routine quality control.

In the United Kingdom although various guidance is available, either from manufacturers' associations or from sources of standards such as British Standards Institution (such as British Standard BS6001), some of which may be relevant to certain food types. It is largely down to manufacturers to make their own evaluations of need and suitability. This must be translated into an assessment both of sample portion size and number, and the frequency of taking samples.

== Testing and methods of analysis ==
To ensure food safety and quality, some food samples which are perishable require certain tests and analyses. The following tests and analyses can be conducted:

- Food allergen testing
- Food chemical analysis
- Food contact tests
- Food contaminant testing
- Nutritional analysis and testing
- GMO testing
- Melamine contamination testing
- Microbiological tests
- Spiral plating for bacterial count
- Pesticide residue testing
- Veterinary drug residue testing
- PCR food testing

== Food law enforcement (UK) ==
In the United Kingdom, enforcement is under the Food Safety Act 1990. Food sampling is undertaken primarily by local authorities and port health authorities for submission to public analysts for analysis. Much of the legislation relates to food as supplied to a consumer, meaning that every portion of a size of perishable food and foods at risk as may be supplied to a consumer has to comply, so that in such cases the sample submitted for analysis could simply be an entire consumer-sized portion. There are exceptions, however, such as the sampling of nut products for the presence of aflatoxins, which stipulate a primary sample size related to the size of the consignment – with associated requirements for initial homogenisation to produce a smaller sample to be sent for analysis.

The Food Safety Act 1990 affords a right for defence analysis, and for referee analysis in case of disputed analytical results, by stipulating that except where to do so would prevent effective analysis the sample must be divided into three parts. The UK Food Standards Agency provides supplementary guidance to the enforcement authorities to assist with the sampling process and associated decisions by sampling officers.

There is no set frequency or rate for the sampling of food for law enforcement in the UK. Between the 1930s and 1990s there had been a guideline minimum rate for sampling for chemical analysis (not including samples for microbiological examination) of 2.5 samples per annum per 1000 head of population, however that was an arbitrary figure and more recent thinking suggested that the selection of a frequency for sampling should be based on risk. In this context risk includes all 'consumer protection' issues such as pecuniary disadvantage from substandard or counterfeit products, as well as risk to health. The Association of Public Analysts was commissioned by the Food Standards Agency to look into this, culminating in a scheme for Risk Based Sampling, though it has not yet been adopted by the enforcement authorities.

== In popular culture ==
In the 1993 Seinfeld episode "The Non-Fat Yogurt", frozen yogurt is sent to a laboratory for food sampling, where it is found to, in fact, contain fat.

== See also ==
- Food grading
