= Protein detection =

Method for clinical diagnosis, treatment, and biological research of proteins

Protein detection is used for clinical diagnosis, treatment and biological research. Protein detection evaluates the concentration and amount of different proteins in a particular specimen. There are different methods and techniques to detect protein in different organisms. Protein detection has demonstrated important implications for clinical diagnosis, treatment and biological research. Protein detection technique has been utilized to discover protein in different category food, such as soybean (bean), walnut (nut), and beef (meat). Protein detection method for different type food vary on the basis of property of food for bean, nut and meat. Protein detection has different application in different field.

== Protein detection in soybeans, walnuts, beef ==
Detection of Functional Modes in Protein

=== Purpose for protein detection in food ===
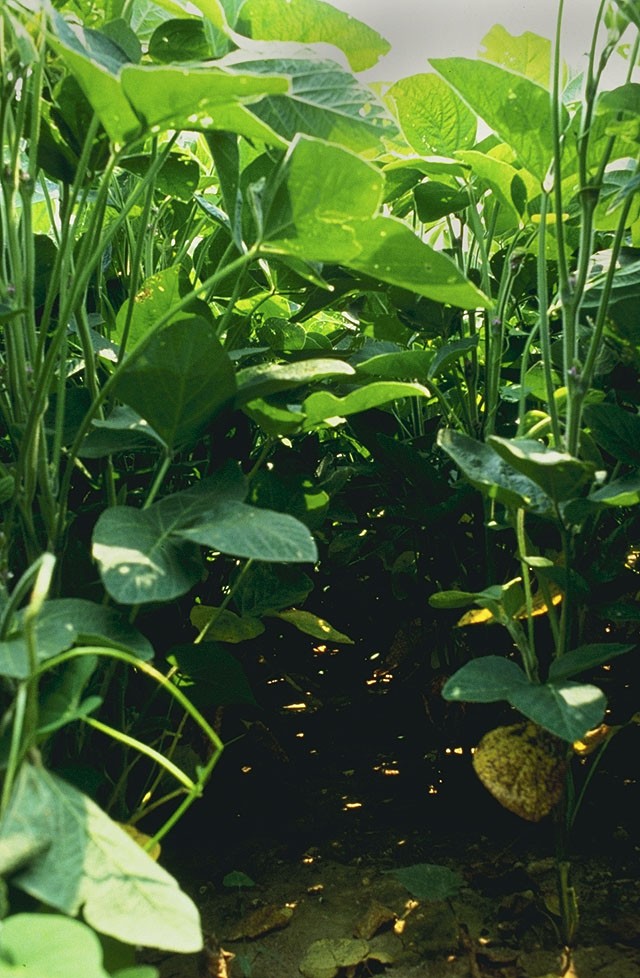
Soybean Plant

Allergies from food have been noted to become common disease nowadays. The food allergies in the clinical demonstration present different signs, for example mild symptoms from itching in the mouth and swelling of the lips to critical anaphylactic response result in fatal consequences. According to statistic, about 2% adults and 8% children are experiencing hypersensitivity from industrialized countries. In order to reduce potential threatening reactions for life, avoiding the consumption from these allergenic foods strictly is the valid therapy. Therefore, sufficient description in term of potentially allergenic ingredients existing in food products is crucial and indispensable which can be monitored through protein detection.

=== Rationale for protein detection in soybeans ===
The soybean has been consumed in processed foods all over the word because of its high nutrient and easy processing characteristic such as soybean milk, tofu, meat alternatives, and brewed soybean products. microorganisms is used in brewage process for brewed soybean products like miso, soy sauce, natto and tempeh. Allergenicity stays in brewed soybean products. In Asian countries, these brewed soybean products are popular and traditional. The amount of patients from soybean allergy and the nearly infinite uses for soybean have gone up in the past a couple of years.

==== Previous method for protein detection in soybeans ====
During the last 30 years, broad methods and techniques were experimented to discover soybean protein. These methods and techniques can be conveyed to lab environment easily. The original and traditional methods were designed and tested in molecular biology spectrum. Enzyme‐Linked Immunosorbent Assay technique containing high susceptibility and specificity is reliable method to investigate soybean proteins through applying a protein which can identify a foreign molecule. This has been evaluated as a vacuolar protein including a molecular block of 34 kDa. The ELISA illustrated sufficient repeatability and reproducibility in lab assessment. But it can not test protein in soybean existing in brewed soybean products. There are different studies to conduct experiments to assess soybean protein through ELISA. However, reproducibility, cross-reactivity and low repeatability make measurement difficult to be reliable in processed foods. These methods can not discover soybean protein staying in brewed soybean products.

==== Current method for protein detection in soybeans ====
Compared with previous method, a heating process is involved in current abstraction technique to investigate soybean protein existing in brewed products. Since the heating process can deactivate the microbial proteolytic enzymes, the current abstraction technique can be used to disclose soybean protein in brewed soybean products. The heating abstraction technique can be demonstrated as the following. To produce the good dispersibility for the specimen in the extraction buffer to carry out the heating process, 19mL of abstraction buffer is mixed with five glass beads in five millimeter diameter and 1 g of food homogenate. At 5, 15 and 60 min variable time, the mixture is abstracted under 25, 40, 60, 80 and 100 ° variable temperature through the heating in a water bath followed by every 5 minutes vortexing. Food abstractions generated through the previous and the current technique are centrifuged for 20 minutes at three thousand gram, then the supernatant is filtered off by a filter paper. The filtrate is gathered and applied for analysis immediately acting as the food specimen abstract. The calibration standard solutions needs to be prepared to disclose soybean proteins by using ELISA. A three hundred milligram soybean powder specimen is mixed with a twenty milliliter compound including 0.5 M NaCl, 0.5% SDS, 20 mM Tris-HCl (pH 7.5), and 2% 2-ME. The compound is then shaken at room temperature for 16 hours for abstraction. The abstract is centrifuged for 30 minutes at twenty thousand gram, then the supernatant is selected by a 0.8-μm microfilter paper. The protein substance from the initial abstract is inspected with a 2-D Quant Kit. The initial abstract is diluted to 50 ng/mL combined with 0.1% SDS, 0.1% 2-ME, 0.1 M PBS (pH 7.4), 0.1% BSA, and 0.1% Tween 20, and it is deposited for ELISA at 4 °C playing as the calibration standard solution.

==== Conclusion for current protein detection method in soybeans. ====
The detection limit for the ELISA is 1 μg/g and it can not assess soybean proteins existing in brewed soybean products due to degradation of the proteins in soybean through microbial proteolytic enzymes staying in the brewed products. The microbial proteolytic enzymes possibly restrain the detection of soybean protein storing in the brewed soybean products. The current abstraction technique can control protein degradation through the microbial proteolytic enzymes. The microbial proteolytic enzymes can be inhibited by heating, pH, and protease inhibitors in general. The variable heating temperatures and abstraction times are examined to decide the ideal heating temperature and time to control microbial proteolytic enzymes. The heating conditions showed to optimize the control of microbial proteolytic enzymes is 80 °C for 15 minutes. So the heating temperature for the abstraction is set to 80 °C and the time is set to 15 minutes for the current abstraction technique.

The current abstraction technique can restrain the degradation of soybean proteins through microbial proteolytic enzymes and can detect soybean protein in most brewed soybean products. The current abstraction technique combined with the heating is a useful and sensitive tool to discover soybean protein stored in processed foods and brewed soybean products. Without impacting microbial proteolytic enzymes, this method is appropriate to quantify soybean protein in processed foods. The proposed extraction and ELISA technique can be applied to control labeling systems for soybean ingredient through a trusty manner.

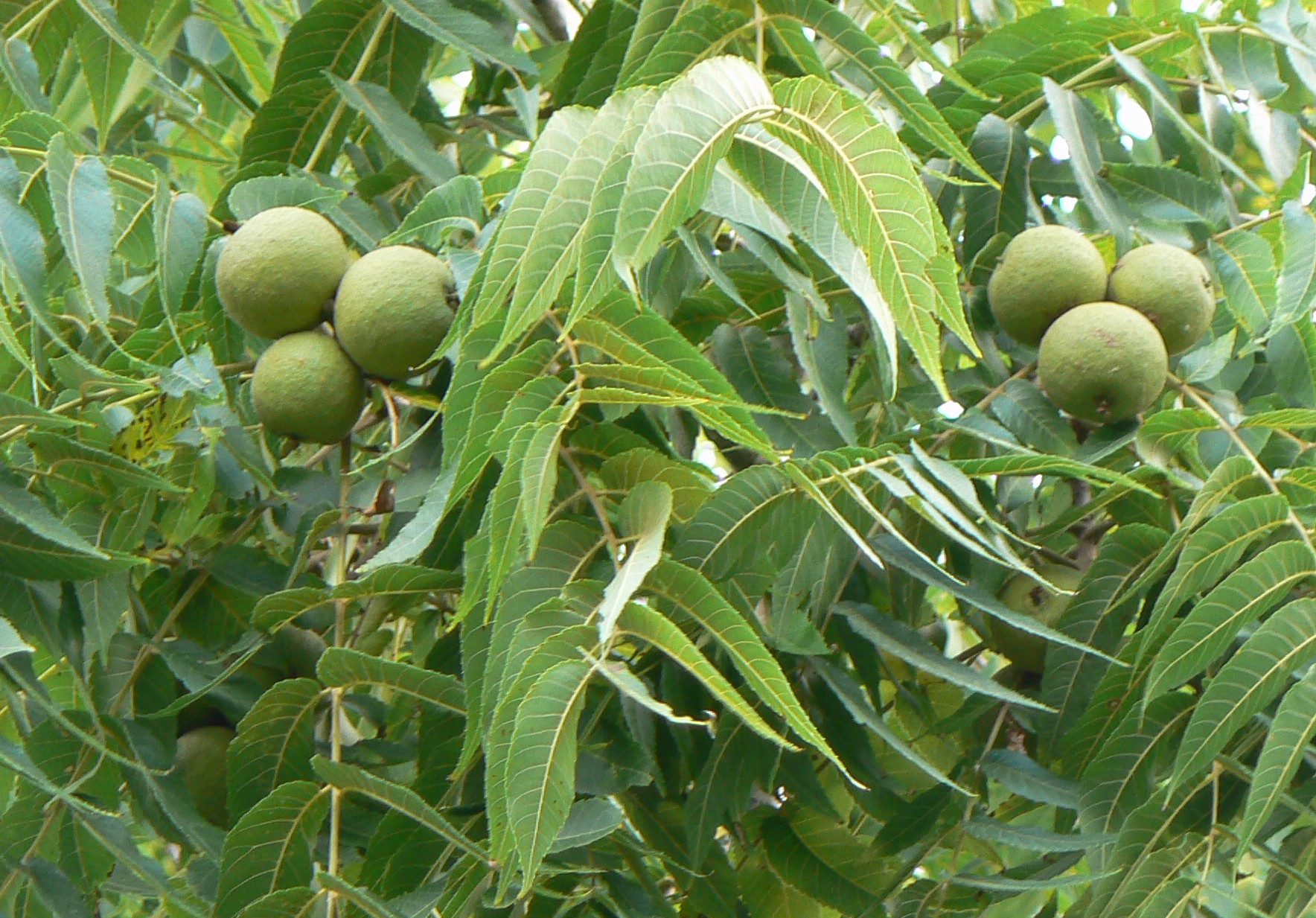
Black Walnut

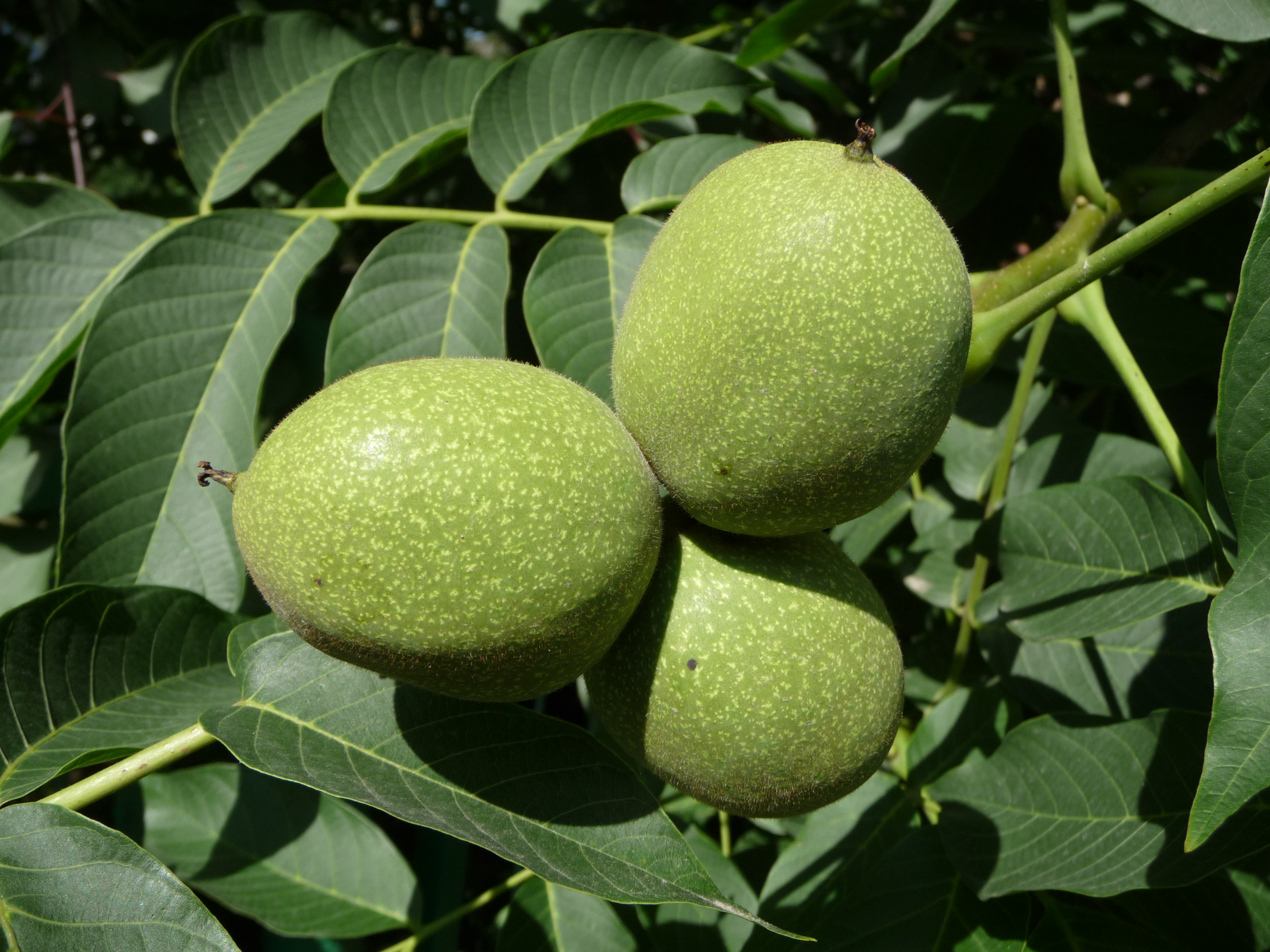
English Walnut

=== Rationale for protein detection in walnuts ===
English walnuts (Juglans regia) and black walnuts (Juglans nigra) are two main types of walnuts in the market across the world. Walnuts are utilized as a valuable ingredient due to favorable health attributes, sensory properties and consumer sensation. Shelled walnuts are broadly applied as ingredients in different foods such as salad, ice creams, bread and meat alternative. Walnut oil is introduced as a good source of mono- and polyunsaturated fatty acids and tocopherols. And it is adopted as a food ingredient in salad dressings particularly. Walnut hull extract is considered as a dietary supplement and a seasoning in the food industry. In addition, ground walnut shells can be used in industrial field as extenders, carriers, fillers and abrasives for example jet cleaners. Tree nuts are regarded as one of the most common allergenic foods around the world. Allergic reactions from tree nuts can be fierce and life threatening. Individuals with walnut allergies can have result in fatal and near-fatal reactions from the unintended ingestion of walnuts, other tree nuts or possibly contamination of food with the walnuts ingredient. To prevent walnut allergic reactions, the only effective way is to avoid walnuts in the diet. The appropriate labeling of processed foods with walnuts ingredient is critical to protect walnut-allergic consumers. There are a couple of circumstances cause undeclared walnut residues such as sharing equipment between walnut-containing and other formulations and undeclared walnuts in ingredients. The enzyme-linked immunosorbent assay (ELISA) can be used as the technique to detect walnuts residues with great sensitivity and specificity since walnuts allergic Individuals can have allergic reactions with low (milligram) amounts of walnuts. Several different techniques can be applied to discover walnut residues as well such as polymerase chain reaction (PCR) method and ELISA method on the basis of polyclonal antisera raised against a particular 2S albumin walnut protein.

==== Current method for protein detection in walnuts ====
The sandwich-type walnut ELISA is the current method used to detect protein in walnuts. The sandwich-type walnut ELISA can be applied as a critical analytical technique by food manufacturers and regulatory agencies for hygiene validation and the assessment of allergen control strategies.

===== Immunogen preparation =====
A mixture of several brands of English walnuts are used to produce the immunogen. The mixed walnuts need to be washed by deionized distilled water 6 times and air-dried. Portion of the walnuts are dry-roasted for 10 minutes at 270 ◦F. The roasted or raw walnuts are cleaved, frozen, and ground to a refined particle size through the blender. The ground roasted and ground raw walnuts are defatted and filtered. Then, the powdered raw or roasted walnuts are air-dried thoroughly. Both the defatted, powdered raw, and roasted walnuts can be utilized as immunogens. Protein concentrations of the defatted powdered immunogens are set through the Kjeldahl method with 46.4% raw defatted walnut and 34.9% roasted defatted walnut.

===== Polyclonal antibody production and titer determination =====
Polyclonal antibodies are generated in 1 sheep, 1 goat, and 3 New Zealand white rabbits with each immunogen. The initial subcutaneous injections are given to the 10 animals including 3 rabbits, 1 sheep, and 1 goat on multiple sites with the defatted powdered immunogen and Freunds Complete Adjuvant. Titer values of collected antisera are evaluated by a noncompetitive ELISA method with walnut protein from abstracts of the proper raw or roasted immunogen.

===== Cross-reactivity study and ELISA method =====
A variety of tree nuts, seeds, legumes, fruits and food ingredients are assessed for cross-reactivity in the walnut ELISA assay. The modified sandwich ELISA can be used to detect walnuts residues with sheep antiroasted walnut and rabbit antiroasted walnut antisera used as the capture and detector antibodies respectively.

==== Conclusion for current protein detection method in walnuts ====
Walnut residues can be disclosed at 1 ppm quantitation limit in a diversity of food such as ice cream, muffins, cookies and chocolate. The walnut ELISA can be conducted to detect possible walnut residues allergy in other foods from sharing equipment and to evaluate the sanitation procedures targeted on removal of walnut residues from shared equipment in the food industry.

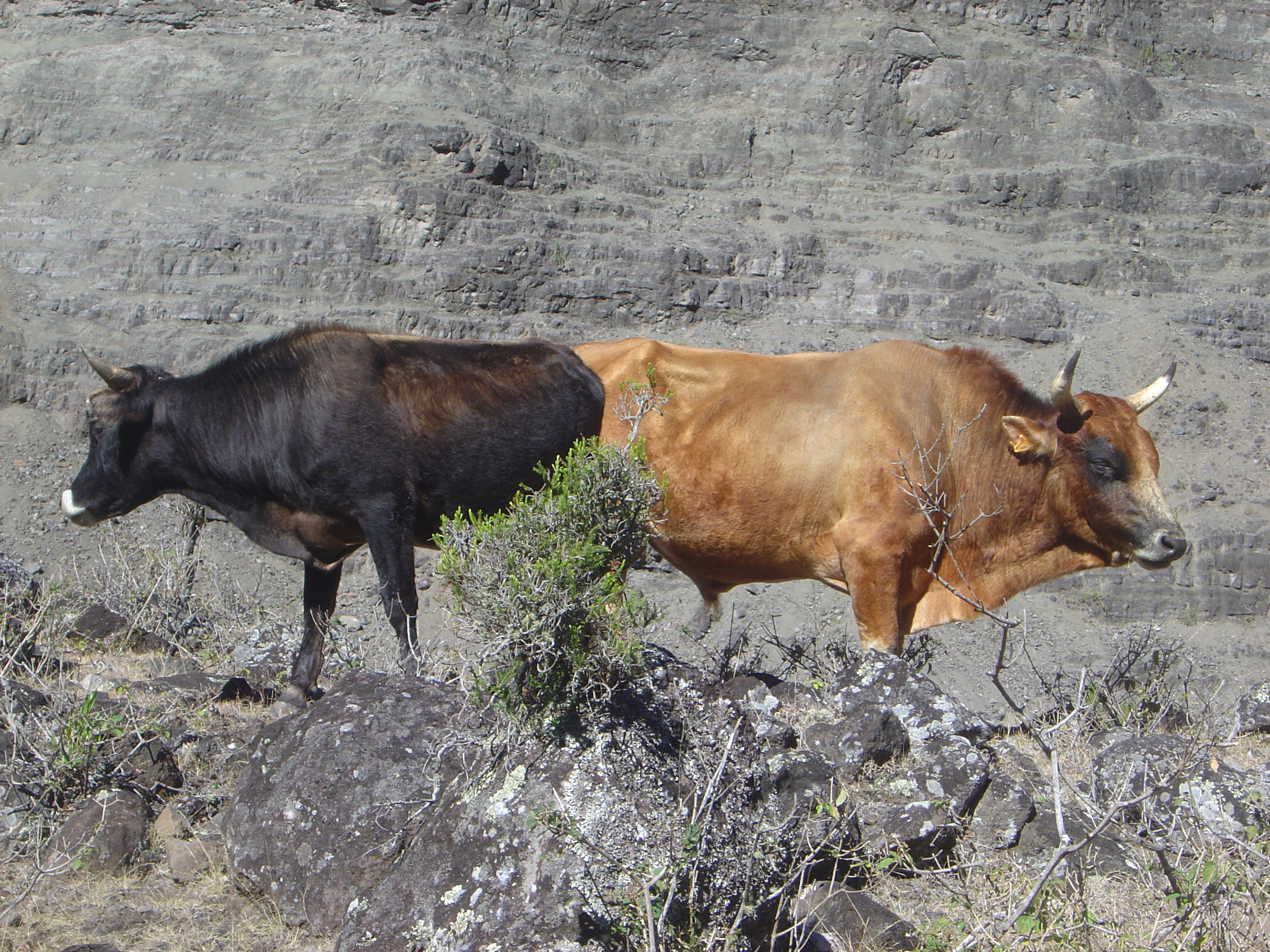
Cattle

=== Rationale for protein detection in beef ===
It has been reported that animal feedingstuffs containing processed animal protein (PAP) contaminated with prions have caused BSE infection of the cattle. Processed animal proteins (PAP) has been prohibited to apply as feed material for all farmed animals except fish meal currently. In addition, infections from consumption of undercooked raw beef has been declaimed to be an important pathogen for Enterohemorrhagic Escherichia coli O157:H7.

==== Method for protein detection in beef ====
For processed animal protein, the specific polymerase chain reaction (PCR) based procedure parallelled with microscopic method is utilized to detect processed animal protein (PAP) in feedingstuffs. The limit detection for PCR has been evaluated on 0.05% for beef, 0.1% for pork and 0.2% for poultry meat and bone meal. Microscopic method can disclose 66.13% doubtful samples of feedingstuffs. Combined the results from the use of the microscopic and PCR methods, it has been stated that the molecular biology methods can be executed as a supplementary method for PAP detection.

For undercooked raw beef, in order to make sure a safe beef supply, sensitive and quick detection techniques for E. coli O157:H7 are important in the meat industry. Three different techniques can be used in raw ground beef: the VIDAS ultraperformance E. coli test (ECPT UP), a noncommercial real-time (RT) PCR method and the U.S. Department of Agriculture, Food Safety and Inspection Service (USDA-FSIS) reference method to detect E. coli O157:H7. 25 g of individual raw beef samples and 375 g of raw beef composites can be examined for optimal enrichment times and the efficacy of testing. 6 hours of enrichment is sufficient for both the VIDAS ECPT UP and RT-PCR methods for 25 g samples of each type of raw ground beef, but 24 hours of enrichment is acquired for 375 g samples, Both the VIDAS ECPT UP and RT-PCR methods can generate similar results with those gained from the USDA-FSIS reference method after 18 to 24 hours of enrichment. Low levels of E. coli O157:H7 in 25 g of various types of raw ground beef can be disclosed through these methods, E. coli O157:H7 in composite raw ground beef up to 375 g can be detected as well.

=== Implication from protein detection ===
Protein detection in cells from the human rectal mucous membrane can imply colorectal disease such as colon tumours, inflammatory bowel disease. Protein detection based on antibody microarrays can implicate life signature for example organics and biochemical compounds in the Solar System in astrobiology field. Protein detection can monitor soybean protein labeling system in processed foods to protect consumers in a reliable way. The labeling for soybean protein declaimed by protein detection has indicated to be the most important solution. Detailed labeling description for the soybean ingredients in refined foods is required to protect the consumer.
