= Portmahomack =

Village in Scotland

Coordinates: 57.83695°N 3.82746°W

Portmahomack: Scottish Gaelic: Port Mo Chalmaig
- Location within the Ross and Cromarty area
- OS grid reference: NH915845
- Civil parish: Tarbat
- Council area: Highland
- Country: Scotland
- Sovereign state: United Kingdom
- Post town: Tain
- Postcode district: IV20
- Police: Scotland
- Fire: Scottish
- Ambulance: Scottish

Portmahomack (Scottish Gaelic: Port Mo Chalmaig; 'Haven of My [i.e. 'Saint'] Colmóc') is a small fishing village in Easter Ross, Scotland. It is situated in the Tarbat Peninsula in the parish of Tarbat.

Tarbat Ness Lighthouse is about three miles (five kilometres) from the village at the end of the Tarbat Peninsula. Ballone Castle lies about one mile (1.5 kilometres) from the village.

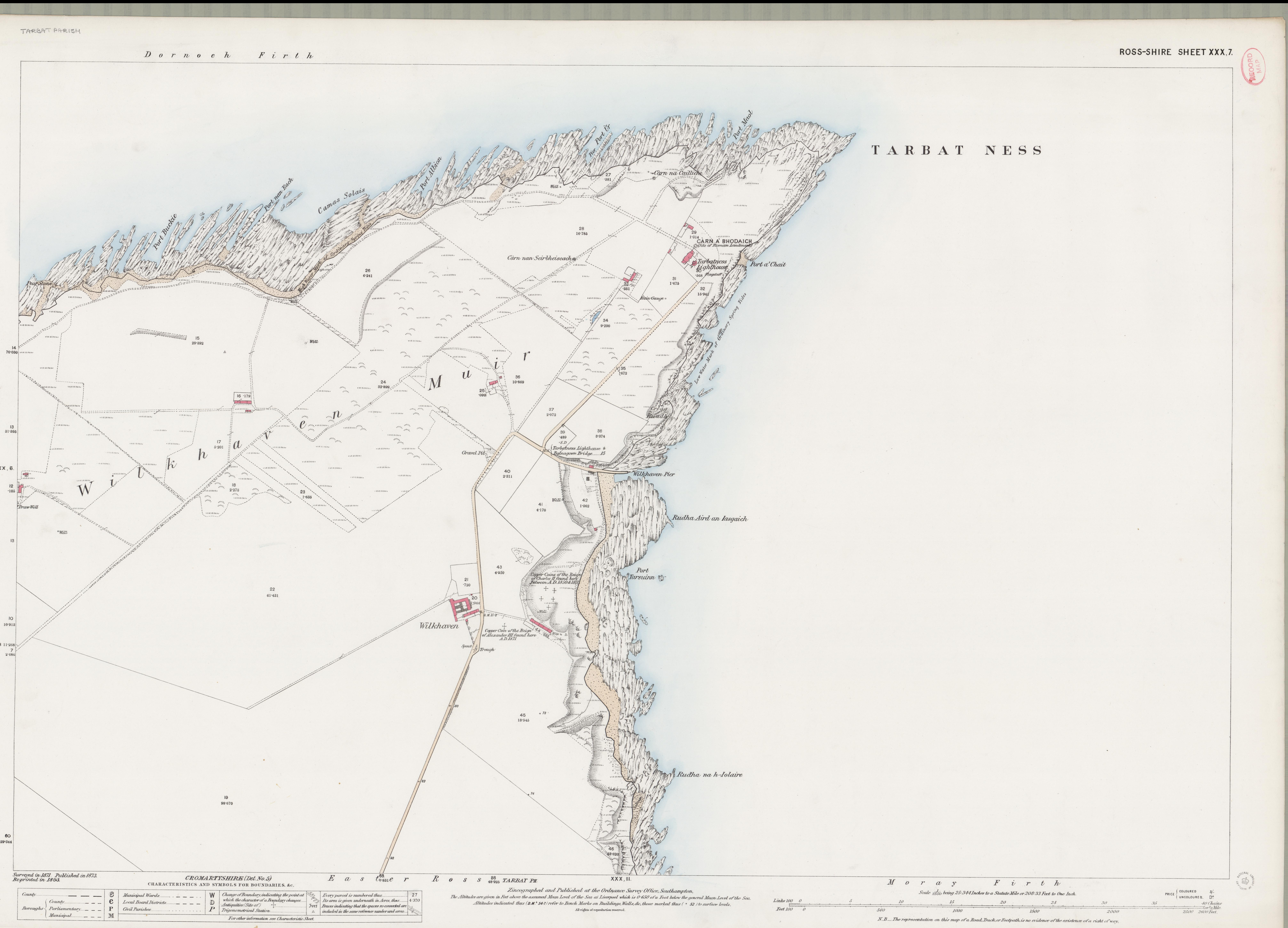
Old map of the Lighthouse showing the "Roman landmark" near Port a' Chait

There is evidence of early settlement, and the area seems to have been the site of significant activity during the time of the Picts, the Romans (possible Roman foundations of the lighthouse that were later identified in the Middle Ages as a "Roman landmark" near Port a' Chait that is now called "Port a Chaistell".), early Christianity and the Vikings. The village is situated on a sandy bay and has a small harbour designed by Thomas Telford: it shares with Hunstanton the unusual distinction of being on the east coast but facing west. Portmahomack lies inside the Moray Firth Special Area of Conservation with the associated dolphin and whale watching activity.

The village has a primary school, golf course, hotel, a number of places to eat and a shop with a sub-post office. The nearest rail access is at Fearn railway station and the nearest commercial airport is at Inverness Airport. The nearest town with full services is Tain lying approximately 10 miles (16 kilometres) west. Tain also has rail access. The hamlet of Rockfield is nearby and is accessed via the village of Portmahomack.

== History ==
Situated nine miles (fourteen kilometres) east of Tain on the northern coast of the Tarbat Peninsula, Portmahomack has long been known to be on the site of early settlements. The earliest evidence of habitation is provided by shell middens pointing to settlement as early as one or two thousand years BCE.

There are the remains of an Iron Age broch a little to the west of the village. Finds of elaborate early Christian carved stones dating to the 8th–9th centuries (including one with an inscription), in and around the churchyard, had long suggested that Portmahomack was the site of an important early church in the sixth-seventh century.

=== Possible Roman camp ===
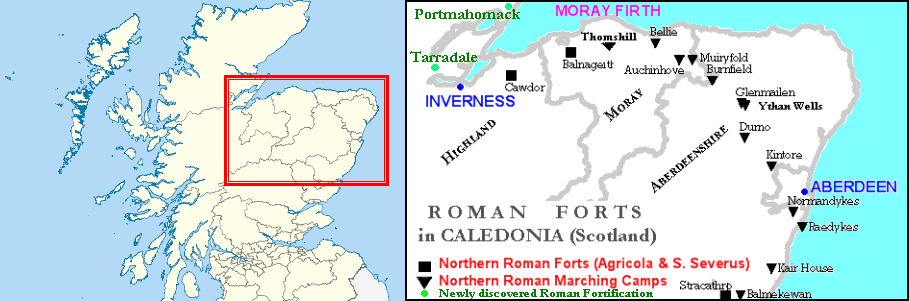
Roman forts in the vicinity of the Moray Firth, Scotland

After the description by a minister in 1822 of a structure, near Port a' Chaistell, as "a beautiful square fortification of about 100 paces of a side," the archaeologist O. G. S. Crawford speculated in 1949 that the site might have been a Roman camp, although he did not ever visit the site and no trace of a Roman settlement was found during a later visit.

It had apparently been defaced by 1872 during land reclamation, but in Crawford's opinion there may be some traces of the Roman camp still visible or to be discovered.

Furthermore it has been suggested (by Montesanti) that the supposed camp was visited by emperor Septimius Severus, based on remarks made by the Roman historian Cassius Dio: "Severus did not desist until he approached the extremity of the island (of Britain)".

=== Monastery ===
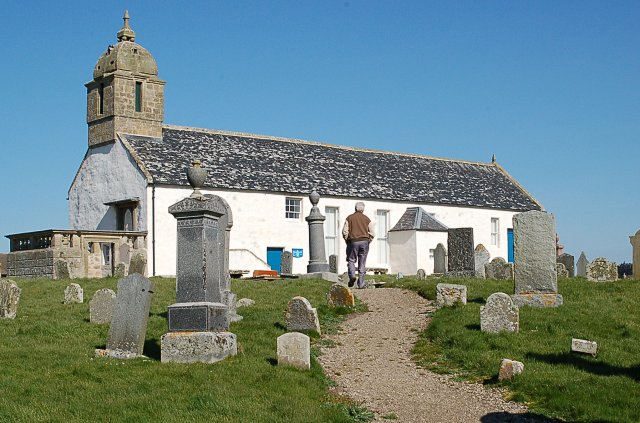
Tarbat Old Church

Portmahomack is the site of the first confirmed Pictish monastery and the subject between 1994 and 2007 of one of the largest archaeological investigations in Scotland directed by Martin Carver (b. 1941). The fields surrounding the redundant St Colman's church were the focus of the 13-year investigation. What the archaeologists uncovered were: an early medieval enclosure ditch, burial ground, remnants of a stone church, and carved stone fragments in the Pictish style.

The monastery began around 550 AD and was destroyed by fire in about 800 AD. It had a burial ground with cist and head-support burials, a stone church, at least four monumental stone crosses and workshops making church plate and early Christian books. The making of vellum in an early medieval site was detected for the first time here by Cecily Spall of FAS Ltd.

Over two hundred pieces of sculpture have been found, some of it broken up in a layer of burning suggesting that the monastic buildings were violently destroyed, possibly in a Viking raid, about the year 800. The Book of Kells contains display capitals in a style similar to the sculptures, suggesting according to the scholar Victoria Whitworth that it may derive from the Portmahomack monastery, not Iona.

The present restored building, adapted to house a museum after lying empty for a number of years, has been shown by archaeological investigation to be itself a monument of great interest, of multi-phase construction, the oldest part (the east wall of the crypt) having been built as early as the 9th century. The museum and visitor centre in the remodeled parish church is managed by the Tarbat Historic Trust.

Recent research on the ancient trench around the local monastery found organic samples in the date range from 140 AD to 590 AD. The area enclosed by the ditch may have been a "settlement, craft-working centre and/or hub of a Pictish community", connected to the possible Roman fortification in Port a Chaistell.

=== Local battles ===
The Battle of Tarbat Ness was a land battle fought (c 1030–1040) between Thorfinn the Mighty, Earl (Jarl) of Caithness and the King of Scotland.

In the Battle of Tarbat in the 1480s, a raiding party from the Clan Mackay of Strathnaver were cornered in the Tarbat church by the Clan Ross, who killed many of them before setting fire to the church.

=== Fishing and shipping ===
During the 17th century, cod, skate ling, halibut, lobsters and turbot were fished in great quantities until the end of the 18th century. Over 100 ships are reported to have exported grain from the harbor. Herring exports peaked between 1850 and 1890, and brought increased employment and prosperity to the region. At the end of the 19th century, the growing number of steam trawlers in the area led to the decline of the herring industry. The construction of the Balintore harbour, south of Portmahomack, also contributed to reduced shipping activity at Portmahomack. The export of grain from the harbor ended during the 1930s.

The Annual Reports of the Fishery Board for Scotland provide an insight into the decline of fishing from Rockfield and Portmahomack in the years before the First World War.

Fishery Statistics

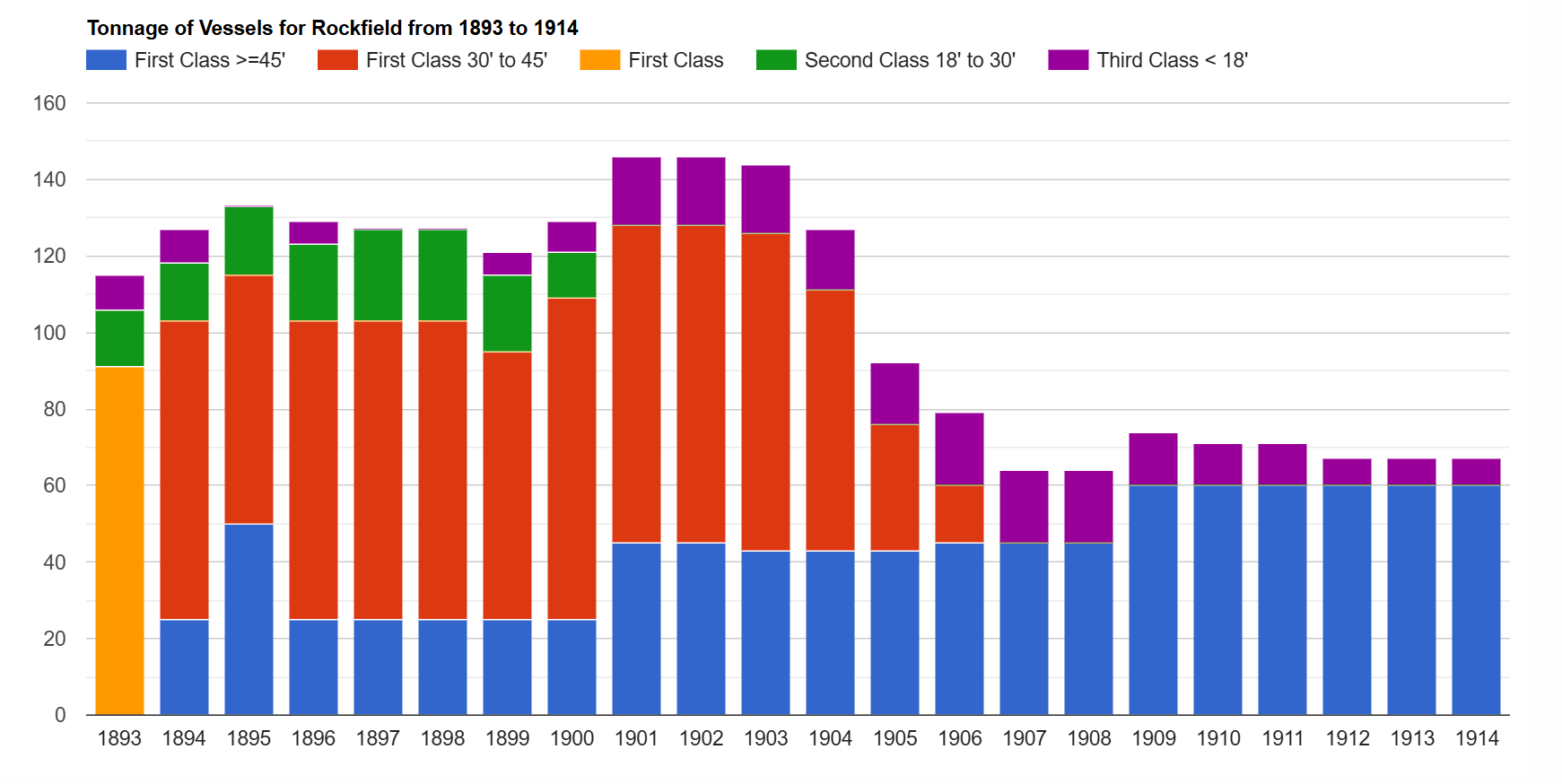
Rockfield tonnage of vessels

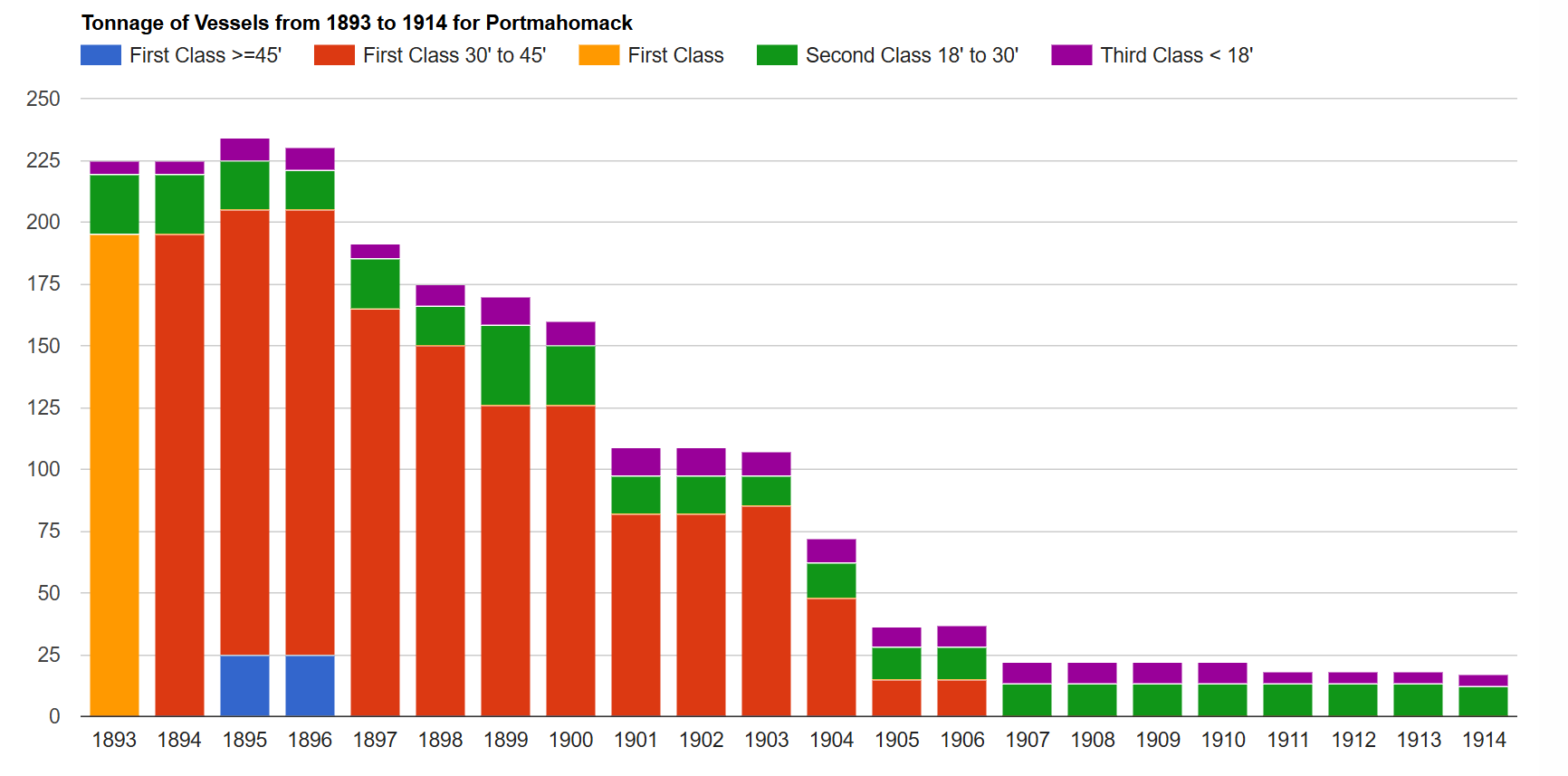
Portmahomack tonnage of vessels

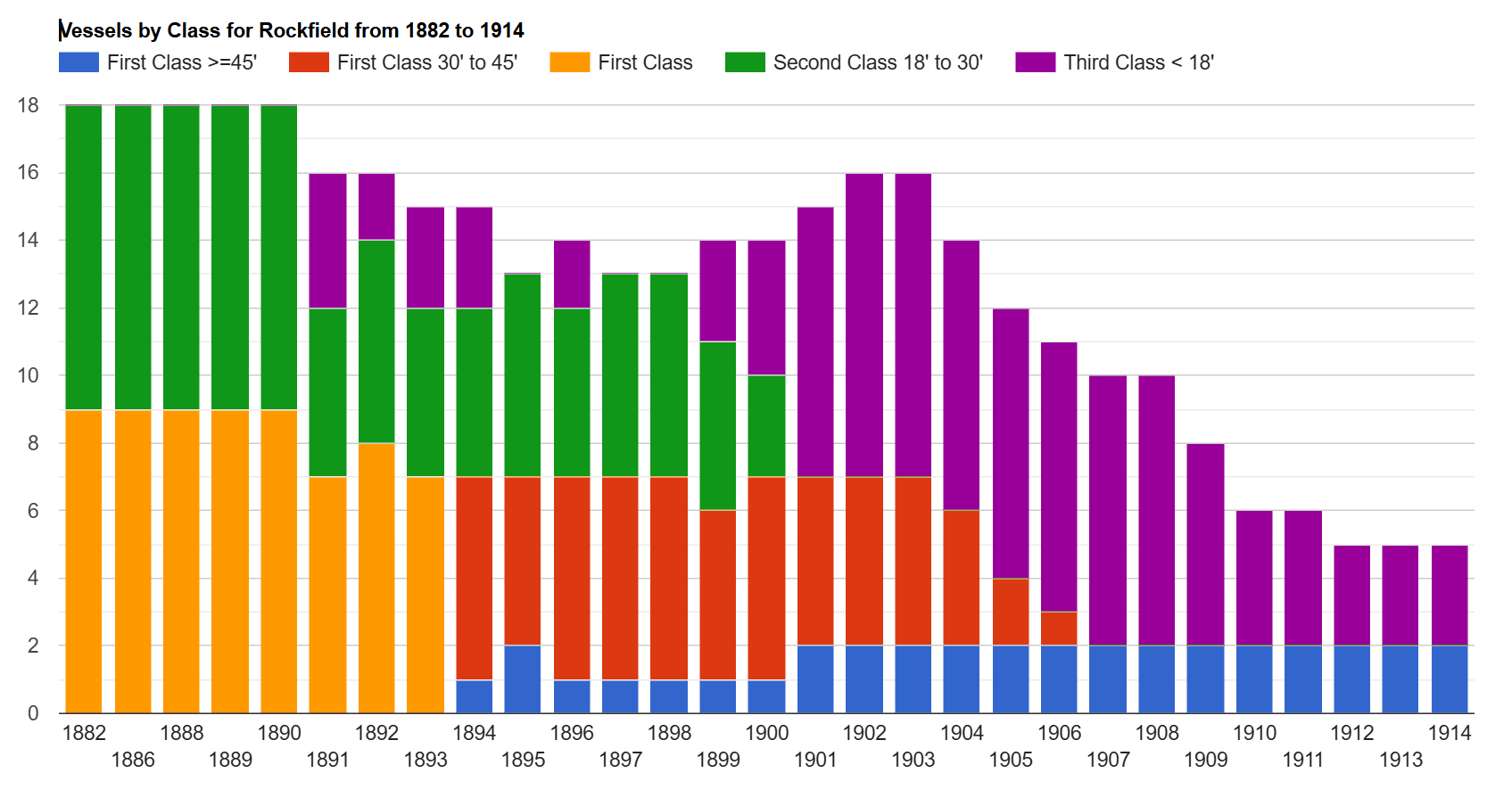
Rockfield vessels by class

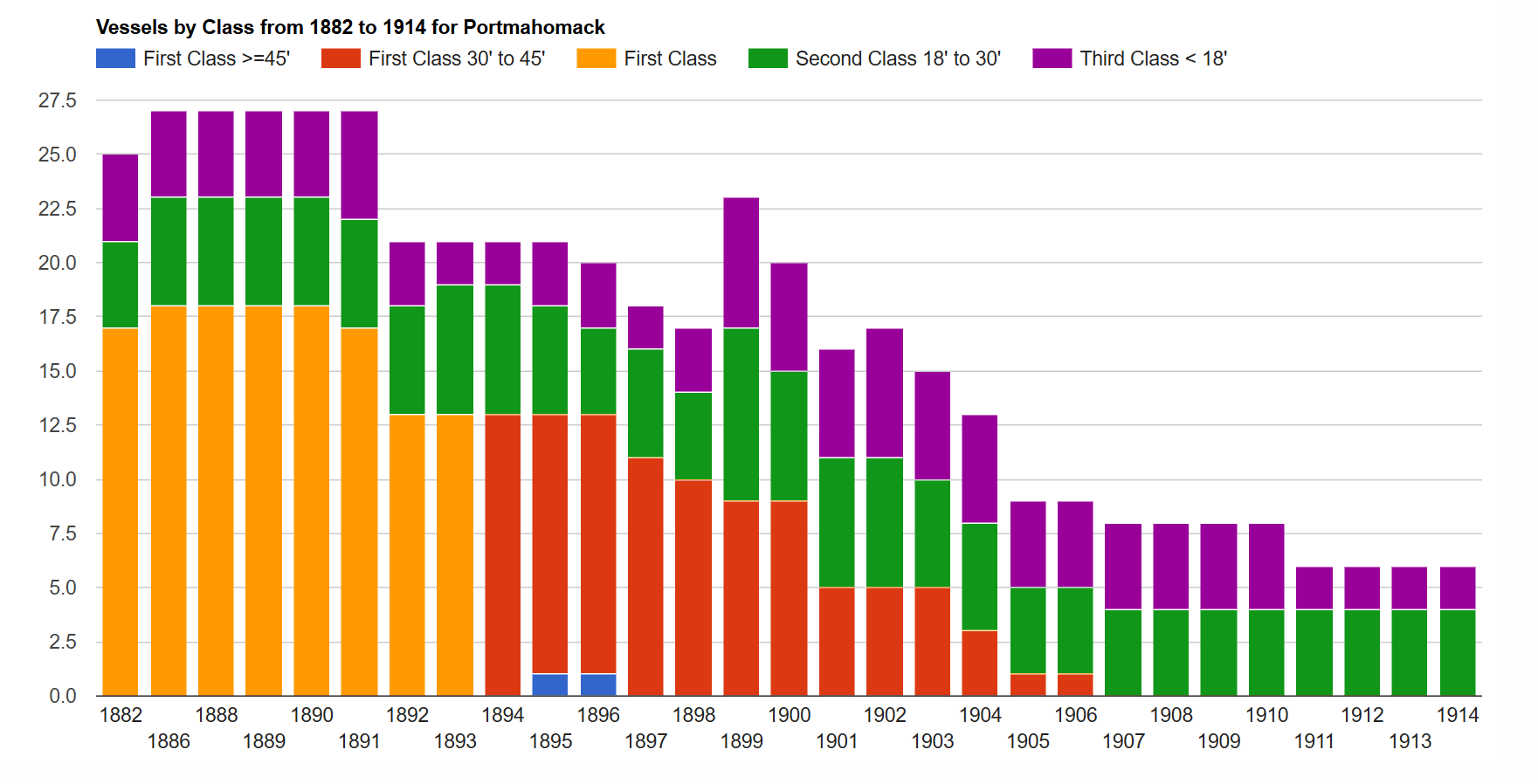
Portmahomack vessels by class

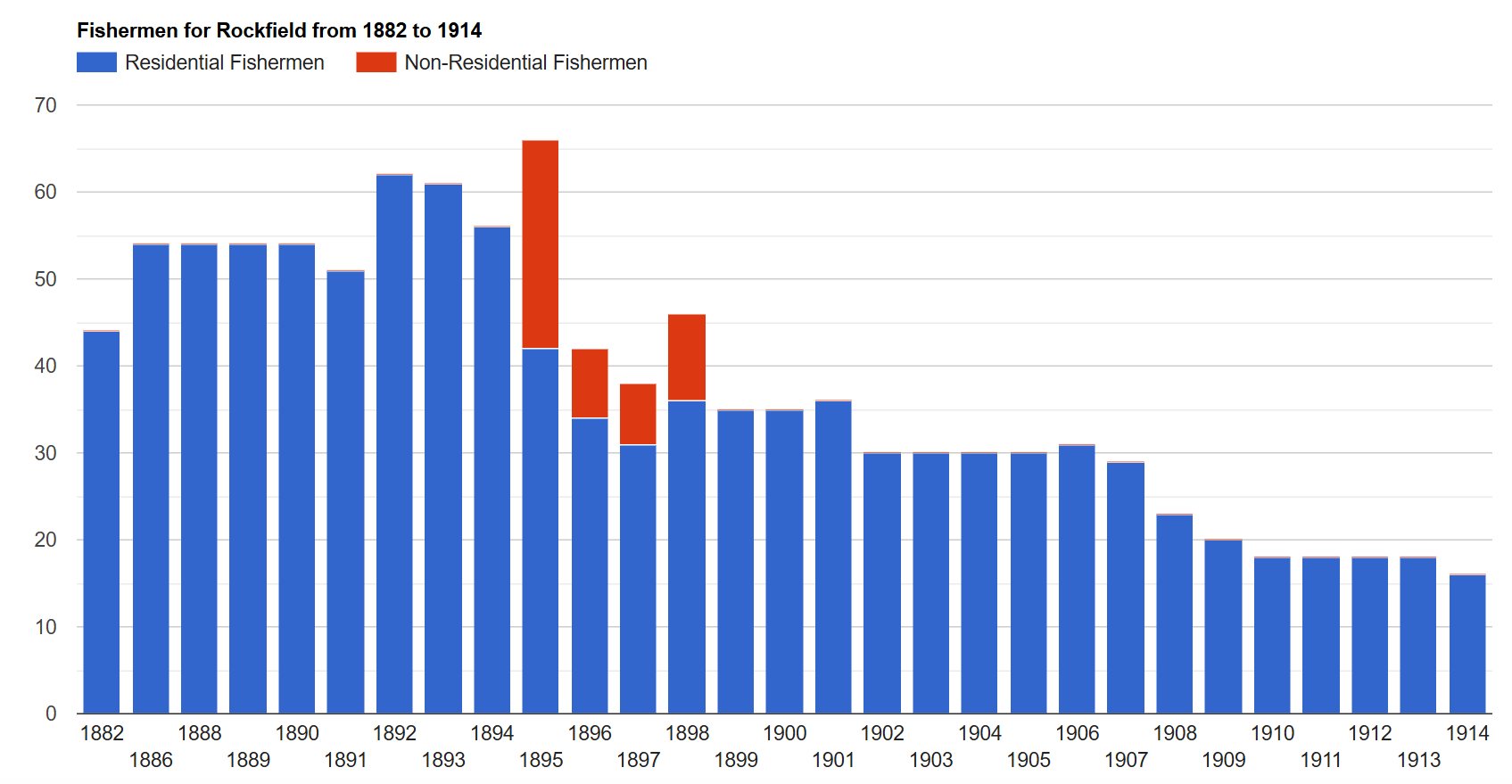
Rockfield fishermen

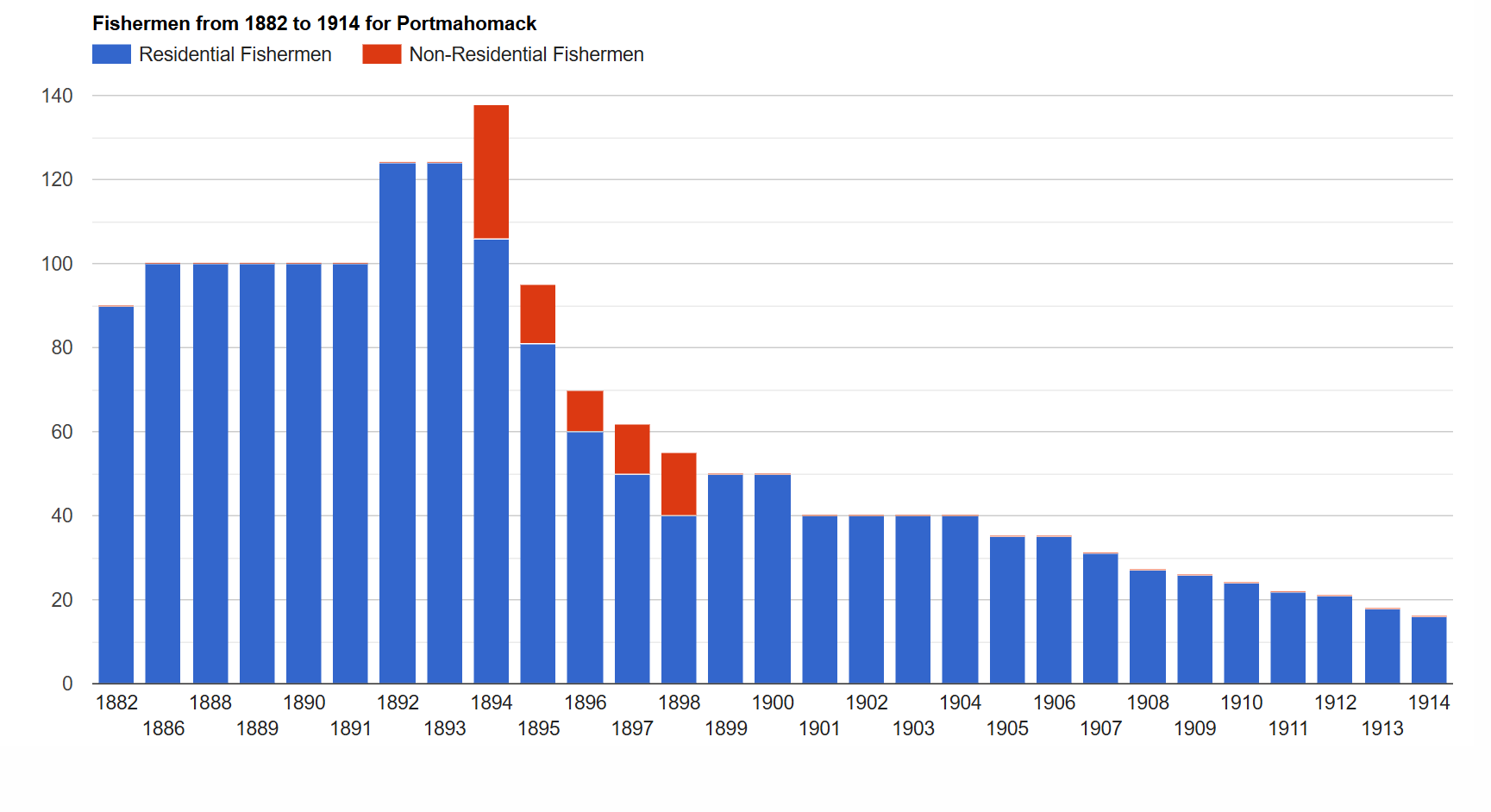
Portmahomack fishermen

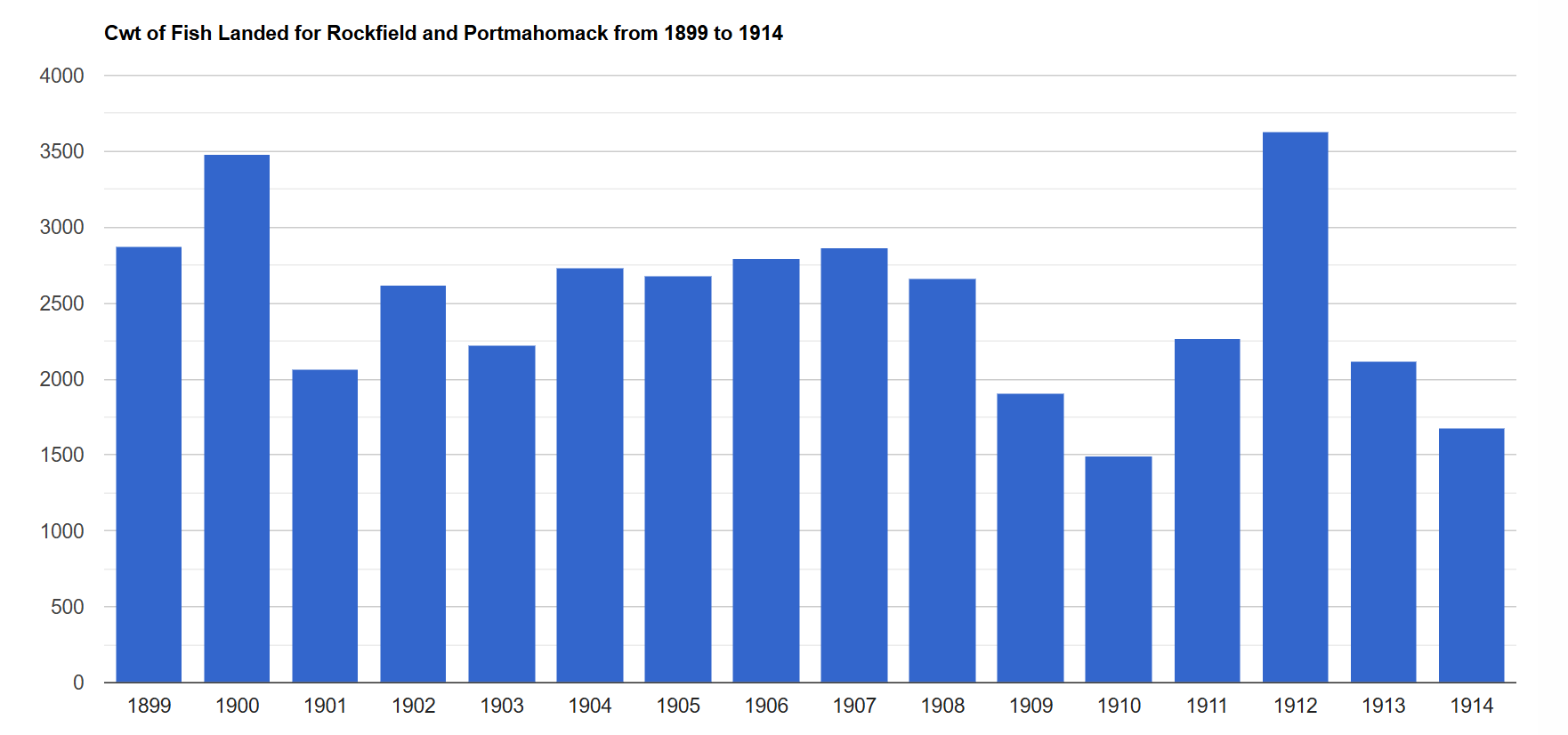
Cwt of fish landed

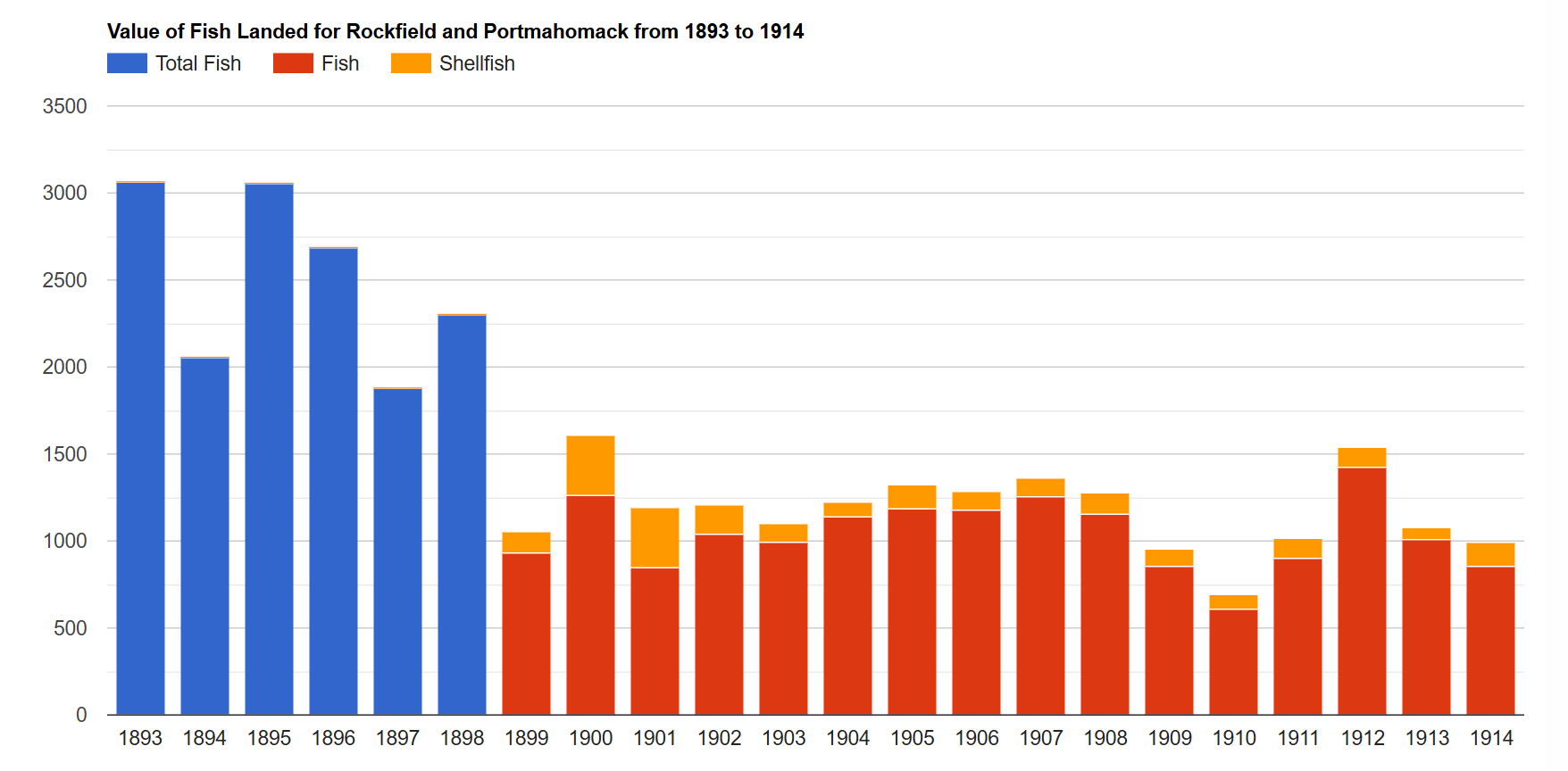
Value (£) of fish landed

The report for 1907 states that "a few unsuccessful attempts were made by three Rockfield crews at herring fishing, but apart from that, small line was the only fishery engaged in at these two places. The earnings of a number of the men were supplmented at herring fishing on other parts of the coast. The local fisheries show sign of decay". In 1908 "three crews fished from Wick at the summer herring fishing."

== Tourist site ==
Today, Portmahomack is a tourist destination with its traditional harbour, swimming beach, golf, dolphin watching, fishing and other watersports. It has a permanent population of between 500 and 600 residents. In the former parish church the Tarbat Discovery Centre, designed by exhibition consultants Higgins Gardner & Partners, houses displays on local history, and many of the finds from several seasons of excavation within the church itself, and in the fields surrounding the churchyard. It also houses the Peter Fraser Archive of memorabilia relating to Peter Fraser, wartime prime minister of New Zealand, who was born and grew up in Hill of Fearn, seven miles (eleven kilometres) distant from Portmahomack.

Notable among these are a large collection of fragments of Pictish stone sculpture, many of them superbly carved with figures of ecclesiastics, fantastic and realistic animals, 'Celtic' interlace and key-pattern, and other motifs. The large elaborate late seventeenth- or early eighteenth-century bell-turret on the west gable of the church is an unusual and distinctive feature.

Some important Pictish carved stones from Portmahomack are on display in the Museum of Scotland, Edinburgh with replicas in the Tarbat Discovery Centre.

Two other important historic buildings in Portmahomack are adjoining 'girnals' (storehouses), built in the late 17th century and 1779, overlooking the harbour (restored as housing). The former is one of the oldest such buildings to survive in Scotland. The village also features a number of attractive 18th/early 19th century houses lining the shore.

== Notable people ==
Portmahomack was a favourite holiday location for Lord Reith (John Reith, 1st Baron Reith (1889-1971)), Director-General of the BBC, who holidayed in the Blue House, still aptly painted blue and located on the seafront, near the harbour.

The murder-mystery writer Anne Perry (1938-2023) lived adjacent to the village for a number of years.

John Shepherd-Barron (1925-2010), the inventor of the ATM (Auto-Teller Machine), lived in the nearby community of Geanies until his death in 2010.

Professor Thomas Summers West (1927-2010), was a famous son of the Village with an Exhibition held in his name at the Tarbat Discovery Centre in 2011.

== See also ==
- Battle of Tarbat
- Portmahomack sculpture fragments
- Tarbat Ness Lighthouse
- Ballone Castle

== Gallery ==
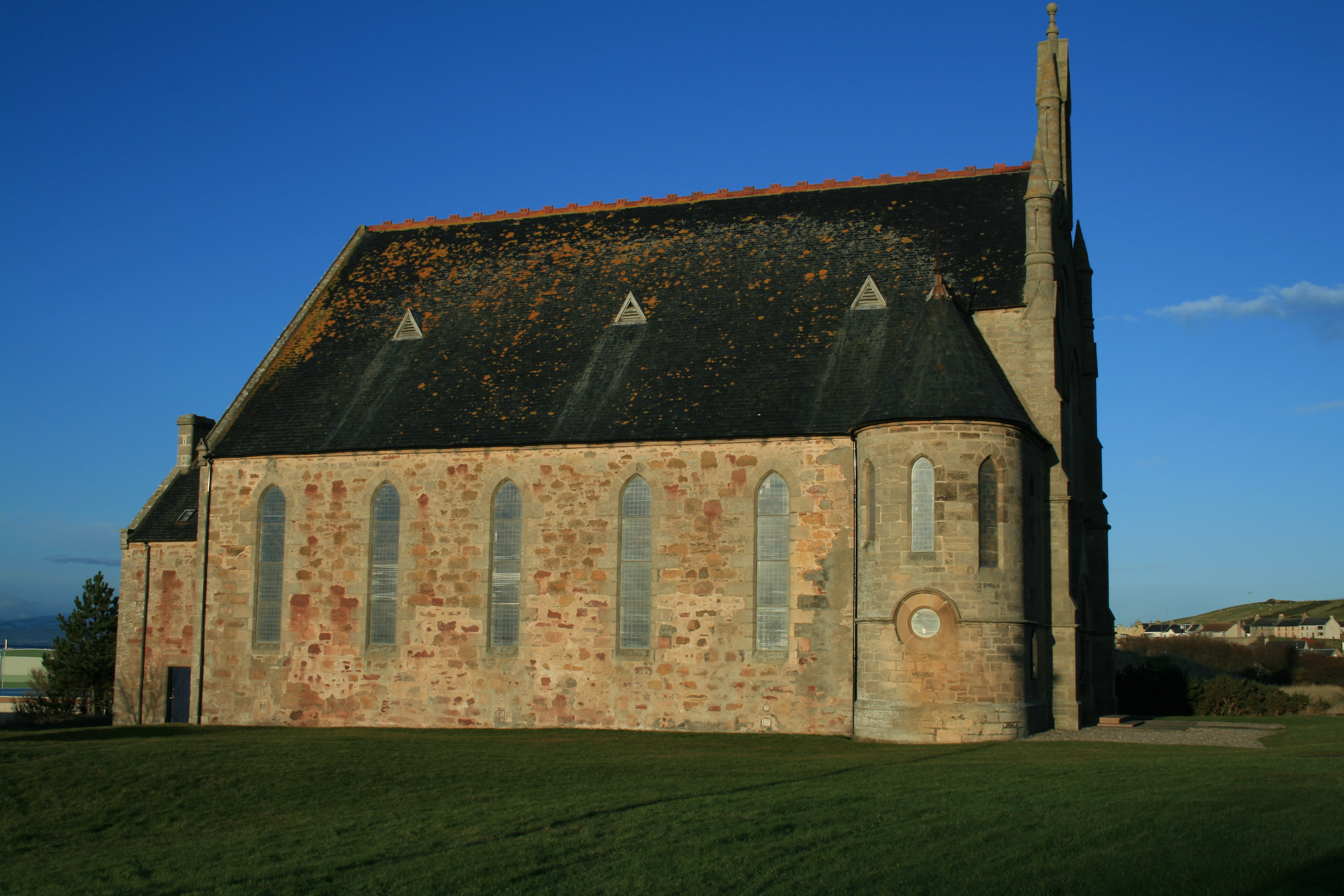
Portmahomack Church

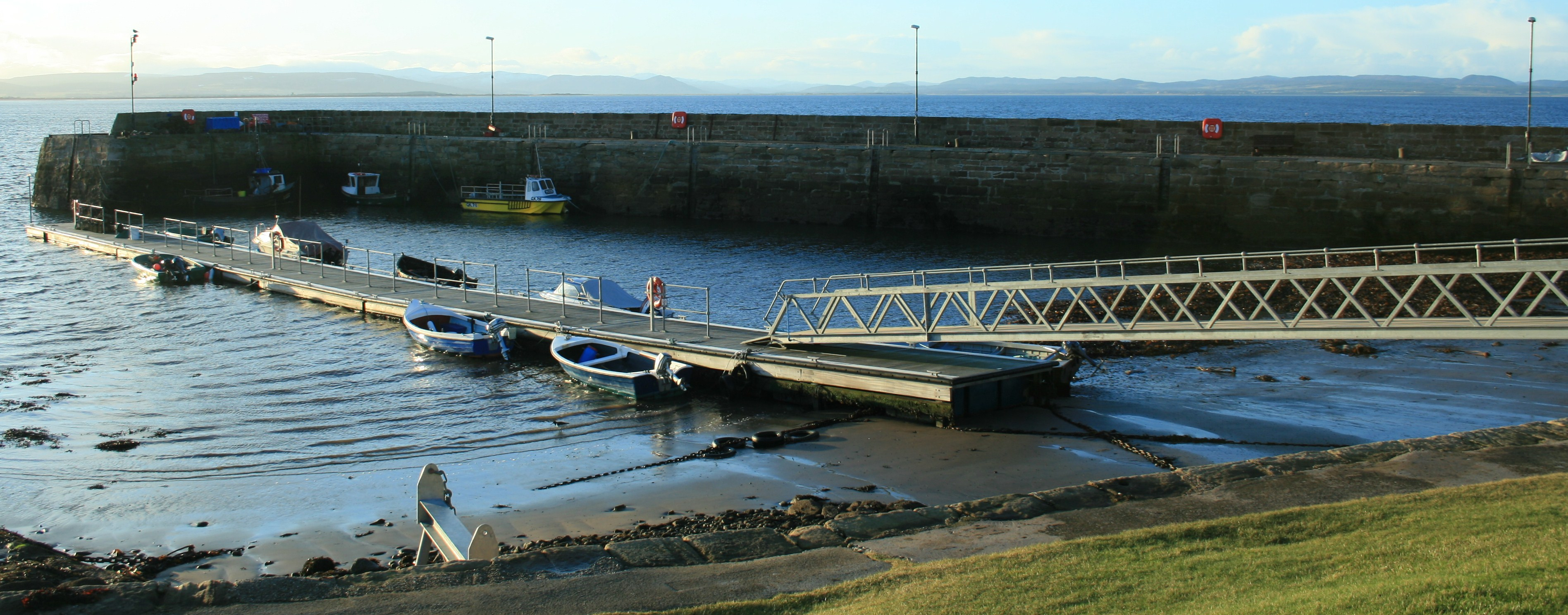
Portmahomack Harbour

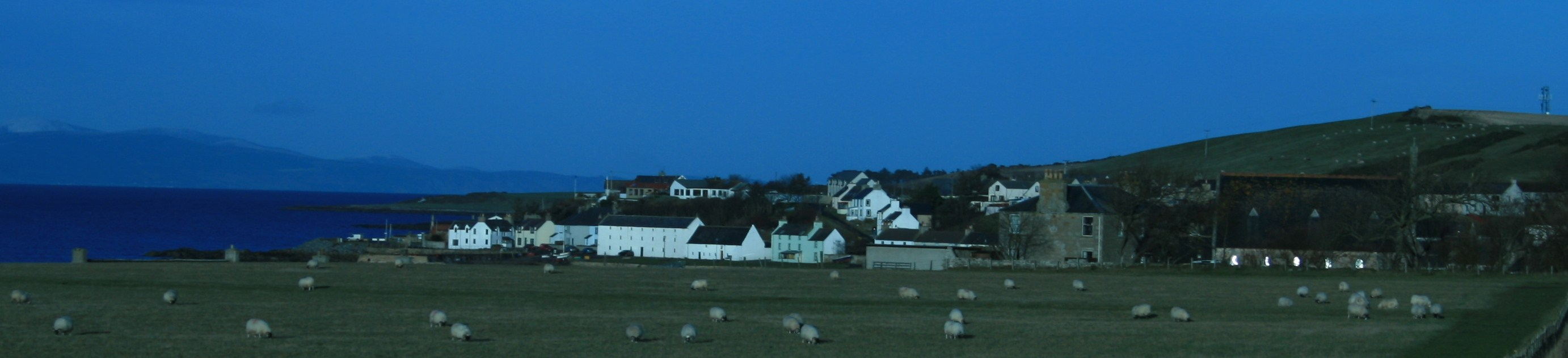
Portmahomack Village

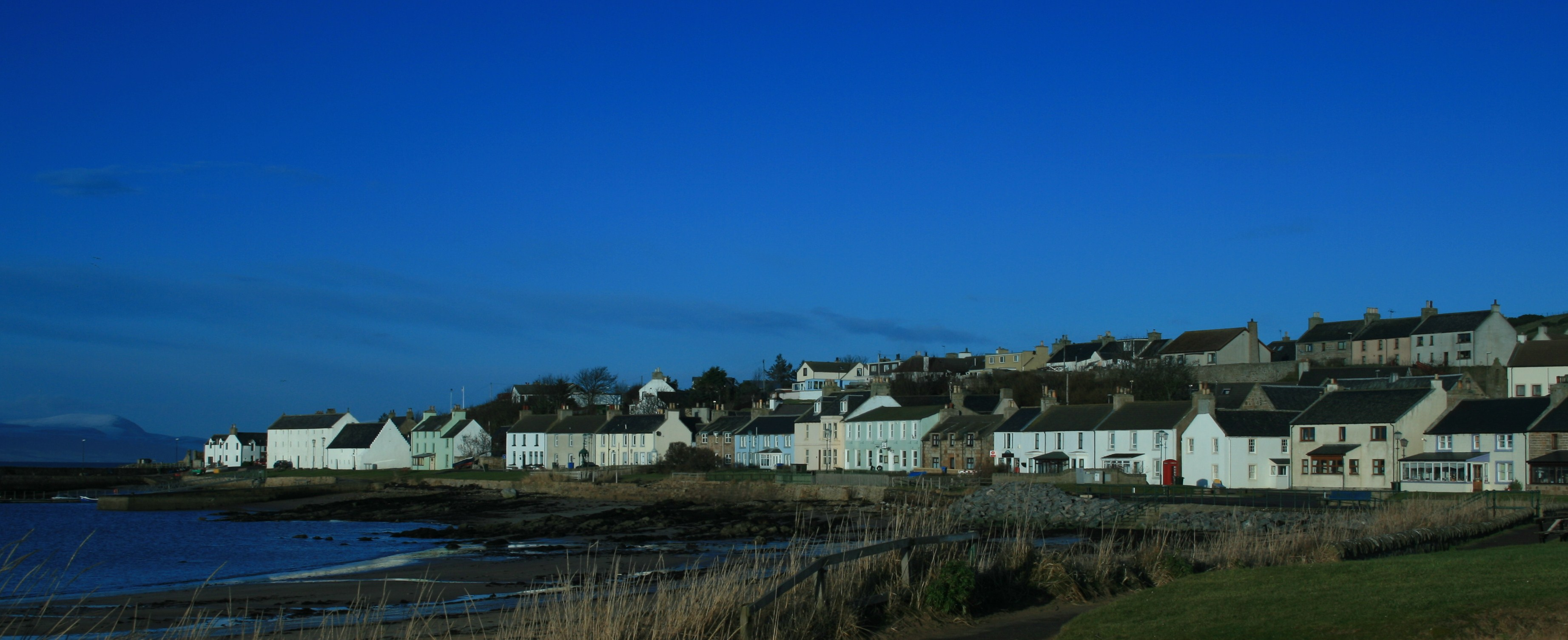
Portmahomack Village

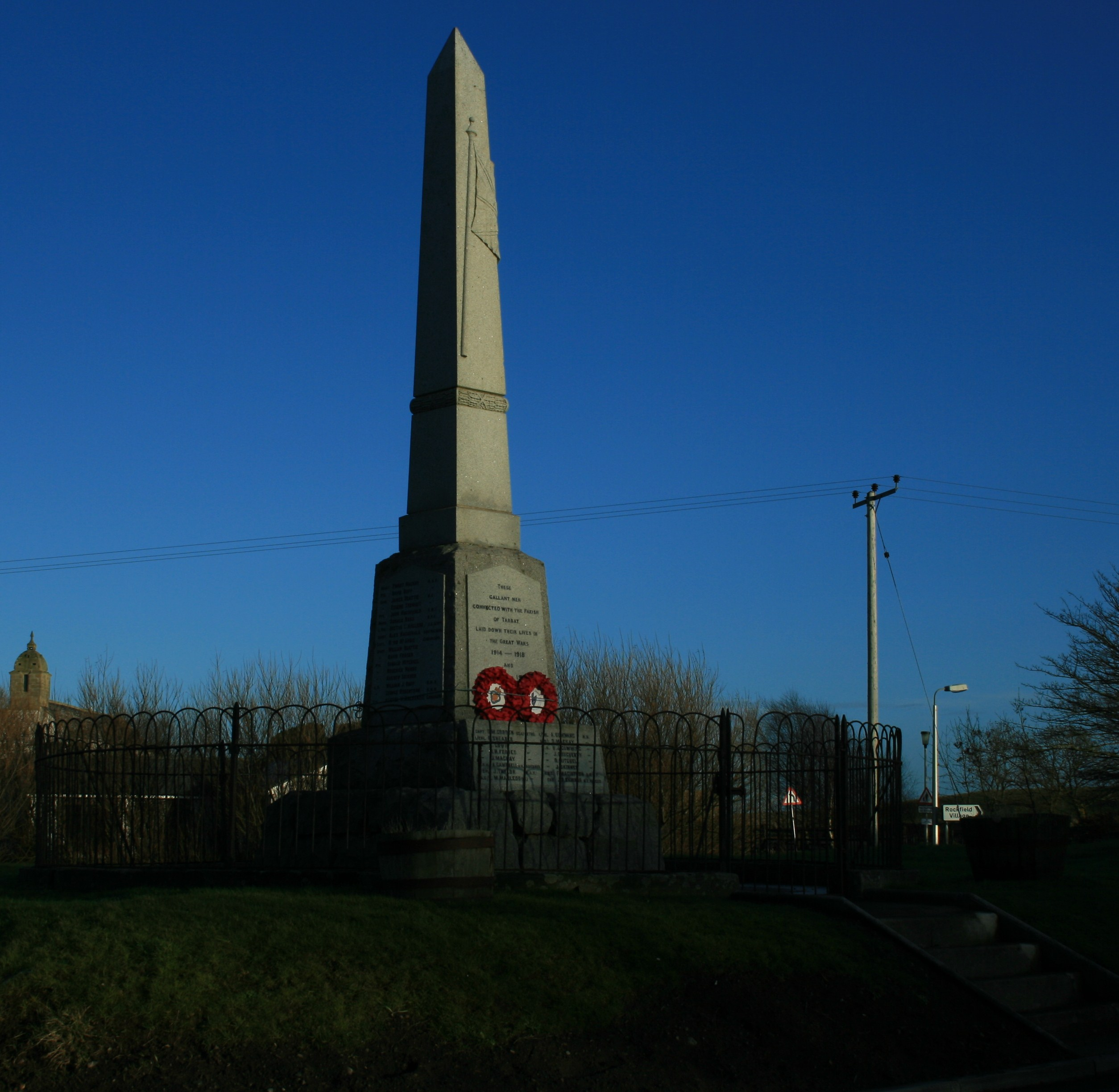
Portmahomack War Memorial
