= Combustion analysis =

Method to determine the elemental composition of organic compounds

Combustion analysis is a method used in both organic chemistry and analytical chemistry to determine the elemental composition (more precisely empirical formula) of a pure organic compound by combusting the sample under conditions where the resulting combustion products can be quantitatively analyzed. Once the number of moles of each combustion product has been determined the empirical formula or a partial empirical formula of the original compound can be calculated.

Applications for combustion analysis involve only the elements of carbon (C), hydrogen (H), nitrogen (N), and sulfur (S) as combustion of materials containing them convert these elements to their oxidized form (CO_{2}, H_{2}O, NO or NO_{2}, and SO_{2}) under high temperature high oxygen conditions. Notable interests for these elements involve measuring total nitrogen in food or feed to determine protein percentage, measuring sulfur in petroleum products, or measuring total organic carbon (TOC) in water.

== History ==
The method was invented by Joseph Louis Gay-Lussac. Justus von Liebig studied the method while working with Gay-Lussac between 1822 and 1824 and improved the method in the following years to a level that it could be used as standard procedure for organic analysis.

== Combustion train ==
A combustion train is an analytical tool for the determination of elemental composition of a chemical compound. With knowledge of elemental composition a chemical formula can be derived. The combustion train allows the determination of carbon and hydrogen in a succession of steps:

- combustion of the sample at high temperatures with Copper(II) oxide as the oxidizing agent,
- collection of the resulting gas in a hygroscopic agent (magnesium perchlorate or calcium chloride) to trap generated water,
- collection of the remainder gas in a strong base (for instance potassium hydroxide) to trap generated carbon dioxide.

Analytical determination of the amounts of water and carbon dioxide produced from a known amount of sample gives the empirical formula. For every hydrogen atom in the compound 1/2 equivalent of water is produced, and for every carbon atom in the compound 1 equivalent of carbon dioxide is produced.

Nowadays, modern instruments are sufficiently automated to be able to do these analyses routinely. Samples required are also extremely small — 0.5 mg of sample can be sufficient to give satisfactory CHN analysis.

== CHN analyzer ==
A CHN analyzer (also known as a carbon hydrogen and nitrogen analyzer) is a scientific instrument which is used to measure carbon, hydrogen and nitrogen elemental concentrations in a given sample with accuracy and precision. Sample sizes are most often just a few milligrams, but may differ depending on system. For some sample matrices larger mass is preferred due to sample heterogeneity. These analysers are capable of handling a wide variety of sample types, including solids, liquids, volatile and viscous samples, in the fields of pharmaceuticals, polymers, chemicals, environment, food and energy.

This instrument calculates the percentages of elemental concentrations based on the Dumas method, using flash combustion of the sample to cause an instantaneous oxidation into simple compounds which are then detected with thermal conductivity detection or infrared spectroscopy. Separation of interference is done by chemical reagents.

== Modern methods ==
The water vapor, carbon dioxide and other products can be separated via gas chromatography and analysed via a thermal conductivity detector.

== See also ==
- Elementar, a large manufacturer of combustion analyzers
- LECO Corporation, a large manufacturer of combustion analyzers
- Kjeldahl method, an alternative analysis of CHN content
