= Dumas method =

Method for the quantitative determination of nitrogen in chemical substances

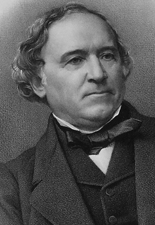
Jean-Baptiste Dumas

In analytical chemistry, the Dumas method is a method of elemental analysis for the quantitative determination of nitrogen in chemical substances based on a method first described by Jean-Baptiste Dumas in 1826.

The Dumas technique has been automated and instrumentalized, so that it is capable of rapidly measuring the crude protein concentration of food samples. This automatic Dumas technique has replaced the Kjeldahl method as the standard method of analysis for nutritional labelling of protein content of foods (except in high fat content foods where the Kjeldahl method is still preferred due to fire risks).

== Method ==
Combust a sample of known mass to 800–900 °C in the presence of an atmosphere that is oxygen-rich and nitrogen-free. Usually, this is a mixture of oxygen and helium (the carrier gas). This releases carbon dioxide, water and nitrogen. The gases are then passed over special columns that absorb the carbon dioxide and water. For example, the columns may contain an aqueous solution of potassium hydroxide.

After these columns, the carrier gas contains mostly nitrogen, but also trace amounts of carbon dioxide and water. The final column uses gas chromatography to separate nitrogen from carbon dioxide and water. At the end of the column, there is a thermal conductivity ($k$) detector. The detector consists of a heated element and a thermometer, and it measures the $k$ of the gas in which the heated element is placed. The $k$ of nitrogen differs significantly from that of the helium, such that given a nitrogen–helium mixture gas, one can measure its $k$ and infer the mass fraction $m\%$ of nitrogen in the mixture.

Under the operating conditions of the Dumas method, the mass fraction of nitrogen should remain small enough, such that the relation is approximately linear. That is, we have $k = k_{He} + \alpha m\%$ for some proportionality constant $\alpha$, when $m\%$ is small.

The signal measured by the detector begins with a plateau, indicating $k_{He}$. Then it shows a major spike indicating a nitrogen–helium mixture $k = k_{He} + \alpha m\%$. There may be two minor spikes, well-separated from the major spike, indicating the trace presence of carbon dioxide and water. Now, suppose the major spike is contained in an interval $[t_1, t_2]$, then take a time-integral,
$$m_{N_2} = \alpha^{-1} \int_{t_1}^{t_2} (k(t) - k_{He})  \dot m(t) dt$$
where $\dot m$ is the mass rate of gas flow through the detector.

As $\alpha$ is unknown, the instrument must first be calibrated by analyzing a pure sample containing a known mass of nitrogen. This allows us to measure $\alpha$.

After the nitrogen content is measured, one can convert this to the crude protein content, using conversion factors which depend on the particular amino acid sequence of the measured protein. This is the same as with the Kjeldahl method.

== Advantages and limitations ==
The Dumas method has the advantages of being easy to use and fully automatable. It has been developed into a considerably faster method than the Kjeldahl method, and can take a few minutes per measurement, as compared to the hour or more for Kjeldahl. It also does not make use of toxic chemicals or catalysts. One major disadvantage is its high initial cost, although new technology developments are reducing this drawback. Also, as with Kjeldahl, it does not give a measure of actual protein, as it registers non-protein nitrogen, and different correction factors are needed for different proteins because they have different amino acid sequences.

== See also ==
- Combustion analysis, a similar approach to Dumas but involving carbon, hydrogen, and nitrogen as well
- Bicinchoninic acid assay, a colorimetric analysis method for protein-nitrogen
