= Portmahomack sculpture fragments =

Fragments of stone Pictish art

Coordinates: 57°50′14″N 3°49′39″W

The Portmahomack sculpture fragments are the slabs and stone fragments which have been discovered at the Easter Ross settlement of Portmahomack (Tarbat), Scotland.

There are around 200 of these fragments, each the size of a handspan or larger, making Portmahomack one of the major centres of rediscovered Pictish art. Nineteen pieces were found in and around the churchyard before 1994, and the remainder were found during formal archaeological investigations by the University of York between 1994 and 2007 Tarbat Discovery Programme. The excavation director, Martin Carver has proposed that the majority of the carved pieces originated in four monumental crosses or cross-slabs of exceptional size and elaboration, placed around the site of St Colman's Church. One of these (TR1) carried four Pictish symbols, a second (TR2) had snake-headed interlace. A third (TR10, 20), features images of a complex beast and a row of apostles carrying books. This same stone originally carried along one edge a Latin inscription,

IN NOMINE IHU XRI CRUX XRI IN COMMEMORATIONE REO... LII... DIE HAC...

commemorating an unknown person. The fourth cross was covered in spiral and interlace ornament. Another large fragment, the so-called Boar Stone, has been identified as a sarcophagus lid with images of a boar and a wolf-like creature. Yet another fragment, the so-called Calf Stone, appears to belong to a shrine or screen. It depicts a bull and a cow tending to their calf. Other pieces from Portmahomack have been recognised as grave markers, incised with simple crosses. These are comparable to examples known from Iona and other early Christian sites in Argyll and western Scotland. Much of the Portmahomack sculpture has been assigned by radiocarbon dating of the layer in which it was found to the 8th century. Artistically, it has points of contact with sculpture in Iona and Northumbria, but its closest affiliation is with the great cross-slabs on other parts of the Tarbat peninsula, namely those at Hilton of Cadboll, Shandwick and Nigg, which one may perhaps assume were created by a school of masons centred on Tarbat. Together they demonstrate that the Tarbat peninsula was a prime centre of 8th-century European art.

The collection also includes a number of architectural pieces which are likely to have adorned an early stone church, including a probable label-stop and a gable finial. This collection, not yet fully published, is probably the most extensive to survive from early medieval Scotland.
