= Tashiro's indicator =

pH indicator

Tashiro's indicator is a pH indicator (pH value: 4.4–6.2), mixed indicator composed of a solution of methylene blue (0.1%) and methyl red (0.03%) in ethanol or in methanol.

Tashiro's indicator (pH indicator)
below pH 4.4		above pH 6.2
4.4	⇌	6.2

It can be used for the titration of ammonia in Kjeldahl analysis.

== Colours ==
- In acids: violet
- At equivalence point (pH 5.2): grey
- In bases: green

Methylene blue functions to change the red-yellow shift of methyl red to a more distinct violet-green shift.

== See also ==
- Litmus
- pH Indicator
