= August Dupré =

German-English chemist (1835–1907)

August Dupré (1835–1907) was a German chemist, a Fellow of the Royal Society, and naturalised in the United Kingdom in 1866.

== Life ==
Born at Mainz, Germany, on 6 September 1835, he was the second son of Jakob Friedrich (later James Frederick) Dupré (1796–1877) and his first wife Johanna Augusta Florentina Schäfer (1801–1835). Jakob was a merchant of Frankfurt from a Huguenot background who moved to London in 1843, lived in Warrington and moved back to Giessen in 1845. August was at school in Giessen and Darmstadt.

Dupré entered the University of Giessen in 1852, at age 17, with his brother Friedrich Wilhelm (died 1908), where they studied chemistry under Justus Liebig and Heinrich Will. In 1854, the brothers went to Heidelberg University, where they continued their chemical studies with Robert Bunsen and Gustav Kirchhoff. August took a Heidelberg doctorate in 1855, and they both moved to London, where he acted as assistant to William Odling, then demonstrator of Practical Chemistry in the medical school of Guy's Hospital. Friedrich meanwhile became lecturer in chemistry and toxicology at Westminster Hospital medical school. In 1863, August succeeded Friedrich in the post, which he held till 1897. In 1866 he became a naturalised British subject. From 1874 to 1901 he was lecturer in toxicology at the London School of Medicine for Women, and from 1873 to 1901 he was public analyst to the city of Westminster.

Dupré was elected a fellow of the Chemical Society in 1860, and served on its council (1871–1875). He was president of the Society of Public Analysts (1877–1878); was an original member of the Institute of Chemistry (1877), and a member of its first and four later councils. He was an original member of the Society of Chemical Industry, serving on the council (1894–1897). He was elected Fellow of the Royal Society on 3 June 1875.

Dupré died at his home, Mount Edgcumbe, Sutton, Surrey on 15 July 1907, and was buried at Benhilton, Sutton.

== Official work ==
In 1871 Dupré was appointed chemical referee to the medical department of the Local Government Board. For the Board he undertook, in 1884–1885 and 1887, inquiries on potable water and the contamination and self-purification of rivers. Subsequently with William Joseph Dibdin, Sir Frederick Abel and other chemists, he made a series of investigations, on behalf of the Metropolitan Board of Works, on the condition of the River Thames, and on sewage treatment and purification methods. In this work he made a significant contribution in connecting the bacterial theory with public health issues, and it was the background to Dibdin's work of the 1890s on the contact filter.

Dupré was engaged officially in researches on explosives. From 1873 he was consulting chemist to the explosives department of the Home Office; in 1888 he was nominated a member of the War Office explosives committee, of which Abel was chairman; and in 1906 he became a member of the Ordnance Research Board. Over 36 years he examined new and imported explosives. At the time of the Fenian attacks in 1882–1883 he investigated bombs, and especially Alfred Whitehead's manufacture of nitro-glycerine, in Ledsam Street, Birmingham.

The Treasury sought Dupré's opinion in matters of applied chemistry, and he was often a witness in medico-legal cases in the law courts. At the poisoning trial of George Henry Lamson in 1881, he gave evidence for the prosecution.

== Works ==
In collaboration with William Odling, Dupré discovered the almost universal presence of copper in vegetable and animal tissues. He was the first to observe (with Henry Bence Jones) the formation of alkaloidal substances or "ptomaines" by the decomposition of animal matters.

Dupré was joint author with Johann Ludwig Wilhelm Thudichum of On the Origin, Nature, and Varieties of Wine (1872); and with Henry Wilson Hake of A Short Manual of Inorganic Chemistry (1886; 3rd edit. 1901). From 1855 he communicated scientific papers to the publications of the Royal Society, the Chemical Society, the Society of Public Analysts, and the Society of Chemical Industry, including collaborations with his brother, Odling, Bence Jones, Wilson Hake, Otto Hehner and F. J. M. Page. He also contributed to The Analyst, Chemical News, Philosophical Magazine, and overseas periodicals.

== Family ==
Dupré married in 1876 Florence Marie, daughter of Henry Turner Robberds of Manchester. They had issue four sons and one daughter.
