= Thomas Summers West =

British chemist

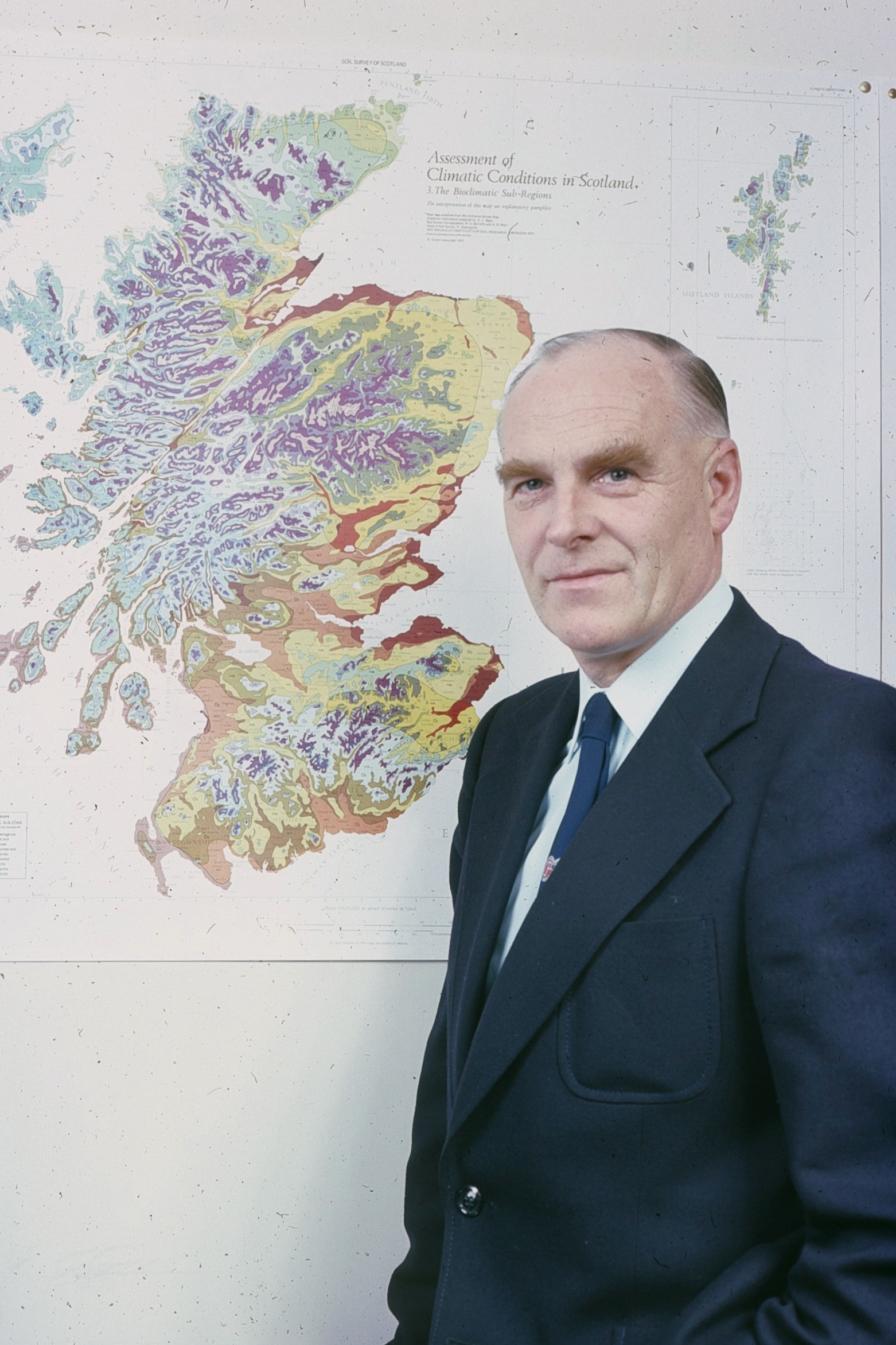
- Launch of Scotland Land Use Ordnance Survey Maps 1976. Taken at the Macaulay Institute, 1976
- Born: 18 November 1927; Peterhead, Scotland
- Died: 10 January 2010 (aged 82); Lincoln, Lincolnshire, England
- Education: Aberdeen University
- Awards: FRS 1989, CBE 1988, Maison de la Chimie Paris Honorary Member 1985, The Japan Society for Analytical Chemistry Honorary Member 1981, Fellow of the Royal Society of Edinburgh 1979, Slovak-Czech Spectroscopic Society Johannes Marcus Marci Medal 1977, Society for Analytical Chemistry Gold Medal 1977 Chemical Society Chemical Analysis and Instrumentation Medal 1976, Institute of Chemistry Meldola Medal 1956
- Scientific career
- Fields: Analytical chemistry
- Workplaces: Birmingham University Imperial College London Macaulay Institute Aberdeen
- Doctoral advisor: Ron Belcher

Thomas Summers West CBE FRS (18 November 1927 – 9 January 2010) was a British chemist.

== Life ==
=== Early years ===
He was born in 1927 in Peterhead, Scotland and educated at Old Tarbat Public School in Portmahomack and then Tain Royal Academy. He then studied chemistry and obtained a BSc degree at Aberdeen University.

He married Margaret Officer Lawson in 1952 and had three children, Ann (Cochennec, Yvon), Ruth (Byrd) and Tom.

=== Scientific career ===
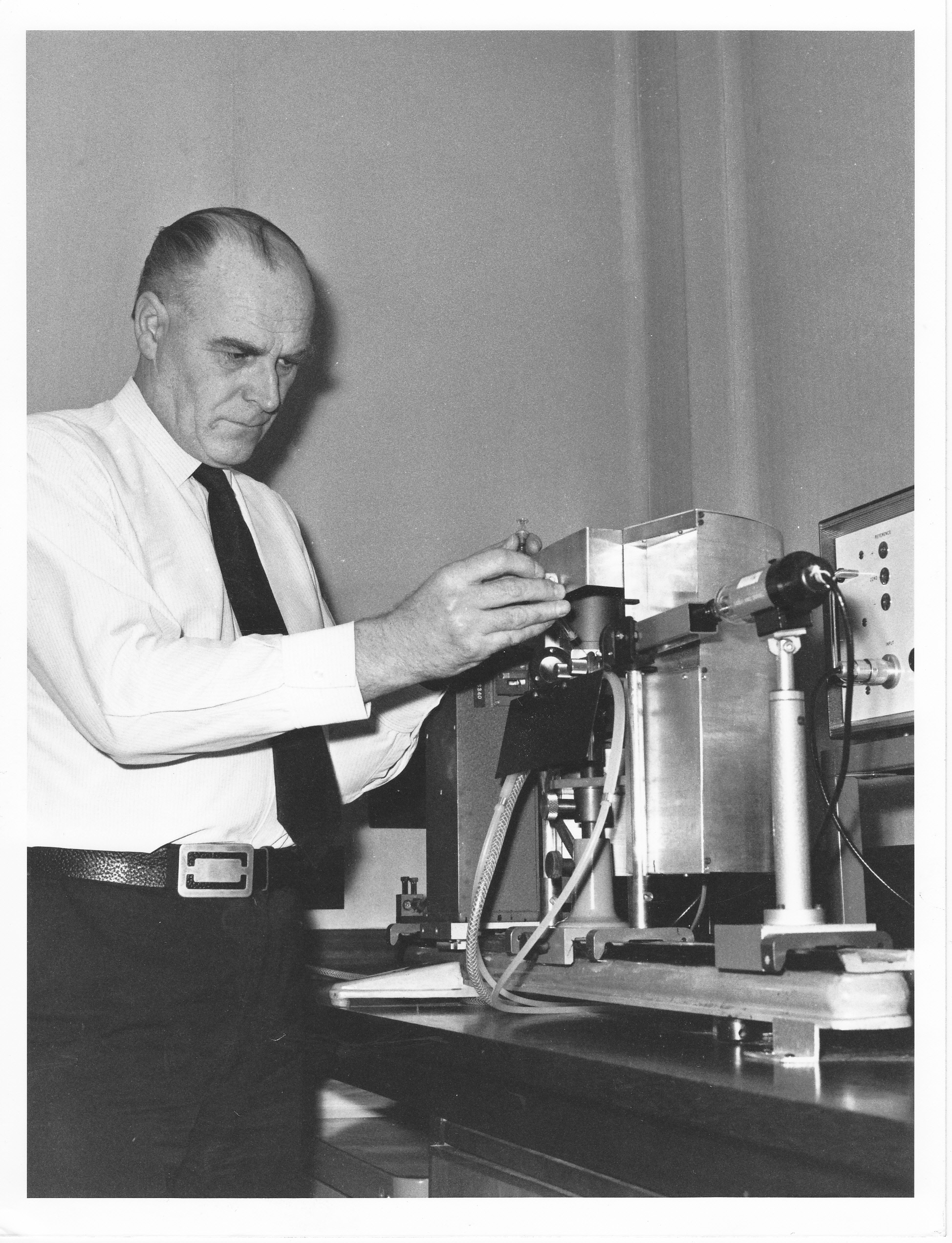
1970 Prof T.S. West at Imperial College, London.

He moved to Birmingham University in 1949 to carry out research in analytical chemistry under Professor Ron Belcher and obtained his PhD in 1952 and his D.Sc in 1962. In 1956 he was awarded the Meldola Medal and Prize of the Royal Society of Chemistry for advances in chemistry. In 1963 he moved to Imperial College in London as Reader in Analytical Chemistry and became Professor of Analytical Chemistry at Imperial College in 1965. He established a world-famous research team that included Roy Dagnall, Gordon Kirkbright and Bernard Fleet who were pioneers in the field of analytical atomic absorption spectroscopy and atomic fluorescence spectroscopy.

He became Director of the Macaulay Institute for Soil Research in 1975 retiring in 1987 and also became a Fellow of the Royal Society of Edinburgh in 1979. During this period he worked on a number of Royal Commissions and was Chairman of the Scientific Committee of Sir John May's investigation into the IRA Woolwich and Guildford bombings from 1991 to 1993. He also served as Chairman of Panels I and III on the Royal Society, International Relations Committee during the 1990s.

=== Awards and accolades ===
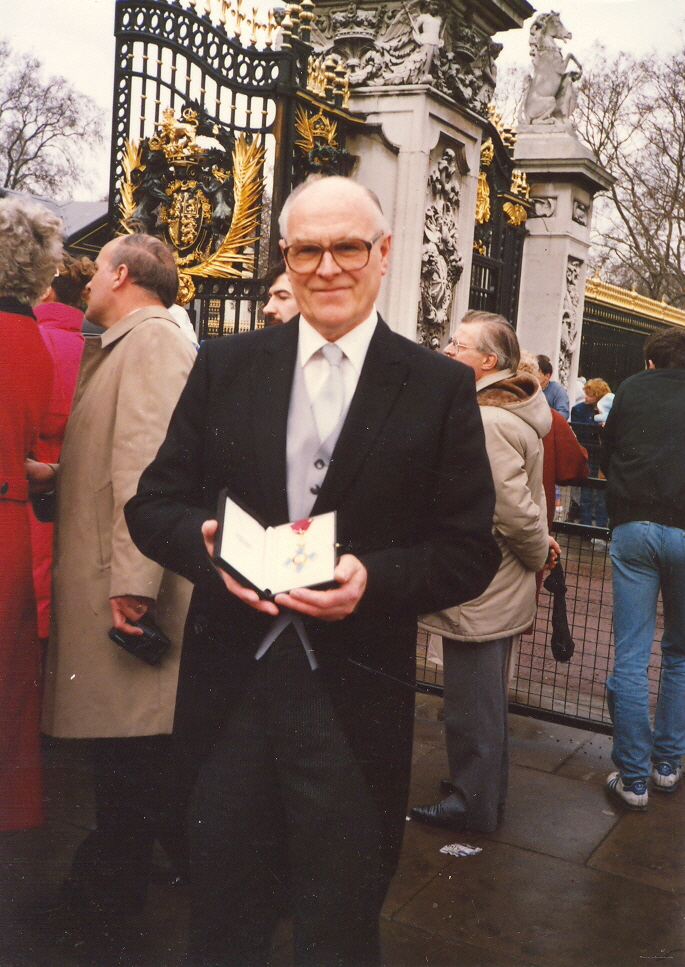
T S WEST 1987 CBE

In 1987 he was appointed a CBE and made Emeritus Professor of Chemistry at Aberdeen University having been an Honorary Professor of Aberdeen University between 1983 and 1987. He was President of the International Union of Pure and Applied Chemistry (IUPAC) between 1977 and 1979 and its Secretary General between 1983 and 1991. He was also President of the Society for Analytical Chemistry between 1969 and 1971, and Honorary Secretary of the Chemical Society between 1972 and 1975.

In March 1989 he was elected a Fellow of the Royal Society.

== Death and legacy ==
He died in Lincoln County Hospital on 9 January 2010 of heart failure; his wife Margaret died the following day, also in Lincoln County Hospital, from cancer.

In 2012 the Royal Society of Chemistry created the Tom West Analytical Fellowship in recognition of his contribution to analytical chemistry and the first award went to Dr Toby Athersuch in July 2013, presented by two of Professor West's children, Ruth Byrd and Tom West.

== Publications ==
He was an editor and publisher of scientific books and articles including 408 articles in scientific journals around the world between 1951 and 1986 either in his own name or co-written with fellow chemists as well as books that include;

- New Methods of Analytical Chemistry in association with R Belcher from Birmingham University and C.L. Wilson from Belfast University, 1955.
- Complexometry with EDTA and related reagents, 1969.
- Analytical Chemistry 1973.
