= Association of Public Analysts =

UK professional association for chemists

The Association of Public Analysts (APA) is a UK professional association for public analysts. It was founded in 1954, although an earlier body, the Society of Public Analysts, was founded in 1874, became the Society for Analytical Chemistry, and was one of the bodies which merged to form the Royal Society of Chemistry in 1980.

Through its activities it seeks to serve the public by using analytical chemistry to addressing a wide range of issues including not only the adulteration and contamination of food, drugs and other commercial products but also to aid in their accurate description. As of 2024 the APA president is Jane White.

It publishes the Journal of the Association of Public Analysts (JAPA), which appeared in print from 1963 to 1997, volumes 1-33 (ISSN 0004-5780), and was then relaunched as an online journal from volume 34, 2006 (ISSN 1749-9933).
