= Society for Analytical Chemistry =

Former learned society in the UK

The Society of Public Analysts was formed in the United Kingdom in 1874 and subsequently became the Society for Analytical Chemistry. It was incorporated in 1907.

The chemical industry had grown rapidly in the 19th century, and developments in the alkali, explosive and agricultural chemical fields produced a growing need for analytical chemists. Many of these chemists had little or no training in chemistry, and their lack of expertise was a danger to the public. Shortly after the Adulteration of Food and Drink Act 1860 (23 & 24 Vict. c. 84) the society was formed. It established adulteration and food standards, and educated analysts in legal work.

It published The Analyst, Analytical Abstracts and the Proceedings of the Society for Analytical Chemistry (from 1964 to 1974).

In April 1966 it presented its first Gold Medal to Herbert Newton Wilson (author of An Approach To Chemical Analysis)

On 15 May 1980, it amalgamated with the Chemical Society, the Royal Institute of Chemistry, and the Faraday Society to become the Royal Society of Chemistry.

== Presidents ==
- Theophilus Redwood: 1875–1876
- August Dupré: 1877–1878
- John Muter: 1879–1880
- Charles Heisch: 1881–1882
- George William Wigner: 1883–1884
- Dr Alfred Hill: 1885–1886
- Alfred Henry Allen: 1887–1888
- Matthew Adams: 1889–1890
- Otto Hehner: 1891–1892
- Sir Charles Alexander Cameron: 1893–1894
- Sir Thomas Stevenson: 1895–1896
- Bernard Dyer: 1897–1898
- Walter Fisher: 1899–1900
- Edward Voelcker: 1901–1902
- Thomas Fairley: 1903–1904
- Edward Bevan: 1905–1906
- John Clark: 1907
- Robert Rattray Tatlock: 1908–1909
- Edward Voelcker: 1910–1911
- Leonard Archbutt: 1912–1913
- Alfred Chaston Chapman: 1914–1915
- George Embrey: 1916–1917
- Samuel Rideal: 1918–1919
- Alfred Smetham: 1920–1921
- Percy Andrew Ellis Richards: 1922–1923
- George Rudd Thompson: 1924–1925
- Edward Richards Bolton: 1926–1927
- Edward Hinks: 1928–1929
- John Thomas Dunn: 1930–1931
- Francis William Frederick Arnaud: 1932–1933
- John Evans: 1934–1935
- Gerald Roche Lynch: 1936–1937
- William Henry Roberts: 1938–1939
- Edwin Burnthorpe Hughes: 1940–1942
- Samuel Ernest Melling: 1943–1944
- Gordon Wickham Monier-Williams: 1945–1946
- Lewis Eynon: 1947–1948
- George Taylor: 1949–1950
- John Ralph Nicholls: 1951–1952
- Douglas William Kent-Jones: 1953–1954
- Kenneth Alan Williams: 1955–1956
- Jack Hubert Hamence: 1957–1958
- Ralph Clark Chirnside: 1959–1960
- Arthur James Amos: 1961–1962
- Donald Clarence Garrett: 1962–1963
- Albert Arthur Smales: 1964–1966
- Arthur George Jones: 1967–1968
- Thomas Summers West: 1969–1970
- Clifford Whalley: 1971–1972
