= PCR food testing =

PCR food testing is the engagement of polymerase chain reaction (PCR) technologies for the testing of food for the presence or absence of human pathogens, such as E. coli, Salmonella, Listeria, etc.

Four sample collection sites for PCR food testing can be:

1. The food irrigation water.
2. The food wash water.
3. Environmental samples collected in the food processing facility.
4. The finished food product, whether fresh or processed.

Each of these sample types can be collected, prepared, and PCR tested within a short time for many sample types. Some sample types may require sample enrichment via shortened culture growth periods prior to PCR testing.
