= Kjeldahl method =

Method in analytical chemistry

The Kjeldahl method or Kjeldahl digestion (Danish pronunciation: [ˈkʰelˌtɛˀl]) in analytical chemistry is a method for the quantitative determination of a sample's organic nitrogen plus ammonia/ammonium (NH_{3}/NH_{4}^{+}). Without modification, other forms of inorganic nitrogen, for instance nitrate, are not included in this measurement. Using an empirical relation between Kjeldahl nitrogen and protein, it is an important method for indirectly quantifying protein content of a sample. This method was developed by the Danish chemist Johan Kjeldahl in 1883.

== Method ==
The method consists of heating a sample to 360–410 °C with concentrated sulfuric acid (H_{2}SO_{4}), which decomposes, or digests, the organic sample by oxidation to liberate the reduced nitrogen as stable ammonium sulfate: (NH_{4})_{2}SO_{4}.

Hot concentrated sulfuric acid oxidizes carbon (as bituminous coal) and sulfur (see sulfuric acid's reactions with carbon):

C + 2 H_{2}SO_{4} → CO_{2} + 2 SO_{2} + 2 H_{2}O

S + 2 H_{2}SO_{4} → 3 SO_{2} + 2 H_{2}O

Most of organic carbon and sulfur are decomposed and eliminated as gaseous CO_{2} and SO_{2}.

In contrast to organic carbon and sulfur, the digested organic nitrogen remains preserved in the concentrated sulfuric acid as stable ammonium cation (NH^{+}_{4}). Ammonium does not further oxidize to gaseous N_{2}, or a higher oxidized form of nitrogen, such as, e.g., N_{2}O, NO, NO^{−}_{2}, NO_{2}, or NO^{−}_{3}. If it was the case, the Kjeldahl method would not work.

Catalysts like selenium, Hg_{2}SO_{4} or CuSO_{4} are often added to accelerate the digestion. Na_{2}SO_{4} or K_{2}SO_{4} is also added to increase the boiling point of H_{2}SO_{4}. Digestion is complete when the liquor clarifies with the release of fumes.

After complete digestion of the sample, to recover ammonia (NH_{3}) from the ammonium sulfate, sodium hydroxide (NaOH) is first added to the residual sulfuric acid to neutralize it and to convert the soluble ammonium ion into volatile ammonia:

NH^{+}_{4} + OH^{−} → NH_{3} + H_{2}O

Then, ammonia is recovered by distillation using the system below (right side of the figure).

The end of the condenser is dipped into a known volume of standard acid (i.e. acid of known concentration). A weak acid like boric acid (H_{3}BO_{3}) in excess of ammonia is often used. Standardized HCl, H_{2}SO_{4} or some other strong acid can be used instead, but this is less commonplace. The sample solution is then distilled with a small excess of sodium hydroxide (NaOH). NaOH can also be added with a dropping funnel. NaOH converts dissolved ammonium (NH_{4}^{+}) to gaseous ammonia (NH_{3}), which boils off the sample solution. Ammonia bubbles through the standard acid solution and reacts back to ammonium salts with the weak or strong acid.

Ammonium ion concentration in the acid solution, and thus the amount of nitrogen in the sample, is measured via titration. If boric acid (or some other weak acid) was used, direct acid–base titration is done with a strong acid of known concentration. HCl or H_{2}SO_{4} can be used. Indirect back titration is used instead if strong acids were used to make the standard acid solution: a strong base of known concentration (like NaOH) is used to neutralize the solution. In this case, the amount of ammonia is calculated as the difference between the amount of HCl and NaOH. In the case of direct titration, it is not necessary to know the exact amount of weak acid (e.g. boric acid) because it does not interfere with the titration (it does have to be in excess of ammonia to trap it efficiently). Thus, one standard solution (e.g., HCl) is needed in the direct titration, while two are needed (e.g., HCl and NaOH) in the back-titration. One of the suitable indicators for these titration reactions is Tashiro's indicator.

In practice, this analysis is largely automated; specific catalysts accelerate the decomposition. Originally, the catalyst of choice was mercuric oxide. However, while it was very effective, health concerns resulted in its replacement with cupric sulfate. Cupric sulfate was less efficient than mercuric oxide and yielded lower protein results. It was soon supplemented with titanium dioxide, the approved catalyst in all protein analysis methods in the Official Methods and Recommended Practices of AOAC International.

== Applications ==
The Kjeldahl method's universality, precision and reproducibility have made it the internationally recognized method for estimating the protein content in foods. It is the standard method against which all other methods are judged. It is also used to assay soils, waste waters, fertilizers and other materials. However, it does not allow for determining the true protein content, as it measures non-protein nitrogen in addition to the nitrogen in proteins. This is evidenced by the 2007 pet food incident and the 2008 Chinese milk powder scandal, when melamine, a nitrogen-rich chemical, was added to raw materials to fake high protein contents. Also, different correction factors are needed for different proteins to account for different amino acid sequences. Additional disadvantages, such as the need to use concentrated sulfuric acid at high temperature and the relatively long testing time (an hour or more), compare unfavorably with the Dumas method for measuring crude protein content.

=== Total Kjeldahl nitrogen ===
Total Kjeldahl nitrogen or TKN is the sum of nitrogen bound in organic substances, nitrogen in ammonia (NH_{3}-N) and in ammonium (NH_{4}^{+}-N) in the chemical analysis of soil, water, or waste water (e.g. sewage treatment plant effluent).

Today, TKN is a required parameter for regulatory reporting at many treatment plants and for monitoring plant operations.

=== Conversion factors ===
TKN is often used as a surrogate for protein in food samples. The conversion from TKN to protein depends on the type of protein present in the sample and what fraction of the protein is composed of nitrogenous amino acids, like arginine and histidine. However, the range of conversion factors is relatively narrow. Example conversion factors, known as N factors, for foods range from 6.38 for dairy and 6.25 for meat, eggs, maize (corn) and sorghum to 5.83 for most grains; 5.95 for rice, 5.70 for wheat flour, and 5.46 for peanuts. In practice, 6.25 is used for almost all food and feed regardless of applicability. The factor 6.25 is specifically required by US Nutrition Label regulations in the absence of another published factor.

Specific (Jones) factors for the conversion of nitrogen content to protein content in selected foods
Animal origin	Factor	Grass seeds	Factor	Beans and peanuts	Factor
Eggs	6.25	Barley	5.83	Castor bean	5.30
Meat	6.25	Corn (maize)	6.25	Jack bean	6.25
Milk	6.38	Millets	5.83	Lima bean	6.25
		Oats	5.83	Navy bean	6.25
		Rice	5.95	Mung bean	6.25
		Rye	5.83	Soybean	5.71
		Sorghum	6.25	Velvet bean	6.25
		Wheat: Whole kernel	5.83	Peanuts	5.46
		Wheat: Bran	6.31		
		Wheat: Endosperm	5.70		

=== Sensitivity ===
The Kjeldahl method is poorly sensitive in the original version. Other detection methods have been used to quantify NH_{4}^{+} after mineralisation and distillation, achieving improved sensitivity: in-line generator of hydride coupled to a plasma atomic emission spectrometer (ICP-AES-HG, 10–25 mg/L), potentiometric titration (> 0.1 mg of nitrogen), zone capillary electrophoresis (1.5 μg/mL of nitrogen), and ion chromatography (0.5 μg/mL).

=== Limitations ===
Kjeldahl method does not apply to compounds containing nitrogen in nitro and azo groups and nitrogen present in rings (e.g. pyridine, quinoline, isoquinoline) as nitrogen of these compounds does not convert to ammonium sulfate under the conditions of this method.

== See also ==
- Dumas method, another nitrogen analysis method
- Devarda's alloy, a powerful reducing agent for nitrate analysis
- Bicinchoninic acid assay, a colorimetric assay for protein-nitrogen
- Combustion analysis another carbon, hydrogen and nitrogen analysis method

== Bibliography ==
- Wastewater Engineering: Treatment and Reuse, Metcalf & Eddy, McGraw-Hill Higher Education; 4th edition, 1 May 2002, ISBN 978-0071241403
