= Public analyst =

Scientist ensuring safety of food, water, etc

Public Analysts are scientists in the British Isles whose principal task is to ensure the safety and correct description of food by testing for compliance with legislation. Most Public Analysts are also Agricultural Analysts who carry out similar work on animal feedingstuffs and fertilisers. Nowadays this includes checking that the food labelling is accurate. They also test drinking water, and may carry out chemical and biological tests on other consumer products. While much of the work is done by other scientists and technicians in the laboratory, the Public Analyst has legal responsibility for the accuracy of the work and the validity of any opinion expressed on the results reported. The UK-based Association of Public Analysts includes members with similar roles if different titles in other countries.

== History ==
The office of Public Analyst was established by the Adulteration of Food and Drink Act 1860 (23 & 24 Vict. c. 84), the first three appointments being in London, Birmingham and Dublin. The first Scottish analyst was Henry Littlejohn in Edinburgh in 1862, who, with a strong medicinal background and brilliant mind, established many of the critical foundations of public analysis. The Sale of Food and Drugs Act 1875 (38 & 39 Vict. c. 63) made food analysis compulsory and the Sale of Food and Drugs Act 1899 (62 & 63 Vict. c. 51) extended its scope. Sampling officers generally operated through local public health or sanitary committees. By 1894 there were 99 public analysts overseeing 237 English and Welsh districts. The City of London Corporation had three food inspectors and a wharf and warehouse inspector in 1908. Bradford employed an inspector who made 756 visits to fish and chip shops in 1915. In the 1930s the staff in Birmingham comprised three qualified assistants, a clerk and a laboratory attendant.

The Nuisances Removal Act for England 1855 (18 & 19 Vict. c. 121) and the Public Health Act 1875 (38 & 39 Vict. c. 55) gave authority for taking food samples "at all reasonable times". Inspectors, police constables and samplers were responsible for taking food samples, which were divided into three parts, for the vendors, the inspectors and the analysts and sealed into bottles. Food systems were engineered to allow inspection through portals, manholes and windows. Prosecution was not common though fines and prison sentences were not unknown. Adulteration rates fell from 13.8% of samples in 1879 to 4.8% in 1930. Inspectors were empowered to follow milk to sources outside their formal jurisdiction in checking for infection with tuberculosis. Sanitary authorities were required to register all dairies and enforce cleanliness regulations.

The Manchester Corporation (General Powers) Act 1899 (62 & 63 Vict. c. clxxxviii), as amended in 1904, contained what were known as `milk clauses', which empowered officials to prosecute anyone who knowingly sold milk from cows with tuberculosis of the udder, to demand the isolation of infected cows and notification of any cow exhibiting signs of tuberculosis of the udder and to inspect the cows and take samples from herds which supplied milk to the city. By 1910 these provisions had been copied by 67 boroughs and 24 urban districts .

The Society of Public Analysts was established in 1874, later becoming the Society for Analytical Chemistry and joining with other societies to form the Royal Society of Chemistry in 1980.

Since the separation of the UK and Ireland, the function of the Public Analyst operates under different legislation, but the term and general duties are the same. The original work was chemical testing, and this is still a major part, but nowadays microbiological examination of food is an important activity, particularly in Scotland, where Public Analyst laboratories also carry out a statutory Food Examiner role.

== UK ==
The primary UK legislation is the Food Safety Act 1990. All local authorities are required to appoint a Public Analyst, although there have always been fewer Public Analysts and their laboratories than local authorities, most being shared by a number of local authorities. On the UK mainland there has always been a mixture of public sector and private sector laboratories. This remains the case today - but they all provide an equivalent service, and avoidance of conflicts of interest are ensured by the statutory terms of appointment. There is a statutory qualification requirement for Public Analysts, known as the Mastership in Chemical Analysis (MChemA), awarded by the Royal Society of Chemistry. This is a specialist postgraduate qualification by examination that verifies knowledge and understanding of food and its potential defects, interpretation of food law, and the application and interpretation of chemical analysis for food law enforcement.

The Public Analysts’ laboratories must be third-party accredited to International Standard BS EN ISO/IEC 17025:2017.

In the mid 1980s there were some 40 Public Analyst Laboratories in the UK with over 100 appointed Public Analysts. By 1993 that had reduced to 34 Laboratories and around 80 Public Analysts, and by 2010 the number of Public Analyst Laboratories had reduced to 22 with only about 26 Public Analysts. As of 2022 there are 15 Public Analyst laboratories remaining in the UK. In part, the reduction in number of laboratories over the decades has been due to rationalisation and benefits from economies of scale; however, by a larger part, it has arisen due to lack of adequate funding. Although some of the remaining laboratories are larger than many that no longer exist, the overall capacity of the system is now far less than it used to be.

Enforcement of food law in the UK is done by local authorities, principally their environmental health officers and trading standards officers. Whilst these officers are empowered to take samples of food, the actual assessment in terms of chemical analysis or microbiological examination and subsequent interpretation that are necessary to determine whether a food complies with legislation, is carried out by Public Analysts and Food Examiners respectively, scientists whose qualifications and experience are specified by regulations.

== Ireland ==
Public Analyst Laboratories in Cork, Dublin and Galway provide an analytical service to the Food Safety Authority.

== Crown Dependencies ==
There is one Public Analyst Laboratory in each of Guernsey, Isle of Man and Jersey serving the needs of these islands.

== Australia ==
There is also one Public Analyst Laboratory in Australia.

== Practice ==
The Public Analyst runs a laboratory which will:

- Analyse food:
  - for composition: many foods have legally defined, customary or expected compositions
  - for additives: which must be legally permitted and within prescribed concentrations
  - for contamination: chemical, microbiological
  - to assess the accuracy of labelling
  - to investigate whether complaints by the public are justified
- Interpret relevant law passed by the EU and UK or Ireland:
  - act as expert witness in prosecutions

In addition to their central rôle in relation to food law enforcement, Public Analysts provide expert scientific support to local authorities and the private sector in various other areas, for example they:

- analyse drinking, bathing water including swimming pools, industrial effluents, industrial process waters and other waters
- investigate environmental products and processes including assessing land contamination, building materials and examining fuels
- advise on waste management
- investigate and monitor air pollution
- advise on consumer safety - in particular consumer products such as toys
- monitor asbestos and other hazards
- carry out toxicological work to assist HM Coroners

== Sampling ==
Sampling is largely outside the control of the Public Analyst.

Local authorities have a duty to check the safety of food and to provide adequate protection of the consumer. To achieve that, they devise sampling plans, seeking to balance their need to monitor food against limited resources and other demands on their budgets. A typical sampling plan for a local authority might include samples of the following:

- samples from a particular source - a supermarket, manufacturer or caterer or country
- meat products - to check %meat or %fat or non-meat or additives or species
- product marketing claims
- undeclared ingredients in prepared foods
- contaminated products
- nutritional content of prepared meals

== See also ==
- Chartered Chemist
- Food Safety Act 1990
