= Analytical Abstracts =

- Discipline: Analytical chemistry
- Language: English

Publication details
- Publisher: Royal Society of Chemistry (U.K.)

Standard abbreviations
- ISO 4: Anal. Abstr.

Indexing
- ISSN: 0003-2689 (print); 1471-7107 (web)

Links
- Journal homepage

Analytical Abstracts is a current awareness and information retrieval service for analytical chemistry, published by the Royal Society of Chemistry in Cambridge, United Kingdom. It was first published in the mid-1950s by the Society for Analytical Chemistry, which merged with other societies in 1980 to form the Royal Society of Chemistry. This service ended in 2022.

Analytical Abstracts is available online only. It used to be published in a print edition on a monthly basis. The online version of the database is accessible to those who have access to Analytical Abstracts via an institutional licence. The online database is updated on a weekly basis, and users are able to sign up to receive email notifications informing them when an update has been submitted. Currently, Guy Jones is the executive editor and Sarah Rogers is content editor of the publication.

Rather than abstracting all articles from a list of analytical journals, Analytical Abstracts has a very focussed scope. Over half a million of articles are selected from a list of over 100 source journals, covering not only analytical chemistry, but also food and environmental chemistry subject areas (amongst others). The principal criteria for selecting an article is that it must deal with the practical measurement of one or more chemical species and must involve the use of a novel protocol.

Classification of articles is performed on the basis of three aspects of the article: the analyte, the matrix and the concept. While it is not necessary for an article to describe all three aspects, at least one of them must be identifiable for inclusion in Analytical Abstracts.

Articles in Analytical Abstracts are taken from the following areas of analytical chemistry:

- Chemometrics
- Chromatography (LC, GC, CE etc.)
- Sensors (bio-, chemo- and immunosensors)
- Food analysis
- Pharmaceutical analysis
- Biological analysis
- The -omics (proteomics, metabolomics, genomics)
- Spectroscopy and spectrometry
- Separation science
- Sample preparation
- Mass spectrometry
- Titrimetry

== See also ==
- Google Scholar
- List of academic databases and search engines
- Lists of academic journals
- List of open-access journals
- List of scientific journals
- List of scientific journals in chemistry
