= List of listed buildings in Grantown-on-Spey =

This is a list of listed buildings in the parish of Grantown on Spey in Highland, Scotland.

== List ==
Name	Location	Date Listed	Grid Ref. (Note: Sometimes known as OSGB36, the grid reference (where provided) is based on the British national grid reference system used by the Ordnance Survey. • "Guide to National Grid". Ordnance Survey. • "Get-a-map". Ordnance Survey.)	Geo-coordinates	Notes	LB Number (Note: Historic Environment Scotland assign a unique alphanumeric identifier to each designated site in Scotland, for listed buildings this always begins with "LB", for example "LB12345".)	Image
8 Castle Road				57°20′01″N 3°36′16″W	Category B	34052	Upload Photo
10, 12 Castle Road				57°20′01″N 3°36′17″W	Category C(S)	34053	Upload Photo
14, 16 Castle Road				57°20′00″N 3°36′18″W	Category B	34054	Upload Photo
18, 20 Castle Road				57°19′59″N 3°36′18″W	Category C(S)	34055	Upload Photo
20, 21 The Square				57°19′56″N 3°36′20″W	Category B	34071	Upload Photo
128 High Street				57°19′38″N 3°36′45″W	Category C(S)	34058	Upload Photo
Mossie Road, Inverallan Church, Church Of Scotland				57°19′58″N 3°36′36″W	Category B	34062	Upload another image See more images
9, The Square				57°19′53″N 3°36′29″W	Category B	34064	Upload Photo
9A The Square, (Woodlands Cottage)				57°19′54″N 3°36′31″W	Category C(S)	34067	Upload Photo
5 Castle Road				57°20′02″N 3°36′17″W	Category C(S)	34050	Upload Photo
17, 19 Castle Road				57°20′00″N 3°36′19″W	Category C(S)	34051	Upload Photo
22, The Square				57°19′56″N 3°36′21″W	Category B	34072	Upload Photo
1 High Street And 1 The Square Bank Of Scotland				57°19′51″N 3°36′31″W	Category B	34060	Upload Photo
127, 129 High Street And Adjoining House At Rear				57°19′38″N 3°36′47″W	Category B	34061	Upload Photo
12, The Square				57°19′54″N 3°36′28″W	Category B	34069	Upload Photo
22, 24 Castle Road				57°19′59″N 3°36′19″W	Category B	34056	Upload Photo
The Square, War Memorial				57°19′54″N 3°36′26″W	Category B	34063	Upload another image See more images
10A The Square				57°19′54″N 3°36′29″W	Category C(S)	34068	Upload Photo
The Square Speyside Home (Former Orphanage)				57°19′53″N 3°36′24″W	Category A	34073	Upload another image See more images
The Square Grant Arms Hotel				57°19′54″N 3°36′23″W	Category C(S)	34074	Upload another image See more images
70, 72, 74 High Street, Strathspey Hotel				57°19′45″N 3°36′36″W	Category B	34057	Upload Photo
10, The Square				57°19′53″N 3°36′29″W	Category C(S)	34065	Upload Photo
17, The Square, Morlich House And Gate Piers				57°19′57″N 3°36′25″W	Category C(S)	34070	Upload Photo
Burnfield Avenue Clifton House				57°19′58″N 3°36′19″W	Category B	34049	Upload Photo
136, 138 High Street, Willowbank				57°19′36″N 3°36′46″W	Category C(S)	34059	Upload Photo
11, The Square				57°19′54″N 3°36′29″W	Category C(S)	34066	Upload Photo

== Key ==
The scheme for classifying buildings in Scotland is:

- Category A: "buildings of national or international importance, either architectural or historic; or fine, little-altered examples of some particular period, style or building type."
- Category B: "buildings of regional or more than local importance; or major examples of some particular period, style or building type, which may have been altered."
- Category C: "buildings of local importance; lesser examples of any period, style, or building type, as originally constructed or moderately altered; and simple traditional buildings which group well with other listed buildings."

In March 2016 there were 47,288 listed buildings in Scotland. Of these, 8% were Category A, and 50% were Category B, with the remaining 42% being Category C.

== See also ==
- List of listed buildings in Highland
