= List of listed buildings in Lairg, Highland =

This is a list of listed buildings in the parish of Lairg in Highland, Scotland.

== List ==
Name	Location	Date Listed	Grid Ref. (Note: Sometimes known as OSGB36, the grid reference (where provided) is based on the British national grid reference system used by the Ordnance Survey. • "Guide to National Grid". Ordnance Survey. • "Get-a-map". Ordnance Survey.)	Geo-coordinates	Notes	LB Number (Note: Historic Environment Scotland assign a unique alphanumeric identifier to each designated site in Scotland, for listed buildings this always begins with "LB", for example "LB12345".)	Image
Lairg Burial Ground With Matheson Memorial				58°01′54″N 4°24′20″W	Category B	8019	Upload Photo
Lairg Manse (Church Of Scotland)				58°01′49″N 4°24′09″W	Category B	8025	Upload Photo
Achany House				57°58′58″N 4°25′18″W	Category B	8016	Upload Photo
Crask Bridge Over Chraisg Burn				58°11′06″N 4°30′41″W	Category C(S)	8017	Upload Photo
Lairg, Free Church Of Scotland				58°01′09″N 4°24′19″W	Category C(S)	8020	Upload Photo
Rhian Bridge Over Abhainn Sgeamhaidh Burn				58°06′54″N 4°26′26″W	Category C(S)	8026	Upload Photo
Shin Hydro Electric Scheme, Lairg Dam And Power Station				58°01′44″N 4°24′52″W	Category C(S)	51710	Upload Photo
Lairg, Free Church Manse				58°01′07″N 4°24′21″W	Category C(S)	8022	Upload Photo
Feith Osdail Bridge Over Feith Osdail Burn				58°05′29″N 4°25′09″W	Category C(S)	8018	Upload Photo
Lairg, Free Church Of Scotland Hall (Former School And Teacher's House)				58°01′08″N 4°24′22″W	Category C(S)	8021	Upload Photo
Shinness Murray Memorial				58°04′59″N 4°27′03″W	Category C(S)	8027	Upload Photo

== Key ==
The scheme for classifying buildings in Scotland is:

- Category A: "buildings of national or international importance, either architectural or historic; or fine, little-altered examples of some particular period, style or building type."
- Category B: "buildings of regional or more than local importance; or major examples of some particular period, style or building type, which may have been altered."
- Category C: "buildings of local importance; lesser examples of any period, style, or building type, as originally constructed or moderately altered; and simple traditional buildings which group well with other listed buildings."

In March 2016 there were 47,288 listed buildings in Scotland. Of these, 8% were Category A, and 50% were Category B, with the remaining 42% being Category C.

== See also ==
- List of listed buildings in Highland
