= List of listed buildings in Logie Easter, Highland =

This is a list of listed buildings in the parish of Logie Easter in Highland, Scotland.

== List ==
Name	Location	Date Listed	Grid Ref. (Note: Sometimes known as OSGB36, the grid reference (where provided) is based on the British national grid reference system used by the Ordnance Survey. • "Guide to National Grid". Ordnance Survey. • "Get-a-map". Ordnance Survey.)	Geo-coordinates	Notes	LB Number (Note: Historic Environment Scotland assign a unique alphanumeric identifier to each designated site in Scotland, for listed buildings this always begins with "LB", for example "LB12345".)	Image
Scotsburn Farm Cottage				57°45′25″N 4°08′49″W	Category C(S)	7777	Upload Photo
Old Shandwick House				57°45′04″N 4°02′22″W	Category B	7774	Upload Photo
Phipps				57°45′38″N 4°02′31″W	Category C(S)	7775	Upload Photo
Calrossie Mains Steading And Former Stables				57°46′10″N 4°00′49″W	Category C(S)	7768	Upload Photo
Kelton House (Former Parish Manse)				57°45′30″N 4°03′20″W	Category C(S)	7769	Upload Photo
Marybank				57°45′28″N 4°05′48″W	Category B	7773	Upload Photo
Arabella House				57°45′08″N 4°01′07″W	Category B	10811	Upload Photo
Scotsburn House And Gighouse And Stables				57°45′27″N 4°09′07″W	Category B	7776	Upload another image See more images
Kildary Tarbat East Lodge				57°44′48″N 4°04′23″W	Category B	7770	Upload Photo
Calrossie House				57°46′22″N 4°00′40″W	Category C(S)	7767	Upload Photo
Logie House				57°45′11″N 4°03′25″W	Category B	7771	Upload Photo

== Key ==
The scheme for classifying buildings in Scotland is:

- Category A: "buildings of national or international importance, either architectural or historic; or fine, little-altered examples of some particular period, style or building type."
- Category B: "buildings of regional or more than local importance; or major examples of some particular period, style or building type, which may have been altered."
- Category C: "buildings of local importance; lesser examples of any period, style, or building type, as originally constructed or moderately altered; and simple traditional buildings which group well with other listed buildings."

In March 2016 there were 47,288 listed buildings in Scotland. Of these, 8% were Category A, and 50% were Category B, with the remaining 42% being Category C.

== See also ==
- List of listed buildings in Highland
