= List of listed buildings in Auldearn, Highland =

This is a list of listed buildings in the parish of Auldearn in Highland, Scotland.

== List ==
Name	Location	Date listed	Geo-coordinates	Notes	Category	LB number	Image
Auldearn Parish Church, burial ground and sundial (excluding scheduled monument SM5418)			57°34′37″N 3°48′31″W		B	1647	Upload another image
Brightmony House, Garden Walls With Garden House And Pair Gate Piers			57°33′40″N 3°47′27″W		A	1657	Upload Photo
Craggie Dovecote			57°33′33″N 3°49′31″W		B	1658	Upload Photo
Innes Mount			57°34′35″N 3°48′23″W		C(S)	1662	Upload Photo
Lethen House And Front Garden Gate And Railings			57°32′38″N 3°46′37″W		B	1664	Upload another image
Moyness House			57°34′07″N 3°44′20″W		C(S)	1669	Upload another image
Kinsteary Lodge And Walled Garden			57°33′59″N 3°47′40″W		B	1663	Upload Photo
Dalmore, Former Free Church			57°33′48″N 3°48′28″W		C(S)	1659	Upload another image
Easter Clune			57°32′32″N 3°44′50″W		B	1660	Upload Photo
Lethen House Dovecote			57°32′35″N 3°46′50″W		B	1667	Upload another image
Lethen House Mains, Steading And Cottages With Estate Office			57°32′42″N 3°46′33″W		B	1668	Upload Photo
Boath House, Stables, Former Carriage House Range Fronting Former Steading, Single Carriage House And Hen House			57°34′51″N 3°48′27″W		B	1656	Upload Photo
Boath Dovecote			57°34′40″N 3°48′44″W		B	1648	Upload another image See more images
Boath House			57°34′46″N 3°48′30″W		A	1649	Upload another image See more images
Grigorhill			57°34′04″N 3°49′48″W		C(S)	1661	Upload another image
Lethen House Granary			57°32′41″N 3°46′36″W		B	1665	Upload Photo
Lethen House South Lodge (At Lethen Mill)			57°32′37″N 3°46′12″W		C(S)	1666	Upload another image

== Key ==
The scheme for classifying buildings in Scotland is:

- Category A: "buildings of national or international importance, either architectural or historic; or fine, little-altered examples of some particular period, style or building type."
- Category B: "buildings of regional or more than local importance; or major examples of some particular period, style or building type, which may have been altered."
- Category C: "buildings of local importance; lesser examples of any period, style, or building type, as originally constructed or moderately altered; and simple traditional buildings which group well with other listed buildings."

In March 2016 there were 47,288 listed buildings in Scotland. Of these, 8% were Category A, and 50% were Category B, with the remaining 42% being Category C.

== See also ==
- List of listed buildings in Highland
