= List of listed buildings in Snizort, Highland =

This is a list of listed buildings in the parish of Snizort in Highland, Scotland.

== List ==
Name	Location	Date Listed	Grid Ref. (Note: Sometimes known as OSGB36, the grid reference (where provided) is based on the British national grid reference system used by the Ordnance Survey. • "Guide to National Grid". Ordnance Survey. • "Get-a-map". Ordnance Survey.)	Geo-coordinates	Notes	LB Number (Note: Historic Environment Scotland assign a unique alphanumeric identifier to each designated site in Scotland, for listed buildings this always begins with "LB", for example "LB12345".)	Image
Lyndedale House				57°30′27″N 6°23′49″W	Category B	13968	Upload Photo
Skeabost, Post House And Outbuilding				57°27′07″N 6°18′14″W	Category B	18979	Upload Photo
Kensaleyre, Old Manse				57°29′26″N 6°18′55″W	Category C(S)	13966	Upload Photo
Skeabost House Lodge And Gatepiers				57°27′08″N 6°18′18″W	Category C(S)	13972	Upload Photo
Uig Church, Church Of Scotland, Churchyard Walls And Gatepiers				57°35′30″N 6°21′22″W	Category B	13977	Upload Photo
Kingsburgh House				57°30′46″N 6°21′10″W	Category C(S)	13967	Upload Photo
Skerinish House And Steading				57°28′29″N 6°18′54″W	Category B	13975	Upload Photo
Kensaleyre Church Of Scotland (Snizort Parish Church)				57°28′56″N 6°18′14″W	Category B	13965	Upload Photo
Skeabost, Old Bridge				57°27′09″N 6°18′12″W	Category B	13970	Upload another image See more images
By Skeabost Former Free Church School				57°27′24″N 6°19′28″W	Category C(S)	13974	Upload Photo
Uig Free Church				57°35′08″N 6°21′23″W	Category C(S)	13978	Upload another image See more images
Skeabost House Hotel				57°27′16″N 6°18′52″W	Category C(S)	13971	Upload another image See more images
By Skeabost Snizort Free Church				57°27′25″N 6°19′28″W	Category C(S)	13973	Upload Photo
Lyndedale House Lodge And Gate Piers				57°30′05″N 6°23′24″W	Category B	13969	Upload Photo
Uig, Round Tower				57°35′05″N 6°21′33″W	Category B	13976	Upload another image

== Key ==
The scheme for classifying buildings in Scotland is:

- Category A: "buildings of national or international importance, either architectural or historic; or fine, little-altered examples of some particular period, style or building type."
- Category B: "buildings of regional or more than local importance; or major examples of some particular period, style or building type, which may have been altered."
- Category C: "buildings of local importance; lesser examples of any period, style, or building type, as originally constructed or moderately altered; and simple traditional buildings which group well with other listed buildings."

In March 2016 there were 47,288 listed buildings in Scotland. Of these, 8% were Category A, and 50% were Category B, with the remaining 42% being Category C.

== See also ==
- List of listed buildings in Highland
