= List of listed buildings in Urray, Highland =

This is a list of listed buildings in the parish of Urray in Highland, Scotland.

== List ==
Name	Location	Date listed	Geo-coordinates	Notes	Category	LB number	Image
Old Urray (Former Parish Manse) Steading, With Barn, And Cottage			57°32′33″N 4°29′46″W		B	14019	Upload Photo
Urray (West) Parish Church (Church Of Scotland) And Burial Ground			57°32′16″N 4°29′33″W		B	14023	Upload Photo
Easter Moy			57°33′26″N 4°31′28″W		B	14029	Upload Photo
Aultvaich Corrie Vanie Threshing Barn, Byre And Wheel House			57°29′56″N 4°29′59″W		B	18964	Upload Photo
Tomich House Gate Piers And Garden Walls			57°29′53″N 4°27′03″W		B	14022	Upload Photo
Fairburn Tower			57°32′07″N 4°33′29″W		A	14030	Upload Photo
Fairburn House			57°32′27″N 4°34′58″W		B	14031	Upload Photo
Muir Of Ord Ord House Hotel. Formerly Ord House			57°31′12″N 4°28′55″W		B	14017	Upload Photo
Old Urray And Rear Walled Garden (Former Parish Manse.)			57°32′32″N 4°29′45″W		B	14018	Upload Photo
Chapelton Evelix			57°31′31″N 4°27′50″W		B	14028	Upload Photo
Kilchrist Chapel (Now Mausoleum) And Burial Ground			57°30′34″N 4°26′26″W		B	14037	Upload Photo
Brahan West Entrance Gate Piers And Gates			57°33′29″N 4°30′50″W		C(S)	14025	Upload Photo
Highfield Cottage Lodge, Gate Piers, Gates And Railings			57°31′47″N 4°27′54″W		B	14034	Upload Photo
Highfield North Lodge			57°32′09″N 4°29′12″W		B	14035	Upload Photo
Muir Of Ord Ord Cottage			57°31′17″N 4°28′05″W		C(S)	14038	Upload Photo
Tarradale Mains Dovecote			57°30′38″N 4°24′48″W		B	14021	Upload Photo
Brahan Mains Square			57°33′33″N 4°29′15″W		B	14026	Upload Photo
Highfield Cottage			57°31′52″N 4°27′55″W		B	14033	Upload Photo
Conon Valley Hydro Electric Scheme, Orrin Dam With Integrated Fish Pass			57°30′55″N 4°40′06″W		B	51708	Upload Photo
Conon Valley Hydro Electric Scheme, Torr Achilty Power Station And Dam			57°33′15″N 4°35′54″W		C(S)	51709	Upload Photo
Orrin Bridge Over River Orrain At Aultgowrie			57°31′43″N 4°32′46″W		B	14020	Upload Photo
Dunmore, Cottage Immediately Nw Of Dun Mor At Ngr Nh 5118 4723			57°29′27″N 4°29′04″W		B	14024	Upload Photo
Brahan, Seaforth Monument			57°33′30″N 4°30′59″W		B	14027	Upload Photo
Fairburn, Aultgowrie Lodge, Gate Piers And Gates			57°31′47″N 4°32′45″W		B	14032	Upload Photo
Highfield West Lodge			57°31′48″N 4°29′05″W		C(S)	14036	Upload Photo

== Key ==
The scheme for classifying buildings in Scotland is:

- Category A: "buildings of national or international importance, either architectural or historic; or fine, little-altered examples of some particular period, style or building type."
- Category B: "buildings of regional or more than local importance; or major examples of some particular period, style or building type, which may have been altered."
- Category C: "buildings of local importance; lesser examples of any period, style, or building type, as originally constructed or moderately altered; and simple traditional buildings which group well with other listed buildings."

In March 2016 there were 47,288 listed buildings in Scotland. Of these, 8% were Category A, and 50% were Category B, with the remaining 42% being Category C.

== See also ==
- List of listed buildings in Highland
