= List of listed buildings in Kincardine, Highland =

This is a list of listed buildings in the parish of Kincardine in Highland, Scotland.

== List ==
Name	Location	Date Listed	Grid Ref. (Note: Sometimes known as OSGB36, the grid reference (where provided) is based on the British national grid reference system used by the Ordnance Survey. • "Guide to National Grid". Ordnance Survey. • "Get-a-map". Ordnance Survey.)	Geo-coordinates	Notes	LB Number (Note: Historic Environment Scotland assign a unique alphanumeric identifier to each designated site in Scotland, for listed buildings this always begins with "LB", for example "LB12345".)	Image
Carbisdale Castle Service Court				57°55′26″N 4°24′31″W	Category C(S)	7166	Upload Photo
Carron Bridge Over River Carron				57°53′10″N 4°23′15″W	Category B	7167	Upload Photo
Gledfield Mill				57°53′02″N 4°23′30″W	Category C(S)	7173	Upload Photo
Strathcarron Cawdearg				57°53′12″N 4°25′34″W	Category C(S)	7180	Upload Photo
Ardgay Railway Station And Footbridge				57°52′53″N 4°21′44″W	Category C(S)	7164	Upload Photo
Gledfield House Gate Lodge				57°52′58″N 4°23′25″W	Category C(S)	7172	Upload Photo
Invercharron Farm House				57°53′44″N 4°22′01″W	Category C(S)	7175	Upload Photo
Strathcarron Croick Parish Manse				57°53′07″N 4°36′31″W	Category B	7182	Upload Photo
Gledfield House, Walled Garden And Garden Loggia				57°52′54″N 4°23′51″W	Category B	7169	Upload Photo
Gledfield House Gate Piers And Retaining Walls				57°52′58″N 4°23′26″W	Category C(S)	7171	Upload Photo
Kincardine Church (Former Parish Church) And Burial Ground				57°52′21″N 4°21′12″W	Category B	7176	Upload Photo
Invercharron House, Gates And Gate Piers				57°53′32″N 4°22′45″W	Category B	7174	Upload Photo
Lower Gledfield Free Church Of Scotland And Gate Piers				57°53′09″N 4°22′33″W	Category B	7177	Upload Photo
Strathcarron Braelangwell Lodge				57°53′58″N 4°30′18″W	Category C(S)	7179	Upload Photo
Carbisdale Castle And Entrance Gates				57°55′32″N 4°24′31″W	Category B	7165	Upload another image
Gledfield House Stables				57°52′56″N 4°23′51″W	Category C(S)	7170	Upload Photo
Lower Gledfield Former Free Church School				57°53′10″N 4°22′25″W	Category B	7178	Upload Photo
Strathcarron Croick Parish Church (Church Of Scotland) And Burial Ground				57°53′09″N 4°36′16″W	Category A	7181	Upload another image
Culrain Mains				57°55′09″N 4°24′26″W	Category C(S)	7168	Upload Photo
Strathcarron Gruinard Lodge (Or Greenyards)				57°53′41″N 4°29′26″W	Category C(S)	7163	Upload Photo
Ardgay Ice House				57°52′59″N 4°21′45″W	Category B	7183	Upload Photo

== Key ==
The scheme for classifying buildings in Scotland is:

- Category A: "buildings of national or international importance, either architectural or historic; or fine, little-altered examples of some particular period, style or building type."
- Category B: "buildings of regional or more than local importance; or major examples of some particular period, style or building type, which may have been altered."
- Category C: "buildings of local importance; lesser examples of any period, style, or building type, as originally constructed or moderately altered; and simple traditional buildings which group well with other listed buildings."

In March 2016 there were 47,288 listed buildings in Scotland. Of these, 8% were Category A, and 50% were Category B, with the remaining 42% being Category C.

== See also ==
- List of listed buildings in Highland
