= List of listed buildings in Urquhart and Logie Wester =

This is a list of listed buildings in the parish of Urquhart and Logie Wester in Highland, Scotland.

== List ==
Name	Location	Date Listed	Grid Ref. (Note: Sometimes known as OSGB36, the grid reference (where provided) is based on the British national grid reference system used by the Ordnance Survey. • "Guide to National Grid". Ordnance Survey. • "Get-a-map". Ordnance Survey.)	Geo-coordinates	Notes	LB Number (Note: Historic Environment Scotland assign a unique alphanumeric identifier to each designated site in Scotland, for listed buildings this always begins with "LB", for example "LB12345".)	Image
Conon Mains Dovecote				57°32′51″N 4°27′09″W	Category B	14900	Upload Photo
Drummondreach				57°35′07″N 4°22′50″W	Category C(S)	14904	Upload Photo
Ferintosh Free Church				57°34′47″N 4°23′11″W	Category B	14905	Upload another image
Urquhart (Old) Manse				57°35′29″N 4°22′57″W	Category B	14909	Upload another image
Riverford	Conon Bridge			57°33′38″N 4°26′22″W	Category C(S)	14913	Upload Photo
Larchfield, Station Road	Conon Bridge			57°33′53″N 4°26′10″W	Category B	14912	Upload another image
Conon House, Gatepiers And Gates				57°32′54″N 4°26′39″W	Category B	14899	Upload another image
Conon Bridge Hotel	Conon Bridge			57°34′05″N 4°26′22″W	Category B	14902	Upload another image See more images
Conon Cottage and 1-6 (Inclusive Nos) Conon Homes With Lych Gate and Boundary Wall, School Road	Conon Bridge			57°33′39″N 4°26′11″W	Category C(S)	44622	Upload another image
Kinkell Castle, and Surrounding Wall and Studio Cottage				57°33′21″N 4°25′07″W	Category A	14906	Upload another image See more images
Alma Cottage and Beaufort	Culbokie			57°36′06″N 4°20′20″W	Category C(S)	14916	Upload Photo
Monument To Sir Hector Macdonald	Mulbuie			57°32′14″N 4°25′21″W	Category C(S)	14907	Upload another image See more images
The Drouthy Duck (Riverside Tavern), High Street	Conon Bridge			57°34′04″N 4°26′24″W	Category C(S)	51658	Upload another image
Conan House (Conon House)				57°33′02″N 4°27′03″W	Category B	14898	Upload another image
Conan Mains Steading				57°32′51″N 4°27′13″W	Category B	14901	Upload another image
Teanahinch				57°35′05″N 4°23′36″W	Category B	14908	Upload Photo
Urquhart Parish Church				57°35′19″N 4°22′50″W	Category B	14910	Upload another image
Urquhart Old Burial Ground And Remains Of Previous Parish Church				57°35′39″N 4°22′35″W	Category B	14911	Upload another image
Conon Bridge Railway Bridge	Conon Bridge			57°34′05″N 4°26′34″W	Category B	14903	Upload another image See more images

== Key ==
The scheme for classifying buildings in Scotland is:

- Category A: "buildings of national or international importance, either architectural or historic; or fine, little-altered examples of some particular period, style or building type."
- Category B: "buildings of regional or more than local importance; or major examples of some particular period, style or building type, which may have been altered."
- Category C: "buildings of local importance; lesser examples of any period, style, or building type, as originally constructed or moderately altered; and simple traditional buildings which group well with other listed buildings."

In March 2016 there were 47,288 listed buildings in Scotland. Of these, 8% were Category A, and 50% were Category B, with the remaining 42% being Category C.

== See also ==
- List of listed buildings in Highland
