= List of listed buildings in Farr, Sutherland =

This is a list of listed buildings in the parish of Farr in Sutherland county, Highland, Scotland.

== List ==
Name	Location	Date Listed	Grid Ref. (Note: Sometimes known as OSGB36, the grid reference (where provided) is based on the British national grid reference system used by the Ordnance Survey. • "Guide to National Grid". Ordnance Survey. • "Get-a-map". Ordnance Survey.)	Geo-coordinates	Notes	LB Number (Note: Historic Environment Scotland assign a unique alphanumeric identifier to each designated site in Scotland, for listed buildings this always begins with "LB", for example "LB12345".)	Image
Strathy And Halladale Mission Church At Craigton Strath Halladale				58°28′34″N 3°54′02″W	Category B	12922	Upload Photo
Smigel Mill				58°29′36″N 3°53′48″W	Category B	7141	Upload Photo
Strath Halladale Mission Church				58°29′40″N 3°53′50″W	Category C(S)	7142	Upload Photo
Allt A' Chraisg Bridge Over Allt A' Chraisg (Burn)				58°12′34″N 4°29′54″W	Category C(S)	7153	Upload Photo
Armadale House				58°32′42″N 4°04′50″W	Category C(S)	7155	Upload Photo
Bighouse, Garden Pavilion And Walled Garden				58°33′27″N 3°54′22″W	Category A	7160	Upload Photo
Syre Church (Church Of Scotland)				58°21′51″N 4°14′05″W	Category C(S)	7147	Upload Photo
Altnaharra Bridge Over River Mudale				58°17′12″N 4°26′36″W	Category B	7154	Upload Photo
Bettyhill Ivy Cottage And Steading				58°31′49″N 4°11′27″W	Category B	7158	Upload Photo
Smigel Bridge Farr				58°29′36″N 3°53′50″W	Category B	12915	Upload Photo
Strathy, Former Free Church School				58°33′36″N 3°59′22″W	Category C(S)	7146	Upload Photo
Bettyhill Farr Old Church (Former Church Of Scotland Parish Church) And Burial Ground				58°31′45″N 4°12′34″W	Category B	7156	Upload Photo
Bettyhill Former Fishing Station Including Ice House, Ruined Dwelling House And Boilhouse				58°31′39″N 4°14′04″W	Category B	49634	Upload Photo
Strathy Former Church Of Scotland				58°33′33″N 4°00′14″W	Category C(S)	7143	Upload Photo
Strathy, Free Church				58°33′36″N 3°59′20″W	Category C(S)	7144	Upload Photo
Bettyhill Farr Old Manse (Former Church Of Scotland Parish Manse)				58°31′46″N 4°12′26″W	Category C(S)	7157	Upload Photo
Bighouse "The Barracks"				58°33′24″N 3°54′28″W	Category B	7161	Upload Photo
Bighouse Ice House				58°33′29″N 3°54′22″W	Category B	7162	Upload Photo
Bighouse House, Garden Walls And West Gate Piers				58°33′26″N 3°54′27″W	Category B	7159	Upload Photo
Bighouse Mains Steading				58°33′31″N 3°54′10″W	Category C(S)	7140	Upload Photo
Strathy, Former Free Church Manse				58°33′36″N 3°59′18″W	Category C(S)	7145	Upload Photo

== Key ==
The scheme for classifying buildings in Scotland is:

- Category A: "buildings of national or international importance, either architectural or historic; or fine, little-altered examples of some particular period, style or building type."
- Category B: "buildings of regional or more than local importance; or major examples of some particular period, style or building type, which may have been altered."
- Category C: "buildings of local importance; lesser examples of any period, style, or building type, as originally constructed or moderately altered; and simple traditional buildings which group well with other listed buildings."

In March 2016 there were 47,288 listed buildings in Scotland. Of these, 8% were Category A, and 50% were Category B, with the remaining 42% being Category C.

== See also ==
- List of listed buildings in Highland
