= List of listed buildings in Nigg, Highland =

This is a list of listed buildings in the parish of Nigg in Highland, Scotland.

== List ==
Name	Location	Date Listed	Grid Ref. (Note: Sometimes known as OSGB36, the grid reference (where provided) is based on the British national grid reference system used by the Ordnance Survey. • "Guide to National Grid". Ordnance Survey. • "Get-a-map". Ordnance Survey.)	Geo-coordinates	Notes	LB Number (Note: Historic Environment Scotland assign a unique alphanumeric identifier to each designated site in Scotland, for listed buildings this always begins with "LB", for example "LB12345".)	Image
Bayfield House				57°43′51″N 4°00′03″W	Category B	14041	Upload Photo
Nigg House Mains Steading And Granary				57°43′03″N 4°00′34″W	Category C(S)	14048	Upload Photo
Old Manse And Garden Walls And Gate Piers				57°43′06″N 4°00′28″W	Category B	14051	Upload Photo
Chapelhill Church (Church Of Scotland)				57°44′13″N 3°58′32″W	Category B	14042	Upload Photo
Nigg Parish Church (Church Of Scotland) And Graveyard				57°43′09″N 4°00′32″W	Category A	14044	Upload Photo
Nigg Parish Hall (Former Free Church)				57°43′24″N 4°00′23″W	Category B	14045	Upload Photo
Nigg House Formerly Nigg Farmhouse				57°43′07″N 4°00′35″W	Category B	14046	Upload Photo
Pitcalzean House Coach House				57°42′23″N 4°00′38″W	Category C(S)	14050	Upload Photo
Nigg House Cottage Stable And Gig House				57°43′05″N 4°00′32″W	Category C(S)	14047	Upload Photo
Old Manse Steading				57°43′05″N 4°00′30″W	Category C(S)	14039	Upload Photo
1/2 Easter Rarichie				57°44′44″N 3°56′36″W	Category B	14043	Upload Photo
Ankerville Corner The Old Store House				57°44′39″N 3°59′07″W	Category C(S)	14040	Upload Photo
Pitcalzean House				57°42′21″N 4°00′43″W	Category B	14049	Upload Photo

== Key ==
The scheme for classifying buildings in Scotland is:

- Category A: "buildings of national or international importance, either architectural or historic; or fine, little-altered examples of some particular period, style or building type."
- Category B: "buildings of regional or more than local importance; or major examples of some particular period, style or building type, which may have been altered."
- Category C: "buildings of local importance; lesser examples of any period, style, or building type, as originally constructed or moderately altered; and simple traditional buildings which group well with other listed buildings."

In March 2016 there were 47,288 listed buildings in Scotland. Of these, 8% were Category A, and 50% were Category B, with the remaining 42% being Category C.

== See also ==
- List of listed buildings in Highland
