= List of listed buildings in Highland =

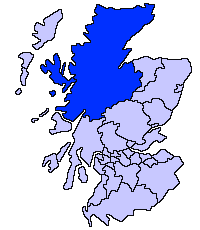
Highland shown within Scotland

This is a list of listed buildings in the Highland council area of Scotland. For Category A listed buildings, see List of Category A listed buildings in Highland.

The list is split out by civil parish.

- List of listed buildings in Abernethy and Kincardine, Highland
- List of listed buildings in Alness, Highland
- List of listed buildings in Alvie, Highland
- List of listed buildings in Applecross, Highland
- List of listed buildings in Ardclach, Highland
- List of listed buildings in Ardersier, Highland
- List of listed buildings in Ardgour, Highland
- List of listed buildings in Ardnamurchan
- List of listed buildings in Arisaig and Moidart, Highland
- List of listed buildings in Assynt, Highland
- List of listed buildings in Auldearn, Highland
- List of listed buildings in Avoch, Highland
- List of listed buildings in Boleskine and Abertarff, Highland
- List of listed buildings in Bower, Highland
- List of listed buildings in Bracadale, Highland
- List of listed buildings in Canisbay, Highland
- List of listed buildings in Cawdor, Highland
- List of listed buildings in Clyne, Highland
- List of listed buildings in Contin, Highland
- List of listed buildings in Creich, Highland
- List of listed buildings in Cromarty, Highland
- List of listed buildings in Cromdale, Inverallan and Advie, Highland
- List of listed buildings in Croy and Dalcross, Highland
- List of listed buildings in Daviot and Dunlichity, Highland
- List of listed buildings in Dingwall, Highland
- List of listed buildings in Dores, Highland
- List of listed buildings in Dornoch, Highland
- List of listed buildings in Duirinish, Highland
- List of listed buildings in Dunnet, Highland
- List of listed buildings in Durness, Highland
- List of listed buildings in Duthil and Rothiemurchus, Highland
- List of listed buildings in Edderton, Highland
- List of listed buildings in Eddrachillis, Highland
- List of listed buildings in Farr, Highland
- List of listed buildings in Fearn, Highland
- List of listed buildings in Fodderty, Highland
- List of listed buildings in Fort William, Highland
- List of listed buildings in Fortrose, Highland
- List of listed buildings in Gairloch, Highland
- List of listed buildings in Glenelg, Highland
- List of listed buildings in Glenorchy and Inishail, Highland
- List of listed buildings in Glenshiel, Highland
- List of listed buildings in Golspie, Highland
- List of listed buildings in Grantown On Spey, Highland
- List of listed buildings in Halkirk, Highland
- List of listed buildings in Invergordon, Highland
- List of listed buildings in Inverness and Bona, Highland
- List of listed buildings in Inverness, Highland
- List of listed buildings in Kildonan, Highland
- List of listed buildings in Killearnan, Highland
- List of listed buildings in Kilmallie, Highland
- List of listed buildings in Kilmonivaig, Highland
- List of listed buildings in Kilmorack, Highland
- List of listed buildings in Kilmuir Easter, Highland
- List of listed buildings in Kilmuir, Highland
- List of listed buildings in Kiltarlity and Convinth, Highland
- List of listed buildings in Kiltearn, Highland
- List of listed buildings in Kincardine, Highland
- List of listed buildings in Kingussie and Insh, Highland
- List of listed buildings in Kingussie, Highland
- List of listed buildings in Kintail, Highland
- List of listed buildings in Kirkhill, Highland
- List of listed buildings in Knockbain, Highland
- List of listed buildings in Laggan, Highland
- List of listed buildings in Lairg, Highland
- List of listed buildings in Latheron, Highland
- List of listed buildings in Lismore and Appin, Highland
- List of listed buildings in Lochalsh, Highland
- List of listed buildings in Lochbroom, Highland
- List of listed buildings in Lochcarron, Highland
- List of listed buildings in Logie Easter, Highland
- List of listed buildings in Loth, Highland
- List of listed buildings in Morvern, Highland
- List of listed buildings in Moy and Dalarossie, Highland
- List of listed buildings in Nairn, Highland
- List of listed buildings in Nigg, Highland
- List of listed buildings in Olrig, Highland
- List of listed buildings in Petty, Highland
- List of listed buildings in Portree, Highland
- List of listed buildings in Reay, Highland
- List of listed buildings in Resolis, Highland
- List of listed buildings in Rogart, Highland
- List of listed buildings in Rosemarkie, Highland
- List of listed buildings in Rosskeen, Highland
- List of listed buildings in Sleat, Highland
- List of listed buildings in Small Isles, Highland
- List of listed buildings in Snizort, Highland
- List of listed buildings in Strath, Highland
- List of listed buildings in Tain, Highland
- List of listed buildings in Tarbat, Highland
- List of listed buildings in Thurso, Highland
- List of listed buildings in Tongue, Highland
- List of listed buildings in Urquhart and Glenmoriston, Highland
- List of listed buildings in Urquhart and Logie Wester, Highland
- List of listed buildings in Urray, Highland
- List of listed buildings in Watten, Highland
- List of listed buildings in Wick, Highland

== See also ==
- Scheduled monuments in Highland
