= List of listed buildings in Glenshiel, Highland =

This is a list of listed buildings in the parish of Glenshiel in Highland, Scotland.

== List ==
Name	Location	Date Listed	Grid Ref. (Note: Sometimes known as OSGB36, the grid reference (where provided) is based on the British national grid reference system used by the Ordnance Survey. • "Guide to National Grid". Ordnance Survey. • "Get-a-map". Ordnance Survey.)	Geo-coordinates	Notes	LB Number (Note: Historic Environment Scotland assign a unique alphanumeric identifier to each designated site in Scotland, for listed buildings this always begins with "LB", for example "LB12345".)	Image
Bridges Ratagan, Bridge On Shiel Bridge/Glenelg Road (Over Allt Ratagan)				57°13′04″N 5°27′08″W	Category B	7221	Upload Photo
Shiel Bridge And Causeway (Over River Shiel)				57°12′50″N 5°25′14″W	Category B	7213	Upload Photo
By Shiel Bridge Bridge (Over Allt Undalain)				57°12′45″N 5°25′03″W	Category C(S)	7222	Upload Photo
Duich House (Former Glenshiel Manse)				57°14′25″N 5°29′19″W	Category B	7214	Upload Photo
Ratagan Youth Hostel				57°13′21″N 5°26′50″W	Category C(S)	7216	Upload Photo
Shiel Bridge Shiel Farm				57°12′49″N 5°25′19″W	Category B	7219	Upload Photo
Totaig, Ferry House And Slipway				57°16′09″N 5°31′30″W	Category B	7220	Upload Photo
Glenshiel Church (Church Of Scotland)				57°14′08″N 5°28′52″W	Category C(S)	7215	Upload Photo
Ratagan Lodge Hotel				57°13′23″N 5°27′00″W	Category B	7218	Upload Photo
Croe Bridge (Over River Croe)				57°14′12″N 5°23′03″W	Category B	7211	Upload Photo
Bridge Near Site Of Battle Of Glenshiel (Over River Shiel)				57°09′56″N 5°19′31″W	Category B	7212	Upload Photo
Ratagan, Head Forester's House				57°13′18″N 5°26′53″W	Category C(S)	7217	Upload Photo

== Key ==
The scheme for classifying buildings in Scotland is:

- Category A: "buildings of national or international importance, either architectural or historic; or fine, little-altered examples of some particular period, style or building type."
- Category B: "buildings of regional or more than local importance; or major examples of some particular period, style or building type, which may have been altered."
- Category C: "buildings of local importance; lesser examples of any period, style, or building type, as originally constructed or moderately altered; and simple traditional buildings which group well with other listed buildings."

In March 2016 there were 47,288 listed buildings in Scotland. Of these, 8% were Category A, and 50% were Category B, with the remaining 42% being Category C.

== See also ==
- List of listed buildings in Highland
