= List of listed buildings in Reay, Highland =

This is a list of listed buildings in the parish of Reay in Highland, Scotland.

== List ==
Name	Location	Date Listed	Grid Ref. (Note: Sometimes known as OSGB36, the grid reference (where provided) is based on the British national grid reference system used by the Ordnance Survey. • "Guide to National Grid". Ordnance Survey. • "Get-a-map". Ordnance Survey.)	Geo-coordinates	Notes	LB Number (Note: Historic Environment Scotland assign a unique alphanumeric identifier to each designated site in Scotland, for listed buildings this always begins with "LB", for example "LB12345".)	Image
Reay Free Church, Enclosing Walls To Frontage And Memorial Sited Therein, Achimenach, By Shebster				58°33′12″N 3°40′42″W	Category B	14983	Upload Photo
Sandside House Kiln Barn And Single Storey Range Of Former Byres, Cottage And Dairy, And Implement Shed				58°33′45″N 3°48′10″W	Category A	14986	Upload Photo
Sandside Harbour 1 And 2, Sandside And Fishing Store				58°34′10″N 3°47′38″W	Category A	14988	Upload Photo
Reay Village, Smithy Cottage And Steading Range (Former Dwellings At Right Angles)				58°33′24″N 3°47′44″W	Category C(S)	14982	Upload Photo
Sandside House Gate Lodge And Gate Piers				58°33′25″N 3°48′17″W	Category B	14987	Upload Photo
Reay Old Burial Ground				58°33′33″N 3°46′25″W	Category B	14980	Upload Photo
Reay Village Market Cross Adjacent To The Terrace New Reay				58°33′24″N 3°47′27″W	Category B	18831	Upload Photo
Sandside House				58°33′42″N 3°48′10″W	Category B	14984	Upload Photo
Lybster Farm Steading				58°35′38″N 3°40′46″W	Category B	14991	Upload Photo
Reay Village, Brackside Bridge Over Brackside-Sandside Burn				58°33′25″N 3°47′38″W	Category C(S)	14981	Upload Photo
Upper Dounreay Farm Steading				58°34′13″N 3°43′27″W	Category B	14989	Upload Photo
Reay Village, Reayburn House				58°33′37″N 3°46′20″W	Category B	17592	Upload Photo
Shebster Barn				58°33′15″N 3°41′24″W	Category C(S)	17593	Upload Photo
Sandside House, Garden Walls, 2 Walled Gardens, Dovecote And Privy				58°33′44″N 3°48′16″W	Category B	14985	Upload Photo
Reay Parish Church And Enclosure Wall				58°33′33″N 3°46′36″W	Category A	14992	Upload Photo
Forss Mill (West Bank Of Forss Water)				58°35′43″N 3°39′34″W	Category B	14990	Upload Photo

== Key ==
The scheme for classifying buildings in Scotland is:

- Category A: "buildings of national or international importance, either architectural or historic; or fine, little-altered examples of some particular period, style or building type."
- Category B: "buildings of regional or more than local importance; or major examples of some particular period, style or building type, which may have been altered."
- Category C: "buildings of local importance; lesser examples of any period, style, or building type, as originally constructed or moderately altered; and simple traditional buildings which group well with other listed buildings."

In March 2016 there were 47,288 listed buildings in Scotland. Of these, 8% were Category A, and 50% were Category B, with the remaining 42% being Category C.

== See also ==
- List of listed buildings in Highland
