= List of listed buildings in Resolis, Highland =

This is a list of listed buildings in the parish of Resolis in Highland, Scotland.

== List ==
Name	Location	Date Listed	Grid Ref. (Note: Sometimes known as OSGB36, the grid reference (where provided) is based on the British national grid reference system used by the Ordnance Survey. • "Guide to National Grid". Ordnance Survey. • "Get-a-map". Ordnance Survey.)	Geo-coordinates	Notes	LB Number (Note: Historic Environment Scotland assign a unique alphanumeric identifier to each designated site in Scotland, for listed buildings this always begins with "LB", for example "LB12345".)	Image
Kirkmichael Graveyard Dyke And Gatepiers				57°39′49″N 4°10′17″W	Category C(S)	14941	Upload Photo
Resolis Free Church				57°39′05″N 4°13′34″W	Category C(S)	14946	Upload Photo
Jemimaville Main Street Friedlander's House				57°39′30″N 4°08′46″W	Category C(S)	14957	Upload Photo
Braelangwell				57°38′58″N 4°11′19″W	Category B	14937	Upload Photo
Rescolis Manse, Gardenwall And Steading				57°39′33″N 4°12′58″W	Category B	14948	Upload Photo
Jemimaville Main Street Trenton And Maryville				57°39′30″N 4°08′55″W	Category C(S)	14965	Upload Photo
Newhall Gate Piers And Gates				57°39′30″N 4°10′38″W	Category B	14943	Upload Photo
Jemimaville Main Street Drought's Cottage				57°39′29″N 4°09′05″W	Category C(S)	14968	Upload Photo
Castle Craig				57°38′36″N 4°17′37″W	Category A	14938	Upload Photo
Newhall				57°39′40″N 4°11′00″W	Category A	14942	Upload Photo
Gordon's Mills				57°39′36″N 4°10′11″W	Category C(S)	14939	Upload Photo
Ferryton Girnal Or Granary				57°40′23″N 4°12′53″W	Category C(S)	14951	Upload Photo
Jemimaville, Main Street Laurel Cottage				57°39′30″N 4°08′48″W	Category C(S)	14958	Upload Photo
Jemimaville, Main Street Rosedene				57°39′30″N 4°08′49″W	Category C(S)	14960	Upload Photo
Jemimaville Main Street Dale Villa				57°39′30″N 4°08′53″W	Category C(S)	14963	Upload Photo
Jemimaville Main Street Bay View				57°39′30″N 4°08′53″W	Category C(S)	14964	Upload Photo
Kirkmichael Remains Of Kirmichael Church And Burial Ground				57°39′49″N 4°10′17″W	Category B	14940	Upload Photo
Mains Of Newhall				57°39′41″N 4°11′17″W	Category B	14944	Upload Photo
Jemimaville, Main Street Woodlands				57°39′30″N 4°08′49″W	Category C(S)	14959	Upload Photo
Jemimaville, Main Street, Miss Thomas				57°39′30″N 4°08′51″W	Category C(S)	14962	Upload Photo
Jemimaville Main Street Old Manse (Free Church)				57°39′29″N 4°08′59″W	Category B	14966	Upload Photo
Balblair Ferry Inn				57°40′17″N 4°10′32″W	Category C(S)	14936	Upload Photo
Poyntzfield House				57°38′59″N 4°09′43″W	Category A	14949	Upload Photo
Poyntzfield Gatepiers, North And South Entrance				57°39′18″N 4°09′58″W	Category C(S)	14950	Upload Photo
Old Cullicudden Burial Ground, Dyke And Gatepiers				57°39′19″N 4°15′53″W	Category B	14945	Upload Photo
Resolis Parish Church				57°39′35″N 4°12′59″W	Category B	14947	Upload Photo
Jemimaville, Main Street, Firth View				57°39′30″N 4°08′50″W	Category C(S)	14961	Upload Photo
Jemimaville Main Street Langlands Cottage				57°39′29″N 4°09′04″W	Category C(S)	14967	Upload Photo

== Key ==
The scheme for classifying buildings in Scotland is:

- Category A: "buildings of national or international importance, either architectural or historic; or fine, little-altered examples of some particular period, style or building type."
- Category B: "buildings of regional or more than local importance; or major examples of some particular period, style or building type, which may have been altered."
- Category C: "buildings of local importance; lesser examples of any period, style, or building type, as originally constructed or moderately altered; and simple traditional buildings which group well with other listed buildings."

In March 2016 there were 47,288 listed buildings in Scotland. Of these, 8% were Category A, and 50% were Category B, with the remaining 42% being Category C.

== See also ==
- List of listed buildings in Highland
