= List of listed buildings in Ardersier, Highland =

This is a list of listed buildings in the parish of Ardersier in Highland, Scotland.

== List ==
Name	Location	Date Listed	Grid Ref. (Note: Sometimes known as OSGB36, the grid reference (where provided) is based on the British national grid reference system used by the Ordnance Survey. • "Guide to National Grid". Ordnance Survey. • "Get-a-map". Ordnance Survey.)	Geo-coordinates	Notes	LB Number (Note: Historic Environment Scotland assign a unique alphanumeric identifier to each designated site in Scotland, for listed buildings this always begins with "LB", for example "LB12345".)	Image
Kirkton, Old Burial Ground And Watch-House				57°35′01″N 4°02′30″W	Category B	1720	Upload Photo
Ardersier Village 11 High Street				57°34′14″N 4°02′18″W	Category C(S)	1717	Upload Photo
Fort George				57°34′59″N 4°04′27″W	Category A	1721	Upload another image
Ardersier Village 16 High Street				57°34′15″N 4°02′19″W	Category B	1740	Upload another image
Fort George, 3 K6 Telephone Kiosks				57°35′01″N 4°04′16″W	Category B	1722	Upload another image
Ardersier Village, 63, 64 High Street				57°34′14″N 4°02′19″W	Category B	1746	Upload another image
Ardersier Village, 66 High Street, Alma Hotel				57°34′13″N 4°02′18″W	Category B	1747	Upload another image
Ardersier Village 18 High Street, Invertromie And Shop				57°34′16″N 4°02′19″W	Category C(S)	1741	Upload Photo
Ardersier Village, 32 High Street				57°34′19″N 4°02′23″W	Category C(S)	1743	Upload Photo
Ardersier Village, 58, 59, 60 High Street (R-L)				57°34′15″N 4°02′20″W	Category B	1745	Upload another image
Ardersier Village 107 High Street Elmbank				57°34′01″N 4°02′12″W	Category B	1748	Upload another image
Ardersier Village, 13 High Street				57°34′15″N 4°02′18″W	Category B	1718	Upload another image
Ardersier Village 15, 15A High Street				57°34′15″N 4°02′19″W	Category B	1719	Upload Photo
Ardersier Village, 109 High Street				57°34′00″N 4°02′12″W	Category C(S)	1749	Upload another image
Ardersier Village, High Street Windyhill				57°34′06″N 4°02′14″W	Category B	1751	Upload another image
Ardersier Mains And Gate Piers				57°34′22″N 4°01′59″W	Category C(S)	1716	Upload Photo
Ardersier Village 26 High Street, Bourtree House				57°34′18″N 4°02′20″W	Category C(S)	1742	Upload Photo
Ardersier Village, 57 High Street				57°34′16″N 4°02′21″W	Category B	1744	Upload another image
Ardersier Village, 137 Manse Road Albyn				57°33′56″N 4°02′13″W	Category B	1750	Upload Photo

== Key ==
The scheme for classifying buildings in Scotland is:

- Category A: "buildings of national or international importance, either architectural or historic; or fine, little-altered examples of some particular period, style or building type."
- Category B: "buildings of regional or more than local importance; or major examples of some particular period, style or building type, which may have been altered."
- Category C: "buildings of local importance; lesser examples of any period, style, or building type, as originally constructed or moderately altered; and simple traditional buildings which group well with other listed buildings."

In March 2016 there were 47,288 listed buildings in Scotland. Of these, 8% were Category A, and 50% were Category B, with the remaining 42% being Category C.

== See also ==
- List of listed buildings in Highland
