= List of listed buildings in Olrig, Highland =

This is a list of listed buildings in the parish of Olrig in Highland, Scotland.

== List ==
Name	Location	Date Listed	Grid Ref. (Note: Sometimes known as OSGB36, the grid reference (where provided) is based on the British national grid reference system used by the Ordnance Survey. • "Guide to National Grid". Ordnance Survey. • "Get-a-map". Ordnance Survey.)	Geo-coordinates	Notes	LB Number (Note: Historic Environment Scotland assign a unique alphanumeric identifier to each designated site in Scotland, for listed buildings this always begins with "LB", for example "LB12345".)	Image
Castletown Icehouse				58°35′43″N 3°22′39″W	Category C(S)	14011	Upload Photo
Castletown, The Old Reading Room				58°35′25″N 3°23′06″W	Category B	44957	Upload Photo
Castletown Mill				58°35′37″N 3°22′32″W	Category B	14012	Upload another image See more images
Gate Lodge And Gate Piers, Olrig House				58°34′50″N 3°23′46″W	Category B	14015	Upload another image
Olrig, South Lodge Including Boundary Wall				58°34′22″N 3°24′15″W	Category B	46555	Upload Photo
Murkle, Biggins Steading				58°35′40″N 3°26′12″W	Category B	14013	Upload Photo
Olrig House				58°34′39″N 3°24′05″W	Category B	14014	Upload another image
Castletown Borgie House				58°35′07″N 3°23′25″W	Category C(S)	14009	Upload Photo
Castlehill Harbour and Boathouse, Castletown				58°35′53″N 3°22′54″W	Category C(S)	14010	Upload another image See more images
Olrig Farmhouse				58°34′58″N 3°24′34″W	Category B	14016	Upload Photo

== Key ==
The scheme for classifying buildings in Scotland is:

- Category A: "buildings of national or international importance, either architectural or historic; or fine, little-altered examples of some particular period, style or building type."
- Category B: "buildings of regional or more than local importance; or major examples of some particular period, style or building type, which may have been altered."
- Category C: "buildings of local importance; lesser examples of any period, style, or building type, as originally constructed or moderately altered; and simple traditional buildings which group well with other listed buildings."

In March 2016 there were 47,288 listed buildings in Scotland. Of these, 8% were Category A, and 50% were Category B, with the remaining 42% being Category C.

== See also ==
- List of listed buildings in Highland
