= List of listed buildings in Clyne, Highland =

This is a list of listed buildings in the parish of Clyne in Highland, Scotland.

== List ==
Name	Location	Date Listed	Grid Ref. (Note: Sometimes known as OSGB36, the grid reference (where provided) is based on the British national grid reference system used by the Ordnance Survey. • "Guide to National Grid". Ordnance Survey. • "Get-a-map". Ordnance Survey.)	Geo-coordinates	Notes	LB Number (Note: Historic Environment Scotland assign a unique alphanumeric identifier to each designated site in Scotland, for listed buildings this always begins with "LB", for example "LB12345".)	Image
Brora 8-18 Rosslyn Street (L-R)				58°00′39″N 3°51′25″W	Category C(S)	569	Upload Photo
Brora, Railway Bridge Over River Brora				58°00′42″N 3°51′08″W	Category B	570	Upload Photo
Brora, Shore Street, Ardassie				58°00′37″N 3°50′54″W	Category C(S)	572	Upload Photo
Brora, Victoria Road 1-10, The Terrace				58°00′46″N 3°51′12″W	Category B	574	Upload Photo
Clynelish House Laundry And Walled Garden				58°01′22″N 3°52′11″W	Category B	579	Upload Photo
1, 2, 3, Clynelish Farm Cottages (L-R)				58°01′24″N 3°52′20″W	Category B	581	Upload Photo
Gordonbush Lodge				58°03′42″N 3°57′28″W	Category B	584	Upload Photo
Balnacoil Lodge				58°04′30″N 4°01′34″W	Category B	591	Upload Photo
Brora Harbour Road Ice House				58°00′41″N 3°51′02″W	Category C(S)	573	Upload Photo
Brora Rosslyn Street Rockpool				58°00′40″N 3°51′29″W	Category B	568	Upload Photo
Brora Railway Station And Foot Bridge				58°00′47″N 3°51′08″W	Category C(S)	571	Upload another image
Brora Fountain Square Jubilee Fountain				58°00′40″N 3°51′19″W	Category B	593	Upload Photo
Inverbrora				58°00′20″N 3°52′26″W	Category B	5102	Upload Photo
Clynekirkton Balranald (Former Clyne Church Of Scotland Manse) Walled Garden And Gate Piers				58°01′47″N 3°52′24″W	Category B	575	Upload Photo
Clynekirkton, Old Parish Church And Burial Ground				58°01′48″N 3°52′24″W	Category B	577	Upload Photo
4, Clynelish Farm Cottages				58°01′25″N 3°52′20″W	Category C(S)	582	Upload Photo
Clynelish Farm Steading And Dairy				58°01′25″N 3°52′16″W	Category B	580	Upload Photo
Brora, Clynelish Road, Former Clyne Parish School Including Boundary Walls				58°01′26″N 3°51′28″W	Category C(S)	49184	Upload Photo
Clynemilton				58°02′17″N 3°50′27″W	Category B	583	Upload Photo
Clynekirkton Bell Tower				58°01′49″N 3°52′26″W	Category B	576	Upload Photo
Clynelish Brora Distillery				58°01′30″N 3°52′08″W	Category B	578	Upload Photo
Brora Golf Road Royal Marine Hotel				58°00′44″N 3°50′54″W	Category B	592	Upload Photo
Brora Rosslyn Street Grove Cottage				58°00′36″N 3°51′38″W	Category C(S)	567	Upload Photo

== Key ==
The scheme for classifying buildings in Scotland is:

- Category A: "buildings of national or international importance, either architectural or historic; or fine, little-altered examples of some particular period, style or building type."
- Category B: "buildings of regional or more than local importance; or major examples of some particular period, style or building type, which may have been altered."
- Category C: "buildings of local importance; lesser examples of any period, style, or building type, as originally constructed or moderately altered; and simple traditional buildings which group well with other listed buildings."

In March 2016 there were 47,288 listed buildings in Scotland. Of these, 8% were Category A, and 50% were Category B, with the remaining 42% being Category C.

== See also ==
- List of listed buildings in Highland
