= List of listed buildings in Abernethy and Kincardine, Highland =

This is a list of listed buildings in the parish of Abernethy and Kincardine in Highland, Scotland.

== List ==
Name	Location	Date listed	Grid ref. (Note: Sometimes known as OSGB36, the grid reference (where provided) is based on the British national grid reference system used by the Ordnance Survey. • "Guide to National Grid". Ordnance Survey. • "Get-a-map". Ordnance Survey.)	Geo-coordinates	Notes	LB number (Note: Historic Environment Scotland assign a unique alphanumeric identifier to each designated site in Scotland, for listed buildings this always begins with "LB", for example "LB12345".)	Image
Nethy Bridge, Coulnakyle Cottage				57°16′24″N 3°39′40″W	Category C(S)	44953	Upload Photo
Nethy Bridge, Aultmore House Garden Pavilions Terrace Walls And Walled Garden				57°16′31″N 3°38′12″W	Category A	549	Upload Photo
Nethy Bridge, Aultmore House Gate Lodge, Gate Piers And Bridge Over Allt Mor				57°16′27″N 3°38′27″W	Category B	528	Upload Photo
Nethy Bridge, Abernethy (Old) Parish Church And Burial Ground Church Of Scotland				57°16′33″N 3°39′00″W	Category C(S)	547	Upload Photo
Nethy Bridge, Aultmore House Assembly Hall, Curlew, Kestrel And Osprey				57°16′33″N 3°38′06″W	Category B	550	Upload Photo
Nethy Bridge, Dell Lodge				57°15′23″N 3°38′16″W	Category B	531	Upload Photo
Kincardine Church, And Burial Ground Church Of Scotland				57°13′05″N 3°45′35″W	Category C(S)	545	Upload Photo
Nethybridge, Birchfield				57°15′54″N 3°39′52″W	Category B	529	Upload Photo
Nethy Bridge, Aultmore Bridge Over Allt Mor				57°16′25″N 3°39′07″W	Category C(S)	548	Upload Photo
Nethy Bridge, Coulnakyle				57°16′23″N 3°39′44″W	Category B	530	Upload Photo
Nethy Bridge Over River Nethy				57°15′54″N 3°39′28″W	Category B	546	Upload Photo
By Nethy Bridge, Forest Lodge				57°13′32″N 3°37′25″W	Category B	532	Upload Photo
By Nethy Bridge, Lurg				57°14′13″N 3°35′39″W	Category B	533	Upload Photo

== Key ==
The scheme for classifying buildings in Scotland is:

- Category A: "buildings of national or international importance, either architectural or historic; or fine, little-altered examples of some particular period, style or building type."
- Category B: "buildings of regional or more than local importance; or major examples of some particular period, style or building type, which may have been altered."
- Category C: "buildings of local importance; lesser examples of any period, style, or building type, as originally constructed or moderately altered; and simple traditional buildings which group well with other listed buildings."

In March 2016 there were 47,288 listed buildings in Scotland. Of these, 8% were Category A, and 50% were Category B, with the remaining 42% being Category C.

== See also ==
- List of listed buildings in Highland
