= List of listed buildings in Moy and Dalarossie =

This is a list of listed buildings in the parish of Moy and Dalarossie in Highland, Scotland.

== List ==
Name	Location	Date Listed	Grid Ref. (Note: Sometimes known as OSGB36, the grid reference (where provided) is based on the British national grid reference system used by the Ordnance Survey. • "Guide to National Grid". Ordnance Survey. • "Get-a-map". Ordnance Survey.)	Geo-coordinates	Notes	LB Number (Note: Historic Environment Scotland assign a unique alphanumeric identifier to each designated site in Scotland, for listed buildings this always begins with "LB", for example "LB12345".)	Image
Moy Church Of Scotland, Watch-House And Burial Ground				57°22′54″N 4°02′40″W	Category B	14891	Upload Photo
Tomatin Railway Viaduct Over (Old) A9 Road				57°20′11″N 3°59′27″W	Category B	14894	Upload Photo
Moy Hall Estate Forestry Cottages And Stables				57°23′30″N 4°02′55″W	Category B	19220	Upload Photo
Tomatin, Findhorn Bridge				57°19′28″N 3°59′15″W	Category B	14885	Upload Photo
Former Moy Parish Manse (Church Of Scotland)				57°22′54″N 4°02′43″W	Category B	14892	Upload Photo
Findhorn Bridge, Moy Free Church				57°19′23″N 3°58′59″W	Category B	14895	Upload Photo
Moy Obelisk (On Island In Loch Moy)				57°22′58″N 4°02′16″W	Category B	14889	Upload Photo
Findhorn Bridge, Old Free Church Manse				57°19′26″N 3°58′54″W	Category C(S)	14896	Upload Photo
Garbole Bridge Over The Kyllachy Burn				57°17′33″N 4°03′43″W	Category C(S)	14897	Upload Photo
Moy Hall Estate, Game Larder				57°23′32″N 4°02′47″W	Category C(S)	19205	Upload Photo
Moy Hall Estate Kennels				57°23′32″N 4°02′48″W	Category C(S)	19218	Upload Photo
Dalarossie Church Of Scotland And Burial Ground				57°17′30″N 4°02′51″W	Category B	14884	Upload Photo
Kyllachy House				57°18′27″N 4°01′00″W	Category C(S)	14886	Upload Photo
Moy, Bridge Over Funlack Burn By Milton Of Moy				57°21′44″N 4°00′06″W	Category C(S)	14888	Upload Photo
Moy Hall Mains, Hen House				57°23′35″N 4°03′04″W	Category C(S)	14890	Upload Photo
Moy, Aultnaslanach Viaduct Over Allt Na Slanaich Burn				57°23′16″N 4°03′52″W	Category A	14887	Upload Photo
Moy Hall Estate Porter's Lodge (South Lodge) Including Gatepiers, Gates And Boundary Walls				57°23′05″N 4°03′22″W	Category B	19216	Upload Photo
Moy Hall Estate Cottage Next To Kennels				57°23′31″N 4°02′48″W	Category C(S)	19217	Upload Photo
Moy Hall Estate Gardener's Cottage				57°23′27″N 4°03′08″W	Category C(S)	19219	Upload Photo
Tomatin, Railway Viaduct Over River Findhorn				57°20′03″N 3°58′59″W	Category B	14893	Upload Photo

== Key ==
The scheme for classifying buildings in Scotland is:

- Category A: "buildings of national or international importance, either architectural or historic; or fine, little-altered examples of some particular period, style or building type."
- Category B: "buildings of regional or more than local importance; or major examples of some particular period, style or building type, which may have been altered."
- Category C: "buildings of local importance; lesser examples of any period, style, or building type, as originally constructed or moderately altered; and simple traditional buildings which group well with other listed buildings."

In March 2016 there were 47,288 listed buildings in Scotland. Of these, 8% were Category A, and 50% were Category B, with the remaining 42% being Category C.

== See also ==
- List of listed buildings in Highland
