= List of listed buildings in Lochbroom, Highland =

This is a list of listed buildings in the parish of Lochbroom in Highland, Scotland.

== List ==
Name	Location	Date Listed	Grid Ref. (Note: Sometimes known as OSGB36, the grid reference (where provided) is based on the British national grid reference system used by the Ordnance Survey. • "Guide to National Grid". Ordnance Survey. • "Get-a-map". Ordnance Survey.)	Geo-coordinates	Notes	LB Number (Note: Historic Environment Scotland assign a unique alphanumeric identifier to each designated site in Scotland, for listed buildings this always begins with "LB", for example "LB12345".)	Image
Ullapool Main Road, The Manse	Ullapool			57°53′51″N 5°09′04″W	Category B	7788	Upload Photo
Walled Garden, Dundonnel House	Dundonnell			57°49′24″N 5°10′52″W	Category B	7757	Upload Photo
Lochbroom Parish Church (Church Of Scotland) and Burial Ground, Inverbroom	Inverbroom			57°48′56″N 5°04′14″W	Category B	7760	Upload another image See more images
Inverlael Farm (Formerly Lochbroom Post Office)	Inverlael			57°49′34″N 5°03′52″W	Category B	7762	Upload another image
Inverlael Bridge Over River Lael	Inverlael			57°49′18″N 5°03′47″W	Category B	7763	Upload another image
Ullapool, 1, 2 Custom House Street, Drill Hall And House	Ullapool			57°53′55″N 5°09′33″W	Category C(S)	49788	Upload another image
Ullapool Argyle Street Old Bank House	Ullapool			57°53′47″N 5°09′31″W	Category B	7785	Upload Photo
Parish Church (Church Of Scotland), Old Mill Street	Ullapool			57°53′54″N 5°09′24″W	Category C(S)	7789	Upload another image
Ullapool Old Mill Street, Hill Cottage And Rear Byre Range	Ullapool			57°53′58″N 5°09′12″W	Category C(S)	7790	Upload Photo
Corrieshalloch Gorge, Suspension Footbridge Over Measach Falls	Braemore			57°45′21″N 5°01′16″W	Category B	7755	Upload another image See more images
Dundonnell House	Dundonnell			57°49′23″N 5°10′48″W	Category B	7756	Upload another image See more images
Fowler Memorial Clock, Quay Street	Ullapool			57°53′46″N 5°09′37″W	Category B	7791	Upload another image See more images
Garden Cottage/Guest House, Dundonnel House	Dundonnell			57°49′23″N 5°10′55″W	Category C(S)	7758	Upload Photo
Caledonian Macbrayne and Tourist Office, West Shore Street	Ullapool			57°53′43″N 5°09′39″W	Category C(S)	7765	Upload another image
Isle Martin, Macleod's House	Isle Martin			57°56′22″N 5°13′03″W	Category C(S)	50859	Upload another image
Ullapool 4 (L) And 5 (R) Custom House Street	Ullapool			57°53′55″N 5°09′30″W	Category C(S)	7786	Upload another image
Ice House, Braemore House	Braemore			57°45′58″N 5°01′29″W	Category B	13315	Upload Photo
The Captain's Cabin, Quay Street	Ullapool			57°53′45″N 5°09′35″W	Category B	7792	Upload another image
Footbridge Over Abhainn Cuileig, Braemore Estate	Braemore			57°45′09″N 5°03′00″W	Category B	13316	Upload another image
Auchindrean Bridge, Over River Broom	Braemore			57°46′43″N 5°02′11″W	Category A	7754	Upload another image See more images
Ullapool Argyle Street Former Ullapool Parish Church And Burial Ground	Ullapool			57°53′45″N 5°09′44″W	Category A	7764	Upload another image See more images
Ullapool, West Shore Street, Ornsay House	Ullapool			57°53′43″N 5°09′40″W	Category C(S)	7787	Upload Photo
Garden Ballroom, Dundonnel House	Dundonnell			57°49′23″N 5°10′48″W	Category B	7759	Upload Photo
Fishing Station and Quay	Tanera Mòr			58°00′36″N 5°24′15″W	Category B	7766	Upload another image
Achiltibuie Former Mill	Achiltibuie			58°01′35″N 5°21′24″W	Category C(S)	7753	Upload Photo
Inverbroom Glenview (Former Church Of Scotland Parish Manse)	Inverbroom			57°48′56″N 5°04′21″W	Category C(S)	7761	Upload Photo

== Key ==
The scheme for classifying buildings in Scotland is:

- Category A: "buildings of national or international importance, either architectural or historic; or fine, little-altered examples of some particular period, style or building type."
- Category B: "buildings of regional or more than local importance; or major examples of some particular period, style or building type, which may have been altered."
- Category C: "buildings of local importance; lesser examples of any period, style, or building type, as originally constructed or moderately altered; and simple traditional buildings which group well with other listed buildings."

In March 2016 there were 47,288 listed buildings in Scotland. Of these, 8% were Category A, and 50% were Category B, with the remaining 42% being Category C.

== See also ==
- List of listed buildings in Highland
