= List of listed buildings in Dores, Highland =

This is a list of listed buildings in the parish of Dores in Highland, Scotland.

== List ==
Name	Location	Date Listed	Grid Ref. (Note: Sometimes known as OSGB36, the grid reference (where provided) is based on the British national grid reference system used by the Ordnance Survey. • "Guide to National Grid". Ordnance Survey. • "Get-a-map". Ordnance Survey.)	Geo-coordinates	Notes	LB Number (Note: Historic Environment Scotland assign a unique alphanumeric identifier to each designated site in Scotland, for listed buildings this always begins with "LB", for example "LB12345".)	Image
Gorthleck House				57°15′23″N 4°24′52″W	Category C(S)	541	Upload Photo
Tigh-Na-Coille (Former Free Church Of Scotland Manse) And Steading				57°23′33″N 4°18′47″W	Category B	544	Upload Photo
Abersky, Old Farmhouse				57°18′40″N 4°19′51″W	Category B	534	Upload Photo
Aldourie Castle				57°24′13″N 4°19′47″W	Category A	535	Upload another image See more images
Dores Parish Church Of Scotland, Sunday School Room (Former Watch-House) Burial Ground And War Memorial Entrance				57°23′02″N 4°19′44″W	Category C(S)	537	Upload Photo
Farraline House, Walled Garden				57°15′56″N 4°22′52″W	Category B	540	Upload Photo
Errogie, Former United Free Church Including Boundary Walls				57°16′16″N 4°23′05″W	Category C(S)	50029	Upload Photo
Errogie, Corrugated-Iron Cottage				57°16′15″N 4°23′06″W	Category C(S)	50031	Upload Photo
Aldourie Castle Rustic Gate Piers				57°24′04″N 4°19′41″W	Category C(S)	536	Upload Photo
Leadclune				57°18′01″N 4°22′51″W	Category C(S)	543	Upload Photo
Gorthleck Mains (Old Gorthleck)				57°15′37″N 4°24′29″W	Category B	542	Upload Photo
Dores Village, Drumashie Lodge (Former Church Of Scotland Manse) And Steading				57°22′58″N 4°19′50″W	Category C(S)	538	Upload Photo
Farraline House				57°15′56″N 4°22′52″W	Category B	539	Upload Photo

== Key ==
The scheme for classifying buildings in Scotland is:

- Category A: "buildings of national or international importance, either architectural or historic; or fine, little-altered examples of some particular period, style or building type."
- Category B: "buildings of regional or more than local importance; or major examples of some particular period, style or building type, which may have been altered."
- Category C: "buildings of local importance; lesser examples of any period, style, or building type, as originally constructed or moderately altered; and simple traditional buildings which group well with other listed buildings."

In March 2016 there were 47,288 listed buildings in Scotland. Of these, 8% were Category A, and 50% were Category B, with the remaining 42% being Category C.

== See also ==
- List of listed buildings in Highland
