= List of listed buildings in Bower, Highland =

This is a list of listed buildings in the parish of Bower in Highland, Scotland.

== List ==
Name	Location	Date Listed	Grid Ref. (Note: Sometimes known as OSGB36, the grid reference (where provided) is based on the British national grid reference system used by the Ordnance Survey. • "Guide to National Grid". Ordnance Survey. • "Get-a-map". Ordnance Survey.)	Geo-coordinates	Notes	LB Number (Note: Historic Environment Scotland assign a unique alphanumeric identifier to each designated site in Scotland, for listed buildings this always begins with "LB", for example "LB12345".)	Image
Stemster House				58°31′43″N 3°24′14″W	Category B	589	Upload Photo
Stemster Dovecote And Memorial				58°31′49″N 3°24′16″W	Category C(S)	590	Upload Photo
Barrock House Gate Lodge				58°33′01″N 3°13′38″W	Category C(S)	595	Upload Photo
Barrock Mains Steading				58°32′43″N 3°14′04″W	Category C(S)	585	Upload Photo
Bower Parish Church (Church Of Scotland)				58°32′27″N 3°18′36″W	Category B	586	Upload Photo
Lyth Bridge Over The Burn Of Lyth				58°32′49″N 3°12′45″W	Category C(S)	587	Upload Photo
Barrock House				58°32′46″N 3°13′51″W	Category B	594	Upload Photo

== Key ==
The scheme for classifying buildings in Scotland is:

- Category A: "buildings of national or international importance, either architectural or historic; or fine, little-altered examples of some particular period, style or building type."
- Category B: "buildings of regional or more than local importance; or major examples of some particular period, style or building type, which may have been altered."
- Category C: "buildings of local importance; lesser examples of any period, style, or building type, as originally constructed or moderately altered; and simple traditional buildings which group well with other listed buildings."

In March 2016 there were 47,288 listed buildings in Scotland. Of these, 8% were Category A, and 50% were Category B, with the remaining 42% being Category C.

== See also ==
- List of listed buildings in Highland
