= List of listed buildings in Ardnamurchan =

This is a list of listed buildings in the parish of Ardnamurchan in Highland, Scotland.

== List ==
| Name | Location | Date Listed | Grid Ref. (Note: Sometimes known as OSGB36, the grid reference (where provided) is based on the British national grid reference system used by the Ordnance Survey. • "Guide to National Grid". Ordnance Survey. • "Get-a-map". Ordnance Survey.) | Geo-coordinates | Notes | LB Number (Note: Historic Environment Scotland assign a unique alphanumeric identifier to each designated site in Scotland, for listed buildings this always begins with "LB", for example "LB12345".) | Image |
|---|---|---|---|---|---|---|---|
| Strontian, Drumnatorran Bridge Over Strontian River | | | | 56°42′09″N 5°34′08″W | Category C(S) | 510 | Upload Photo |
| Glenborrodale Castle Hotel, Garden Terraces, Stables And Walled Garden | | | | 56°40′40″N 5°54′40″W | Category A | 524 | Upload another image |
| Strontian, Strontian Hotel | | | | 56°41′34″N 5°34′06″W | Category B | 514 | Upload another image |
| Glenborrodale Castle Hotel, Gate Lodge And Gate Piers | | | | 56°40′38″N 5°54′38″W | Category B | 525 | Upload Photo |
| Kilchoan, Old Parish Church And Burial Ground | | | | 56°42′00″N 6°06′36″W | Category B | 508 | Upload Photo |
| Kilchoan, Church Of Scotland Manse, Garden Walls And Steading | | | | 56°41′57″N 6°06′37″W | Category B | 509 | Upload Photo |
| Strontian, Drumnatorran Farmhouse | | | | 56°42′12″N 5°33′48″W | Category C(S) | 511 | Upload Photo |
| Strontian, The Old Manse (Former Church Of Scotland Manse) | | | | 56°42′34″N 5°33′49″W | Category C(S) | 513 | Upload Photo |
| Fascadale Bay, Ice House | | | | 56°45′40″N 6°05′30″W | Category C(S) | 523 | Upload Photo |
| Archaracle Church Of Scotland Parish Church And Burial Grounds | | | | 56°44′55″N 5°48′13″W | Category B | 519 | Upload another image |
| Ardnamurchan Lighthouse, Keepers' Houses, Sundial Former Steading And Enclosing Perimeter Wall | | | | 56°43′38″N 6°13′36″W | Category A | 521 | Upload another image |
| By Glenborrodale, Camus Nan Geall Burial Ground | | | | 56°41′04″N 5°59′06″W | Category B | 526 | Upload Photo |
| Kilchoan, Ardnamurchan Parish Church Of Scotland And Enclosing Walls | | | | 56°41′54″N 6°06′15″W | Category B | 507 | Upload Photo |
| Strontian, Village Shop And Post Office | | | | 56°41′29″N 5°34′05″W | Category B | 515 | Upload another image |
| Kilchoan, Mingary Castle | | | | 56°41′34″N 6°04′49″W | Category A | 527 | Upload another image |
| Strontian, Drumnatorran Steading | | | | 56°42′13″N 5°33′44″W | Category B | 512 | Upload Photo |
| Archaracle, Old Manse | | | | 56°44′50″N 5°48′08″W | Category B | 520 | Upload Photo |
| Achateny House | | | | 56°45′22″N 6°03′21″W | Category C(S) | 522 | Upload Photo |

== Key ==
The scheme for classifying buildings in Scotland is:

- Category A: "buildings of national or international importance, either architectural or historic; or fine, little-altered examples of some particular period, style or building type."
- Category B: "buildings of regional or more than local importance; or major examples of some particular period, style or building type, which may have been altered."
- Category C: "buildings of local importance; lesser examples of any period, style, or building type, as originally constructed or moderately altered; and simple traditional buildings which group well with other listed buildings."

In March 2016 there were 47,288 listed buildings in Scotland. Of these, 8% were Category A, and 50% were Category B, with the remaining 42% being Category C.

== See also ==
- List of listed buildings in Highland
