= List of listed buildings in Kilmallie, Highland =

This is a list of listed buildings in the parish of Kilmallie in Highland, Scotland.

== Key ==
The scheme for classifying buildings in Scotland is:

- Category A: "buildings of national or international importance, either architectural or historic; or fine, little-altered examples of some particular period, style or building type."
- Category B: "buildings of regional or more than local importance; or major examples of some particular period, style or building type, which may have been altered."
- Category C: "buildings of local importance; lesser examples of any period, style, or building type, as originally constructed or moderately altered; and simple traditional buildings which group well with other listed buildings."

In March 2016 there were 47,288 listed buildings in Scotland. Of these, 8% were Category A, and 50% were Category B, with the remaining 42% being Category C.

== List ==
Name	Location	Date listed	Grid ref. (Note: Sometimes known as OSGB36, the grid reference (where provided) is based on the British national grid reference system used by the Ordnance Survey. • "Guide to National Grid". Ordnance Survey. • "Get-a-map". Ordnance Survey.)	Geo-coordinates	Notes	LB number (Note: Historic Environment Scotland assign a unique alphanumeric identifier to each designated site in Scotland, for listed buildings this always begins with "LB", for example "LB12345".)	Image
Fassfern House, Steading Ranges And Rear Walled Garden				56°51′28″N 5°14′52″W	Category B	7069	Upload Photo
Kinlocheil, Snowburn Steading				56°51′37″N 5°19′36″W	Category C(S)	7074	Upload Photo
Callert Barn				56°41′47″N 5°07′04″W	Category B	7092	Upload Photo
Kiachnish Bridge (Old) Over River Kiachnish Near Coruanan				56°46′23″N 5°09′53″W	Category B	7071	Upload Photo
Loy Bridge Over River Loy				56°53′27″N 5°02′29″W	Category B	7075	Upload another image
Onich, Walled Garden Cuilcheanna House				56°42′18″N 5°14′09″W	Category B	7076	Upload Photo
Caledonian Canal, Corpach, Former Storehouse				56°50′32″N 5°07′23″W	Category B	7083	Upload Photo
Caledonian Canal, Moy Swing Bridge Keeper's Cottage And Garden Walls				56°53′55″N 5°01′08″W	Category B	7088	Upload Photo
Caledonian Canal, Torcastle Aqueduct Over The Allt Sheangain				56°51′58″N 5°03′59″W	Category A	7090	Upload another image See more images
Achnacarry. Chia-Aig Bridge. Over Abhainn Chia-Aig				56°57′17″N 5°00′05″W	Category B	7100	Upload another image See more images
North Ballachulish, Dunbeg House Including Gatepiers And Boundary Walls				56°41′34″N 5°10′22″W	Category B	50833	Upload Photo
Onich, Old Manse Garden Wall And Gatepiers. (Former North Ballachulish Church Of Scotland Manse)				56°42′11″N 5°13′01″W	Category C(S)	7078	Upload Photo
Corpach, Kilmallie Parish Church Of Scotland Enclosing Wall With Gate Piers And Cameron Memorial				56°50′41″N 5°07′53″W	Category C(S)	7094	Upload Photo
Fassfern Bridge Over The An T-Suileag Burn				56°51′35″N 5°14′51″W	Category C(S)	7070	Upload another image
Caledonian Canal, Banavie, Neptune's Staircase, Lock Cottage, (Lock Keepers' House)				56°50′48″N 5°05′38″W	Category B	7081	Upload Photo
Caledonian Canal, Aqueduct Over The River Loy				56°53′25″N 5°02′23″W	Category A	7085	Upload another image See more images
St Cian's Church Of Scotland, Achnacarry				56°56′28″N 4°59′30″W	Category B	7099	Upload another image See more images
Corpach, Obelisk				56°50′39″N 5°07′56″W	Category B	7066	Upload another image
Corpach, Kilmallie House				56°50′36″N 5°07′32″W	Category B	7067	Upload Photo
Caledonian Canal Banavie, Neptune's Staircase, Former Smithy And Former Stables				56°50′46″N 5°05′37″W	Category C(S)	7080	Upload another image
Caledonian Canal, Corpach, 1, 2, Ardbeg (Lock Keepers' Cottages)				56°50′33″N 5°07′12″W	Category B	7084	Upload Photo
Achnacarry House Stables (Achnacarry Steading)				56°56′48″N 5°00′10″W	Category C(S)	7097	Upload another image
Kinlochiel Mission Church				56°51′28″N 5°18′34″W	Category C(S)	7073	Upload Photo
Onich, Nether Lochaber Episcopal Church Of St Bride And Burial Ground				56°42′01″N 5°11′00″W	Category C(S)	7077	Upload another image
Caledonian Canal, Banavie, Neptune's Staircase, Studio Salix				56°50′52″N 5°05′33″W	Category B	7082	Upload Photo
Caledonian Canal, Bank Cottage By Torcastle				56°52′16″N 5°03′37″W	Category B	7086	Upload Photo
Cameron Mausoleum, By Callert				56°41′25″N 5°09′03″W	Category B	7093	Upload another image See more images
Corpach, Icehouse				56°50′30″N 5°08′18″W	Category C(S)	7068	Upload Photo
Callert House				56°41′46″N 5°07′07″W	Category A	7091	Upload another image See more images
Kinlocheil, Druim Na Saille Bridge Over Fionn Lighe River				56°51′41″N 5°20′51″W	Category B	7072	Upload Photo
Caledonian Canal, Banavie, Swing Railway Bridge Over Caledonian Canal				56°50′39″N 5°05′50″W	Category B	7079	Upload Photo
Caledonian Canal, Mount Alexander Aqueduct Over Allt Mor				56°51′08″N 5°04′53″W	Category B	7087	Upload another image See more images
Caledonian Canal, Sluice By Carn Phail				56°53′08″N 5°02′24″W	Category A	7089	Upload another image
Corpach, Old Kilmallie Church And Burial Ground				56°50′40″N 5°07′57″W	Category C(S)	7095	Upload Photo
Achnacarry House (Achnacarry Castle)				56°56′49″N 4°59′57″W	Category B	7096	Upload another image See more images
Old Post Office (Clan Cameron Museum), Achnacarry				56°56′41″N 5°00′02″W	Category C(S)	7098	Upload another image

== See also ==
- List of listed buildings in Highland

== General references ==
- All entries, addresses and coordinates are based on data from Historic Scotland. This data falls under the Open Government Licence.
