= List of listed buildings in Kilmuir Easter, Highland =

This is a list of listed buildings in the parish of Kilmuir Easter in Highland, Scotland.

== List ==
Name	Location	Date Listed	Grid Ref. (Note: Sometimes known as OSGB36, the grid reference (where provided) is based on the British national grid reference system used by the Ordnance Survey. • "Guide to National Grid". Ordnance Survey. • "Get-a-map". Ordnance Survey.)	Geo-coordinates	Notes	LB Number (Note: Historic Environment Scotland assign a unique alphanumeric identifier to each designated site in Scotland, for listed buildings this always begins with "LB", for example "LB12345".)	Image
Milton Church				57°44′26″N 4°04′22″W	Category C(S)	7879	Upload Photo
Tarbat House And Stables				57°44′07″N 4°04′02″W	Category A	7848	Upload another image See more images
Balnagown Farmhouse (At Balnagown Mains)				57°44′51″N 4°05′05″W	Category B	7868	Upload Photo
Milton Mill				57°44′26″N 4°04′17″W	Category B	7880	Upload Photo
Balintraid Pier				57°42′42″N 4°06′50″W	Category C(S)	7842	Upload Photo
Balnagown Castle Entrance Gate Piers And Gates				57°44′41″N 4°04′57″W	Category C(S)	7871	Upload Photo
Kindeace House And Former Stables				57°43′55″N 4°08′33″W	Category C(S)	7877	Upload Photo
Milton Miller's House				57°44′26″N 4°04′19″W	Category C(S)	7881	Upload Photo
Milton Market Cross				57°44′24″N 4°04′22″W	Category B	7883	Upload another image
Milton The Old Shop				57°44′24″N 4°04′21″W	Category C(S)	7843	Upload Photo
Polnicol				57°43′48″N 4°05′36″W	Category B	7846	Upload Photo
Balnagown Barn (At Balnagown Mains) Gighouse And Byre				57°44′51″N 4°05′05″W	Category B	7869	Upload Photo
Balnagown Castle Walled Garden				57°45′03″N 4°05′18″W	Category B	7872	Upload Photo
Kilmuir Easter Parish Church (Church Of Scotland) And Burial Ground				57°43′53″N 4°05′17″W	Category A	7876	Upload another image See more images
Milton Milton House And Ord Cottage				57°44′25″N 4°04′20″W	Category C(S)	7882	Upload Photo
Milton Old Drovers' Inn				57°44′26″N 4°04′20″W	Category B	7844	Upload Photo
Strathrory Bridge				57°46′04″N 4°15′13″W	Category C(S)	7847	Upload another image See more images
Balnagown Castle				57°44′58″N 4°04′51″W	Category B	7866	Upload Photo
Balnagown Railway Viaduct (Over Balnagown River)				57°44′44″N 4°04′23″W	Category B	7874	Upload another image
Kildary Former Railway Station				57°44′39″N 4°04′34″W	Category B	7875	Upload Photo
Scotsburn Bridge Over Balnagown River				57°45′14″N 4°09′28″W	Category B	7845	Upload Photo
Balintraid Pier House				57°42′44″N 4°06′54″W	Category C(S)	7865	Upload Photo
Balnagown Castle Swiss Cottage				57°45′16″N 4°05′31″W	Category B	7873	Upload Photo
Kindeace House Gate Lodge And Gate Piers				57°43′49″N 4°08′05″W	Category B	7878	Upload Photo
Balnagown Stables				57°44′51″N 4°05′05″W	Category B	7867	Upload Photo
Balnagown Castle King James Bridge Over River Balnagown				57°45′03″N 4°05′01″W	Category B	7870	Upload Photo

== Key ==
The scheme for classifying buildings in Scotland is:

- Category A: "buildings of national or international importance, either architectural or historic; or fine, little-altered examples of some particular period, style or building type."
- Category B: "buildings of regional or more than local importance; or major examples of some particular period, style or building type, which may have been altered."
- Category C: "buildings of local importance; lesser examples of any period, style, or building type, as originally constructed or moderately altered; and simple traditional buildings which group well with other listed buildings."

In March 2016 there were 47,288 listed buildings in Scotland. Of these, 8% were Category A, and 50% were Category B, with the remaining 42% being Category C.

== See also ==
- List of listed buildings in Highland
