= List of listed buildings in Applecross, Highland =

This is a list of listed buildings in the parish of Applecross in Highland, Scotland.

== List ==
Name	Location	Date Listed	Grid Ref. (Note: Sometimes known as OSGB36, the grid reference (where provided) is based on the British national grid reference system used by the Ordnance Survey. • "Guide to National Grid". Ordnance Survey. • "Get-a-map". Ordnance Survey.)	Geo-coordinates	Notes	LB Number (Note: Historic Environment Scotland assign a unique alphanumeric identifier to each designated site in Scotland, for listed buildings this always begins with "LB", for example "LB12345".)	Image
Lonbain Thatched Cottage				57°30′28″N 5°51′51″W	Category B	427	Upload Photo
2-7 (Inclusive) Shore Street				57°25′57″N 5°48′58″W	Category C(S)	428	Upload Photo
13-17 (Inclusive) Shore Street				57°25′54″N 5°48′59″W	Category C(S)	430	Upload Photo
Lower Diabeg Pier And Store				57°34′29″N 5°41′10″W	Category B	433	Upload Photo
Applecross, Former Parish Manse (Church Of Scotland)				57°26′40″N 5°48′46″W	Category B	457	Upload Photo
Applecross House Gardener's Cottage And Walled Garden				57°26′37″N 5°48′05″W	Category C(S)	460	Upload Photo
8-12 (Inclusive) Shore Street				57°25′55″N 5°48′59″W	Category C(S)	429	Upload Photo
Applecross, Old Parish Church And Burial Ground				57°26′42″N 5°48′44″W	Category B	456	Upload another image
Inveralligin Wavecrest				57°33′23″N 5°36′16″W	Category C(S)	431	Upload Photo
Inveralligin Pier End Cottage And Byre				57°33′23″N 5°36′15″W	Category C(S)	432	Upload Photo
Shieldaig Kirkburn (Former Church Of Scotland Manse)				57°31′29″N 5°38′58″W	Category B	435	Upload Photo
Applecross Mains Top Barns				57°25′52″N 5°48′48″W	Category B	462	Upload Photo
By Shieldaig Camus An Eilein				57°33′34″N 5°45′31″W	Category C(S)	434	Upload Photo
Applecross, Camusterrach Manse (Church Of Scotland)				57°24′29″N 5°48′44″W	Category C(S)	458	Upload Photo
Applecross Estate Office Garden Walls And Boat House				57°26′01″N 5°48′54″W	Category B	461	Upload Photo
Applecross House				57°26′39″N 5°48′12″W	Category B	459	Upload Photo
Applecross Applecross Mains Steading				57°25′55″N 5°48′44″W	Category C(S)	425	Upload Photo
Applecross Applecross Mains Millpond Dam				57°25′53″N 5°48′42″W	Category C(S)	426	Upload Photo
Applecross Mains "Crac" Barn				57°25′56″N 5°48′41″W	Category B	463	Upload Photo

== Key ==
The scheme for classifying buildings in Scotland is:

- Category A: "buildings of national or international importance, either architectural or historic; or fine, little-altered examples of some particular period, style or building type."
- Category B: "buildings of regional or more than local importance; or major examples of some particular period, style or building type, which may have been altered."
- Category C: "buildings of local importance; lesser examples of any period, style, or building type, as originally constructed or moderately altered; and simple traditional buildings which group well with other listed buildings."

In March 2016 there were 47,288 listed buildings in Scotland. Of these, 8% were Category A, and 50% were Category B, with the remaining 42% being Category C.

== See also ==
- List of listed buildings in Highland
