= List of listed buildings in Rogart, Highland =

This is a list of listed buildings in the parish of Rogart in Highland, Scotland.

== List ==
Name	Location	Date listed	Geo-coordinates	Notes	Category	LB number	Image
Rogart, Former Church Of Scotland Manse And Walled Garden			58°00′09″N 4°08′10″W		B	17442	Upload Photo
Free Church Of Scotland, Pitfure			58°00′28″N 4°10′41″W		C(S)	14918	Upload Photo
St Callan's Church (Church Of Scotland) And Burial Ground			58°00′10″N 4°08′08″W		B	17441	Upload Photo
286, Rogart			57°59′23″N 4°09′22″W		C(S)	14915	Upload Photo
Free Church Of Scotland Manse			58°00′27″N 4°10′39″W		B	14914	Upload Photo
Dalreavoch Bridge Over River Brora			58°03′05″N 4°06′39″W		B	14917	Upload Photo

== Key ==
The scheme for classifying buildings in Scotland is:

- Category A: "buildings of national or international importance, either architectural or historic; or fine, little-altered examples of some particular period, style or building type."
- Category B: "buildings of regional or more than local importance; or major examples of some particular period, style or building type, which may have been altered."
- Category C: "buildings of local importance; lesser examples of any period, style, or building type, as originally constructed or moderately altered; and simple traditional buildings which group well with other listed buildings."

In March 2016 there were 47,288 listed buildings in Scotland. Of these, 8% were Category A, and 50% were Category B, with the remaining 42% being Category C.

== See also ==
- List of listed buildings in Highland
