= List of listed buildings in Strath, Highland =

This is a list of listed buildings in the parish of Strath in Highland, Scotland.

== List ==
Name	Location	Date listed	Grid ref. (Note: Sometimes known as OSGB36, the grid reference (where provided) is based on the British national grid reference system used by the Ordnance Survey. • "Guide to National Grid". Ordnance Survey. • "Get-a-map". Ordnance Survey.)	Geo-coordinates	Notes	LB number (Note: Historic Environment Scotland assign a unique alphanumeric identifier to each designated site in Scotland, for listed buildings this always begins with "LB", for example "LB12345".)	Image
Broadford Corry Lodge Coachhouse				57°14′55″N 5°54′30″W	Category B	13988	Upload Photo
Kyle House				57°16′26″N 5°44′35″W	Category B	13995	Upload Photo
6 Luib				57°16′30″N 6°02′36″W	Category B	13999	Upload Photo
Kilchrist Church And Graveyard				57°12′53″N 5°56′54″W	Category C(S)	13993	Upload Photo
Kilmarie Bridge				57°10′57″N 6°03′32″W	Category C(S)	13994	Upload Photo
Strollamus, Corran Cottage				57°16′09″N 5°58′21″W	Category C(S)	14001	Upload Photo
2 Luib				57°16′39″N 6°02′30″W	Category B	13996	Upload Photo
5 Luib Folk Museum				57°16′30″N 6°02′33″W	Category B	13998	Upload Photo
Strathaird House				57°11′14″N 6°03′19″W	Category C(S)	14000	Upload Photo
Broadford, Mackinnon's Pier (Opposite Corry Lodge)				57°14′52″N 5°54′24″W	Category B	13989	Upload another image
Broadford, Corry Lodge				57°14′56″N 5°54′33″W	Category C(S)	13987	Upload Photo
Broadford Limekiln				57°14′29″N 5°54′14″W	Category C(S)	13990	Upload Photo
Broadford Pier (By Limekiln)				57°14′31″N 5°54′15″W	Category C(S)	13991	Upload another image
Kilbride House				57°12′36″N 5°59′41″W	Category C(S)	13992	Upload Photo
Kylerhea Slipway (Kylerhea Ferry)				57°13′40″N 5°39′53″W	Category B	51413	Upload Photo

== Key ==
The scheme for classifying buildings in Scotland is:

- Category A: "buildings of national or international importance, either architectural or historic; or fine, little-altered examples of some particular period, style or building type."
- Category B: "buildings of regional or more than local importance; or major examples of some particular period, style or building type, which may have been altered."
- Category C: "buildings of local importance; lesser examples of any period, style, or building type, as originally constructed or moderately altered; and simple traditional buildings which group well with other listed buildings."

In March 2016 there were 47,288 listed buildings in Scotland. Of these, 8% were Category A, and 50% were Category B, with the remaining 42% being Category C.

== See also ==
- List of listed buildings in Highland
