= List of listed buildings in Ardgour, Highland =

This is a list of listed buildings in the parish of Ardgour in Highland, Scotland.

== List ==
Name	Location	Date Listed	Grid Ref. (Note: Sometimes known as OSGB36, the grid reference (where provided) is based on the British national grid reference system used by the Ordnance Survey. • "Guide to National Grid". Ordnance Survey. • "Get-a-map". Ordnance Survey.)	Geo-coordinates	Notes	LB Number (Note: Historic Environment Scotland assign a unique alphanumeric identifier to each designated site in Scotland, for listed buildings this always begins with "LB", for example "LB12345".)	Image
Ardgour, Ardgour Hotel				56°43′21″N 5°14′38″W	Category C(S)	1686	Upload Photo
Sallachan Bridge Over River Gour				56°42′50″N 5°18′19″W	Category B	1681	Upload Photo
Kingairloch, North Corry Farm House Including Stable, Barn And Gatepiers And Courtyard Wall				56°37′06″N 5°31′56″W	Category C(S)	48286	Upload Photo
Glencripesdale, Glencripesdale House				56°39′58″N 5°49′00″W	Category B	48285	Upload Photo
Glensanda Castle				56°33′47″N 5°32′36″W	Category B	4338	Upload Photo
Kingairloch, South Corry Steading				56°36′46″N 5°31′34″W	Category C(S)	1680	Upload Photo
Ardgour Parish Church (Church Of Scotland) And Burial Ground				56°43′37″N 5°15′11″W	Category B	1688	Upload another image See more images
Gorston Cottage (By Trislaig)				56°47′16″N 5°10′55″W	Category C(S)	1694	Upload Photo
Kilmalieu House				56°38′42″N 5°25′57″W	Category C(S)	1695	Upload Photo
Ardgour, Corran Narrows Lighthouse				56°43′15″N 5°14′32″W	Category C(S)	1689	Upload another image
Ardgour, Corran Narrows, Tigh Soluis (Former Lighthouse Keepers' Dwellings) And Garden Wall				56°43′15″N 5°14′34″W	Category C(S)	1690	Upload Photo
Ardgour, Corran Narrows, Store				56°43′17″N 5°14′34″W	Category C(S)	1691	Upload Photo
Blaich, Black Croft				56°50′38″N 5°13′00″W	Category B	1693	Upload Photo
Kilmalieu Steading/Barn				56°38′45″N 5°25′52″W	Category C(S)	1696	Upload Photo
Ardgour House				56°43′23″N 5°16′40″W	Category B	1687	Upload Photo
Blaich Church Of Scotland				56°50′37″N 5°11′43″W	Category C(S)	1692	Upload Photo

== Key ==
The scheme for classifying buildings in Scotland is:

- Category A: "buildings of national or international importance, either architectural or historic; or fine, little-altered examples of some particular period, style or building type."
- Category B: "buildings of regional or more than local importance; or major examples of some particular period, style or building type, which may have been altered."
- Category C: "buildings of local importance; lesser examples of any period, style, or building type, as originally constructed or moderately altered; and simple traditional buildings which group well with other listed buildings."

In March 2016 there were 47,288 listed buildings in Scotland. Of these, 8% were Category A, and 50% were Category B, with the remaining 42% being Category C.

== See also ==
- List of listed buildings in Highland
