= List of listed buildings in Avoch, Highland =

This is a list of listed buildings in the parish of Avoch in Highland, Scotland.

== List ==
Name	Location	Date Listed	Grid Ref. (Note: Sometimes known as OSGB36, the grid reference (where provided) is based on the British national grid reference system used by the Ordnance Survey. • "Guide to National Grid". Ordnance Survey. • "Get-a-map". Ordnance Survey.)	Geo-coordinates	Notes	LB Number (Note: Historic Environment Scotland assign a unique alphanumeric identifier to each designated site in Scotland, for listed buildings this always begins with "LB", for example "LB12345".)	Image
34 Dock, Maji Cottage	Avoch Village			57°33′57″N 4°10′23″W	Category B	5275	Upload Photo
Grays Cottage	Rosehaugh Estate			57°34′25″N 4°12′52″W	Category B	378	Upload another image
4A,4B And 5 John Street	Avoch Village			57°34′01″N 4°10′12″W	Category C(S)	387	Upload Photo
12 Margaret Street	Avoch Village			57°34′00″N 4°10′16″W	Category C(S)	394	Upload Photo
3 George Street	Avoch Village			57°33′59″N 4°10′16″W	Category C(S)	406	Upload Photo
46-53 Henrietta Street	Avoch Village			57°33′49″N 4°10′29″W	Category B	412	Upload another image
36 High Street	Avoch Village			57°34′02″N 4°10′17″W	Category C(S)	422	Upload Photo
Braehead, Avoch Parish Church	Avoch Village			57°34′06″N 4°10′23″W	Category B	439	Upload another image See more images
Braehead Hill House (Former Manse Of Parish Church), Stables, Dyke And Gate Piers	Avoch Village			57°34′05″N 4°10′20″W	Category B	441	Upload Photo
The Dairy	Rosehaugh Estate			57°34′18″N 4°12′21″W	Category A	374	Upload another image See more images
17 Margaret Street	Avoch Village			57°34′01″N 4°10′17″W	Category C(S)	5105	Upload Photo
Former Wine Store	Rosehaugh Estate			57°34′22″N 4°12′47″W	Category C(S)	385	Upload Photo
4 John Street (Reid)	Avoch Village			57°34′00″N 4°10′12″W	Category C(S)	386	Upload Photo
Mackenzie Place Headmaster's House And School (Formerly Mackenzie Foundation School)	Avoch Village			57°34′06″N 4°10′34″W	Category B	390	Upload Photo
3 Seatown Cottages (Otherwise 3 Factory Lane)	Avoch Village			57°33′58″N 4°10′16″W	Category C(S)	397	Upload Photo
5 Seatown Cottages (Otherwise 5 Factory Lane)	Avoch Village			57°33′57″N 4°10′16″W	Category C(S)	399	Upload Photo
9 Shore Street, (Eildan)	Avoch Village			57°33′58″N 4°10′16″W	Category C(S)	400	Upload Photo
5 High Street (Previously Nos 4 And 5)	Avoch Village			57°34′02″N 4°10′16″W	Category C(S)	414	Upload Photo
12 High Street	Avoch Village			57°34′02″N 4°10′13″W	Category C(S)	416	Upload Photo
33 High Street	Avoch Village			57°34′02″N 4°10′10″W	Category C(S)	421	Upload Photo
Rosehaugh The Laundry	Rosehaugh Estate			57°34′23″N 4°13′15″W	Category B	380	Upload Photo
2 Margaret Street The Little Small House	Avoch Village			57°34′01″N 4°10′16″W	Category C(S)	392	Upload Photo
4 Seatown Cottages (Otherwise 4 Factory Lane)	Avoch Village			57°33′58″N 4°10′16″W	Category C(S)	398	Upload Photo
7 High Street (Previously Nos 6 And 7)	Avoch Village			57°34′02″N 4°10′15″W	Category C(S)	415	Upload Photo
27 High Street	Avoch Village			57°34′03″N 4°10′03″W	Category C(S)	419	Upload Photo
Avoch Village1 And 2 James Street	Avoch Village			57°34′01″N 4°10′14″W	Category C(S)	423	Upload Photo
The Burnthouse	Rosehaugh Estate			57°34′23″N 4°10′59″W	Category C(S)	373	Upload Photo
Lodge, Gatepiers And Gates	Rosehaugh Estate			57°33′42″N 4°13′05″W	Category B	381	Upload Photo
15 Margaret Street	Avoch Village			57°34′01″N 4°10′16″W	Category C(S)	396	Upload Photo
1 And 2 George Street	Avoch Village			57°33′59″N 4°10′16″W	Category C(S)	405	Upload Photo
41, 42 And 43 Henrietta Street	Avoch Village			57°33′54″N 4°10′26″W	Category C(S)	410	Upload Photo
2 Alexander Street	Avoch Village			57°34′01″N 4°10′11″W	Category C(S)	437	Upload Photo
16 Margaret Street	Avoch Village			57°34′01″N 4°10′16″W	Category C(S)	5104	Upload Photo
Powerhouse	Rosehaugh Estate			57°34′10″N 4°12′58″W	Category C(S)	382	Upload Photo
Stable Cottage	Rosehaugh Estate			57°34′19″N 4°12′49″W	Category C(S)	383	Upload Photo
2 John Street	Avoch Village			57°34′01″N 4°10′12″W	Category C(S)	388	Upload Photo
Long Road, Burnside	Avoch Village			57°34′00″N 4°10′27″W	Category C(S)	389	Upload Photo
4 And 5 Margaret Street	Avoch Village			57°34′01″N 4°10′15″W	Category C(S)	393	Upload Photo
13 And 14 Margaret Street	Avoch Village			57°34′00″N 4°10′16″W	Category C(S)	395	Upload Photo
11 Shore Street	Avoch Village			57°33′57″N 4°10′16″W	Category C(S)	401	Upload Photo
Toll Road Avoch Football Ground Gate Piers And Gates	Avoch Village			57°34′01″N 4°10′32″W	Category C(S)	402	Upload another image
High Street Congregation Manse	Avoch Village			57°34′03″N 4°10′19″W	Category C(S)	413	Upload Photo
29 And 30 High Street	Avoch Village			57°34′03″N 4°10′02″W	Category C(S)	420	Upload Photo
Bridge Over Killen Burn	Rosehaugh Estate			57°34′08″N 4°12′38″W	Category C(S)	372	Upload another image
The Kennels Cottage	Rosehaugh Estate			57°34′29″N 4°12′44″W	Category C(S)	379	Upload Photo
Stables	Rosehaugh Estate			57°34′20″N 4°12′49″W	Category B	384	Upload another image
Toll Road Former Free Church (Now Village Hall)	Avoch Village			57°34′00″N 4°10′39″W	Category B	403	Upload Photo
George Street Tigh-Na-Mara	Avoch Village			57°33′59″N 4°10′16″W	Category C(S)	407	Upload Photo
Harbour	Avoch Village			57°34′02″N 4°10′04″W	Category B	408	Upload Photo
1 John Street	Avoch Village			57°34′01″N 4°10′12″W	Category C(S)	424	Upload Photo
Bridge Street Station Hotel	Avoch Village			57°34′02″N 4°10′23″W	Category C(S)	442	Upload Photo
Bridge Street, Avoch Hotel And "The Old Kennels", Facing Long Road	Avoch Village			57°34′02″N 4°10′25″W	Category C(S)	443	Upload Photo
Fletcher Burial Enclosure	Rosehaugh Estate			57°34′27″N 4°12′43″W	Category B	375	Upload another image See more images
Garden House	Rosehaugh Estate			57°34′23″N 4°12′15″W	Category B	376	Upload another image
Bridge (Near Garden House)	Rosehaugh Estate			57°34′22″N 4°12′11″W	Category C(S)	404	Upload another image
Henrietta Bridge	Avoch Village			57°33′54″N 4°10′25″W	Category C(S)	409	Upload another image See more images
45 Henrietta Street	Avoch Village			57°33′51″N 4°10′27″W	Category B	411	Upload Photo
High Street, Glencoe	Avoch Village			57°34′02″N 4°10′10″W	Category B	417	Upload Photo
High Street, Shipchandlers	Avoch Village			57°34′03″N 4°10′06″W	Category C(S)	418	Upload Photo
3 Alexander Street	Avoch Village			57°34′01″N 4°10′11″W	Category C(S)	438	Upload Photo
Braehead Avoch Parish Churchyard	Avoch Village			57°34′06″N 4°10′24″W	Category B	440	Upload Photo
Garden Walls	Rosehaugh Estate			57°34′23″N 4°12′21″W	Category C(S)	377	Upload Photo
1 Margaret Street	Avoch Village			57°34′02″N 4°10′16″W	Category C(S)	391	Upload Photo
1 Alexander Street	Avoch Village			57°34′01″N 4°10′10″W	Category C(S)	436	Upload Photo

== Key ==
The scheme for classifying buildings in Scotland is:

- Category A: "buildings of national or international importance, either architectural or historic; or fine, little-altered examples of some particular period, style or building type."
- Category B: "buildings of regional or more than local importance; or major examples of some particular period, style or building type, which may have been altered."
- Category C: "buildings of local importance; lesser examples of any period, style, or building type, as originally constructed or moderately altered; and simple traditional buildings which group well with other listed buildings."

In March 2016 there were 47,288 listed buildings in Scotland. Of these, 8% were Category A, and 50% were Category B, with the remaining 42% being Category C.

== See also ==
- List of listed buildings in Highland
