= List of listed buildings in Boleskine and Abertarff =

This is a list of listed buildings in the parish of Boleskine and Abertarff in Highland, Scotland.

== List ==
| Name | Location | Date Listed | Grid Ref. (Note: Sometimes known as OSGB36, the grid reference (where provided) is based on the British national grid reference system used by the Ordnance Survey. • "Guide to National Grid". Ordnance Survey. • "Get-a-map". Ordnance Survey.) | Geo-coordinates | Notes | LB Number (Note: Historic Environment Scotland assign a unique alphanumeric identifier to each designated site in Scotland, for listed buildings this always begins with "LB", for example "LB12345".) | Image |
|---|---|---|---|---|---|---|---|
| Foyers, Jane Fraser Memorial Obelisk | | | | 57°15′11″N 4°30′16″W | Category B | 1852 | Upload Photo |
| Caledonian Canal Cullochy Lock, Pair Lock Keepers' Houses (East Bank) | | | | 57°05′57″N 4°44′21″W | Category C(S) | 1853 | Upload Photo |
| Culachy House, Cottage And Steading Range | | | | 57°07′12″N 4°40′58″W | Category C(S) | 1858 | Upload Photo |
| Fort Augustus, Length Of High Rubble Wall To Rear Of Lovat Arms Hotel | | | | 57°08′37″N 4°40′58″W | Category B | 1864 | Upload Photo |
| Fort Augustus, Nos 1-10 (Inclusive) Lovat Terrace | | | | 57°08′37″N 4°41′05″W | Category B | 1868 | Upload Photo |
| Oich, Bridge Of, Over River Oich | | | | 57°05′34″N 4°44′48″W | Category B | 1873 | Upload Photo |
| Foyers, Upper Foyers, Bridge Over River Foyers | | | | 57°14′44″N 4°29′27″W | Category C(S) | 1882 | Upload Photo |
| Inverfarigaig (Old) Bridge Over River Farigaig | | | | 57°16′53″N 4°27′14″W | Category B | 1870 | Upload Photo |
| Whitebridge, Old Bridge Over River Foyers | | | | 57°12′15″N 4°30′10″W | Category A | 1874 | Upload another image See more images |
| Caledonian Canal, Abercalder Cottage (Swing Bridge Keeper's Cottage) | | | | 57°05′34″N 4°44′35″W | Category C(S) | 1878 | Upload Photo |
| Garthbeg | | | | 57°13′11″N 4°27′21″W | Category B | 1883 | Upload Photo |
| Glendoe, Bridge Over Allt An Reidhean | | | | 57°08′37″N 4°38′19″W | Category B | 1884 | Upload Photo |
| Foyers Hydroelectric Power Scheme And Former Aluminium Smelter, Loch Mhor Dam | | | | 57°13′48″N 4°27′55″W | Category C(S) | 51700 | Upload Photo |
| Boleskine Parish Church (Church Of Scotland) And Burial Ground | | | | 57°13′50″N 4°28′26″W | Category B | 1846 | Upload Photo |
| Boleskine, Old Boleskine Church, Burial Ground And Watch House | | | | 57°15′57″N 4°28′34″W | Category B | 1847 | Upload Photo |
| Culachy House | | | | 57°07′16″N 4°40′58″W | Category B | 1857 | Upload another image See more images |
| Fort Augustus, Old Bridge Over River Oich | | | | 57°08′48″N 4°40′41″W | Category B | 1865 | Upload another image See more images |
| Fort Augustus, Road Bridge Carrying The A82 Over River Oich | | | | 57°08′44″N 4°40′52″W | Category B | 1866 | Upload Photo |
| By Whitebridge, Knockie Lodge Hotel | | | | 57°11′02″N 4°34′22″W | Category C(S) | 1876 | Upload Photo |
| Foyers Mains Steading | | | | 57°15′02″N 4°30′00″W | Category C(S) | 1879 | Upload Photo |
| Fort Augustus, Former Railway Bridge Over Canal Side Road | | | | 57°08′41″N 4°41′08″W | Category C(S) | 44608 | Upload another image |
| Ardachy Bridge Over River Tarff | | | | 57°07′46″N 4°40′42″W | Category B | 1845 | Upload Photo |
| Boleskine Old Manse | | | | 57°13′39″N 4°28′37″W | Category B | 1848 | Upload Photo |
| Boleskine House Stables | | | | 57°15′57″N 4°28′25″W | Category B | 1850 | Upload Photo |
| Caledonian Canal, Cullochy Lock, Lock Keeper's Cottage (West Bank) | | | | 57°05′56″N 4°44′24″W | Category C(S) | 1855 | Upload Photo |
| Glendoe, Bridge Carrying Re-Aligned A862 Over Allt Doe | | | | 57°08′31″N 4°37′54″W | Category C(S) | 1869 | Upload Photo |
| Foyers Hydroelectric Power Scheme And Former Aluminium Smelter, River Tarff Intake | | | | 57°14′44″N 4°29′20″W | Category C(S) | 51701 | Upload Photo |
| Culachy House, Bridge Carrying Drive To House Over Sunken Farm Track | | | | 57°07′26″N 4°41′02″W | Category B | 1859 | Upload another image |
| Oich, Old Bridge Over River Oich | | | | 57°05′36″N 4°44′43″W | Category A | 1872 | Upload another image |
| Boleskine House Gate Lodge And Gate Piers With Gates | | | | 57°16′00″N 4°28′27″W | Category B | 1877 | Upload Photo |
| Foyers, Lower Foyers Bridge Over River Foyers | | | | 57°15′11″N 4°29′47″W | Category B | 1881 | Upload Photo |
| Glendoe, Old Bridge Over Allt Doe | | | | 57°08′32″N 4°37′55″W | Category B | 1885 | Upload Photo |
| Fort Augustus Abbey, Gate Lodge | | | | 57°08′37″N 4°40′44″W | Category B | 1863 | Upload Photo |
| Fort Augustus, Former Engine And Gunpowder House | | | | 57°08′40″N 4°40′50″W | Category B | 1867 | Upload Photo |
| Whitebridge, New Bridge | | | | 57°12′15″N 4°30′10″W | Category B | 1875 | Upload Photo |
| Foyers Hydroelectric Power Scheme, Former Aluminium Smelter, Powerhouse And Smelter | | | | 57°15′19″N 4°29′35″W | Category A | 1880 | Upload Photo |
| Abercalder, Railway Cottage (L) And Mo Dhachaidh (R) | | | | 57°05′50″N 4°43′51″W | Category C(S) | 1844 | Upload Photo |
| By Fort Augustus, Lochunagan | | | | 57°07′47″N 4°41′28″W | Category B | 1851 | Upload Photo |
| Dell Lodge And Rear Service Cottages | | | | 57°12′44″N 4°30′31″W | Category B | 1860 | Upload Photo |
| Fort Augustus Abbey Church | | | | 57°08′41″N 4°40′36″W | Category A | 1862 | Upload Photo |
| Inverfarigaig Pier | | | | 57°16′46″N 4°27′41″W | Category B | 1871 | Upload Photo |
| Boleskine House | | | | 57°15′55″N 4°28′29″W | Category B | 1849 | Upload Photo |
| Caledonian Canal, Cullochy Lock, Storehouse (East Bank) | | | | 57°05′54″N 4°44′21″W | Category B | 1854 | Upload Photo |
| Corrieyairack Pass, Bridge Over Allt Coire Uchdachan | | | | 57°03′57″N 4°39′09″W | Category B | 1856 | Upload Photo |
| Fort Augustus Abbey, Monastery And School | | | | 57°08′41″N 4°40′36″W | Category A | 1861 | Upload another image |

== Key ==
The scheme for classifying buildings in Scotland is:

- Category A: "buildings of national or international importance, either architectural or historic; or fine, little-altered examples of some particular period, style or building type."
- Category B: "buildings of regional or more than local importance; or major examples of some particular period, style or building type, which may have been altered."
- Category C: "buildings of local importance; lesser examples of any period, style, or building type, as originally constructed or moderately altered; and simple traditional buildings which group well with other listed buildings."

In March 2016 there were 47,288 listed buildings in Scotland. Of these, 8% were Category A, and 50% were Category B, with the remaining 42% being Category C.

== See also ==
- List of listed buildings in Highland
