= List of listed buildings in Alvie, Highland =

This is a list of listed buildings in the parish of Alvie in Highland, Scotland.

== List ==
Name	Location	Date Listed	Grid Ref. (Note: Sometimes known as OSGB36, the grid reference (where provided) is based on the British national grid reference system used by the Ordnance Survey. • "Guide to National Grid". Ordnance Survey. • "Get-a-map". Ordnance Survey.)	Geo-coordinates	Notes	LB Number (Note: Historic Environment Scotland assign a unique alphanumeric identifier to each designated site in Scotland, for listed buildings this always begins with "LB", for example "LB12345".)	Image
Balavil House				57°05′57″N 3°59′50″W	Category B	1652	Upload Photo
Kincraig House, Baden Cottage				57°07′52″N 3°56′33″W	Category C(S)	1675	Upload Photo
Kincraig, Feshiebridge, Dalnavert Farmhouse And Steading				57°08′06″N 3°53′19″W	Category C(S)	50843	Upload Photo
St Drostan's Church				57°07′03″N 3°56′45″W	Category B	4337	Upload Photo
Alvie House Including Estate Office (Former Laundry) And Motor House				57°08′40″N 3°55′00″W	Category B	49689	Upload Photo
Kincraig, Former Meadowside Hospital				57°06′30″N 3°58′02″W	Category B	6409	Upload Photo
Alvie Manse (Former Church Of Scotland Manse) And Steading				57°09′38″N 3°52′51″W	Category C(S)	1651	Upload Photo
Balavil, Bridge Over Raitts Burn				57°05′50″N 4°00′06″W	Category C(S)	1653	Upload Photo
Kincraig, Boat Of Insh Bridge Over River Spey				57°07′35″N 3°55′34″W	Category B	1673	Upload Photo
Kinrara House				57°09′00″N 3°51′36″W	Category B	1676	Upload Photo
Kinrara Duchess Of Gordon's Monument				57°08′46″N 3°52′16″W	Category B	1678	Upload Photo
Balavil, East Lodge And Gate Piers				57°05′58″N 3°59′20″W	Category C(S)	1670	Upload Photo
Balavil Mains And Former Steading				57°05′44″N 3°59′55″W	Category B	1654	Upload Photo
Balavil, West Lodge And Gate Piers				57°05′35″N 4°00′02″W	Category C(S)	1671	Upload Photo
Kincraig House And Meat Larder				57°07′57″N 3°56′25″W	Category B	1674	Upload Photo
Alvie Parish Church And Burial Ground Church Of Scotland				57°09′39″N 3°52′47″W	Category B	1650	Upload Photo
Kinrara Duke Of Gordon's Monument				57°09′26″N 3°51′28″W	Category B	1677	Upload another image
Loch Alvie Bridge On B1952				57°09′38″N 3°52′09″W	Category C(S)	50909	Upload Photo
Balavil, Obelisk And Burial Ground				57°05′36″N 4°00′08″W	Category B	1655	Upload Photo
Dunachton, West Lodge				57°06′57″N 3°56′49″W	Category B	1672	Upload Photo
Kinrara Waterloo Cairn				57°09′17″N 3°51′55″W	Category B	1679	Upload Photo

== Key ==
The scheme for classifying buildings in Scotland is:

- Category A: "buildings of national or international importance, either architectural or historic; or fine, little-altered examples of some particular period, style or building type."
- Category B: "buildings of regional or more than local importance; or major examples of some particular period, style or building type, which may have been altered."
- Category C: "buildings of local importance; lesser examples of any period, style, or building type, as originally constructed or moderately altered; and simple traditional buildings which group well with other listed buildings."

In March 2016 there were 47,288 listed buildings in Scotland. Of these, 8% were Category A, and 50% were Category B, with the remaining 42% being Category C.

== See also ==
- List of listed buildings in Highland
