= List of listed buildings in Kirkhill, Highland =

This is a list of listed buildings in the parish of Kirkhill in Highland, Scotland.

== List ==
Name	Location	Date Listed	Grid Ref. (Note: Sometimes known as OSGB36, the grid reference (where provided) is based on the British national grid reference system used by the Ordnance Survey. • "Guide to National Grid". Ordnance Survey. • "Get-a-map". Ordnance Survey.)	Geo-coordinates	Notes	LB Number (Note: Historic Environment Scotland assign a unique alphanumeric identifier to each designated site in Scotland, for listed buildings this always begins with "LB", for example "LB12345".)	Image
Reelig House Gate Lodge And Gate Piers				57°27′46″N 4°24′43″W	Category C(S)	7822	Upload Photo
Kirkhill, Wardlaw House (Former Church Of Scotland Manse)				57°28′38″N 4°25′10″W	Category B	7814	Upload Photo
Kirkhill, Old Wardlaw Church With Lovat Burial Aisle And Burial Ground				57°28′42″N 4°25′14″W	Category A	7815	Upload another image
Newton House Dovecote				57°28′36″N 4°23′58″W	Category B	7819	Upload Photo
Achnagairn House				57°28′16″N 4°24′49″W	Category B	7807	Upload another image
Moniack Castle				57°27′35″N 4°24′56″W	Category B	7818	Upload another image
Reelig House And Walled Garden				57°27′35″N 4°24′15″W	Category B	7821	Upload another image
Birchwood, Lentran Muir Of Ord Greenhouse				57°30′59″N 4°17′37″W	Category C(S)	7824	Upload Photo
Dunballoch				57°28′12″N 4°27′51″W	Category B	7811	Upload Photo
Reelig Bridge Over The Moniack Burn				57°27′46″N 4°24′45″W	Category C(S)	7823	Upload another image
Balblair House				57°28′40″N 4°26′39″W	Category B	7810	Upload Photo
Lentran House				57°28′26″N 4°22′28″W	Category B	7817	Upload another image
Achnagairn, East Lodge				57°28′27″N 4°24′56″W	Category B	7808	Upload Photo
Phopachy				57°29′02″N 4°19′44″W	Category B	7820	Upload Photo
Achnagairn West Lodge				57°28′21″N 4°25′09″W	Category B	7809	Upload Photo
Englishton House				57°28′35″N 4°19′11″W	Category B	7812	Upload Photo
Kirkhill, Wardlaw Parish Church Of Scotland				57°28′33″N 4°24′53″W	Category B	7813	Upload Photo
Kirkton Burial Ground				57°28′32″N 4°19′38″W	Category C(S)	7816	Upload Photo

== Key ==
The scheme for classifying buildings in Scotland is:

- Category A: "buildings of national or international importance, either architectural or historic; or fine, little-altered examples of some particular period, style or building type."
- Category B: "buildings of regional or more than local importance; or major examples of some particular period, style or building type, which may have been altered."
- Category C: "buildings of local importance; lesser examples of any period, style, or building type, as originally constructed or moderately altered; and simple traditional buildings which group well with other listed buildings."

In March 2016 there were 47,288 listed buildings in Scotland. Of these, 8% were Category A, and 50% were Category B, with the remaining 42% being Category C.

== See also ==
- List of listed buildings in Highland
