= List of listed buildings in Loth, Highland =

This is a list of listed buildings in the parish of Loth in Highland, Scotland.

== List ==
Name	Location	Date Listed	Grid Ref. (Note: Sometimes known as OSGB36, the grid reference (where provided) is based on the British national grid reference system used by the Ordnance Survey. • "Guide to National Grid". Ordnance Survey. • "Get-a-map". Ordnance Survey.)	Geo-coordinates	Notes	LB Number (Note: Historic Environment Scotland assign a unique alphanumeric identifier to each designated site in Scotland, for listed buildings this always begins with "LB", for example "LB12345".)	Image
Kilmote				58°04′44″N 3°44′38″W	Category B	12372	Upload Photo
Loth Old Manse, Service Cottage And Steading				58°04′42″N 3°44′50″W	Category C(S)	7150	Upload Photo
Crackaig Steading				58°04′24″N 3°46′10″W	Category C(S)	7148	Upload Photo
Loth Parish Church (Church Of Scotland)				58°04′46″N 3°44′48″W	Category A	7149	Upload another image
Port Gower Inn				58°05′56″N 3°41′08″W	Category C(S)	7151	Upload Photo
Craikaig				58°04′22″N 3°46′09″W	Category C(S)	12371	Upload Photo
West Garty Lodge And Garden Wall				58°05′22″N 3°43′00″W	Category B	7152	Upload Photo

== Key ==
The scheme for classifying buildings in Scotland is:

- Category A: "buildings of national or international importance, either architectural or historic; or fine, little-altered examples of some particular period, style or building type."
- Category B: "buildings of regional or more than local importance; or major examples of some particular period, style or building type, which may have been altered."
- Category C: "buildings of local importance; lesser examples of any period, style, or building type, as originally constructed or moderately altered; and simple traditional buildings which group well with other listed buildings."

In March 2016 there were 47,288 listed buildings in Scotland. Of these, 8% were Category A, and 50% were Category B, with the remaining 42% being Category C.

== See also ==
- List of listed buildings in Highland
