= List of listed buildings in Kingussie and Insh =

This is a list of listed buildings in the parish of Kingussie and Insh in Highland, Scotland.

== List ==
| Name | Location | Date Listed | Grid Ref. (Note: Sometimes known as OSGB36, the grid reference (where provided) is based on the British national grid reference system used by the Ordnance Survey. • "Guide to National Grid". Ordnance Survey. • "Get-a-map". Ordnance Survey.) | Geo-coordinates | Notes | LB Number (Note: Historic Environment Scotland assign a unique alphanumeric identifier to each designated site in Scotland, for listed buildings this always begins with "LB", for example "LB12345".) | Image |
|---|---|---|---|---|---|---|---|
| Drumgluish Burnside And Byre | | | | 57°04′16″N 3°59′18″W | Category C(S) | 7666 | Upload Photo |
| By Ruthven Drochaid Balbh Bhordain Over Allt Na Feithe Moire | | | | 57°02′21″N 4°06′06″W | Category B | 7660 | Upload Photo |
| Newtonmore Railway Station | | | | 57°03′33″N 4°07′09″W | Category B | 7673 | Upload Photo |
| Dalwhinie, Wade Bridge Over River Truim | | | | 56°54′59″N 4°14′15″W | Category B | 7665 | Upload Photo |
| Newtonmore, Spey Bridge Over River Spey | | | | 57°03′18″N 4°07′50″W | Category B | 7674 | Upload Photo |
| Ruthven Barracks And Stables | | | | 57°04′20″N 4°02′21″W | Category A | 7659 | Upload another image |
| Crubenmore Bridge Over River Truim | | | | 56°59′39″N 4°10′48″W | Category B | 7664 | Upload Photo |
| Tromie Bridge | | | | 57°04′14″N 3°59′52″W | Category B | 7661 | Upload Photo |
| Feshiebridge, Bridge Over River Feshie | | | | 57°06′55″N 3°53′54″W | Category B | 7667 | Upload Photo |
| Insh Parish Church Of Scotland And Burial Ground | | | | 57°07′27″N 3°55′28″W | Category B | 7668 | Upload Photo |
| Insh House (Former Church Of Scotland Manse) | | | | 57°06′37″N 3°55′26″W | Category C(S) | 7669 | Upload Photo |
| Truim Bridge Over River Truim | | | | 57°01′36″N 4°09′41″W | Category B | 7662 | Upload Photo |
| Invereshie House Hotel | | | | 57°07′18″N 3°54′54″W | Category B | 7671 | Upload Photo |
| Crubenbeg Bridge Over River Truim | | | | 57°00′11″N 4°10′29″W | Category B | 7663 | Upload Photo |
| Insh, Mile House | | | | 57°06′53″N 3°55′10″W | Category C(S) | 7670 | Upload Photo |
| Newtonmore, Craigmhor Hotel | | | | 57°03′49″N 4°07′21″W | Category C(S) | 7672 | Upload Photo |

== Key ==
The scheme for classifying buildings in Scotland is:

- Category A: "buildings of national or international importance, either architectural or historic; or fine, little-altered examples of some particular period, style or building type."
- Category B: "buildings of regional or more than local importance; or major examples of some particular period, style or building type, which may have been altered."
- Category C: "buildings of local importance; lesser examples of any period, style, or building type, as originally constructed or moderately altered; and simple traditional buildings which group well with other listed buildings."

In March 2016 there were 47,288 listed buildings in Scotland. Of these, 8% were Category A, and 50% were Category B, with the remaining 42% being Category C.

== See also ==
- List of listed buildings in Highland
