= List of listed buildings in Lochcarron, Highland =

This is a list of listed buildings in the parish of Lochcarron in Highland, Scotland.

== List ==
Name	Location	Date Listed	Grid Ref. (Note: Sometimes known as OSGB36, the grid reference (where provided) is based on the British national grid reference system used by the Ordnance Survey. • "Guide to National Grid". Ordnance Survey. • "Get-a-map". Ordnance Survey.)	Geo-coordinates	Notes	LB Number (Note: Historic Environment Scotland assign a unique alphanumeric identifier to each designated site in Scotland, for listed buildings this always begins with "LB", for example "LB12345".)	Image
Lochcarron Old Parish Church				57°24′54″N 5°28′24″W	Category B	7258	Upload another image
Balnacra, Old School And Schoolhouse				57°27′36″N 5°22′12″W	Category C(S)	51036	Upload Photo
Lochcarron Free Church				57°23′39″N 5°30′21″W	Category B	7259	Upload Photo
Attadale House				57°23′40″N 5°27′11″W	Category C(S)	7254	Upload Photo
Coulags Bridge Over Fionn-Ahainn River				57°27′01″N 5°24′23″W	Category C(S)	7255	Upload Photo
Tornapress Bridge Over The Allt Mor				57°25′02″N 5°36′08″W	Category C(S)	7266	Upload Photo
Lochcarron, Main Street, Bank House (Halifax Royal Bank Of Scotland) Including Former Stables, Boundary Walls, Gatepiers And Railings				57°23′54″N 5°30′00″W	Category B	49299	Upload Photo
New Kelso House				57°25′45″N 5°26′00″W	Category A	7262	Upload Photo
Tullich Farm Square				57°25′34″N 5°28′08″W	Category B	7267	Upload Photo
Drochaid Mhor Bridge Over River Kishorn				57°25′10″N 5°36′31″W	Category C(S)	7257	Upload Photo
New Kelso Farm Square				57°25′43″N 5°26′02″W	Category B	7263	Upload Photo
Lochcarron Hotel				57°24′13″N 5°28′52″W	Category C(S)	7260	Upload Photo
Lochcarron Old Police Station				57°24′07″N 5°29′08″W	Category C(S)	7261	Upload Photo
New Kelso Driveway Pair Estate Cottages				57°25′38″N 5°26′15″W	Category C(S)	7264	Upload Photo
Tornapress				57°25′09″N 5°36′10″W	Category C(S)	7265	Upload Photo
Achnashellach Lodge				57°28′47″N 5°20′03″W	Category C(S)	7268	Upload Photo
Courthill Episcopal Chapel				57°24′16″N 5°36′40″W	Category C(S)	7256	Upload Photo

== Key ==
The scheme for classifying buildings in Scotland is:

- Category A: "buildings of national or international importance, either architectural or historic; or fine, little-altered examples of some particular period, style or building type."
- Category B: "buildings of regional or more than local importance; or major examples of some particular period, style or building type, which may have been altered."
- Category C: "buildings of local importance; lesser examples of any period, style, or building type, as originally constructed or moderately altered; and simple traditional buildings which group well with other listed buildings."

In March 2016 there were 47,288 listed buildings in Scotland. Of these, 8% were Category A, and 50% were Category B, with the remaining 42% being Category C.

== See also ==
- List of listed buildings in Highland
