= List of listed buildings in Rosskeen =

This is a list of listed buildings in the parish of Rosskeen in Highland, Scotland.

== List ==
Name	Location	Date Listed	Grid Ref. (Note: Sometimes known as OSGB36, the grid reference (where provided) is based on the British national grid reference system used by the Ordnance Survey. • "Guide to National Grid". Ordnance Survey. • "Get-a-map". Ordnance Survey.)	Geo-coordinates	Notes	LB Number (Note: Historic Environment Scotland assign a unique alphanumeric identifier to each designated site in Scotland, for listed buildings this always begins with "LB", for example "LB12345".)	Image
Ardross Glensax (Former Ardross School And Schoolhouse)				57°44′02″N 4°18′13″W	Category C(S)	15034	Upload Photo
Dalmore House Including Ancillary Buildings And Gatepiers	Alness			57°41′32″N 4°15′19″W	Category B	45913	Upload another image
Ardross Castle, East Lodge				57°43′45″N 4°16′59″W	Category C(S)	15032	Upload Photo
Dal-Neigh Bridge Over River Averon Or Alness River On A836				57°42′49″N 4°16′57″W	Category B	15037	Upload another image See more images
Invergordon Mains				57°41′47″N 4°10′30″W	Category B	15039	Upload Photo
Stittenham				57°44′17″N 4°16′07″W	Category C(S)	15043	Upload Photo
Alness, Averonbrae, 1 High Street	Alness			57°41′47″N 4°15′28″W	Category B	15028	Upload Photo
Alness, 17 High Street	Alness			57°41′47″N 4°15′25″W	Category C(S)	15030	Upload Photo
Ardross Castle, Terraces And Gate Piers				57°44′14″N 4°19′31″W	Category A	15031	Upload another image See more images
Belleport Pier				57°41′25″N 4°13′38″W	Category B	15036	Upload another image See more images
Old Rosskeen Parish Church And Burial Ground				57°41′38″N 4°12′07″W	Category A	15040	Upload another image See more images
Alness, 5, 7 High Street	Alness			57°41′47″N 4°15′27″W	Category C(S)	15029	Upload Photo
Ardross Church				57°44′16″N 4°19′35″W	Category C(S)	15033	Upload another image
Rosskeen Free Church Of Scotland (By Achnagarron)				57°42′09″N 4°12′41″W	Category B	15042	Upload another image See more images
Easter Ardross Farmhouse				57°43′59″N 4°17′17″W	Category C(S)	15038	Upload Photo
Alness, Invergordon Road Masonic Hall	Alness			57°41′42″N 4°14′51″W	Category B	15027	Upload another image
Belleport House				57°41′27″N 4°13′40″W	Category C(S)	15035	Upload Photo
Rosebank Farmhouse				57°43′03″N 4°13′23″W	Category C(S)	15041	Upload Photo
Kincraig House Hotel				57°42′33″N 4°11′50″W	Category C(S)	15044	Upload another image

== Key ==
The scheme for classifying buildings in Scotland is:

- Category A: "buildings of national or international importance, either architectural or historic; or fine, little-altered examples of some particular period, style or building type."
- Category B: "buildings of regional or more than local importance; or major examples of some particular period, style or building type, which may have been altered."
- Category C: "buildings of local importance; lesser examples of any period, style, or building type, as originally constructed or moderately altered; and simple traditional buildings which group well with other listed buildings."

In March 2016 there were 47,288 listed buildings in Scotland. Of these, 8% were Category A, and 50% were Category B, with the remaining 42% being Category C.

== See also ==
- List of listed buildings in Highland
