= List of listed buildings in Urquhart and Glenmoriston =

This is a list of listed buildings in the parish of Urquhart and Glenmoriston in Highland, Scotland.

== List ==
Name	Location	Date listed	Geo-coordinates	Notes	Category	LB number	Image
Glenmoriston, Ceannacroc Bridge (Old) Over River Moriston			57°09′09″N 4°55′55″W		B	14994	Upload another image See more images
Glenurquhart, Corrimony Burial Ground			57°19′56″N 4°41′54″W		C(S)	14998	Upload Photo
Drumnadrochit, Temple House East And Temple House West, Former Temple Cottages			57°20′13″N 4°26′44″W		C(S)	15013	Upload Photo
Glenurquhart, Mill Of Tore And Mill Cottage			57°19′51″N 4°34′22″W		B	15014	Upload Photo
Glenurquhart, St Ninians Episcopal Church			57°20′14″N 4°36′29″W		C(S)	15018	Upload another image See more images
Invermoriston, Burial Ground And 2 Pairs Of Gate Piers			57°12′48″N 4°36′52″W		B	15023	Upload another image
Loch Ashlaich, Shooting Box And Bothy			57°16′30″N 4°38′24″W		C(S)	19486	Upload Photo
Glenmoriston, Torgoyle Bridge Over River Moriston			57°10′33″N 4°47′55″W		A	14996	Upload another image See more images
Drumnadrochit, Old Kilmore Burial Ground And Watch-House			57°19′56″N 4°28′03″W		C(S)	15012	Upload another image
Glenurquhart, Shewglie			57°19′50″N 4°37′52″W		B	15015	Upload Photo
Glenurquhart, Corrimony Grange Barn			57°20′08″N 4°41′53″W		A	14997	Upload Photo
Drumnadrochit, Kilmore Parish Church Of Scotland And Burial Ground			57°19′51″N 4°28′41″W		B	15011	Upload another image See more images
Invermoriston, "Barracks" And Servants' Tunnel To Former Mansion			57°12′42″N 4°36′27″W		B	15017	Upload Photo
Invermoriston, Church Of Scotland			57°12′56″N 4°37′12″W		B	15022	Upload Photo
Drumnadrochit, Allanmore			57°20′09″N 4°29′56″W		C(S)	14993	Upload Photo
Drumnadrochit, Benleva (Former Church Of Scotland Manse)			57°19′56″N 4°28′16″W		B	15004	Upload another image
By Invermoriston, Alltsaigh House			57°14′12″N 4°33′30″W		B	15016	Upload Photo
Lochletter Farm, Garden Pavilion			57°19′54″N 4°35′37″W		B	49692	Upload Photo
Glenmoriston, Achlain House			57°10′15″N 4°50′52″W		C(S)	14995	Upload Photo
Drumnadrochit, Dhivach Lodge			57°18′41″N 4°30′11″W		B	15007	Upload another image
Drumnadrochit, Drumnadrochit Hotel (Loch Ness Centre)			57°20′15″N 4°28′40″W		B	15008	Upload another image
Drumnadrochit, Greenlea			57°20′12″N 4°28′47″W		B	15010	Upload another image
Invermoriston, Road Bridge Over River Moriston			57°12′44″N 4°37′05″W		B	15025	Upload another image See more images
Glenurquhart, Free Church			57°20′20″N 4°30′34″W		C(S)	15001	Upload another image
Glenurquhart, Lockletter Bridge Over River Enrick			57°20′08″N 4°35′14″W		B	15003	Upload another image
Drumnadrochit, Bridge Over River Enrick			57°20′14″N 4°28′49″W		C(S)	15005	Upload another image See more images
Drumnadrochit, Glenurquhart Secondary School And Schoolhouse			57°19′57″N 4°28′38″W		B	15009	Upload another image
Invermoriston, Gazebo. (In Policies Of Invermoriston House)			57°12′42″N 4°36′59″W		B	15020	Upload another image See more images
Urquhart Castle			57°19′29″N 4°26′29″W		A	15026	Upload another image See more images
Glenurquhart, Old Corrimony			57°20′04″N 4°41′54″W		B	15000	Upload Photo
Glenurquhart, Kilmartin Hall And Garden Walls			57°20′20″N 4°36′03″W		B	15002	Upload Photo
Drumnadrochit, Cnocan Burra Burial Ground			57°19′48″N 4°29′04″W		C(S)	15006	Upload Photo
Invermoriston, Cottage And Pottery Studio (By Old Bridge) (Old Smithy Cottage)			57°12′47″N 4°37′06″W		C(S)	15019	Upload Photo
Glenurquhart, Corrimony Bridge Over River Enrick			57°20′04″N 4°41′48″W		B	14999	Upload another image
Invermoriston, Home Farm And Former Barn To Rear			57°12′45″N 4°35′58″W		A	15021	Upload Photo
Invermoriston, Old Bridge Over River Moriston			57°12′45″N 4°37′07″W		B	15024	Upload another image See more images

== Key ==
The scheme for classifying buildings in Scotland is:

- Category A: "buildings of national or international importance, either architectural or historic; or fine, little-altered examples of some particular period, style or building type."
- Category B: "buildings of regional or more than local importance; or major examples of some particular period, style or building type, which may have been altered."
- Category C: "buildings of local importance; lesser examples of any period, style, or building type, as originally constructed or moderately altered; and simple traditional buildings which group well with other listed buildings."

In March 2016 there were 47,288 listed buildings in Scotland. Of these, 8% were Category A, and 50% were Category B, with the remaining 42% being Category C.

== See also ==
- List of listed buildings in Highland
