= List of listed buildings in Kintail, Highland =

This is a list of listed buildings in the parish of Kintail in Highland, Scotland.

== List ==
Name	Location	Date Listed	Grid Ref. (Note: Sometimes known as OSGB36, the grid reference (where provided) is based on the British national grid reference system used by the Ordnance Survey. • "Guide to National Grid". Ordnance Survey. • "Get-a-map". Ordnance Survey.)	Geo-coordinates	Notes	LB Number (Note: Historic Environment Scotland assign a unique alphanumeric identifier to each designated site in Scotland, for listed buildings this always begins with "LB", for example "LB12345".)	Image
Kintail Parish Church (Church Of Scotland)				57°14′05″N 5°25′56″W	Category B	7205	Upload another image
Tigh-Geal (Former Kintail Manse) And Steading				57°14′01″N 5°24′58″W	Category B	7207	Upload Photo
Eilean Donan Castle				57°16′26″N 5°30′58″W	Category A	7209	Upload another image See more images
Dornie St Duthac's Roman Catholic Church And Presbytery				57°16′56″N 5°30′42″W	Category B	7208	Upload Photo
Kintail Old Parish Church, Graveyard And Macrae War Memorial				57°14′02″N 5°24′16″W	Category B	7210	Upload another image
Lienassie House And Barn				57°14′27″N 5°22′42″W	Category B	7206	Upload another image

== Key ==
The scheme for classifying buildings in Scotland is:

- Category A: "buildings of national or international importance, either architectural or historic; or fine, little-altered examples of some particular period, style or building type."
- Category B: "buildings of regional or more than local importance; or major examples of some particular period, style or building type, which may have been altered."
- Category C: "buildings of local importance; lesser examples of any period, style, or building type, as originally constructed or moderately altered; and simple traditional buildings which group well with other listed buildings."

In March 2016 there were 47,288 listed buildings in Scotland. Of these, 8% were Category A, and 50% were Category B, with the remaining 42% being Category C.

== See also ==
- List of listed buildings in Highland
