= List of listed buildings in Tarbat, Highland =

This is a list of listed buildings in the parish of Tarbat in Highland, Scotland.

== List ==
Name	Location	Date Listed	Grid Ref. (Note: Sometimes known as OSGB36, the grid reference (where provided) is based on the British national grid reference system used by the Ordnance Survey. • "Guide to National Grid". Ordnance Survey. • "Get-a-map". Ordnance Survey.)	Geo-coordinates	Notes	LB Number (Note: Historic Environment Scotland assign a unique alphanumeric identifier to each designated site in Scotland, for listed buildings this always begins with "LB", for example "LB12345".)	Image
Portmahomack Ice House With Associated Store And Cottage				57°50′02″N 3°49′44″W	Category B	14096	Upload Photo
Geanies House Garden Walls And Gate Piers				57°47′22″N 3°51′44″W	Category B	14105	Upload Photo
Geanies House Summer House				57°47′14″N 3°51′36″W	Category B	14106	Upload Photo
Portmahomack Free Church				57°49′59″N 3°49′54″W	Category C(S)	14107	Upload another image
Portmahomack Harbour Street Southern Warehouse				57°50′17″N 3°49′42″W	Category A	14091	Upload Photo
Portmahomack Old Tarbat Manse And Garden Walls				57°49′58″N 3°49′36″W	Category C(S)	14097	Upload Photo
Tarbat Ness Lighthouse, Keepers' Cottages And Enclosing Wall				57°51′54″N 3°46′37″W	Category A	14100	Upload another image
Portmahomack Well Street Caberfeidh				57°50′11″N 3°49′38″W	Category B	14095	Upload Photo
Portmahomack Tarbat Old Church And Burial Ground				57°49′58″N 3°49′44″W	Category A	14098	Upload another image
Ballone Castle				57°49′49″N 3°48′20″W	Category A	14104	Upload another image
Portmahomack Harbour Street Northern Warehouse				57°50′18″N 3°49′42″W	Category B	14109	Upload Photo
Portmahomack Harbour Street Tarbat Lodge				57°50′17″N 3°49′41″W	Category C(S)	14094	Upload Photo
Tarrel				57°48′15″N 3°51′03″W	Category B	14101	Upload another image
Portmahomack Free Church Of Scotland Manse				57°49′56″N 3°49′58″W	Category C(S)	14108	Upload Photo
Portmahomack Harbour Street Harbour				57°50′16″N 3°49′45″W	Category B	14092	Upload Photo
Portmahomack Harbour Street Fountain				57°50′15″N 3°49′41″W	Category B	14093	Upload another image
Rockfield Castle (Formerly Little Tarrel Castle)				57°48′50″N 3°50′07″W	Category B	14099	Upload another image
Tarrel Farm (Formerly Meikle Tarrel), Farmworkers Cottages				57°48′22″N 3°51′06″W	Category B	46522	Upload Photo

== Key ==
The scheme for classifying buildings in Scotland is:

- Category A: "buildings of national or international importance, either architectural or historic; or fine, little-altered examples of some particular period, style or building type."
- Category B: "buildings of regional or more than local importance; or major examples of some particular period, style or building type, which may have been altered."
- Category C: "buildings of local importance; lesser examples of any period, style, or building type, as originally constructed or moderately altered; and simple traditional buildings which group well with other listed buildings."

In March 2016 there were 47,288 listed buildings in Scotland. Of these, 8% were Category A, and 50% were Category B, with the remaining 42% being Category C.

== See also ==
- List of listed buildings in Highland
