= List of listed buildings in Cawdor, Highland =

This is a list of listed buildings in the parish of Cawdor in Highland, Scotland.

== List ==
Name	Location	Date Listed	Grid Ref. (Note: Sometimes known as OSGB36, the grid reference (where provided) is based on the British national grid reference system used by the Ordnance Survey. • "Guide to National Grid". Ordnance Survey. • "Get-a-map". Ordnance Survey.)	Geo-coordinates	Notes	LB Number (Note: Historic Environment Scotland assign a unique alphanumeric identifier to each designated site in Scotland, for listed buildings this always begins with "LB", for example "LB12345".)	Image
Brackla House And Walled Garden				57°32′15″N 3°54′20″W	Category B	1726	Upload Photo
Clunas				57°29′41″N 3°52′01″W	Category B	1737	Upload Photo
Cawdor Village Old Change House				57°31′39″N 3°55′36″W	Category C(S)	1752	Upload Photo
Cawdor Village West End West End Cottage (Immediately West Of Ivy Cottage)				57°31′23″N 3°56′09″W	Category C(S)	1754	Upload Photo
Cawdor Village West End Ivy Cottage				57°31′24″N 3°56′08″W	Category C(S)	1755	Upload Photo
Cawdor Castle Home Farm Granary				57°31′27″N 3°55′21″W	Category B	1732	Upload Photo
Meikle Urchany				57°31′40″N 3°52′08″W	Category B	1738	Upload Photo
Newton Of Budgate				57°31′27″N 3°57′30″W	Category B	1739	Upload another image
Cawdor Village County Salon (Former Post Office) And Former Post Office House				57°31′32″N 3°55′40″W	Category C(S)	1767	Upload Photo
Cawdor Castle, East Lodge				57°31′20″N 3°55′15″W	Category C(S)	1731	Upload another image
Cawdor Village Bridge House				57°31′33″N 3°55′39″W	Category C(S)	1733	Upload Photo
Cawdor Village Lavender Cottage				57°31′31″N 3°55′50″W	Category B	1736	Upload Photo
Bareven Bridge Over The Allt Dearg, Wester Bareven				57°29′57″N 3°57′26″W	Category C(S)	1724	Upload another image
Cawdor Castle Walled Garden				57°31′25″N 3°55′33″W	Category B	1729	Upload Photo
Cawdor Village Fountainsyde (L) And Hillview (R)				57°31′33″N 3°55′44″W	Category C(S)	1734	Upload Photo
Cawdor Village Old Manse Walled Garden, Steading And Gate Piers				57°31′22″N 3°56′23″W	Category B	1753	Upload Photo
Cawdor Village Off Back Street Church Hall				57°31′26″N 3°55′56″W	Category C(S)	1761	Upload Photo
Cawdor Village, Back Street The Rockery				57°31′29″N 3°55′48″W	Category C(S)	1764	Upload Photo
Auchindoune House				57°30′26″N 3°56′26″W	Category B	1723	Upload Photo
Cawdor Castle				57°31′27″N 3°55′36″W	Category A	1728	Upload another image See more images
Cawdor Village West End Cottage (Opposite South Entrance To Parish Church)				57°31′26″N 3°55′59″W	Category C(S)	1759	Upload Photo
Cawdor Village Cawdor Parish Church And Burial Ground				57°31′29″N 3°55′57″W	Category A	1760	Upload another image See more images
Cawdor Village Back Street West End House, Post Office And Former Stables				57°31′28″N 3°55′55″W	Category C(S)	1763	Upload Photo
Cawdor Village Back Street The Schoolhouse				57°31′29″N 3°55′44″W	Category C(S)	1765	Upload Photo
Cawdor Village Back Street South House				57°31′29″N 3°55′44″W	Category C(S)	1766	Upload Photo
Bareven Church Kirkton Of Bareven				57°30′02″N 3°56′34″W	Category B	1725	Upload Photo
Budgate House				57°31′14″N 3°56′42″W	Category A	1727	Upload another image
Cawdor Castle Gate Lodge And Entrance				57°31′31″N 3°55′37″W	Category B	1730	Upload Photo
Cawdor Village West End Rowan Cottage (L) And Mrs Cameron's Cottage (R)				57°31′24″N 3°56′06″W	Category C(S)	1756	Upload Photo
Cawdor Village West End Memorial Cottage				57°31′25″N 3°56′04″W	Category C(S)	1757	Upload Photo
Cawdor Village Gardener's Cottage				57°31′33″N 3°55′48″W	Category C(S)	1735	Upload Photo
Cawdor Village Meadowbank				57°31′24″N 3°56′02″W	Category C(S)	1758	Upload Photo
Cawdor Village Off Back Street The Mound				57°31′26″N 3°55′54″W	Category C(S)	1762	Upload Photo

== Key ==
The scheme for classifying buildings in Scotland is:

- Category A: "buildings of national or international importance, either architectural or historic; or fine, little-altered examples of some particular period, style or building type."
- Category B: "buildings of regional or more than local importance; or major examples of some particular period, style or building type, which may have been altered."
- Category C: "buildings of local importance; lesser examples of any period, style, or building type, as originally constructed or moderately altered; and simple traditional buildings which group well with other listed buildings."

In March 2016 there were 47,288 listed buildings in Scotland. Of these, 8% were Category A, and 50% were Category B, with the remaining 42% being Category C.

== See also ==
- List of listed buildings in Highland
