= List of Category A listed buildings in Highland =

Highland shown within Scotland

This is a list of Category A listed buildings in the Highland council area of northern Scotland.

In Scotland, the term listed building refers to a building or other structure officially designated as being of "special architectural or historic interest". Category A structures are those considered to be "buildings of national or international importance, either architectural or historic, or fine little-altered examples of some particular period, style or building type." Listing was begun by a provision in the Town and Country Planning (Scotland) Act 1947, and the current legislative basis for listing is the Planning (Listed Buildings and Conservation Areas) (Scotland) Act 1997. The authority for listing rests with Historic Scotland, an executive agency of the Scottish Government, which inherited this role from the Scottish Development Department in 1991. Once listed, severe restrictions are imposed on the modifications allowed to a building's structure or its fittings. Listed building consent must be obtained from local authorities prior to any alteration to such a structure. There are approximately 47,400 listed buildings in Scotland, of which around 8% (some 3,800) are Category A.

The council area of Highland is the largest in Scotland, covering 30,659 square kilometres (11,838 sq mi), and it has a population of around 220,500. There are 185 Category A listed buildings in the area.

== Listed buildings ==
Name	Location	Date listed	Geo-coordinates	Notes	LB number	Image
Sluggan Bridge over River Dulnain	Sluggan, Carrbridge		57°16′29″N 3°52′33″W		240	Upload another image See more images
Muckrach Castle	Dulnain Bridge		57°18′17″N 3°41′05″W		249	Upload another image See more images
Croft House	Coylumbridge, Rothiemurchus		57°09′42″N 3°48′56″W		251	Upload another image
Aviemore railway station	Aviemore		57°11′19″N 3°49′45″W		257	Upload another image See more images
Broomhill Bridge over River Spey	Broomhill, Nethy Bridge		57°16′51″N 3°39′56″W		260	Upload another image See more images
Shin Railway Viaduct over Kyle of Sutherland	Kyle of Sutherland		57°55′27″N 4°24′04″W		279	Upload another image See more images
Borrodale Viaduct over Borrodale Burn	Arisaig		56°54′12″N 5°46′59″W		302	Upload another image See more images
Castle Tioram	Loch Moidart, Lochaber		56°47′04″N 5°49′45″W		305	Upload another image See more images
St Finnan's Chapel and Burial Ground	Eilean Fhianain, Loch Shiel		56°45′06″N 5°40′43″W		306	Upload another image
Glenfinnan Monument	Glenfinnan		56°52′09″N 5°26′13″W		308	Upload another image See more images
Glenfinnan Railway Viaduct over River Finnan	Glenfinnan		56°52′35″N 5°25′54″W		310	Upload another image See more images
Kinlochmoidart House	Kinlochmoidart		56°47′13″N 5°44′26″W		317	Upload another image See more images
Old Spey Bridge over River Spey	Speybridge, Grantown-on-Spey		57°19′03″N 3°35′45″W		335	Upload another image See more images
Castle Grant	Grantown-on-Spey		57°21′07″N 3°35′41″W		348	Upload another image See more images
Castle Grant East Lodge, railway bridge over A939 road, and entrance arch to drive	Grantown-on-Spey		57°21′07″N 3°36′33″W		349	Upload another image See more images
The Dairy, Rosehaugh Estate	Avoch		57°34′18″N 4°12′21″W		374	Upload another image
Glendale Mill and Kiln (now museum)	Glendale, Skye		57°26′59″N 6°43′21″W		467	Upload another image See more images
Cape Wrath Lighthouse	Cape Wrath		58°37′31″N 4°59′57″W		488	Upload another image See more images
Dunvegan Parish Church	Dunvegan, Skye		57°26′18″N 6°34′59″W		498	Upload another image See more images
Dunvegan Castle	Dunvegan, Skye		57°26′55″N 6°35′24″W		501	Upload another image See more images
Dunvegan Castle, The Laundry	Dunvegan, Skye		57°26′52″N 6°35′28″W		503	Upload another image See more images
Balnakeil House	Balnakeil, Durness		58°34′33″N 4°46′02″W		517	Upload another image See more images
Ardnamurchan Lighthouse	Ardnamurchan Point		56°43′38″N 6°13′34″W		521	Upload another image See more images
Glenborrodale Castle	Glenborrodale		56°40′42″N 5°54′34″W		524	Upload another image See more images
Mingary Castle	Kilchoan		56°41′34″N 6°04′49″W		527	Upload another image See more images
Aldourie Castle	Dores, Loch Ness		57°24′13″N 4°19′47″W		535	Upload another image See more images
Aultmore House	Nethy Bridge		57°16′30″N 3°38′10″W		549	Upload Photo
Ardclach Bell Tower	Ardclach, Ferness		57°29′10″N 3°44′48″W		551	Upload another image See more images
Dulsie Bridge over River Findhorn	Dulsie, Ferness		57°27′02″N 3°46′53″W		557	Upload another image See more images
Glenferness House	Ferness		57°27′48″N 3°46′24″W		560	Upload Photo
Logie Bridge over River Findhorn	Ferness		57°29′39″N 3°44′15″W		564	Upload another image See more images
Skibo Castle	Dornoch		57°52′23″N 4°07′56″W		597	Upload another image See more images
Embo House	Embo, Dornoch		57°54′13″N 4°00′41″W		608	Upload another image
Boath House	Auldearn		57°34′46″N 3°48′30″W		1649	Upload another image See more images
Brightmony House	Auldearn		57°33′40″N 3°47′27″W		1657	Upload Photo
Culloden Moor, Memorial Cairn	Culloden		57°28′39″N 4°06′00″W		1699	Upload another image See more images
Nairn Viaduct over River Nairn, otherwise known as Culloden Moor Viaduct	Clava, Culloden		57°28′41″N 4°03′46″W		1709	Upload another image See more images
Dalcross Castle	Dalcross, Croy		57°30′30″N 4°02′25″W		1713	Upload another image See more images
Fort George	Ardersier, Inverness		57°34′59″N 4°04′27″W		1721	Upload another image See more images
Budgate House	Cawdor		57°31′14″N 3°56′42″W		1727	Upload another image
Cawdor Castle	Cawdor		57°31′27″N 3°55′36″W		1728	Upload another image See more images
Cawdor Parish Church	Cawdor		57°31′29″N 3°55′57″W		1760	Upload another image See more images
Coul House	Contin		57°34′17″N 4°34′21″W		1769	Upload another image See more images
Contin Bridge over the Black Water	Contin		57°34′25″N 4°35′12″W		1789	Upload another image
Canisbay Parish Church (St Drostan's)	Canisbay		58°38′19″N 3°07′57″W		1795	Upload another image See more images
Castle of Mey	Mey		58°38′49″N 3°13′28″W		1797	Upload another image See more images
Freswick House	Freswick		58°35′16″N 3°04′18″W		1799	Upload another image See more images
Holme Rose	Croy		57°30′43″N 3°59′38″W		1812	Upload another image
Cromarty House	Cromarty		57°40′36″N 4°01′32″W		1818	Upload another image
Cromarty House, Stables	Cromarty		57°40′31″N 4°01′27″W		1820	Upload another image See more images
Kilravock Castle	Croy		57°31′08″N 3°58′54″W		1841	Upload another image See more images
White Bridge over River Nairn	Clephanton		57°31′37″N 3°57′54″W		1843	Upload another image See more images
Fort Augustus Abbey	Fort Augustus		57°08′41″N 4°40′36″W		1861	Upload another image See more images
Fort Augustus Abbey Church	Fort Augustus		57°08′41″N 4°40′36″W		1862	Upload Photo
Oich Old Bridge over River Oich	Aberchalder		57°05′36″N 4°44′43″W		1872	Upload another image See more images
Old Bridge over River Foyers, Whitebridge	Whitebridge		57°12′15″N 4°30′10″W		1874	Upload another image See more images
Dunnet Parish Church (Church Of Scotland)	Dunnet		58°37′17″N 3°20′42″W		1888	Upload another image See more images
Edderton Old Parish Church and Burial Ground	Edderton		57°49′45″N 4°09′30″W		4572	Upload another image See more images
Keppoch Barn	Roybridge		56°53′14″N 4°50′31″W		6837	Upload Photo
Commando Memorial	Spean Bridge		56°53′53″N 4°56′39″W		6842	Upload another image See more images
Mucomir Bridge over River Lochy	Gairlochy, Caledonian Canal		56°54′36″N 4°59′06″W		6868	Upload Photo
Garvamore Barracks	Garvamore, Laggan		57°00′59″N 4°25′34″W		6899	Upload another image
Garva Bridge over River Spey (St George's Bridge)	Garvamore, Laggan		57°01′12″N 4°26′12″W		6900	Upload another image See more images
Ardverikie House	Loch Laggan		56°57′18″N 4°27′18″W		6910	Upload another image See more images
Ardverikie Gate Lodge, gate piers and bridge over River Pattack	Ardverikie House, Loch Laggan		56°58′31″N 4°24′17″W		6911	Upload another image See more images
Cluny Castle	Balgowan, Laggan		57°01′11″N 4°13′57″W		6914	Upload another image See more images
Plockton Church and Graveyard	Plockton, Innes Street		57°20′14″N 5°39′09″W		6927	Upload another image See more images
12 Lower Ardelve	Ardelve		57°16′52″N 5°31′43″W		6999	Upload another image
Mound Bridge and Keeper's Cottage	The Mound, Loch Fleet		57°57′23″N 4°04′15″W		7022	Upload another image See more images
St Andrew's Parish Church	Golspie, Main Street		57°58′34″N 3°58′00″W		7036	Upload another image See more images
Dunrobin Castle	Golspie		57°58′54″N 3°56′44″W		7044	Upload another image See more images
Dunrobin Castle, Garden Pavilion (Museum) and Walled Garden	Golspie		57°58′53″N 3°56′36″W		7045	Upload another image See more images
Caledonian Canal, Glen Loy Aqueduct over the River Loy	Strone, Muirshearlich		56°53′25″N 5°02′23″W		7085	Upload another image See more images
Caledonian Canal sluice by Carn Phail	Strone, Muirshearlich		56°53′08″N 5°02′24″W		7089	Upload another image See more images
Caledonian Canal, Torcastle Aqueduct over the Allt Sheangain	Torcastle, Muirshearlich		56°51′58″N 5°03′59″W		7090	Upload another image See more images
Callert House	Loch Leven		56°41′46″N 5°07′07″W		7091	Upload another image See more images
Fasnakyle Power Station	Cannich		57°19′34″N 4°47′39″W		7118	Upload another image See more images
Glen Affric Lodge	Glen Affric		57°15′39″N 5°00′45″W		7121	Upload another image See more images
Beauly Priory	Beauly		57°29′05″N 4°27′28″W		7129	Upload another image See more images
Loth Parish Church	Lothmore, Helmsdale		58°04′46″N 3°44′48″W		7149	Upload another image See more images
Bighouse, Garden Pavilion and Walled Garden	Melvich		58°33′27″N 3°54′22″W		7160	Upload Photo
Croick Parish Church and Burial Ground	Croick, Strathcarron, Bonar Bridge		57°53′09″N 4°36′16″W		7181	Upload another image See more images
Helmsdale Bridge over River Helmsdale	Helmsdale		58°07′00″N 3°39′18″W		7193	Upload another image See more images
Eilean Donan Castle	Dornie, Loch Duich		57°16′26″N 5°30′58″W		7209	Upload another image See more images
Glenelg War Memorial	Glenelg		57°12′40″N 5°37′43″W		7236	Upload another image See more images
40 Bornesketaig, Beaton's Cottage	Bornesketaig, Skye		57°39′00″N 6°23′47″W		7240	Upload another image See more images
Bernera Barracks	Glenelg		57°12′58″N 5°37′12″W		7252	Upload another image See more images
New Kelso House	Strathcarron		57°25′45″N 5°26′00″W		7262	Upload Photo
Ruthven Barracks	Ruthven, Kingussie		57°04′20″N 4°02′21″W		7659	Upload another image See more images
Auchindrean Bridge, over River Broom	Auchindrean		57°46′43″N 5°02′11″W		7754	Upload another image See more images
Former Ullapool Parish Church and Burial Ground	Ullapool, West Argyle Street		57°53′45″N 5°09′44″W		7764	Upload another image See more images
Fearn Abbey	Fearn Abbey		57°46′13″N 3°57′22″W		7780	Upload another image See more images
Old Wardlaw Church, with Lovat Burial Aisle and Burial Ground	Kirkhill		57°28′42″N 4°25′14″W		7815	Upload another image See more images
Castle Leod	Strathpeffer		57°35′54″N 4°32′06″W		7826	Upload another image See more images
Tarbat House	Milton		57°44′07″N 4°04′02″W		7848	Upload another image See more images
Kilmuir Easter Parish Church and Burial Ground	Kilmuir Easter		57°43′53″N 4°05′17″W		7876	Upload another image See more images
Udrigle House	Achgarve		57°52′56″N 5°33′03″W		7902	Upload another image See more images
Wyvis Lodge	Loch Glass, Evanton		57°43′37″N 4°32′45″W		7906	Upload another image See more images
Flowerdale House (including Westerdale)	Charlestown, Wester Ross		57°42′53″N 5°40′17″W		7910	Upload another image See more images
Foulis Castle	Evanton		57°38′41″N 4°21′54″W		7911	Upload another image See more images
Foulis Point Granary	Evanton		57°38′25″N 4°20′51″W		7914	Upload another image See more images
The Corr	Latheron		58°18′10″N 3°21′45″W		7935	Upload another image
Dunbeath Castle	Dunbeath		58°14′06″N 3°26′08″W		7936	Upload another image See more images
Forse House Dovecote	Latheron		58°17′59″N 3°20′49″W		7949	Upload Photo
Laidhay Croft Museum	Dunbeath		58°15′21″N 3°24′33″W		7951	Upload another image See more images
Kilcoy Castle	Muir of Ord		57°31′44″N 4°22′44″W		8007	Upload another image See more images
Old Allangrange House	Munlochy		57°31′54″N 4°17′57″W		8013	Upload another image See more images
Dochfour House	Dochgarroch		57°25′18″N 4°19′31″W		8028	Upload another image See more images
Culloden House	Culloden		57°29′26″N 4°08′07″W		8039	Upload another image See more images
Inshes House, tower house in grounds	Inshes, Inverness		57°27′53″N 4°10′38″W		8050	Upload Photo
Leys Castle	Milton of Leys		57°26′24″N 4°12′02″W		8053	Upload Photo
Beaufort Castle	Beauly		57°27′10″N 4°29′25″W		8068	Upload another image See more images
Lovat Bridge over River Beauly	Beauly		57°28′14″N 4°28′33″W		8083	Upload another image See more images
Culloden House, Stables and Yard Wall	Culloden		57°29′18″N 4°08′09″W		10954	Upload another image
Raasay House	Raasay		57°21′13″N 6°04′44″W		13932	Upload another image See more images
Ardtornish Tower, Mansion and Clock Tower	Lochaline		56°33′48″N 5°44′23″W		13951	Upload another image See more images
Armadale Castle Stables	Armadale, Skye		57°04′11″N 5°53′49″W		14004	Upload another image See more images
Fairburn Tower	Marybank		57°32′07″N 4°33′29″W		14030	Upload another image See more images
Nigg Parish Church (Church of Scotland) and Graveyard	Nigg		57°43′09″N 4°00′32″W		14044	Upload another image See more images
Ackergill Tower	Wick		58°28′32″N 3°06′41″W		14072	Upload another image See more images
Keiss Harbour and Warehouse	Keiss		58°31′52″N 3°06′58″W		14085	Upload another image See more images
Noss Head Lighthouse	Wick		58°28′44″N 3°03′03″W		14087	Upload another image See more images
Sibster Farm Steading	Sibster, Wick		58°27′36″N 3°09′43″W		14088	Upload Photo
Southern Warehouse (Telford House)	Portmahomack, Harbour Street		57°50′17″N 3°49′42″W		14091	Upload another image
Tarbat Ness Lighthouse	Portmahomack		57°51′54″N 3°46′36″W		14100	Upload another image See more images
Ballone Castle	Portmahomack		57°49′49″N 3°48′20″W		14104	Upload another image See more images
Kinloch Castle	Isle of Rùm		57°00′49″N 6°16′55″W		14125	Upload another image See more images
Aultnaslanach Viaduct (or Moy Viaduct) over Allt na Slanaich	Moy		57°23′16″N 4°03′52″W		14887	Upload another image See more images
Kinkell Castle	Conon Bridge		57°33′21″N 4°25′07″W		14906	Upload another image See more images
Castle Craig (or Castlecraig)	Culbokie, Black Isle		57°38′36″N 4°17′37″W		14938	Upload another image See more images
Newhall House	Balblair, Black Isle		57°39′40″N 4°11′00″W		14942	Upload another image See more images
Poyntzfield House	Jemimaville, Black Isle		57°38′59″N 4°09′43″W		14949	Upload another image See more images
Achingale Mill	Watten, Caithness		58°27′46″N 3°18′12″W		14976	Upload another image See more images
Sandside House Kiln Barn, and single storey range of former byres, cottage and dairy, and implement shed	Reay, Caithness		58°33′45″N 3°48′10″W		14986	Upload Photo
Sandside Harbour and Fishing Store	Fresgoe, Caithness		58°34′12″N 3°47′34″W		14988	Upload another image See more images
Reay Parish Church	Reay, Caithness		58°33′33″N 3°46′36″W		14992	Upload another image See more images
Torgoyle Bridge (or Torgyle Bridge) over River Moriston	Glenmoriston		57°10′33″N 4°47′55″W		14996	Upload another image See more images
Corrimony Grange Barn	Corrimony, Glenurquhart		57°20′08″N 4°41′53″W		14997	Upload Photo
Invermoriston Home Farm	Invermoriston		57°12′45″N 4°35′58″W		15021	Upload Photo
Ardross Castle	Ardross		57°44′07″N 4°20′02″W		15031	Upload another image See more images
Old Rosskeen Parish Church and Burial Ground	Rosskeen, Invergordon		57°41′38″N 4°12′07″W		15040	Upload another image See more images
Castle Stuart	Tornagrain		57°31′15″N 4°06′10″W		17591	Upload another image See more images
Tongue Parish Church	Tongue, Sutherland		58°28′44″N 4°25′06″W		18456	Upload another image See more images
Tongue House	Tongue, Sutherland		58°29′39″N 4°25′05″W		18458	Upload Photo
The Gardener's House	Cromarty, Black Isle		57°40′43″N 4°01′33″W		23570	Upload another image See more images
Court House, Prison and Gatepiers	Cromarty, Church Street		57°40′48″N 4°01′52″W		23585	Upload another image See more images
Miller House	Cromarty, Church Street		57°40′48″N 4°01′51″W		23587	Upload Photo
Hugh Miller's Cottage	Cromarty, Church Street		57°40′48″N 4°01′51″W		23588	Upload another image See more images
East Parish Church	Cromarty, Church Street		57°40′44″N 4°01′45″W		23595	Upload another image See more images
Lighthouse and Lighthouse Keeper's House	Cromarty, George Street		57°40′59″N 4°02′11″W		23680	Upload another image See more images
Townlands Barn	Cromarty, High Street		57°40′50″N 4°02′07″W		23695	Upload another image See more images
Cromarty Harbour	Cromarty, Marine Terrace		57°40′58″N 4°02′19″W		23700	Upload another image See more images
St Clements Church	Dingwall, Church Street		57°35′50″N 4°25′44″W		24516	Upload another image See more images
Caisteal Gorach	Dingwall		57°37′00″N 4°26′18″W		24520	Upload another image See more images
Dornoch Cathedral	Dornoch, High Street		57°52′50″N 4°01′48″W		24632	Upload another image See more images
Roman Catholic Church of St. Mary and the Immaculate Conception	Fort William, Belford Road		56°49′11″N 5°06′13″W		31780	Upload another image See more images
St Andrew's Episcopal Church	Fort William, High Street		56°49′07″N 5°06′32″W		31788	Upload another image See more images
Chanonry Lighthouse	Chanonry Point		57°34′27″N 4°05′35″W		31799	Upload another image See more images
Fortrose Cathedral	Fortrose		57°34′51″N 4°07′50″W		31812	Upload another image See more images
Speyside House (former orphanage)	Grantown-on-Spey, The Square		57°19′53″N 3°36′24″W		34073	Upload another image See more images
28-34 (even nos only) Academy Street (National Bank Of Scotland)	Inverness, Academy Street		57°28′46″N 4°13′28″W		35127	Upload another image See more images
Inverness Town Steeple	Inverness, Bridge Street		57°28′39″N 4°13′32″W		35153	Upload another image See more images
Inverness Sheriff Court and Police Station (Inverness Castle)	Inverness, Castle Wynd		57°28′36″N 4°13′33″W		35166	Upload another image See more images
Old High Church	Inverness, Church Street		57°28′49″N 4°13′44″W		35179	Upload another image See more images
Dunbar's Hospital	Inverness, Church Street		57°28′48″N 4°13′40″W		35184	Upload another image See more images
9 and 11 High Street, Bank Of Scotland (former Caledonian Bank head office)	Inverness, High Street		57°28′40″N 4°13′30″W		35251	Upload another image See more images
Inverness Post Office	Inverness, High Street	22 December 1976	57°28′41″N 4°13′23″W		35259	Upload another image See more images
Inverness Town House	Inverness, High Street		57°28′38″N 4°13′30″W		35260	Upload another image See more images
St Mary's Roman Catholic Church	Inverness, Huntly Street		57°28′40″N 4°13′48″W		35272	Upload another image See more images
Balnain House	Inverness, Huntly Street		57°28′44″N 4°13′52″W		35276	Upload another image See more images
Inverness Public Library, former Farraline Park School	Inverness, Margaret Street		57°28′52″N 4°13′28″W		35311	Upload another image See more images
Cathedral Church of St Andrew (Episcopal)	Inverness, Ardross Street		57°28′28″N 4°13′45″W		35330	Upload another image See more images
Nairn Old Parish Church	Nairn, Academy Street		57°35′01″N 3°52′35″W		38400	Upload another image See more images
Marine Road, Bandstand	Nairn, Marine Road		57°35′16″N 3°52′16″W		38450	Upload another image See more images
St Duthus Collegiate Church	Tain, Castle Brae		57°48′45″N 4°03′17″W		41843	Upload another image See more images
Tolbooth and Sheriff Court	Tain, High Street		57°48′43″N 4°03′18″W		41867	Upload another image See more images
Wick Heritage Centre	Wick, Bank Row	14 September 1983	58°26′23″N 3°05′20″W		42286	Upload another image See more images
Dunbar Memorial, Wick Old Parish Church	Wick, High Street		58°26′38″N 3°05′41″W		44956	Upload Photo
Road Viaduct at Leven Road	Kinlochleven, Leven Road		56°42′48″N 4°58′15″W		46265	Upload another image
Kinlochleven Aluminium Works, Power House	Kinlochleven, Lab Road	3 August 2004	56°42′47″N 4°57′29″W		49944	Upload another image
Eden Court Theatre	Inverness, Bishop's Road		57°28′23″N 4°13′51″W		49959	Upload another image See more images

== See also ==
- Scheduled monuments in Highland
