= List of listed buildings in Duthil and Rothiemurchus =

This is a list of listed buildings in the parish of Duthil in Highland, Scotland.

== List ==
Name	Location	Date Listed	Grid Ref. (Note: Sometimes known as OSGB36, the grid reference (where provided) is based on the British national grid reference system used by the Ordnance Survey. • "Guide to National Grid". Ordnance Survey. • "Get-a-map". Ordnance Survey.)	Geo-coordinates	Notes	LB Number (Note: Historic Environment Scotland assign a unique alphanumeric identifier to each designated site in Scotland, for listed buildings this always begins with "LB", for example "LB12345".)	Image
By Dulnain Bridge Wester Finlarig House And Lodge (Service Cottage)				57°18′39″N 3°40′43″W	Category B	245	Upload Photo
Muckrach Castle				57°18′17″N 3°41′05″W	Category A	249	Upload another image See more images
Rothiemurchus, Episcopal Church Of St. John The Baptist And Burial Ground				57°10′41″N 3°49′14″W	Category B	256	Upload another image See more images
Carrbridge, Duthill Parish Church, (Former United Free Church Of Scotland Now Church Of Scotland)				57°16′52″N 3°48′49″W	Category B	262	Upload Photo
Aviemore, Dalfaber Road, Pine Bank (Former Craigellachie House)				57°10′58″N 3°49′52″W	Category C(S)	48029	Upload Photo
Aviemore, Grampian Road, Glenspey Including Boundary Walls And Gatepiers				57°11′46″N 3°49′46″W	Category C(S)	48031	Upload Photo
Carrbridge, Old Bridge Over River Dulnain				57°17′02″N 3°48′57″W	Category B	241	Upload another image See more images
Clury				57°17′34″N 3°42′37″W	Category B	242	Upload Photo
Boat Of Garten Railway Station, Footbridge, Signal Box And Former Station Master's House				57°14′53″N 3°45′10″W	Category B	258	Upload another image See more images
Broomhill Bridge Over River Spey				57°16′51″N 3°39′56″W	Category A	260	Upload another image See more images
Locomotive Shed And Offices, Strathspey Railway, Aviemore				57°11′37″N 3°49′31″W	Category B	43492	Upload another image See more images
Rothiemurchus, The Polchar				57°09′53″N 3°50′02″W	Category B	236	Upload Photo
Dulnain Bridge, Bridge Over River Dulnain				57°18′12″N 3°40′00″W	Category B	243	Upload Photo
Rothiemurchus, The Doune West Lodge				57°09′26″N 3°50′42″W	Category C(S)	255	Upload another image
Aviemore Railway Station With Island Platform, Footbridge And Fencing				57°11′19″N 3°49′45″W	Category A	257	Upload another image See more images
Broomhill House				57°16′58″N 3°40′17″W	Category B	261	Upload Photo
Aviemore, Grampian Road, Shelter Stone				57°11′38″N 3°49′46″W	Category C(S)	48032	Upload Photo
Carrbridge Station				57°16′47″N 3°49′41″W	Category B	6636	Upload another image See more images
Slochd, Ortunan Bridge				57°17′24″N 3°55′19″W	Category C(S)	238	Upload another image
Kinchurdy				57°13′19″N 3°45′54″W	Category B	248	Upload Photo
Rothiemurchus, The Doune Farm Cottages				57°10′04″N 3°50′39″W	Category B	254	Upload Photo
Dulnain Bridge, Skye Of Curr Hotel (Formerly Tigh-Na-Sgiadh) Including Boundary Wall And Gatepiers To Se				57°18′08″N 3°40′24″W	Category B	49528	Upload Photo
Rothiemurchus, Old Church And Burial Ground				57°09′39″N 3°50′38″W	Category B	234	Upload Photo
Duthill, Seafield Mausolea				57°17′49″N 3°46′05″W	Category B	247	Upload another image
Rothiemurchus, The Doune				57°09′55″N 3°50′37″W	Category B	253	Upload another image See more images
Strathspey Boat Of Garten, Deishar Road,				57°14′55″N 3°45′18″W	Category C(S)	259	Upload Photo
Loch An Eilein, Lime Kiln Cottage and Lime Kiln				57°08′51″N 3°49′30″W	Category C(S)	6648	Upload another image
Rothiemurchus, St. Columba's Church (Former Free Church then Church Of Scotland)				57°10′32″N 3°48′57″W	Category B	233	Upload another image
By Slochd, Bridge Over Allt Slochd Mhuic				57°16′35″N 3°55′17″W	Category B	239	Upload another image
Sluggan Bridge Over River Dulnain				57°16′29″N 3°52′33″W	Category A	240	Upload another image See more images
Rothiemurchus, James Martineau Memorial				57°09′52″N 3°50′09″W	Category C(S)	250	Upload another image
Carrbridge, Village Hall				57°16′54″N 3°48′50″W	Category B	263	Upload another image See more images
Rothiemurchus, Old Manse				57°09′49″N 3°49′52″W	Category B	235	Upload Photo
By Dulnain Bridge, Garth Of Finlarig				57°18′38″N 3°40′34″W	Category C(S)	244	Upload Photo
Duthill, Old Parish Church, Burial Ground				57°17′49″N 3°46′06″W	Category B	246	Upload another image See more images
Rothiemurchus, Dell Steading (Rothiemurchus Estate Office)				57°10′48″N 3°48′51″W	Category B	252	Upload another image
Aviemore, Grampian Road, Cairngorm Hotel				57°11′18″N 3°49′48″W	Category C(S)	48030	Upload another image
Slochd Mhuic Railway Viaduct				57°17′24″N 3°54′56″W	Category B	237	Upload another image See more images
Rothiemurchus, Croft House				57°09′42″N 3°48′56″W	Category A	251	Upload Photo
Aviemore Railway Station, Signal Box				57°11′31″N 3°49′40″W	Category B	52063	Upload another image

== Key ==
The scheme for classifying buildings in Scotland is:

- Category A: "buildings of national or international importance, either architectural or historic; or fine, little-altered examples of some particular period, style or building type."
- Category B: "buildings of regional or more than local importance; or major examples of some particular period, style or building type, which may have been altered."
- Category C: "buildings of local importance; lesser examples of any period, style, or building type, as originally constructed or moderately altered; and simple traditional buildings which group well with other listed buildings."

In March 2016 there were 47,288 listed buildings in Scotland. Of these, 8% were Category A, and 50% were Category B, with the remaining 42% being Category C.

== See also ==
- List of listed buildings in Highland
