= List of listed buildings in Croy and Dalcross =

This is a list of listed buildings in the parish of Croy and Dalcross in Highland, Scotland.

== List ==
Name	Location	Date Listed	Grid Ref. (Note: Sometimes known as OSGB36, the grid reference (where provided) is based on the British national grid reference system used by the Ordnance Survey. • "Guide to National Grid". Ordnance Survey. • "Get-a-map". Ordnance Survey.)	Geo-coordinates	Notes	LB Number (Note: Historic Environment Scotland assign a unique alphanumeric identifier to each designated site in Scotland, for listed buildings this always begins with "LB", for example "LB12345".)	Image
Holme Rose				57°30′43″N 3°59′38″W	Category A	1812	Upload Photo
Cantray Home Farm				57°30′26″N 4°00′19″W	Category B	1708	Upload another image
2, 3, 4, 5, 6 Clephanton Village				57°31′47″N 3°58′37″W	Category B	1837	Upload Photo
Dalcross Castle And Garden Wall				57°30′30″N 4°02′25″W	Category A	1713	Upload another image See more images
Culloden Battlefield, Old Leanach Farmhouse				57°28′40″N 4°05′41″W	Category B	1712	Upload another image See more images
Dalcross Castle, Entrance Arch And Gate Lodge				57°30′32″N 4°02′30″W	Category C(S)	1714	Upload another image
Croy Parish Church Of Scotland, Watch-House And Burial Ground				57°31′24″N 4°00′39″W	Category B	1710	Upload Photo
Holme Rose Bridge Over River Nairn				57°30′49″N 3°58′49″W	Category B	1840	Upload Photo
Milton Of Kilravock Former Kilravock Mill				57°31′58″N 3°56′35″W	Category B	1842	Upload Photo
White Bridge By Clephanton Over River Nairn				57°31′37″N 3°57′54″W	Category A	1843	Upload another image See more images
Cantray Mill				57°30′25″N 4°00′08″W	Category B	1836	Upload Photo
7, 8, Clephanton Village				57°31′46″N 3°58′37″W	Category B	1838	Upload Photo
9 Clephanton Village				57°31′46″N 3°58′37″W	Category B	1839	Upload Photo
Kilravock Castle, Dovecote And Garden Walls				57°31′08″N 3°58′54″W	Category A	1841	Upload another image See more images
Holme Rose Gate Lodge And Gate Piers				57°30′31″N 4°00′11″W	Category B	1814	Upload Photo
Croy Church Of Scotland Parish Manse				57°31′29″N 4°00′41″W	Category B	1711	Upload Photo
Holme Rose Walled Garden				57°30′38″N 3°59′35″W	Category C(S)	1813	Upload Photo
Balfreish				57°29′53″N 4°00′26″W	Category C(S)	1834	Upload Photo
Cantray Bridge Over River Nairn				57°30′24″N 4°00′16″W	Category B	1835	Upload another image
Clava, Nairn Viaduct Over The Nairn River, Otherwise Known As Culloden Moor Viaduct				57°28′41″N 4°03′46″W	Category A	1709	Upload another image See more images
Daltullich Mains House				57°27′00″N 4°06′21″W	Category B	1715	Upload Photo

== Key ==
The scheme for classifying buildings in Scotland is:

- Category A: "buildings of national or international importance, either architectural or historic; or fine, little-altered examples of some particular period, style or building type."
- Category B: "buildings of regional or more than local importance; or major examples of some particular period, style or building type, which may have been altered."
- Category C: "buildings of local importance; lesser examples of any period, style, or building type, as originally constructed or moderately altered; and simple traditional buildings which group well with other listed buildings."

In March 2016 there were 47,288 listed buildings in Scotland. Of these, 8% were Category A, and 50% were Category B, with the remaining 42% being Category C.

== See also ==
- List of listed buildings in Highland
