= Glen Loy Aqueduct =

Bridge in Highland, Scotland

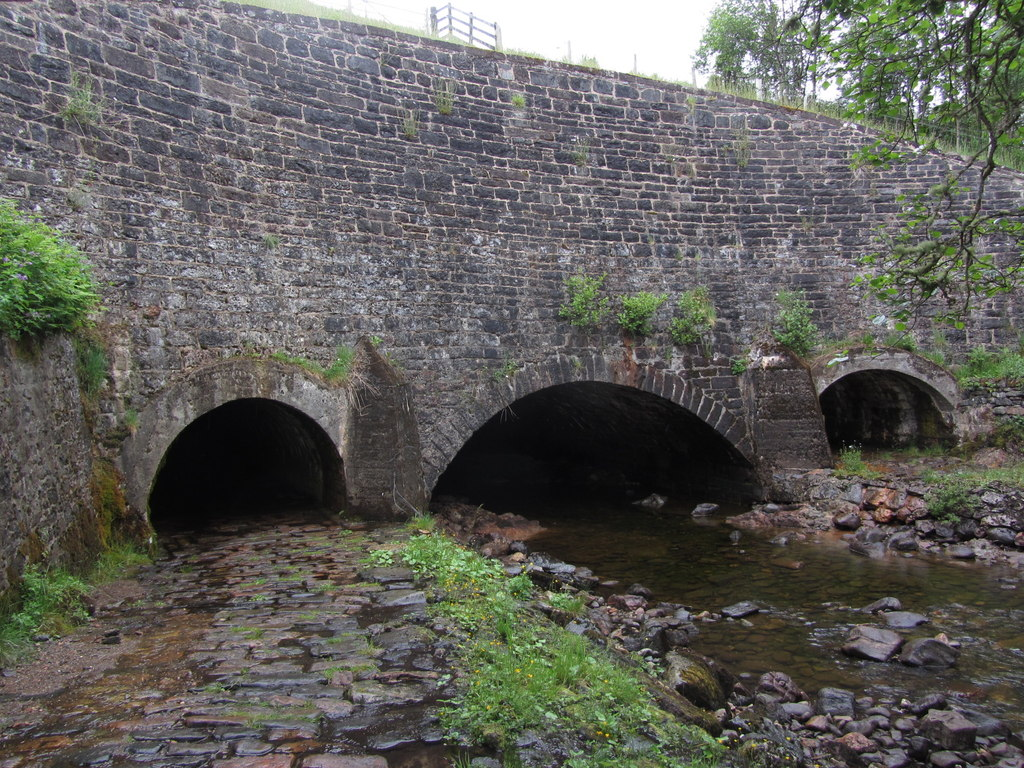
- Bridge crossing the River Loy
- Coordinates: 56.89026°N 5.03985°W
- Carries: Caledonian Canal
- Crosses: River Loy

History
- Designer: Thomas Telford
- Opened: 1806

Listed Building – Category A
- Official name: Caledonian Canal, Aqueduct Over The River Loy
- Designated: 2 August 1977
- Reference no.: LB7085

Location
- Interactive map of Glen Loy Aqueduct

The Glen Loy Aqueduct (or Glenloy Aqueduct) carries the Caledonian Canal over the River Loy, near Muirshearlich, between Banavie and Gairlochy.

== History ==
The aqueduct was built between March and October 1806.

== Design ==
It has three arches, of spans 10 feet (3.0 m), 25 feet (7.6 m) and 10 feet (3.0 m). The river runs through the middle arch, and roadways for pedestrian or animal use through the side arches paved with large cobbles. The road tunnels are approximately 260 feet (79 m) long under the canal.

It is one of six aqueducts between Neptune's Staircase and Loch Lochy.

== See also ==
- List of bridges in Scotland
