= Mucomir Hydro-Electric Scheme =

Power station near Spean Bridge, Scotland

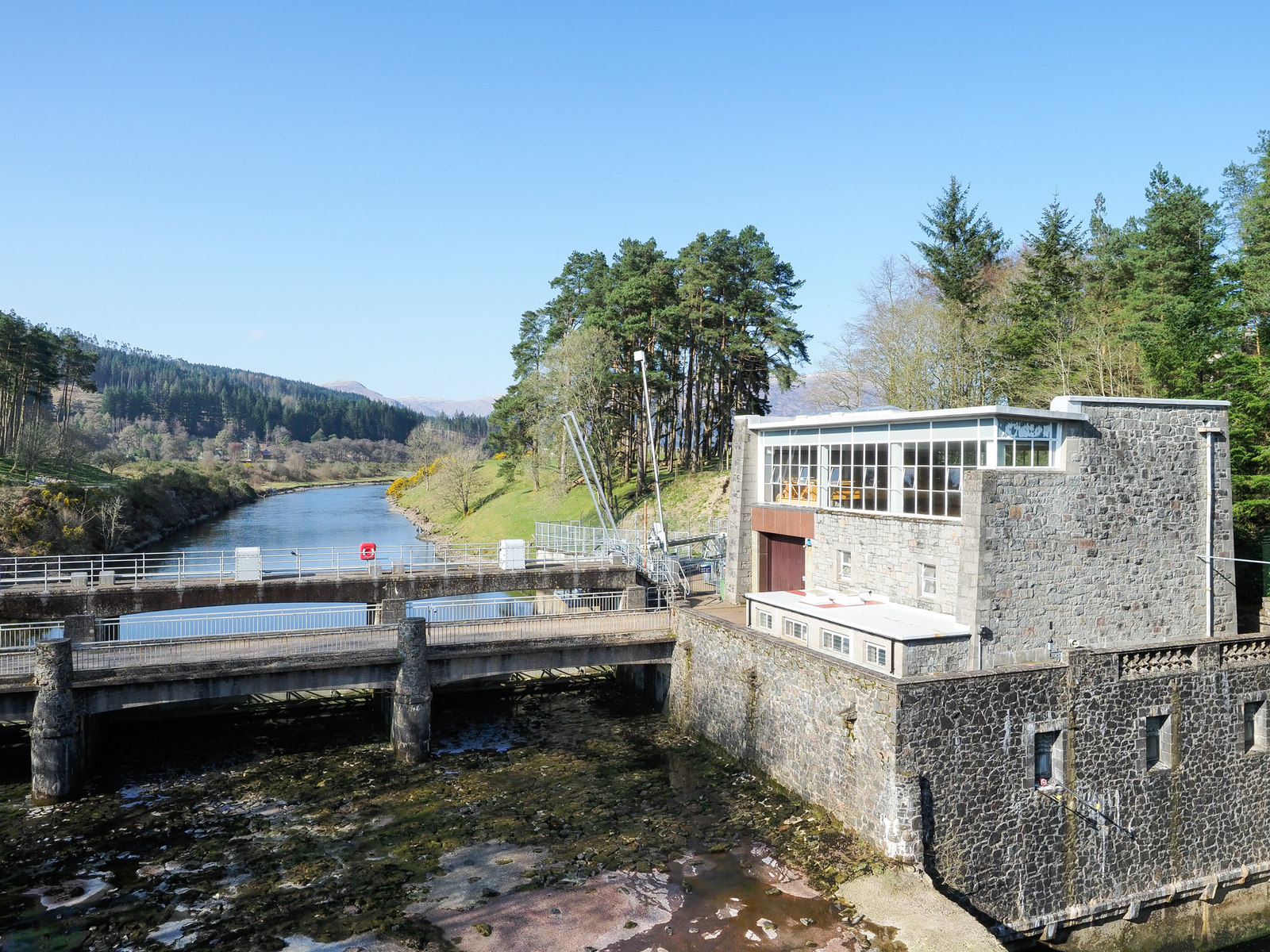
- The power station and the Mucomir Cut

- Location within Highland
- Country: Scotland
- Location: Gairlochy, Inverness-shire
- Coordinates: 56.9108°N 4.9851°W
- Purpose: Power
- Status: Operational
- Opening date: 1962
- Owner: SSE

Mucomir Hydro-Electric Scheme is a small-scale hydro-electric power station, built by the North of Scotland Hydro-Electric Board and commissioned in 1962. It is located on the Mucomir Cut, a waterway created by Thomas Telford during the building of the Caledonian Canal to replace the existing course of the River Lochy below Loch Lochy, so that the old course could be used for the canal. The power station was substantially upgraded in 2017.

== History ==
The North of Scotland Hydro-Electric Board was created by the Hydro-electric Development (Scotland) Act 1943, a measure championed by the politician Tom Johnston while he was Secretary of State for Scotland. Johnston's vision was for a public body that could build hydro-electric stations throughout the Highlands. Profits made by selling bulk electricity to the Scottish lowlands would be used to fund "the economic development and social improvement of the North of Scotland." Private consumers would be offered a supply of cheap electricity, and their connection to that supply would not reflect the actual cost of its provision in remote and sparsely populated areas.

The chairman of the new Board was to be Lord Airlie, who had initially been critical of the 1943 Act because its scope was too limited. The deputy chairman and chief executive was Edward MacColl, an engineer with wide experience of hydro-electric projects and electrical distribution networks. It soon became clear that MacColl intended to push ahead with the aspirations of the Act at breakneck speeds. He produced a list of 102 potential sites in just three months, and in June 1944, the first constructional scheme was published. This was for the Loch Sloy scheme, which had a ready market for bulk supplies to nearby Clydeside, but it included two smaller schemes, to demonstrate the Board's commitment to supplying remote areas.

The Mucomir power station was the North of Scotland Hydro-Electri Board's Constructional Scheme No.26. The site chosen for the station was on the Mucomir Cut. Thomas Telford when constructing the Caledonian Canal was faced with a problem where the canal entered Loch Lochy. The only obvious route was that occupied by the River Lochy, and the solution adopted was to cut a new channel for the river between the loch and the River Spean, which joins the River Lochy a little further downstream. They constructed a bridge over the channel, so that drovers could still use the route to bring cattle from Skye, and dug out the bedrock below the bridge so that the river entered the Spean by a waterfall. The cut was excavated in 1813, but the river was only transferred to its new course in 1821, to allow the level of Loch Lochy to be raised by 12 feet (3.7 m). The channel under the bridge proved to be too small, and the level of the loch continued to rise, so the cut had to be made wider and deeper to overcome this.

The station is on the left bank of the Mucomir Cut, and by late 1955, it had been sanctioned by Parliament, but no work had begun. The estimated cost at the time was £375,000. Preparatory work had started by 1959, and included the erection of a Bailey bridge across the cut. A temporary dam was built across the river, but this failed on 8-9 June 1959, and had to be reconstructed. Other work included a temporary fish ladder, to enable migrating fish to reach Loch Lochy, parts of which suffered a catastrophic failure in June 1960. A weir built across the river impounds the water, so that it can be fed to the turbines. A tailrace from the power station building carries the water to be discharged back into the river below Mucomir Bridge. This arrangement provides a head of 23 feet (7.0 m) for the turbine, which can produce 1.95 MW, and the station, which was commissioned in 1962, generates around 9,000 MWh per year.

=== Operation ===
As a result of the passing of the Reservoir Act 1975, Loch Lochy was classified as a reservoir, because its level had been artificially raised. The Gairlochy Flood Relief Scheme was implemented, to raise the level of the lock gates at Gairlochy, and build a flood defence wall from the lock around the back of the lock-keeper's houses. Additionally, the Mucomir Cut was dredged to return it to the size it was in 1843, and to mitigate the possibility of one of the power station's three 90-foot (27 m) automated sluice gates from becoming blocked, felled a large number of trees, to prevent them falling into the water in flood conditions. The work was completed in 1988.

The temporary fish pass was replaced by a Borland fish lift, which works in a similar fashion to a navigation lock. The fish lift takes around an hour to fill, and is operated at least four times a day from April to November, including once during the night.

In 2002, the Renewables Obligation (Scotland) legislation was introduced. It was conceived as a way to promote the development of small-scale hydro-electric, wave power, tidal power, photovoltaics, wind power and biomas schemes, but by the time it came into force, the definition of small scale had been increased from 5 MW to 10 MW and then 20 MW, and existing hydro-electric stations that had been refurbished to improve efficiency could be included. Mucomir at 2 MW could be eligible, but was the only station operated by SSE with a capacity below 20 MW which had not qualified for Renewable Obligation Certificates in 2007.

By the mid-2010s, the power station had been operating for over 50 years, and in 2017, the turbine was replaced. The new machine includes a revised profile for the turbine blades, making it easier for fish to swim through without being harmed. The upgrade included a new control system, allowing the station to be operated remotely, and better monitoring of faults. Most of the work was carried out by the German engineering company Voith. The generator was also refurbished. It had a DC exciter, and the commutator was wearing unevenly, resulting in the production of lots of dust. To overcome this, it was replaced by a brushless AC exciter. The generator, which is driven by a Kaplan turbine, runs relatively slowly at 150 rpm, and so the new exciter has 40 poles. It produces power at 3,300 volts, and the refurbishment was completed in June 2017 by Quartzelec.

== Bibliography ==
- Cameron, A D (2005). The Caledonian Canal. Birlinn. ISBN 978-1-84158-403-4.
- Dekker, Nick (2008). "Public Petition No. PE1184" (PDF). Scottish Parliament. Archived (PDF) from the original on 10 January 2024.
- Miller, James (2002). The Dam Builders - Power from the Glens. Birlinn. ISBN 978-1-84158-225-2.
- Payne, Peter L (1988). The Hydro. Aberdeen University Press. ISBN 978-0-08-036584-8.
- Swap (June 2005). "Subsidies and Subterfuge" (PDF). Scottish Wind Assessment Project. Archived (PDF) from the original on 11 October 2022.
- Wood, Emma (2002). The Hydro Boys. Luath Press. ISBN 978-1-84282-016-2.
