= Loch Duntelchaig =

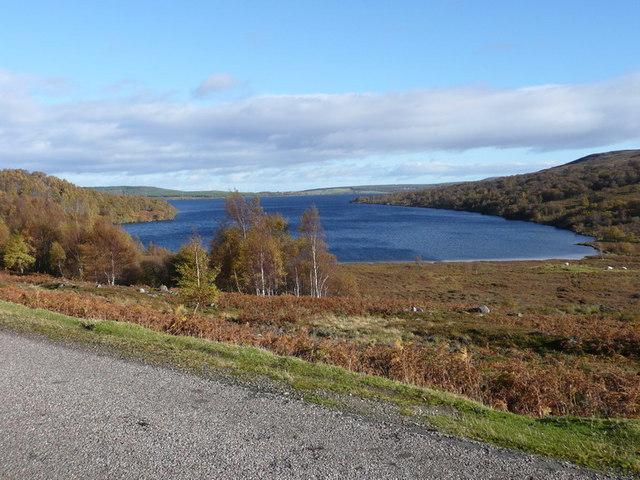
- View of Loch Duntelchaig.

- Location within Scotland
- Location: Inverness-shire, Scottish Highlands, Scotland
- Coordinates: 57.350°N 4.299°W
- Type: loch
- Max. length: 5 kilometres (3.1 mi)
- Max. width: 1.75 kilometres (1.09 mi)

Loch Duntelchaig (from the Scottish Gaelic Loch Dun Seilcheig) is a freshwater loch in the traditional county of Inverness-shire in the Scottish Highlands. It extends 5 kilometres (3.1 mi) from the southwest to its outflow in the northeast and measures up to 1.75 kilometres (1.09 mi) at its widest. The loch drains via Loch a Chlachain into the River Nairn. Loch Duntelchaig is over 60 metres (200 ft) deep towards its south end. It is also the main reservoir for Inverness sitting less than a kilometre from the secondary reservoir Loch Ashie.
