= Noss Head Lighthouse =

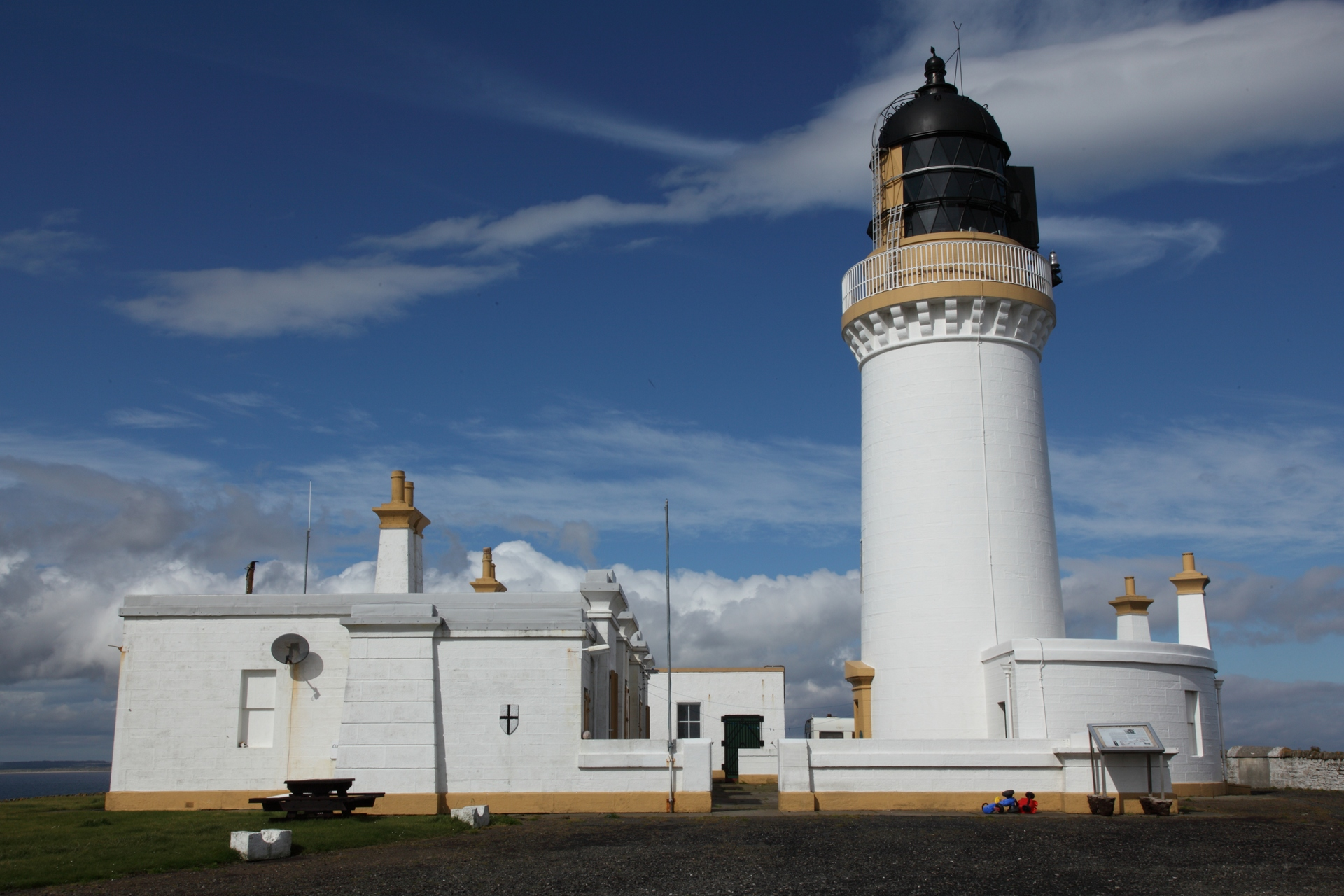
- Noss Head in 2011
- Location: Wick; Highland
- OS grid: ND3881255012
- Coordinates: 58.479°N 3.0509°W

Tower
- Constructed: 1849
- Designed by: Alan Stevenson
- Construction: masonry tower
- Automated: 1987
- Height: 18 metres (59 ft)
- Shape: cylindrical tower with balcony and lantern attached to 1-storey keeper's house
- Markings: white tower, black lantern, ochre trim
- Operator: Northern Lighthouse Board
- Heritage: category A listed building

Light
- First lit: 18 June 1849
- Focal height: 53 metres (174 ft)
- Lens: second order Fresnel lens
- Range: 18 nautical miles (33 km; 21 mi)
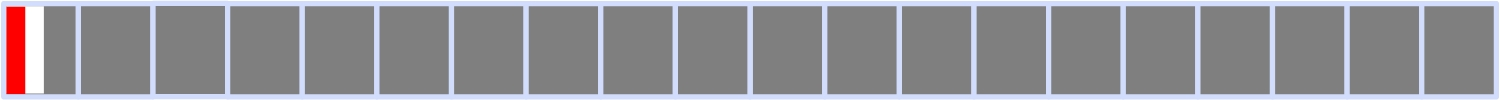
- Characteristic: Fl WR 20s (Fl. 0.5, ec. 19,5 seconds)

The Noss Head Lighthouse is an active 19th-century lighthouse near Wick in Caithness in the Highland council area of Scotland. It is located at the end of Noss Head, a peninsula on the north-west coast of Caithness that overlooks Sinclairs Bay, three miles north-east of Wick. It is notable as being the first lighthouse that was built with a diagonally-paned lantern room.

== History ==
The need for the lighthouse was promoted by the Northern Lights Commissioners. The light first entered service in 1849, and consists of an 18-metre-high (59 ft) cylindrical tower, which is painted white. It supports a single gallery and a lantern with a black cupola. There are 76 steps to the top of the tower. Adjacent to the tower are a pair of keeper's cottages and subsidiary buildings, bounded by a walled compound.

The lighthouse was built by Mr. Arnot of Inverness, with the construction being overseen by the notable lighthouse engineer Alan Stevenson (uncle of Scottish author Robert Louis Stevenson), who for the first time used diagonal glass panes and framing for the exterior lantern. Considered to be both stronger, and less likely to interrupt the light from the optic, the design was employed as the standard for all future lighthouses built by the Board.

As a way to provide work for those local people who had been affected by the Highland potato famine, and needed Poor Relief, labourers were hired at a rate of 3s/6d per day (£18 as of 2025) to construct an access road from Wick to the lighthouse.

In 1987 the light was converted to automatic operation. This same year, all of the former keepers’ cottages and related structures were sold, along with the 39 acres of land upon which they were built. The sole exception being Noss Head Lighthouse Tower which is still owned and operated by the Northern Lighthouse Board (NLB). Following automation, the original Fresnel lens and mechanical drive train from the lighthouse were removed and are now exhibited on two floors of the Wick Heritage Centre, one of the few lens and drive train from this period that are still in full working order.

Between 1997 and 2014, the Clan Sinclair Trust created a residential study centre for research into the clan's history in the buildings on the site. The study centre was closed when the owner, Ian Sinclair, died in 2014. Since then, the land and the buildings on the site, other than the tower, have all passed into separate private ownership.

Between October 2017 and May 2018, the Northern Lighthouse Board undertook repairs and maintenance of the main Lighthouse Tower. On 23rd May 2017, the entire lighthouse station, with the sole exception of the tower was purchased by a private company for £200,000. In order to ensure renovation of the whole lighthouse station, the Northern Lighthouse Board were hosted by the private owners of the adjacent (former) lighthouse keepers' homes. The private owners in liaison with Northern Lighthouse Board renovated all of the buildings at the same time. As a consequence, the lighthouse station had a complete renovation and not just piecemeal. This was celebrated when the Northern Lighthouse Board asked the private owner if they were happy for the local Member of The Scottish Parliament, Mr David Stewart MSP to inspect both the renovated tower and restored (former) lighthouse keepers' houses. Permission was gladly given and Mr Stewart MSP visited Noss Head Lighthouse Station to inspect the works that had been completed.

In October 2017 the main rotational light at Noss Head Lighthouse Tower was extinguished by the Northern Lighthouse Board and a new, static LED beam was installed.

== Operational details ==
With a focal height of 53m above sea level, the light can be seen for 25 nautical miles. Its light characteristic is made up of a flash of light every twenty seconds. The colour being white or red, varying with direction. The light and tower is maintained by the Northern Lighthouse Board, and is registered under the international Admiralty number A3544 and has the NGA identifier of 114-3012.

== Listed buildings ==
The Lighthouse Tower, former First Assistant and Second Assistant Keeper's Cottages, along with the Stable Block are protected as a category A listed building, and considered to be of national or international importance. The original 1849-built Principal Keeper's Cottage and Occasional Keeper's House were demolished in the 1960s, and a modern detached rectangular single-storey newbuild replaced these to the west of the main lighthouse tower. The 1960s-built structures are not listed, although they are within the environs of the category A listed properties, and as such require appropriate protocols to be observed in relation to their maintenance and upkeep. “The engine house adjacent to the lighthouse house was restored and extended in 2024–25 by the Chartered RIBA Architect Hugo Hardy.”

== In popular culture ==
In 2010, French author Sophie Jomain published the first of a series of fantasy romances with the overall title of "Les Étoiles de Noss Head" or "The Stars of Noss Head".

== See also ==
- List of lighthouses in Scotland
- List of Northern Lighthouse Board lighthouses
- List of Category A listed buildings in Highland
