= Carrbridge Packhorse Bridge =

1717 bridge in Carrbridge, Scotland

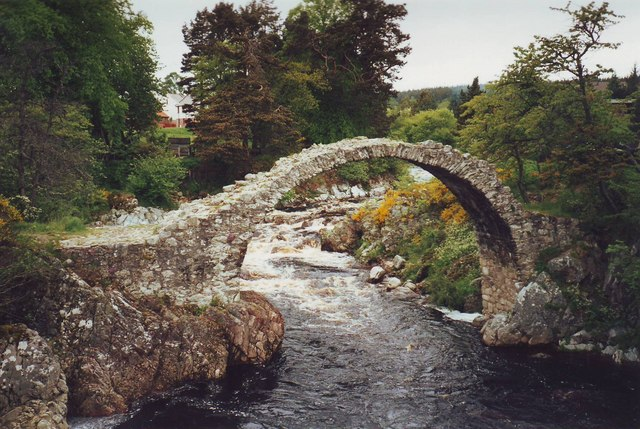
- Packhorse Bridge at Carrbridge
- Coordinates: 57°17′1.8″N 3°48′57.0″W
- Crosses: River Dulnain
- Locale: Carrbridge village
- Other name: Coffin Bridge

Characteristics
- Design: Arch
- Material: Tooled rubble
- Width: 2.14 metres (7.0 ft)
- Longest span: 12 metres (39 ft)
- No. of spans: 1

History
- Designer: John Niccelsone
- Construction end: 1717

Listed Building – Category B
- Official name: Carrbridge, Old Bridge Over River Dulnain
- Designated: 5 October 1971
- Reference no.: LB241

Location
- Interactive map of Carrbridge Packhorse Bridge

Carrbridge Packhorse Bridge, also known as Coffin Bridge, is a historic packhorse bridge in the village of Carrbridge, in the Scottish Highlands. The bridge was built in 1717 to allow funeral processions to reach Duthil Church by crossing the River Dulnain. The parapets were washed away in the 19th century. In 1971 the bridge became a Category B listed building. It has become a popular tourist attraction.

== History ==
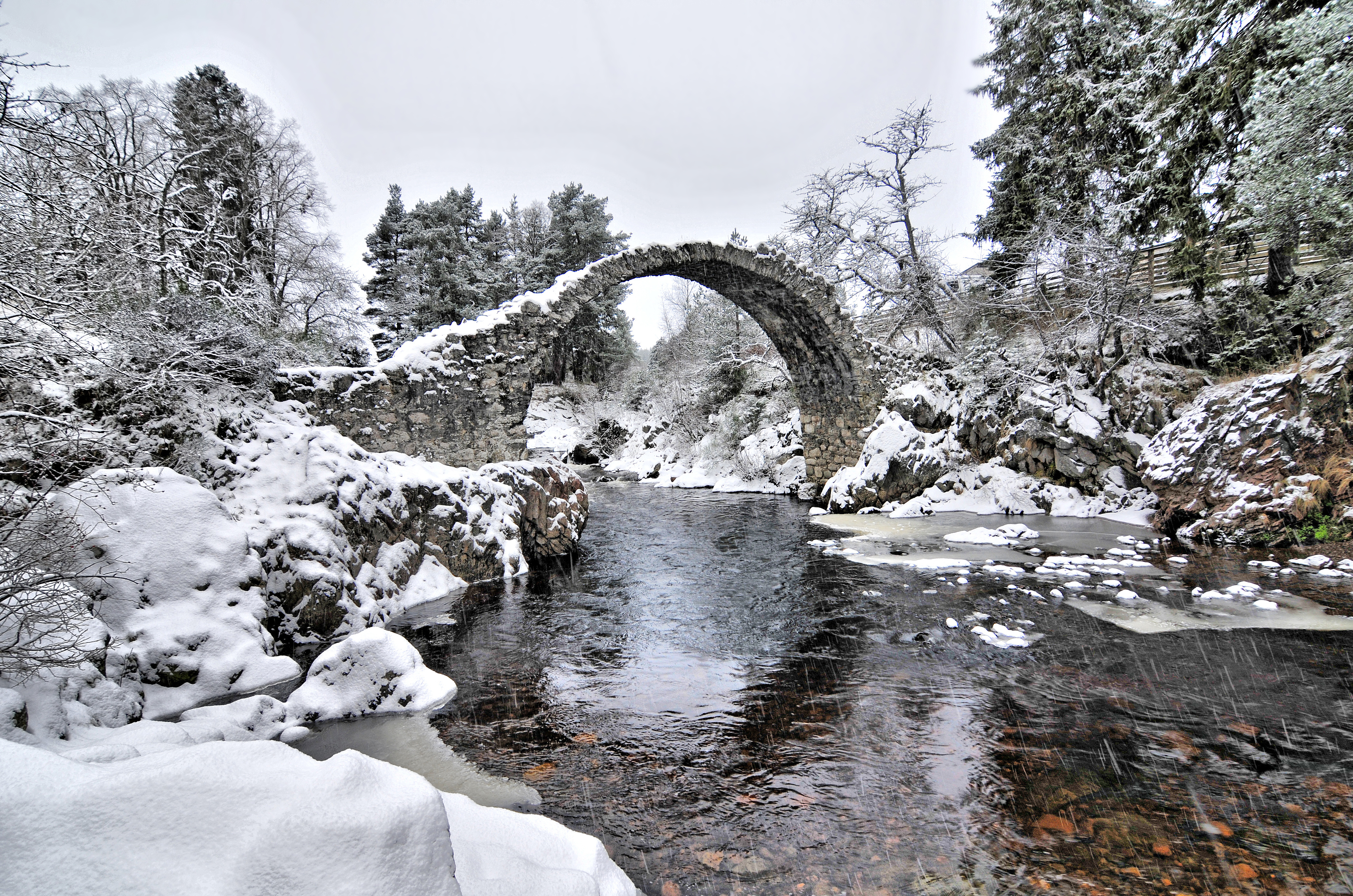
The bridge in winter

Although commonly referred to as a packhorse bridge it was constructed for general traffic, rather than for packhorses, and particularly to allow funerals to proceed across the River Dulnain to Duthil Church. Brigadier-General Alexander Grant commissioned the bridge. Stonemason John Niccelsone constructed the bridge at Lynne of Dalrachney and the £100 cost was paid for out of stipends of Duthil Church. The bridge was completed in 1717 and floods in the 1829 Muckle Spate washed away the parapets. The bridge also provided a way for tradesmen and locals to cross the river. It is the Scottish Highlands' oldest known stone bridge.

It was listed as a scheduled monument on 29 December 1958 and subsequently de-scheduled on 5 April 2016. The bridge became a Category B listed building on 5 October 1971.

== Description ==
The bridge in the village of Carrbridge is a popular tourist attraction and lies within the Cairngorms mountain area of Scotland. It has also been described as the coffin bridge. All that exists today is a slender arch across the River Dulnain. The width of the bridge between the missing side rails is 2.14 m (7.0 ft).

It is described in the Category B listing as a "High single span humpback rubble bridge; tooled rubble arch ring springing from natural rock abutment; neither surfacing nor parapet survive."

== Gallery ==
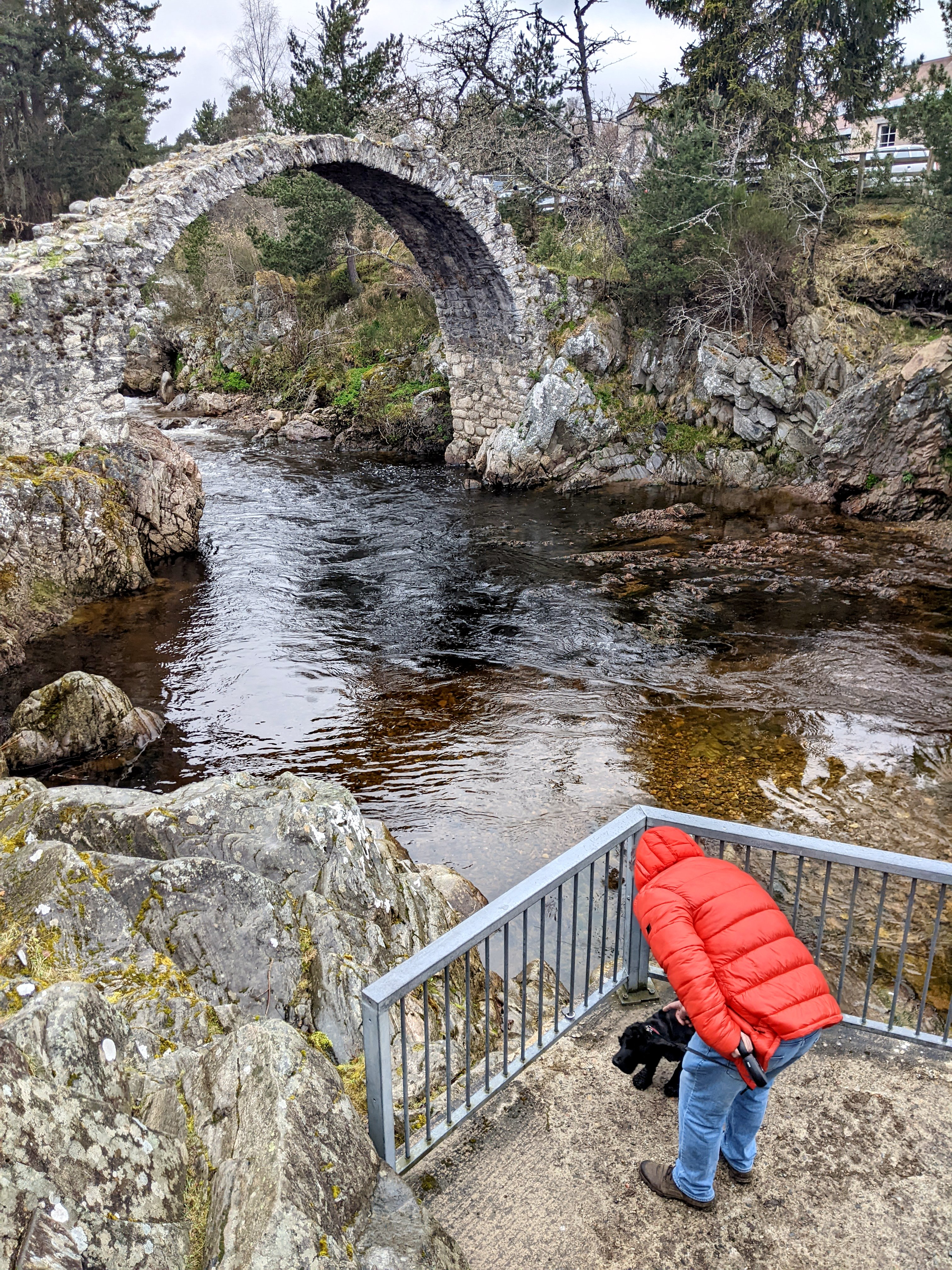
Viewing area

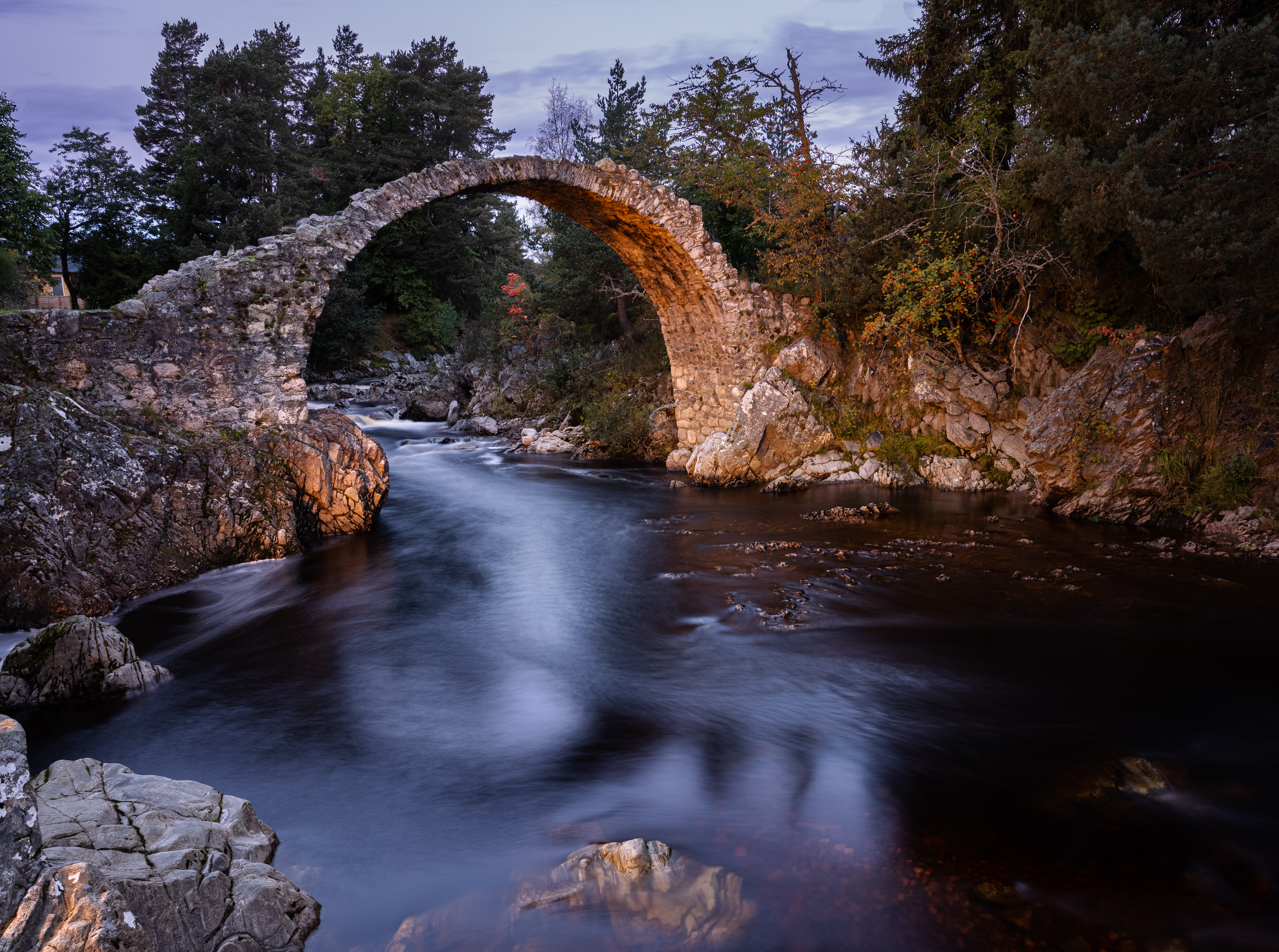
The bridge at dusk

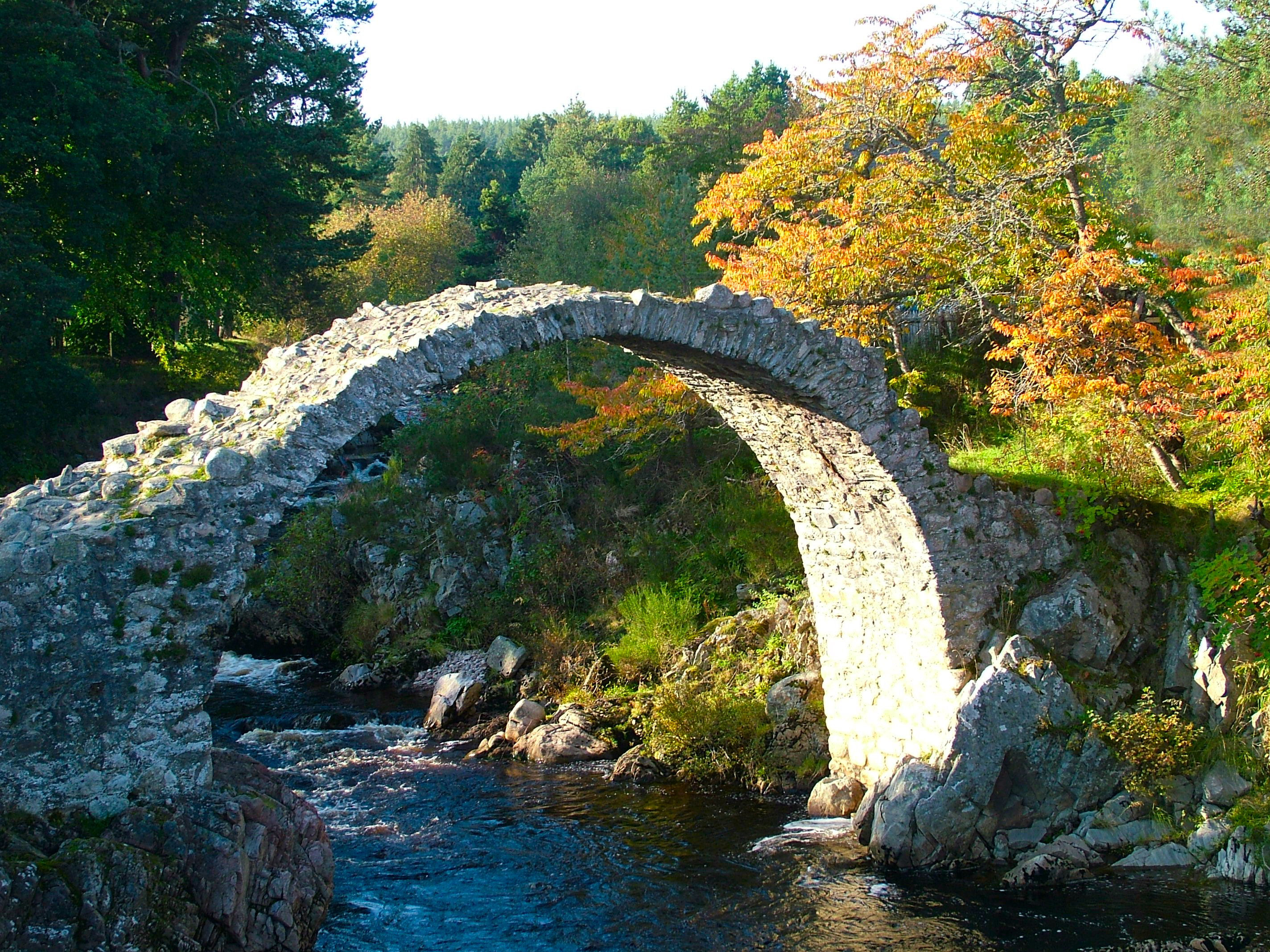
The bridge in autumn

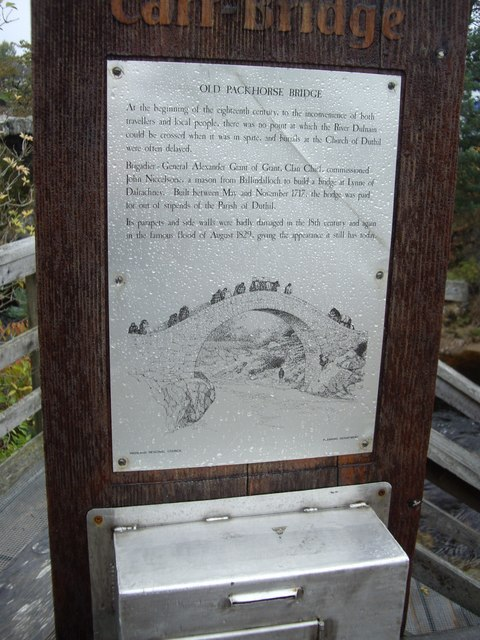
Old Packhorse Bridge plaque

== See also ==
- List of bridges in Scotland
