= Reay Parish Church =

Church in Highland, Scotland

Coordinates: 58°33′31″N 3°46′28″W

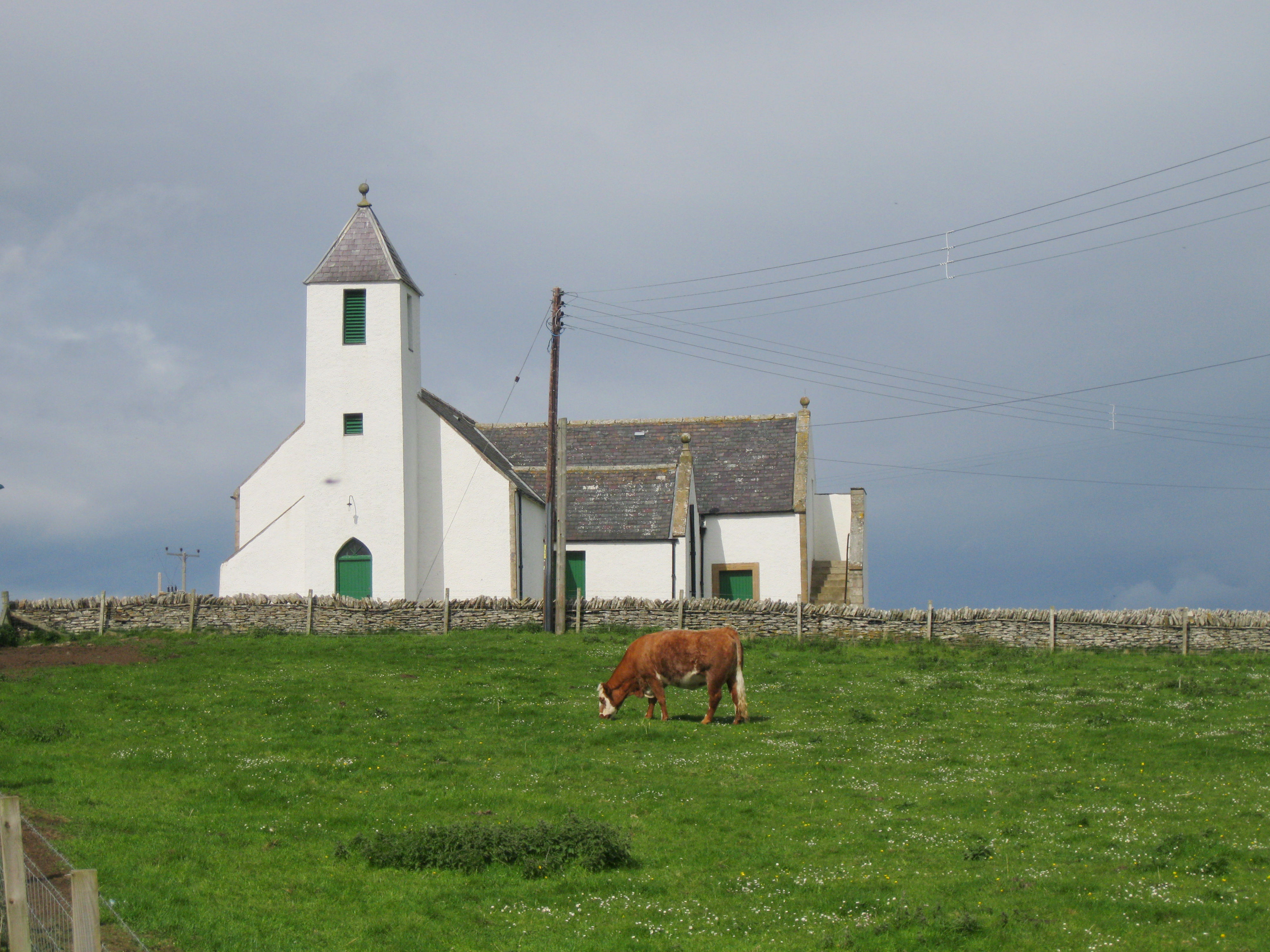
Reay Parish Church

Reay Parish Church is a Church of Scotland parish church serving Reay, Caithness. It is one of the most northerly communities on the Scottish mainland, located several miles to west of Thurso. The largest local employer is the Dounreay nuclear facility.

== History ==
Built in 1739, the church is a T-shaped church, and is protected as a category A listed building. Externally it is painted white. The wooden pulpit is probably original to the church, complete with an old sounding board as a canopy. The pulpit is on the long wall of the church with the people seated facing each other on dark varnished wooden pews along two arms of the 'T' shape; the third part was partitioned off in the 1950s to form a vestry. Sunday services prior to 2006 Union with Strathy and Halladale were held at 10.45 am each Sunday, with communion twice yearly (on the last Sunday of April and September), following which they now take place at 11.00 on the first and third Sundays in the month.

In 1989, the church building celebrated its 250th anniversary. The celebrations included a major restoration programme, a visit by Queen Elizabeth The Queen Mother and a visit by the Moderator of the General Assembly of the Church of Scotland, Reverend Dr William McDonald. The minister, Reverend James Dewar, who moved to Edinburgh in 2000 wrote a history of the church, "The Old White House of God". (now out of print, but available in Thurso library).

In 1994, Reay Parish Church was linked with neighbouring Strathy & Halladale Parish Church in Sutherland, being henceforth served by the same minister. The linked parishes are, however, within the Church of Scotland’s Presbytery of Caithness.

In 2006 Reay, Strathy and Halladale parishes were united into one "North Coast Parish Church" (NCPC), one congregation retaining and alternating separate places of worship.

The first Minister of NCPC was the Reverend Paul R Read, who was inducted to the parish on 18 August 2006.

Reverend David Macartney was ordained and inducted as minister of the North Coast Parish Church on 22 September 2017 and left his charge in June 2023.
