= Fresgoe =

Coordinates: 58.569311°N 3.794453°W

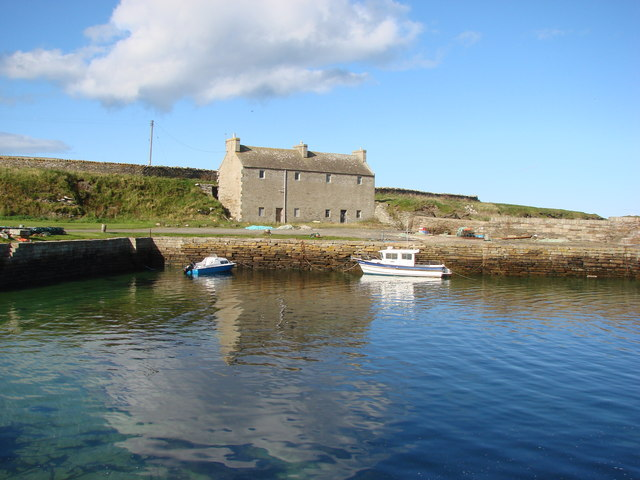
- The harbour at Fresgoe

- Location within the Caithness area
- OS grid reference: NC957659
- Council area: Highland
- Lieutenancy area: Inverness-shire
- Country: Scotland
- Sovereign state: United Kingdom
- Postcode district: KW14 7
- Dialling code: Thurso
- Police: Scotland
- Fire: Scottish
- Ambulance: Scottish

Fresgoe is the main harbour for the village of Reay, overlooking Sandside Bay in Caithness in the Scottish Highlands. It was built in the early 1830s, by a Major William Innes at a cost of £3000, primarily to encourage fishing and was also used on the north coast trading route.
