= River Nairn =

River in the Scottish Highlands

Coordinates: 57°35′N 3°52′W

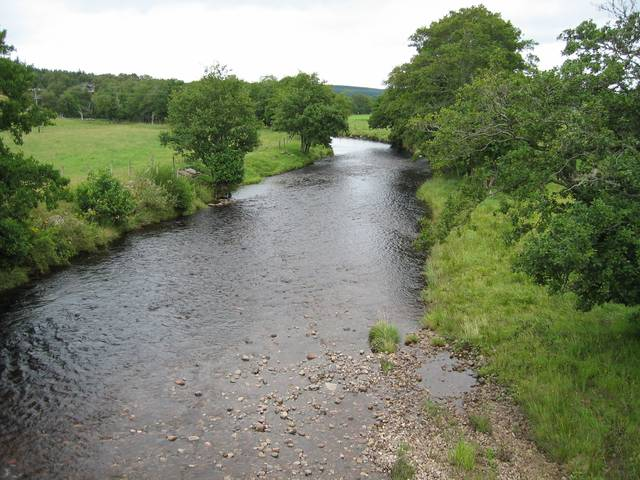
River Nairn at Inverarnie

The River Nairn (Scottish Gaelic: Narann / Abhainn Narann) is a 35 mile long river in the Scottish Highlands.

== Etymology ==
The hydronym Nairn is Pictish in origin. The name may involve *Naverna, of which the ultimate genesis is the Celtic root *(s)naf meaning "flow, swim" (cf. Welsh nawf). The toponym Nevern in Wales may be identically derived.

== Course ==
The River Nairn rises in the Monadhliath Mountains and flows northeast through Strathnairn to enter the Moray Firth at Nairn. The headwaters of the Nairn, the Allt Mor and Crom-allt Beag drop steeply down the western slopes of Càrn Ghriogair, their combined waters flowing beneath the B851 road and turning northeastwards. The young River Nairn is soon joined by the diminutive River Brin on the right bank and later by a burn draining the sizeable Loch Duntelchaig on the left. The River Farnack is the next right bank tributary, followed by the Craggie Burn near the A9 road crossing of the Nairn at Daviot.

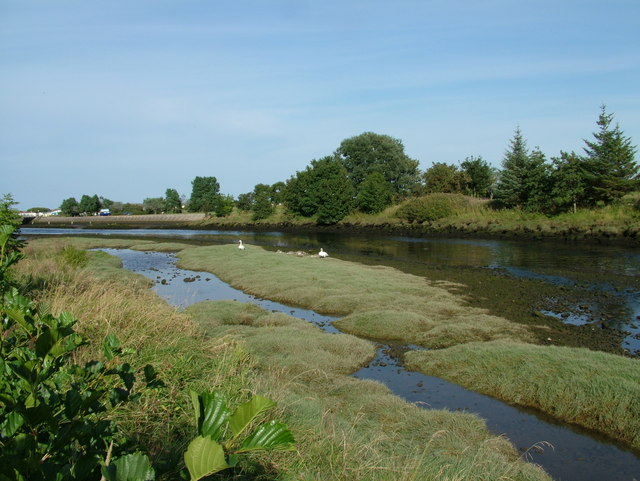
River Nairn at Nairn

The river continues to flow past Drummossie Moor which lies to its northwest and indeed past Culloden Moor, site of the battle in 1746. Passing beneath the Culloden Viaduct carrying the mainline railway between Perth and Inverness, it then runs between Culloden Forest and Assich Forest to pass beneath the B9090 road between Clephanton and Cawdor. Its last major tributary, the Allt Dearg joins from the right and the river continues northeastwards passing beneath the B9090 once again before reaching the town of Nairn.

The Allt Dearg and its major tributary the Riereach Burn rise on the northern slopes of Carn nan Trì Tighearnan and flow north to meet the Nairn.
