= Reay =

Village in Caithness, Scotland

Coordinates: 58.559°N 3.775°W

Reay: Scottish Gaelic: Ràth
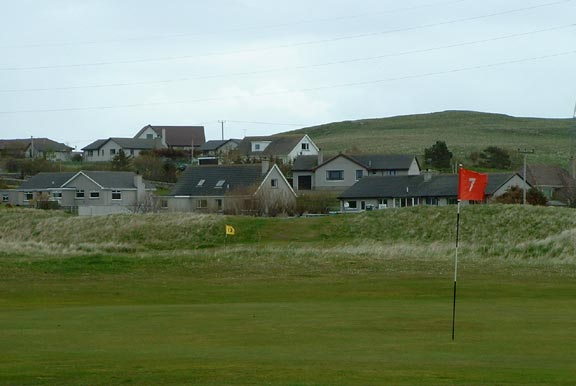

- Location within the Caithness area
- OS grid reference: NC967648
- Council area: Highland
- Lieutenancy area: Caithness
- Country: Scotland
- Sovereign state: United Kingdom
- Post town: Thurso
- Postcode district: KW14
- Dialling code: 01847
- Police: Scotland
- Fire: Scottish
- Ambulance: Scottish
- UK Parliament: Caithness, Sutherland and Easter Ross
- Scottish Parliament: Caithness, Sutherland and Ross

Reay (/reɪ/, RAY; Scottish Gaelic: Ràth, [rˠaː]) is a village which has grown around Sandside Bay on the north coast of the Highland council area of Scotland. It is within the historic Parish of Reay and the historic county of Caithness.

The village is on the A836 road some 12 miles (19 km) west of the town of Thurso and 3 miles (4.8 km) west of Dounreay.

Along with Thurso the village grew dramatically in the mid-20th century with the development of the experimental nuclear power facility at Dounreay, where technologies such as fast breeder reactors were developed.

The last need-fire in Reay occurred about 1830.

== Toponymy ==
The origin of the name is uncertain, but possibilities include the Gaelic Reidh (a flat place) or Ratha (a fort or enclosure). Possibilities from Norse include Ra (a boundary marker) or Vra (a nook or corner). Another possibility is the word Ra, a now obsolete word for the yardarm of a boat. A prehistoric mound at the west end of the beach is called Cnocstanger, which means pole hill.

== History ==
The area around the village has been occupied for millennia. Within the modern village are the remains of a stone circle, several Viking houses and burials, the site of a Bronze Age settlement and a mound which contains the layered remains of several Simple Atlantic Roundhouses. The church in Reay, which is still in use, was built in 1739 to a highly unusual T-plan, and is now a category A listed building. The village contains the remains of a far earlier church, dating from the 16th century but on an ancient dedication to St Colman, along with its small, walled graveyard. The existent remains of this old church include a 9th-century cross slab. Although there are none actually within the village, the Parish of Reay contains the remains of several brochs. In 1437, the MacKays defeated the men of Caithness at Sandside Bay in the battle known as the Sandside Chase, turning there on the pursuers that had chased them away from an attempted raid.

The parish of Reay was originally partly in the county of Caithness and partly in the county of Sutherland. However, in 1891 the parish boundaries changed so that the portion of the parish of Reay that was in Sutherland was disjoined and became part of the parish of Farr in Sutherland.

Sandside House on the edge of the village is a mansion house with extensive grounds dating from 1751. It was previously owned by Thomas Pilkington, who founded Reay Village Golf Club.

== Geography ==
The parish includes the hamlets of Fresgoe, Islaud and Shebster, which are close to the boundary between Caithness and the neighbouring county of Sutherland. The parish had a parish council from 1894 to 1930, and has two neighbouring parishes in Caithness: the Parish of Thurso to the east and the Parish of Halkirk to the south. Dounreay is within the parish.

Sandside Bay is a Site of Special Scientific Interest. It is recognised by surfers as being home to a powerful high quality left-hand reef break. This, however, is extremely fickle, and requires very particular wind, swell, and tide conditions to come into shape. The break is also notorious for being very rocky, shallow, and dangerous, such is the irregular form of the reef upon which the wave breaks.

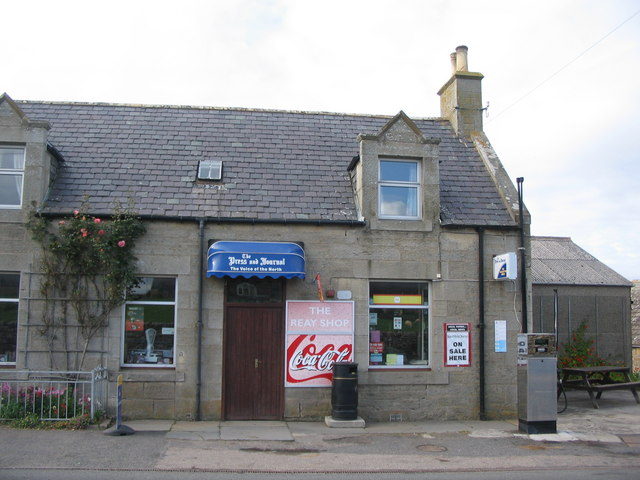
Local shop

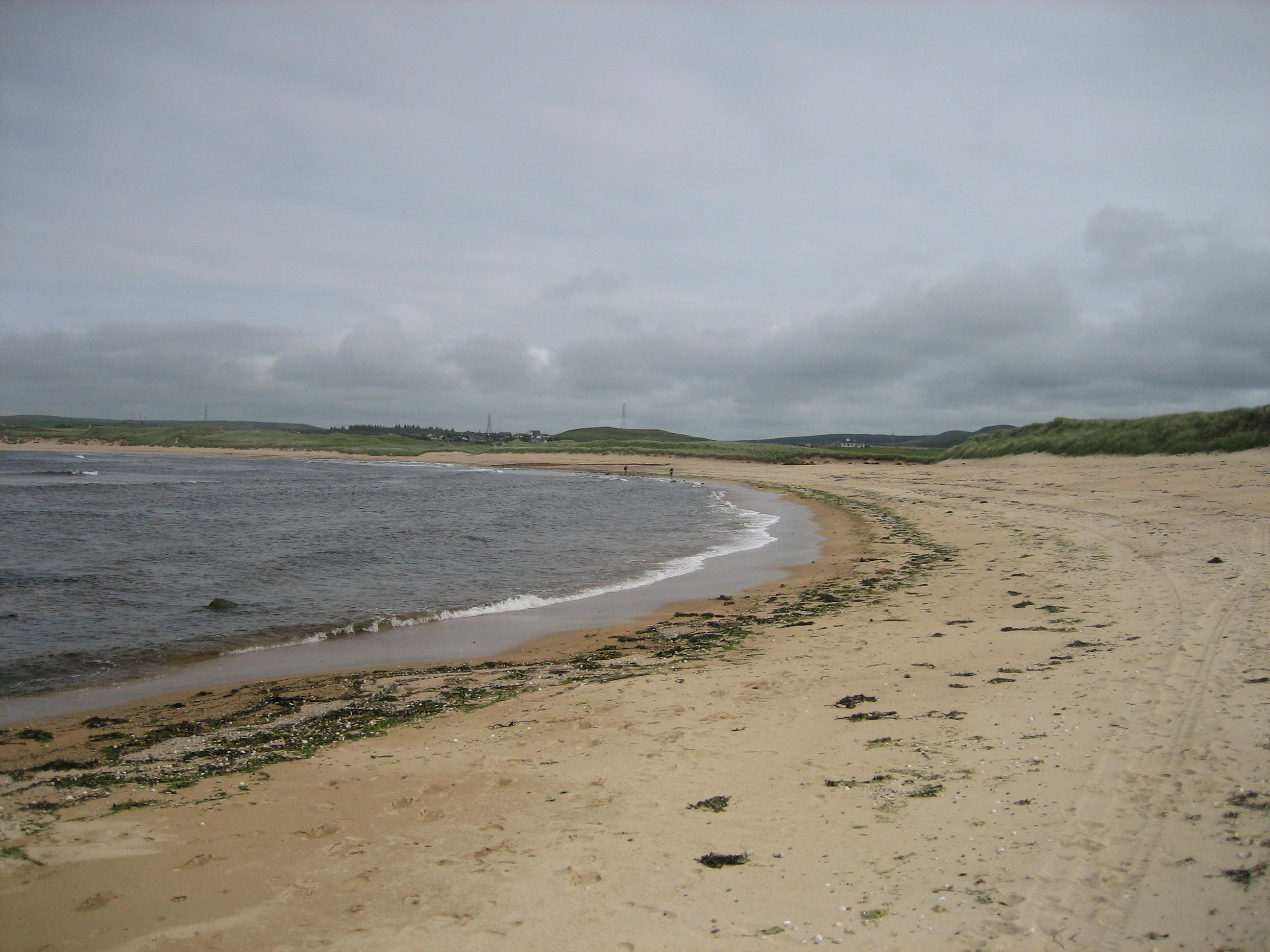
Sandside Bay in August 2006

One of the main environmental issues caused by the Dounreay Nuclear Power Development Establishment is radioactive nuclear fuel particles that have been released from the site into the sea, and are now on the seabed near the plant and in Sandside Bay. Some of these are being washed ashore, including a small number on the privately owned Sandside Bay beach which is open to the public and is part of the 10,000-acre (40 km^{2}) Sandside Estate. The Secretary of State for Environment, Food and Rural Affairs committed to clean up and open oversight of the work on 25 October 2006. The Dounreay Particles Advisory Group recommended that the particle monitoring frequency of the beach should be increased to fortnightly. . The 13th Laird of Sandside the Duke of Portland took the Government to Court to assert his ownership down to the low watermark of the estate granted by a barony of 1628 and won. The 19th Laird of Sandside since 1991, Geoffrey Minter, following the radioactive contamination beginning in 1997, took the Government-owned UKAEA to court in 2003 and won, beyond appeal, a judicial review in Scotland's highest court proving radioactive damage to the estate's land and the UKAEA to be in breach of its statutory duty under the Nuclear Installations Act. UKAEA's contractors now regularly monitor the beach due to a permanent agreement with the landowner.

== Local government ==
The village is within the Thurso and Northwest Caithness ward of the Highland Council. The ward elects four councillors by the single transferable vote system of election, which produces a form of proportional representation. It is one of seven wards within the council's Caithness, Sutherland and Easter Ross corporate management area and one of 22 wards within the council area.

== See also ==
- Lord Reay
- David Reay
- Reay Parish Church
