= Bornesketaig =

Coordinates: 57.65°N 06.41°W

Bornesketaig: Scottish Gaelic: Borgh na Sgiotaig
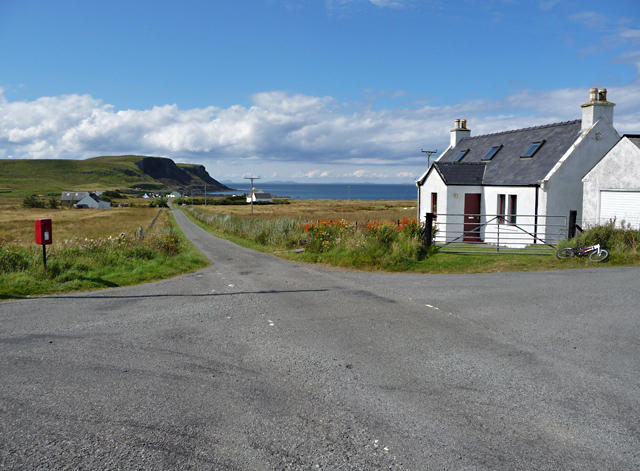

- Location within the Isle of Skye
- OS grid reference: NG3771
- Council area: Highland
- Country: Scotland
- Sovereign state: United Kingdom
- Postcode district: IV51 9
- Police: Scotland
- Fire: Scottish
- Ambulance: Scottish

Bornesketaig, Scottish Gaelic Borgh na Sgiotaig, is a dispersed crofting settlement in Trotternish on the Isle of Skye.

== Broch ==
A broch once stood nearby, but little remains as the stones have been robbed for other uses. There are a number of caves in the cliffs around Bornesketaig.

== Gallery ==
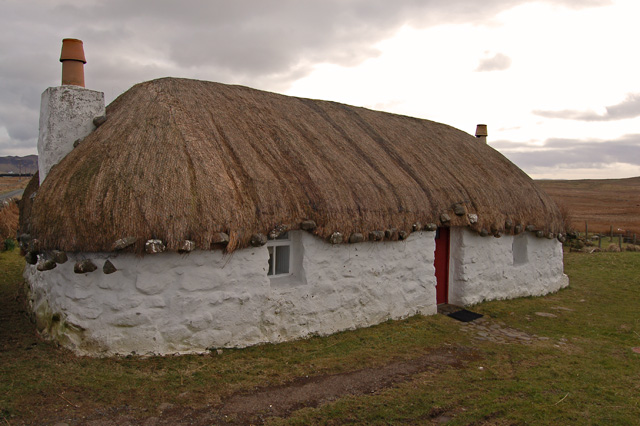
Beaton's Croft, 40 Bornesketaig, is a Category A listed building

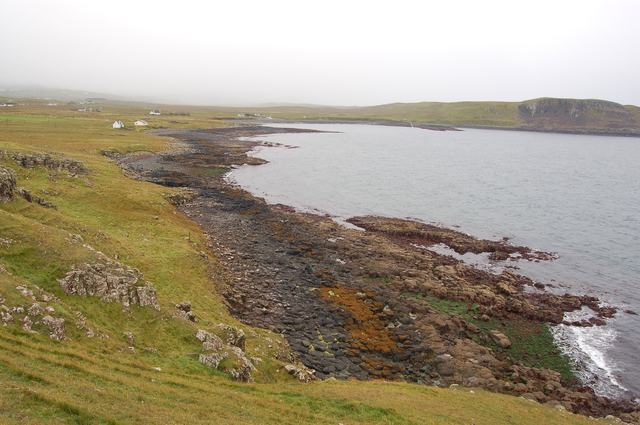
The beach of Camas Mor with some of the houses in Bornesketaig
