= Auchindrean =

Coordinates: 57.77752°N 5.0423°W

Auchindrean: Scottish Gaelic: Achadh an Dreaghainn
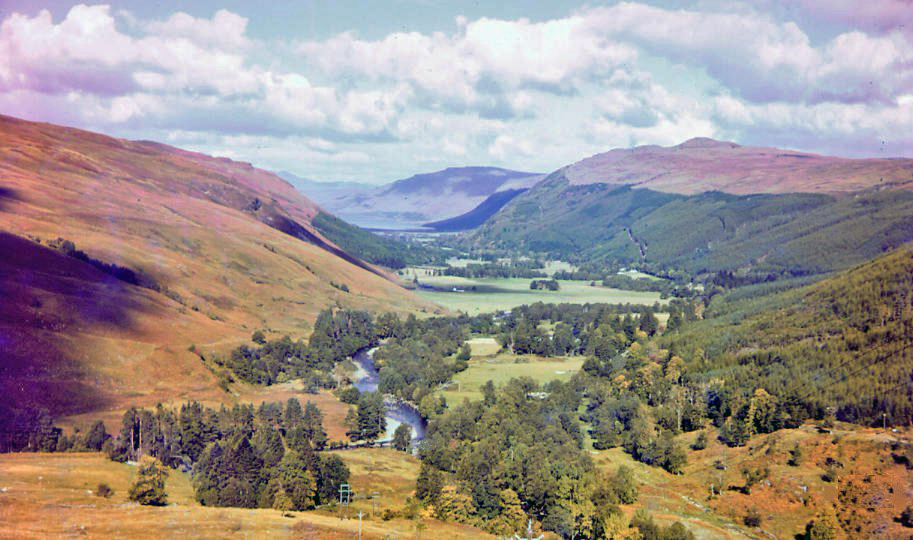
- Strath Mor towards Loch Broom and Ullapool from near Auchindrean Bridge

- Location within the Ross and Cromarty area
- OS grid reference: NH191804
- Council area: Highland
- Country: Scotland
- Sovereign state: United Kingdom
- Postcode district: IV23 2
- Police: Scotland
- Fire: Scottish
- Ambulance: Scottish
- UK Parliament: Ross, Skye and Lochaber
- Scottish Parliament: Caithness, Sutherland and Ross

Auchindrean (Scottish Gaelic: Achadh an Dreaghainn) is a small settlement close to the southern end of Loch Broom in Wester Ross, in the Highland council area of Scotland. Auchindrean is in Strath More, between Braemore and Ullapool, which lies 10 miles southeast of the village. It lies to the west of the A835 road and the River Broom.

In 1870, Auchindrean Bridge was built across the river by railway engineer Sir John Fowler, 1st Baronet, who owned the estate. This is a lenticular-truss wrought-iron bridge, said to be unique in Scotland, and is now Category A listed. It is a similar style to the Forth Bridge, designed later by Fowler.

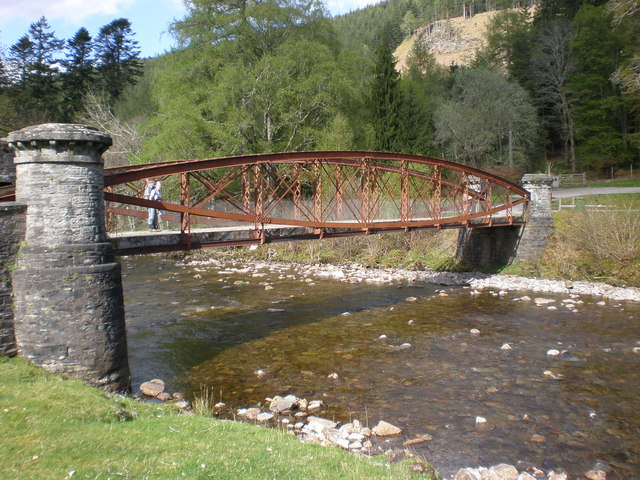
Auchindrean Bridge
