= Borrodale Viaduct =

Bridge in Highland, Scotland

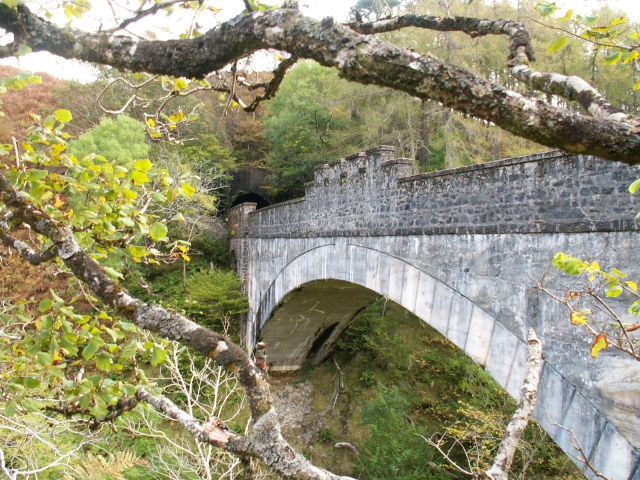
- The tunnel can be seen at the end of the viaduct
- Coordinates: 56.903384°N 5.783106°W
- Carries: West Highland Line
- Crosses: Borrodale Burn

Characteristics
- Material: Concrete
- Longest span: 127 feet 6 inches (38.86 m)
- No. of spans: 3

History
- Construction start: 1897
- Construction end: 1901

Listed Building – Category A
- Official name: Arisaig, Borrodale Railway Viaduct Over The Borrodale Burn
- Designated: 4 October 1971
- Reference no.: LB302

Location
- Interactive map of Borrodale Viaduct

The Borrodale Viaduct is a railway viaduct that carries the West Highland Line over the Borrodale Burn.

== History ==
The West Highland Railway was built to Fort William by Lucas and Aird, but there were delays with the West Highland Railway Mallaig Extension (Guarantee) bill for the Mallaig Extension Railway in the House of Commons as the Tory and Liberal parties fought over the issue of subsidies for public transport. This Act did pass in 1896, by which time Lucas and Aird (and their workers) had moved south. New contractors were needed and Robert McAlpine & Sons were taken on with Simpson & Wilson as engineers. Robert McAlpine & Sons was headed by Robert McAlpine, nicknamed "Concrete Bob" for his innovative use of mass concrete. Concrete was used due to the difficulty of working the hard schist in the area. McAlpine's son Robert, then aged 28, took charge of construction, with his younger son Malcolm appointed as assistant.

Construction of the extension from Fort William to Mallaig began in January 1897, and the line opened on 1 April 1901.

In the decade after Borrodale was constructed, a large number of other concrete bridges were put up, whereas in the five years prior there were only three.

== Design ==
The viaduct has a main span of 127 feet 6 inches (38.86 m), which at the time of its construction was the longest mass concrete span in the world. The original proposal was to have a conventional viaduct with piers in the gully, but the owner of Arisaig House insisted that the piers be clad in granite, so the design with the large span was settled on instead. The side spans are clad in dressed stone and are both of span 20 feet (6.1 m). There is also a dressed stone parapet.

The rise of the main arch is 23 feet (7.0 m), and the viaduct is 80 feet (24 m) above the Borrodale Burn. To the south-east, towards Fort William, is a tunnel almost adjacent to the viaduct.

== See also ==
- List of bridges in Scotland
