= Beaton's Cottage =

Architectural structure in Highland, Scotland

- Beaton's Croft
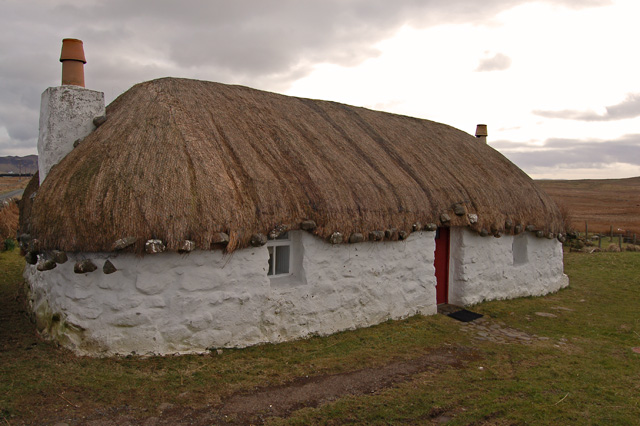
- The cottage in 2008

- Shown in Highlands
- 57.649996°N 6.396351°W
- Location: 40 Bornesketaig, Skye; Scotland

History
- Built: c. 1880; 146 years ago

Listed Building – Category A
- Designated: 5 October 1971
- Reference no.: LB7240

Beaton's Cottage (also known as Beaton's Croft) is a croft dwelling in Bornesketaig, Isle of Skye, Scotland, near the island's northern tip. A Category A listed, it was built around 1880 and is in "quite excellent condition". It is a single-storey construction, three bays with centre door, of whitewashed rubble with rounded corners. It has small four-pane windows, with one similar window in the rear, gable-end chimney stacks and a piended thatched roof. A single-storey byre of same build is lit by two skylights.

== Gallery ==
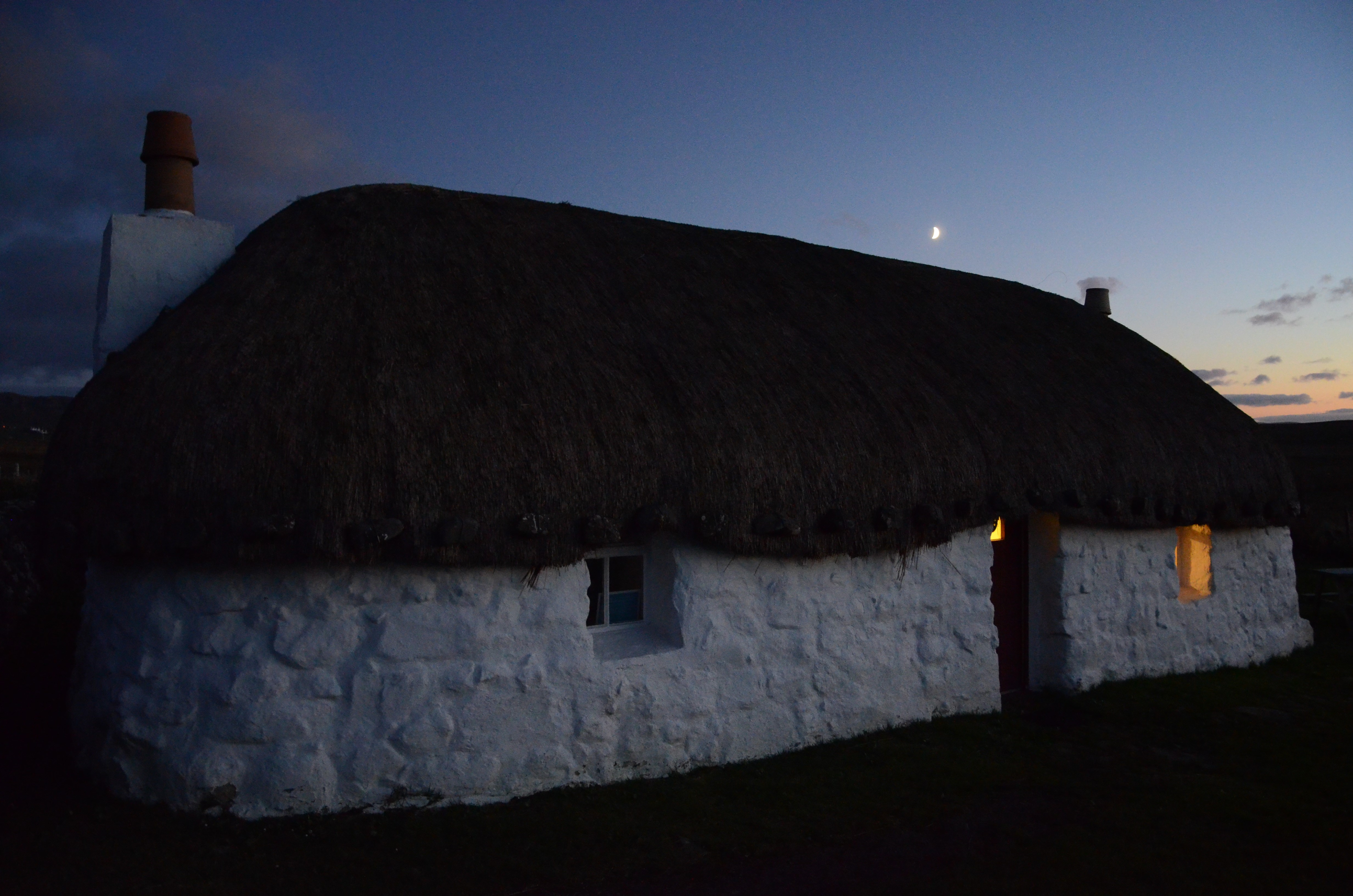
Night view

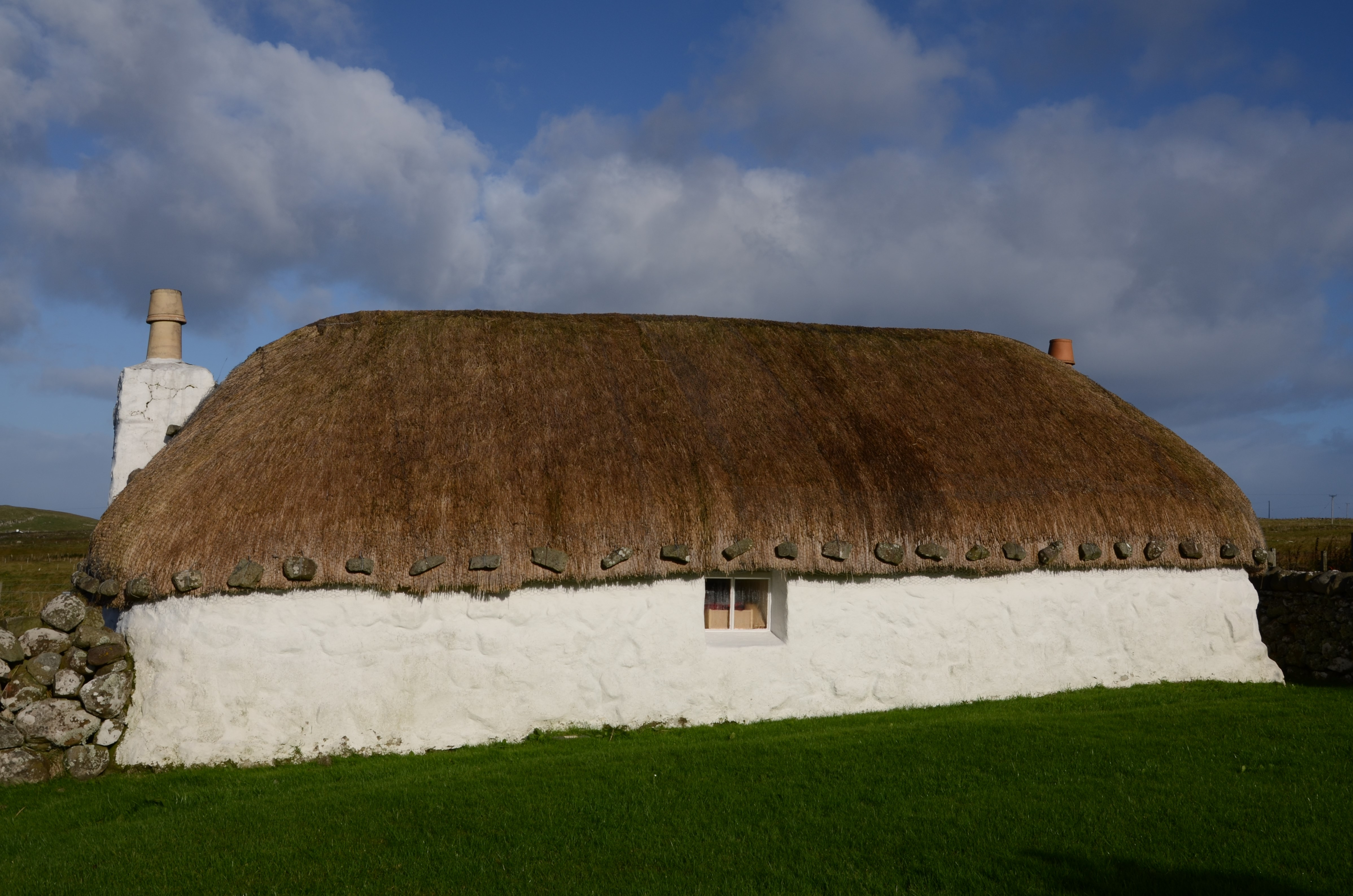
Rear view

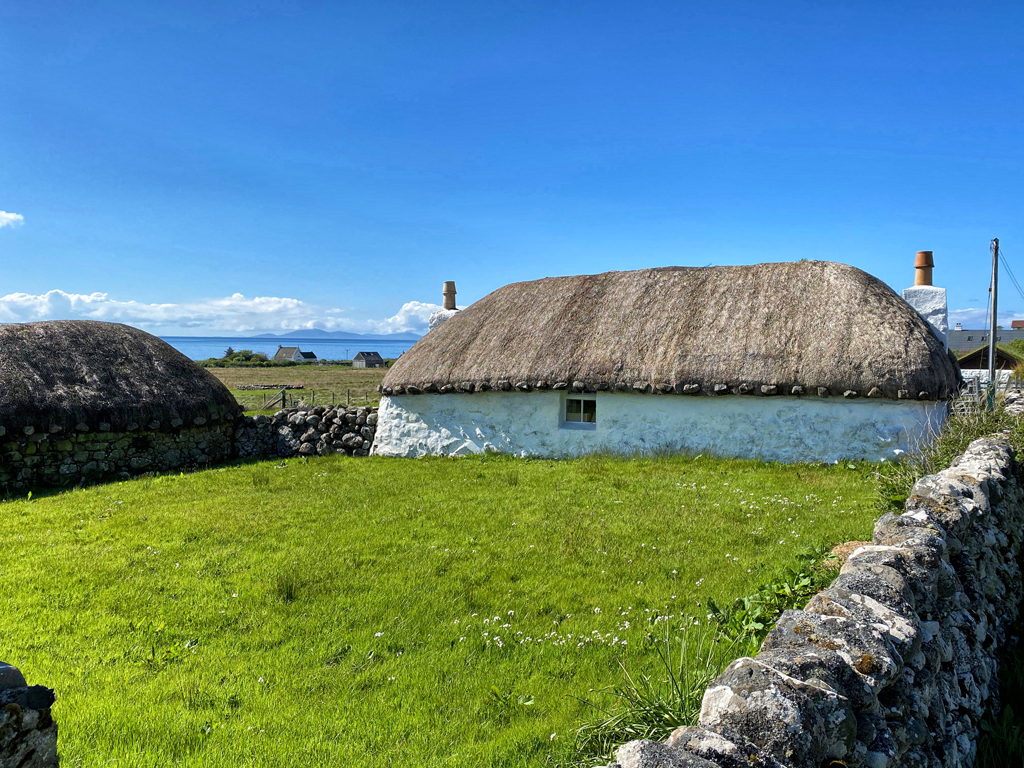
Attached byre

== See also ==
- List of listed buildings in Highland
