= Tornagrain =

Hamlet in the Scottish Highlands

Coordinates: 57.52635°N 4.03636°W

Tornagrain: Scottish Gaelic: Tòrr na Grèine
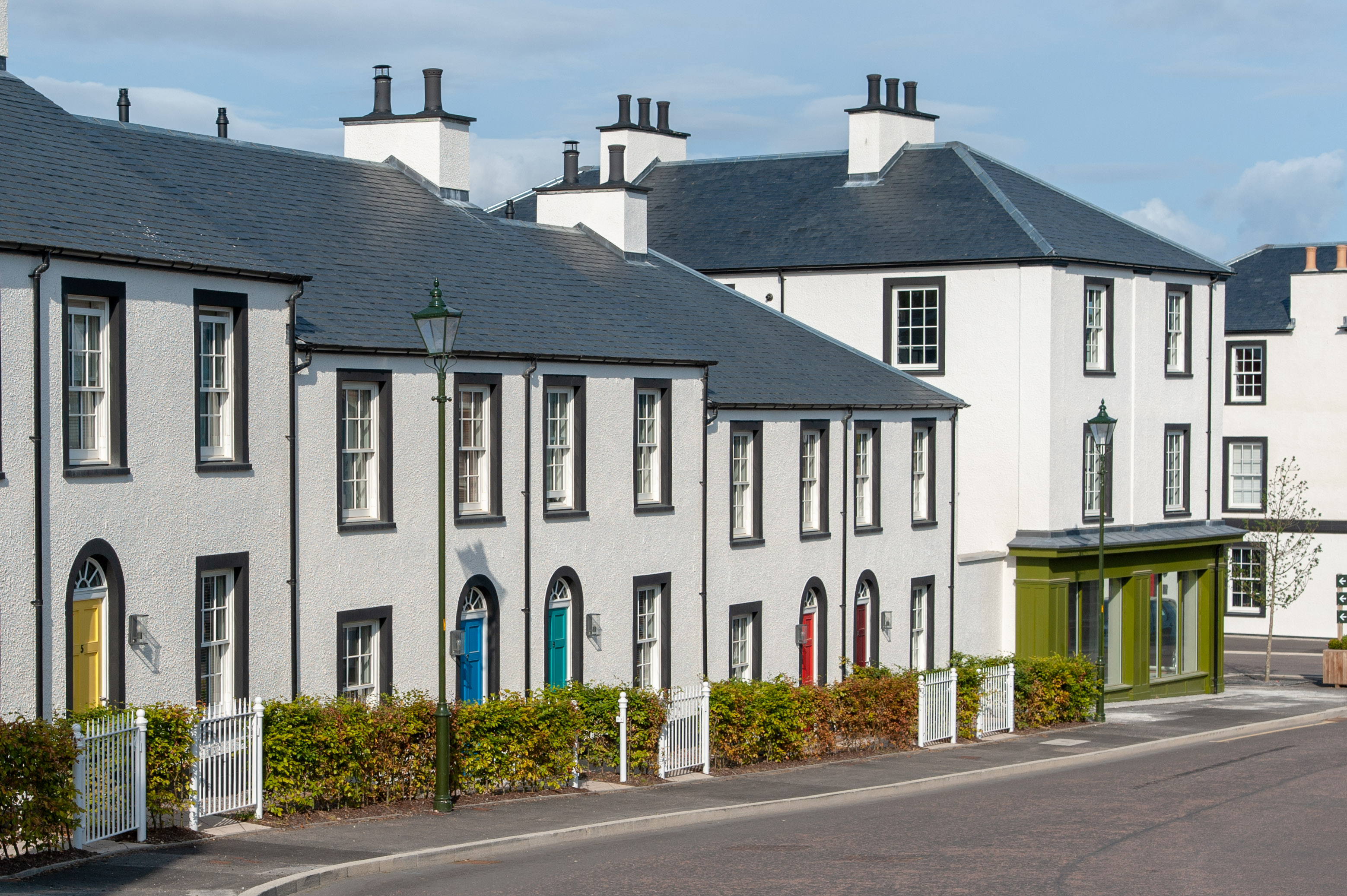
- Housing in Phase 1a

- Location within the Inverness area
- OS grid reference: NH781502
- Council area: Highland
- Country: Scotland
- Sovereign state: United Kingdom
- Post town: Inverness
- Postcode district: IV2 8
- Police: Scotland
- Fire: Scottish
- Ambulance: Scottish
- UK Parliament: Moray West, Nairn and Strathspey

Tornagrain (from the Scottish Gaelic Tòrr na Grèine meaning 'The Sunny Mound') is a hamlet and planned village in the Scottish Highlands, situated around 7 miles (11 km) northeast of Inverness. It falls within the Highland council area for local government purposes. Tornagrain lies 1 mile (2 km) southeast of Inverness Airport, and 2 miles (3 km) east of Castle Stuart.

In 2009, the Moray Estate submitted designs to planning authorities for a new community of more than 10,000 residents near the old hamlet of Tornagrain. Planning permission was granted for the building of 5,000 homes in September 2012. Developers claim Tornagrain is the first new town to be built in Scotland for more than 50 years.

Moray Estates began building on the site in 2018, and is planning to continue until at least 2060. The 250th home was built in 2022, and a number of small businesses such as a supermarket, café, and pharmacy had taken up residency. However, concerns were raised around the provision of other key services, with a local primary school not opening until at least 2030.

== Transportation ==
The hamlet is served by bus. In 2023, Inverness Airport railway station was completed, which lies less than 1 mile (2 km) northwest of Tornagrain.
