= River Dulnain =

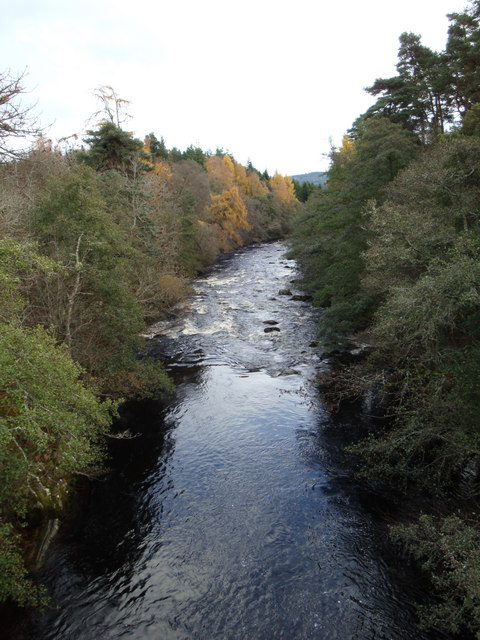
River Dulnain shortly before it joins the Spey, taken from the bridge in Dulnain Bridge

The River Dulnain (Gaelic: Tuilnean / Abhainn Tuilnein) is a major left bank tributary of the River Spey in northeast Scotland. It rises in the eastern part of the Monadhliath Mountains (57.1516°N 4.1288°W) and flows in a generally northeastward direction through uninhabited country to Sluggan, where it is crossed by Sluggan Bridge, constructed by General Wade to carry a military road. (The route now forms a part of Route 7 of the National Cycle Network.) Turning more easterly, the Dulnain passes beneath the modern A9 road which bypasses Carrbridge, the mainline railway and, in Carrbridge itself, the Carrbridge Packhorse Bridge that gives the village its name and the bridge carrying the B9153 road (former A9). The final section flowing east-northeast to the village of Dulnain Bridge is accompanied by the A938 road. The river empties into the Spey (57.2936°N 3.6538°W) after passing beneath the A95 road and the disused bridge of the former Strathspey railway.

== Etymology ==
The name derives from the Scottish Gaelic tuil which means flood and ean which means stream and is perhaps descriptive of its reaction to rainfall.
