= Gairlochy =

Coordinates: 56.913°N 4.998°W

Gairlochy: Scottish Gaelic: Geàrr Lòchaidh
- Location within the Lochaber area
- Population: 100
- Language: English, Scottish Gaelic
- OS grid reference: NN1752084268
- Council area: Highland
- Lieutenancy area: Inverness
- Country: Scotland
- Sovereign state: United Kingdom
- Post town: Fort William
- Postcode district: PH34 4
- Dialling code: 01397 712
- Police: Scotland
- Fire: Scottish
- Ambulance: Scottish
- UK Parliament: Ross, Skye and Lochaber
- Scottish Parliament: Inverness East, Nairn and Lochaber

Gairlochy (Scottish Gaelic: Geàrr Lòchaidh) is a clachan, or hamlet, of population approx. 100. It lies on the southern shores of Loch Lochy, a large freshwater loch in the district of Lochaber in the North West Highlands of Scotland. Gairlochy is surrounded by several other small crofting settlements, the largest of which is Achnacarry. Also close by is Highbridge, the site of the first skirmish of the 1745 Jacobite uprising.

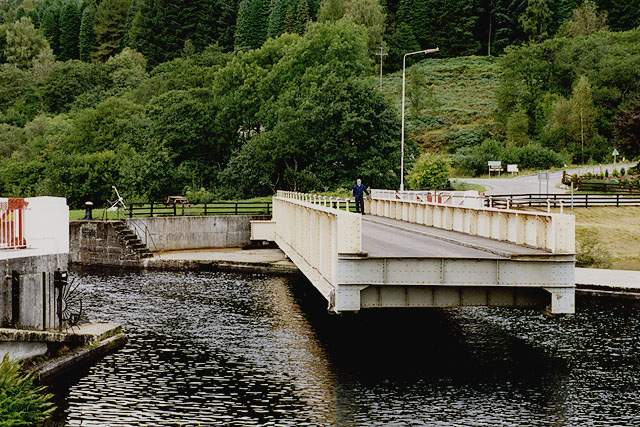
The Gairlochy swing bridge opening

Between 1803 and 1822, the Caledonian Canal was built, passing through Gairlochy, over the original site of the River Lochy. Two locks were built for access onto Loch Lochy, but only one, the Upper Lock, is still in use. At the lower lock an end pivoted swingbridge and lock keepers' house is provided to carry the B8005 road and Great Glen Way over the canal.

Completed in 1896, the Invergarry and Fort Augustus Railway passed through the clachan, with a small island-platform station, called Gairlochy Station, in nearby Mucomir, the current site of a caravan park and Mucomir hydro-electric power station.
