= Sluggan Bridge =

Bridge in Highlands, Scotland

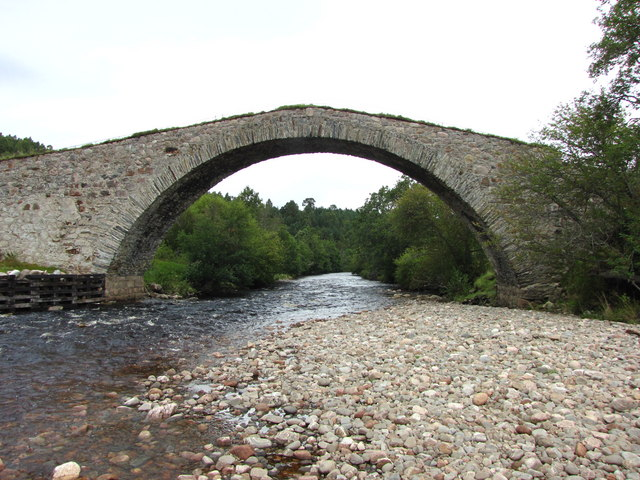
- Bridge crossing the River Dulnain
- Coordinates: 57.2747°N 3.8758°W
- Crosses: River Dulnain

Characteristics
- Material: Stone
- Longest span: 17.8 metres (58 ft)

Listed Building – Category A
- Official name: Sluggan Bridge Over River Dulnain
- Designated: 4 October 1971
- Reference no.: LB240

Location
- Interactive map of Sluggan Bridge

Sluggan Bridge is a historic bridge spanning the River Dulnain in Scotland.

== History ==
The present bridge replaces a two-arched bridge of 32 feet (9.8 m) span built by George Wade as part of a military road. The old bridge was washed away in the floods of 1829, and the present one put up some time after.

== Design ==
It has a single arch of 17.8 metres (58 ft) span, and rises high above the flat ground around it. It is about 4.3 metres (14 ft) wide, with metal railings instead of parapets. Despite being more modern than many other stone bridges, Sluggan bridge is of a more old-fashioned construction.

== See also ==
- List of bridges in Scotland
