= Culloden Viaduct =

Railway bridge in Highland, Scotland

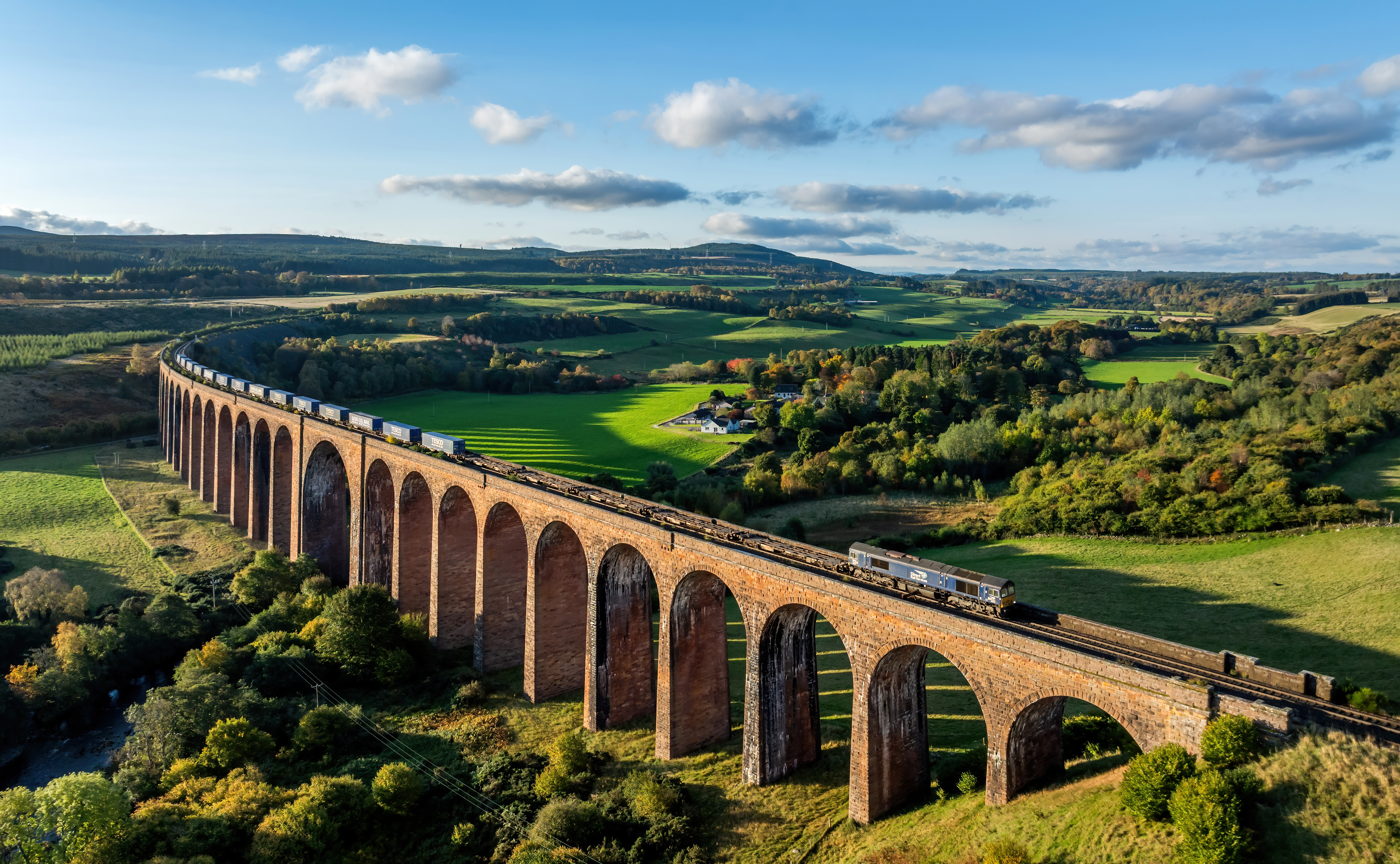
- Train crossing the viaduct
- Coordinates: 57.4780°N 4.0627°W
- OS grid reference: NH 76413 44972
- Carries: Highland Main Line
- Crosses: River Nairn
- Locale: Highland
- Other names: Nairn Viaduct; Culloden Moor Viaduct; Clava Viaduct

Characteristics
- Design: Arch
- Material: Stone
- Total length: 550 metres (1,800 ft)
- No. of spans: 29

History
- Designer: Murdoch Paterson
- Opened: 1898

Listed Building – Category A
- Official name: Clava, Nairn Viaduct Over The Nairn River, Otherwise Known As Culloden Moor Viaduct
- Designated: 5 October 1971
- Reference no.: LB1709

Location
- Interactive map of Culloden Viaduct

The Culloden Viaduct (known variously as the Nairn Viaduct, Culloden Moor Viaduct, or Clava Viaduct) is the longest masonry railway viaduct in Scotland. It carries the Highland Main Line, to the east of the city of Inverness, in the Highland council area of Scotland.

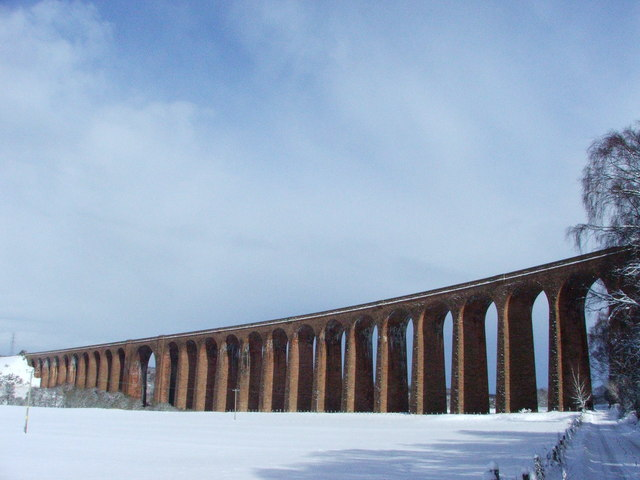
Culloden Viaduct in winter

== Design ==
Culloden Viaduct has 29 arches, making it the longest masonry viaduct in Scotland. It crosses the River Nairn and its valley. It is built from rubble and dressed with red-faced ashlar. The arch rings have tooled ashlar details. The arches are all semi-circular with a 50-foot (15-metre) span except for the one crossing the river (between the 10th and 11th piers from the north) which has a span of 100 feet (30 metres). The total length of the viaduct is around 1,800 feet (550 metres). It curves at the south end to align with the hillside.

== History ==
The viaduct was designed by Murdoch Paterson, the Highland Railway's chief engineer. It opened in 1898 as part of the Inverness and Aviemore Direct Railway, which was built by the Highland Railway and is now part of the Highland Main Line. The railway previously took a more circuitous route via Forres. It was one of the last major railway engineering works in Scotland.

Culloden Moor railway station was situated at the northern end of the viaduct, but the station was closed in the 1960s. Paterson died there in 1897, before the viaduct was complete. It was his last engineering project.

The viaduct is a Category A listed building, a status which grants it legal protection, It was first listed on 5 October 1971. It is just east of the site of the Battle of Culloden (1746).

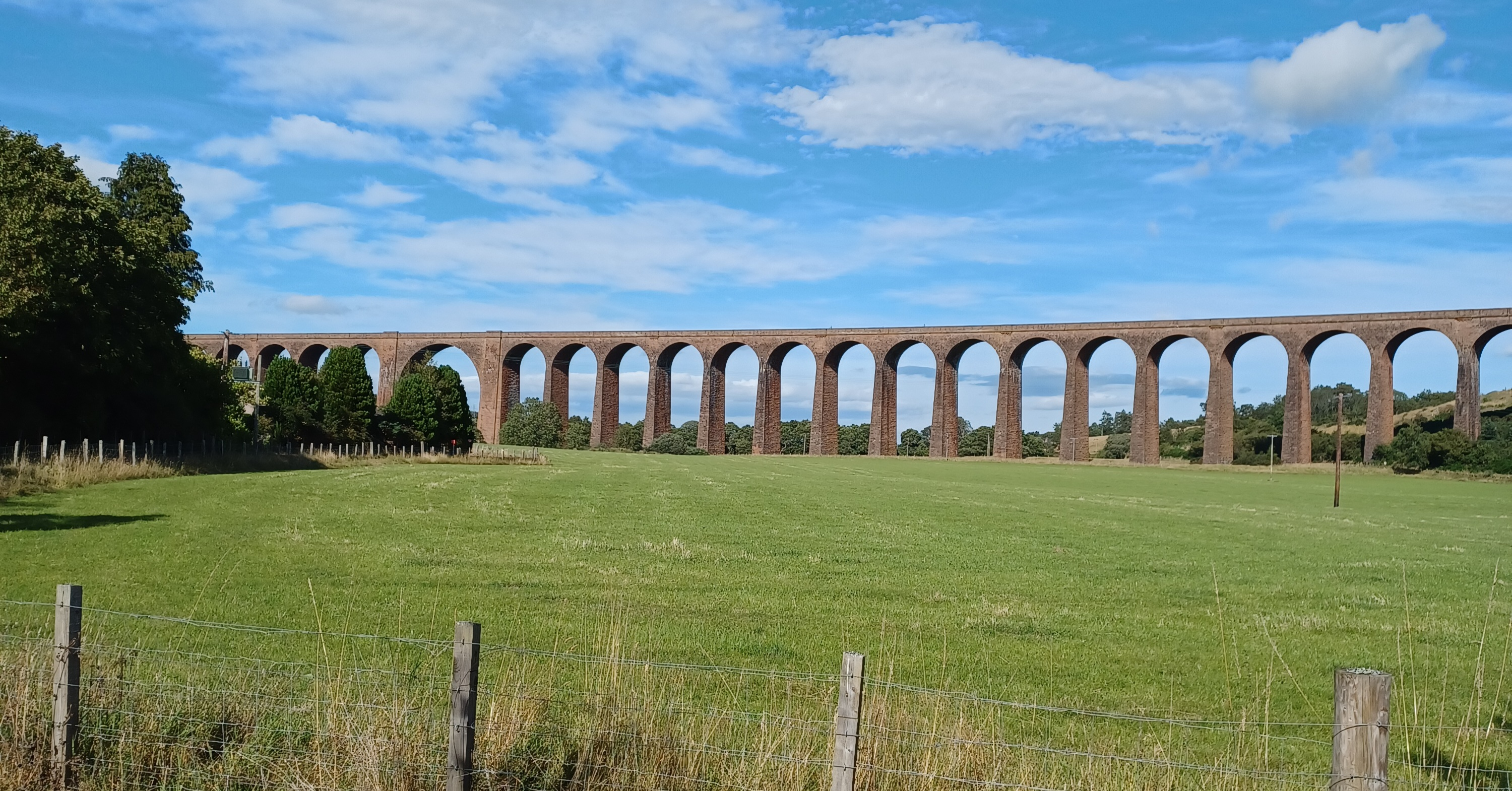
The viaduct in 2022.

== See also ==
- The Balnuaran of Clava cairns lie just to the west of the viaduct
- List of bridges in Scotland
