= Broomhill Bridge =

Bridge in Highland, Scotland

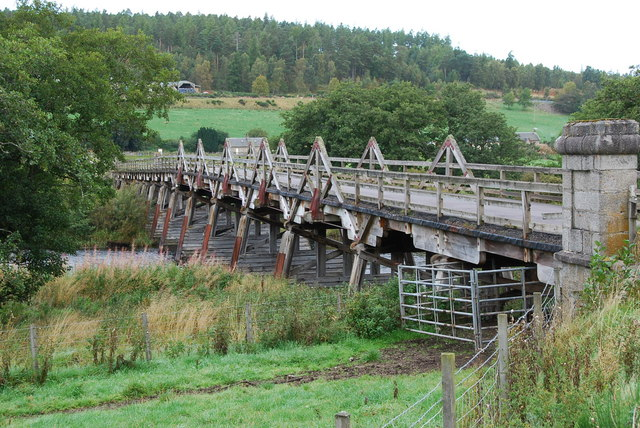
- Bridge crossing the River Spey
- Coordinates: 57.280754°N 3.665426°W
- Crosses: River Spey

Characteristics
- Material: Wood
- No. of spans: 15

History
- Designer: John Mackenzie
- Construction end: 1894

Listed Building – Category A
- Official name: Broomhill Bridge Over River Spey
- Designated: 4 October 1971
- Reference no.: LB260

Location
- Interactive map of Broomhill Bridge

The Broomhill Bridge is a wooden bridge over the River Spey.

== History ==
It was built by engineer John Mackenzie and contractor Charles Mackay, to replace a bridge that had been washed away.

A plaque on the bridge states that the bridge was erected by the "Third, or Badenoch, District Committee of the Inverness-shire County Council," and that the last nail was driven by the Countess Dowager of Seafield on 27 November 1894.

The bridge had to be partially rebuilt in 1987, when some trusses were replaced. The Broomhill Bridge is of the same design as a bridge opened in 1899 at Boat of Garten, but this bridge has since been replaced.

== Design ==
The bridge has 15 wooden spans supported by trestle piers, and the five spans in the main river channel have triangular reinforcing trusses. Each trestle consists of five posts, one vertical and two to each side of it at an angle. Up to half-way up the pier it is reinforced by solid horizontal planking, and above that by diagonal beams on each side of the pier. The five beams which support the roadway sit on a round-ended beam on top of each pier. The abutments are granite, and the piers have metal plates on their upstream faces to protect against debris.

It carries an unclassified public road known as Station Road.

== See also ==
- List of bridges in Scotland
