= Muirshearlich =

Coordinates: 56.878°N 5.056°W

Muirshearlich: Scottish Gaelic: Muir Sìorlaich
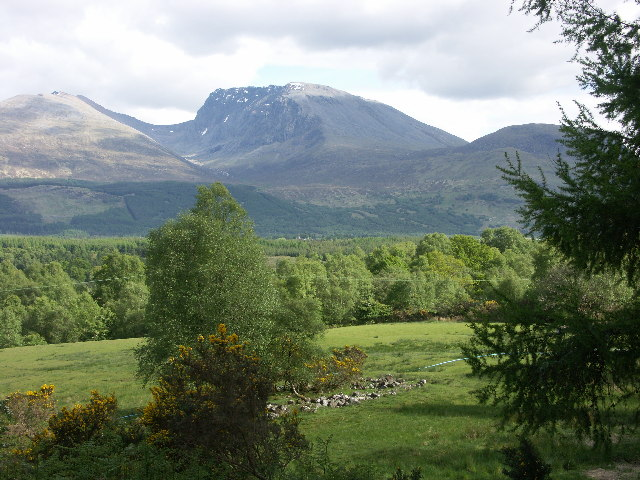
- Ben Nevis from Muirshearlich.

- Location within the Lochaber area
- OS grid reference: NN138804
- Council area: Highland
- Country: Scotland
- Sovereign state: United Kingdom
- Post town: Fort William
- Postcode district: PH33 7
- Police: Scotland
- Fire: Scottish
- Ambulance: Scottish

Muirshearlich (Scottish Gaelic: Muir Sìorlaich) is a small hamlet, 4 miles (6.4 km) northeast of Fort William, along the B8004 road, in Lochaber, Scottish Highlands and is in the council area of Highland.
