= List of churches in Highland (council area) =

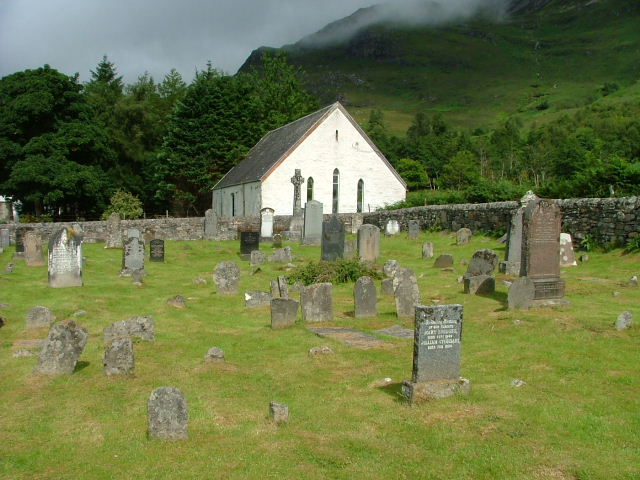
Arnisdale Free Church

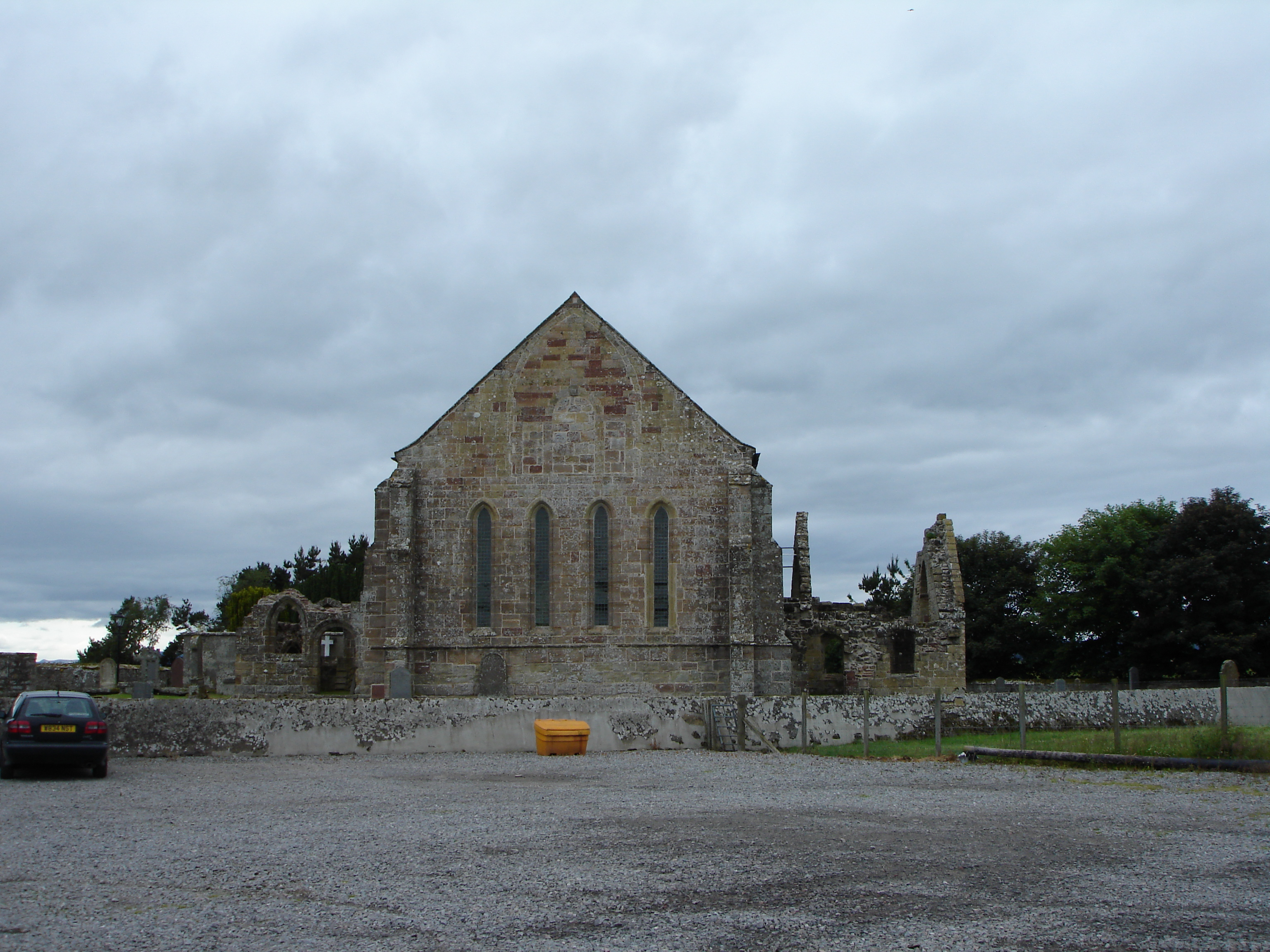
Fearn Abbey

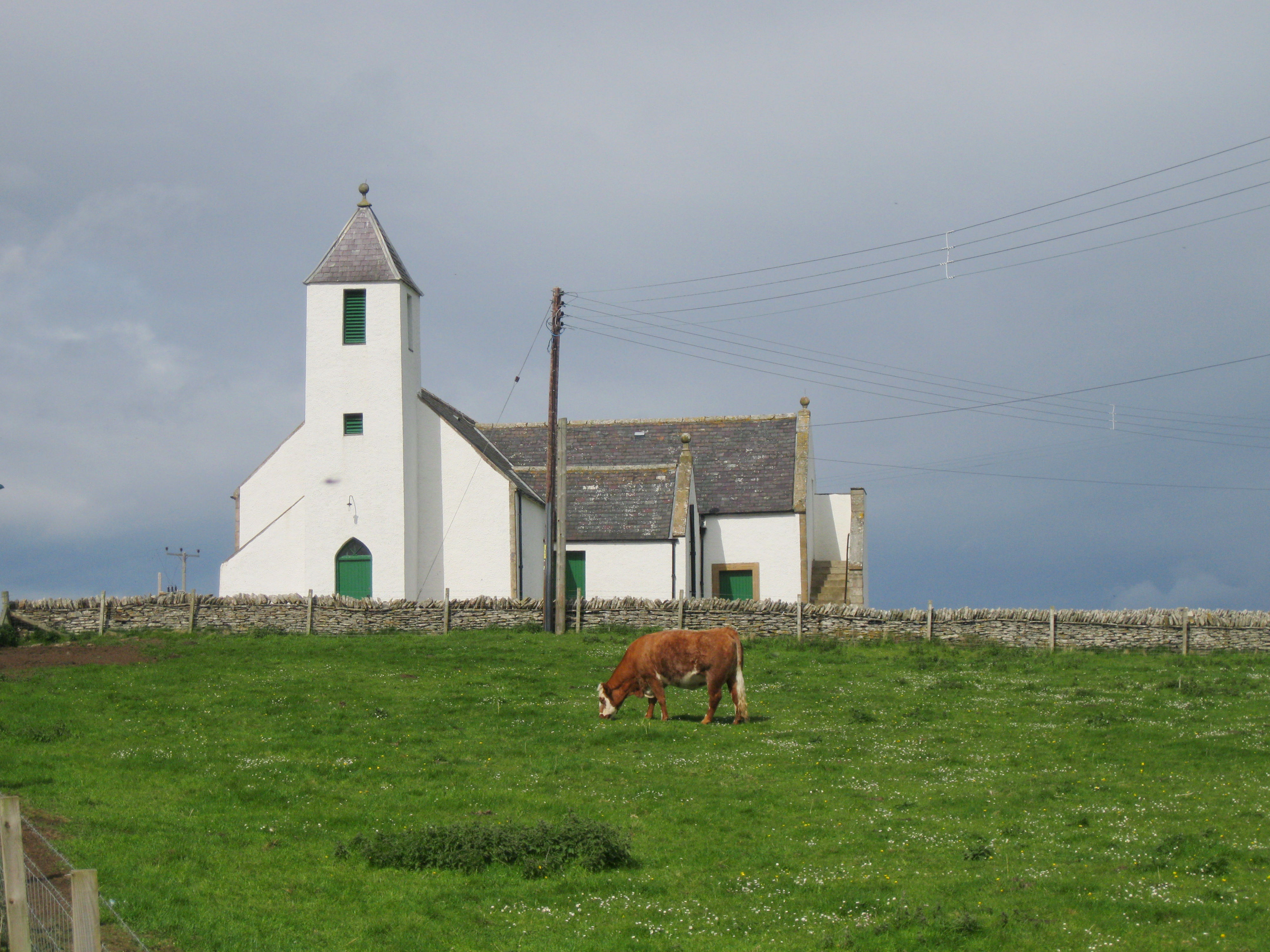
Reay Parish Church

A List of churches in Highland (council area), Scotland.

The area was previously divided into civil parishes, one for each medieval church:

- Caithness: Bower, Canisbay, Dunnet, Halkirk, Latheron, Olrig, Reay (partly in Sutherland until 1891), Thurso, Watten, and Wick.
- Sutherland: Assynt, Clyne, Creich, Dornoch, Durness, Eddrachillis, Farr, Golspie, Kildonan, Lairg, Lothbeg, Rogart, and Tongue.
- Inverness-shire: Abernethy and Kincardine (partly in Morayshire until 1891), Alvie, Ardersier, Arisaig and Moidart, Boleskine and Abertarff, Bracadale, Croy & Dalcross, Daviot & Dunlichity, Petty (all three partly in Nairnshire until 1891), Dores, Duirinish, Duthil & Rothiemurchus (partly in Morayshire until 1870), Glenelg, Inverness and Bona, Kilmallie, Small Isles (both partly in Argyllshire until 1891), Kilmonivaig, Kilmorack (partly in Ross and Cromarty until 1891), Kingussie & Insh, Kirkhill, Laggan, Moy & Dalarossie, Portree, Sleat, Snizort, Strath, and Urquhart & Glenmoriston.
- Ross and Cromarty: Alness, Applecross, Avoch, Contin, Cromarty, Dingwall, Edderton, Fearn, Fodderty, Gairloch, Glenshiel, Killearnan, Kincardine, Kintail, Knockbain, Lochalsh, Lochbroom, Lochcarron, Logie Easter, Nigg, Resolis, Rosemarkie, Rosskeen, Tain, Tarbat, Urquhart & Logie Wester (partly in Nairnshire until 1891), and Urray (partly in Inverness-shire until 1891).
- Nairnshire: Ardclach, Auldearn, Cawdor (partly in Inverness-shire until 1891) and Nairn.
- Morayshire: Cromdale, Inverallan & Advie (partly in Inverness-shire until 1891), and Edinkillie (now partially in Moray).
- Argyllshire: Ardchattan and Muckairn, Glen Orchy and Inishail, Lismore and Appin (all three now partially in Argyll & Bute), Ardgour, Ardnamurchan, and Morvern.

== List of churches ==
Name	Civil parish (settlement)	Web	Founded	Denomination	Notes
	Abernethy & Kincardine				
Alness Parish Church	Alness				
Alness Baptist Church	Alness	www.alnessbc.org.uk	1979	Baptist Union Of Scotland	
	Alvie				
Clachan Church	Applecross				
	Ardchattan & Muckairn				
	Ardclach				
	Ardersier				
	Ardgour				
	Ardnamurchan				
Arisaig Parish Church	Arisaig & Moidart				
	Assynt				
	Auldearn				
	Avoch				
Immaculate Conception, Stratherrick	Boleskine & Abertarff (Stratherrick)		1859	Roman Catholic	Ded. Immaculate Conception
Church of the Holy Rood	Bower				
	Bracadale				
Canisbay Parish Church	Canisbay		1600s	Church of Scotland	Rebuilt C17th
	Cawdor				
	Clyne				
	Contin				
	Creich				
	Cromarty				
	Cromdale				
	Croy & Dalcross				
	Daviot & Dunlichity				
Fresh Springs	Dingwall			Baptist Union Of Scotland	Meeting with/at Killearnan Parish Church 10.15 Sundays
	Dores				
Dornoch Cathedral	Dornoch		Medieval	Church of Scotland	Burned down 1570, repaired 1835-37
Dunvegan Parish Church	Duirinish			Church of Scotland	
Dunnet Parish Church	Dunnet		Medieval	Church of Scotland	
Scarfskerry Baptist Church	Dunnet (Scarfskerry)			Baptist Union Of Scotland	
Balnakeil Church	Durness				
	Duthil & Rothiemurchus				
	Edderton				
	Eddrachillis				
	Edinkillie				
	Farr				
Fearn Abbey	Fearn		Medieval	Church of Scotland	Originally an abbey; later became a parish church
Hilton of Cadboll Chapel	Fearn (Hilton of Cadboll)				
	Fodderty				
	Gairloch				
	Glen Orchy & Inishail				
Arnisdale Free Church	Glenelg (Arnisdale)			Free Church (Cont)	
	Glenshiel				
	Golspie				
Halkirk & Westerdale Parish Church	Halkirk		1886	Church of Scotland	Originally Free Church and UFC
	Inverallan & Advie				
Barn Church	Inverness & Bona			Church of Scotland	Parish church 1980s. Mission from East Church
Celt Street Evangelical Church	Inverness & Bona			Independent	
Crown Church	Inverness & Bona		1897	Church of Scotland	Originally Free Church and UFC
Dalneigh Church	Inverness & Bona			Church of Scotland	
East Church	Inverness & Bona		1798	Church of Scotland	Initially chapel of ease. Rebuilt 1852-53. For a time Free Church and UFC
Free North Church	Inverness & Bona			Free Church	
Free Presbyterian Church	Inverness & Bona			Free Presbyterian	
Greyfriars Free Church	Inverness & Bona			Free Church	
Hilton Church	Inverness & Bona			Church of Scotland	
Inshes Church	Inverness & Bona			Church of Scotland	
Inverness Baptist Church	Inverness & Bona			Baptist Union Of Scotland	
Inverness Cathedral (St Andrew's)	Inverness & Bona		1866-1869	Episcopal Church	Ded. St Andrew. First new Great Britain Protestant cathedral since the Reformation.
Inverness Church of God	Inverness & Bona			Church of God	
Inverness Methodist Church	Inverness & Bona				
Inverness Reformed Baptist Church	Inverness & Bona			Reformed Baptist	
Junction Church Inverness	Inverness & Bona		2003	International Network of Churches	Junction Church Inverness occupies the former St Columba High Church building.
Kinmylies Church	Inverness & Bona			Church of Scotland	
Madras Street Mission	Inverness & Bona			Free Church	
Ness Bank Church	Inverness & Bona			Church of Scotland	
Old High St Stephen's	Inverness & Bona		Medieval	Church of Scotland	Uses two buildings. 2003 union of Old High (ancient) and St Stephen's (1897)
St John the Evangelist	Inverness & Bona			Episcopal Church	
St Mary's Catholic Church	Inverness & Bona			Roman Catholic	
St Michael and All Angels	Inverness & Bona			Episcopal Church	
St Ninian's Catholic Church	Inverness & Bona			Roman Catholic	
Trinity Church	Inverness & Bona			Church of Scotland	
	Kildonan				
	Killearnan				
St Bride’s Church, Onich	Kilmallie (Onich)		1874	Church of Scotland	Ded. St Brigid
Cille Choirill	Kilmonivaig			Roman Catholic	Ded. St Kerrill. Dates from C15th, repaired 1933. Used once/month during summer
	Kilmorack				
	Kingussie & Insh				
	Kintail				
	Kirkhill				
	Knockbain				
Laggan Parish Church	Laggan				
	Lairg				
	Latheron				
	Lismore & Appin				
	Lochalsh				
Lochbroom Free Church	Lochbroom (Ullapool)		1909	Free Church	
	Lochcarron				
	Logie Easter				
	Lothbeg				
	Morvern				
	Moy & Dalarossie				
Nairn Old Parish Church	Nairn				
	Nigg				
	Olrig				
	Petty				
North Coast Parish Church	Reay and Farr (Strathy)		1739	Church of Scotland	2 buildings; 2006 union of Reay Parish Church and Strathy & Halladale CoS (1911)
	Resolis				
	Rogart				
	Rosskeen				
	Portree				
	Sleat				
St Columba's Church, Canna	Small Isles (Canna)		1912-1914	Church of Scotland	Ded. St Columba. All but defunct since only 20 islanders and most are Catholic
Snizort Free Church	Snizort (Uig)			Free Church (Cont)	Building 1860-1861
Strath & Sleat Church of Scotland	Strath (Broadford) and Sleat				4 buildings hold regular services: Broadford (1841), Elgol, Kilmore (1876), Kyleakin
	Tain				
	Tarbat				
St Peter's and St Andrew's Church	Thurso		1830-1832	Church of Scotland	Ded. SS Andrew & Peter
Thurso West Church	Thurso		1859	Church of Scotland	Originally Free Church & UFC. Congregation was Original Secession
Thurso Baptist Church	Thurso			Baptist Union Of Scotland	
St Mary's Chapel, Crosskirk	Thurso (Crosskirk)				
	Tongue				
	Urquhart & Glenmoriston				
	Urquhart & Logie Wester				
	Urray				
	Watten				
Pulteneytown Parish Church	Wick		1842	Church of Scotland	United with Thrumster 1968. United with (now disused) Wick Central
Wick Baptist Church	Wick			Baptist Union Of Scotland	

- Croick Church, Strath Carron, Sutherland

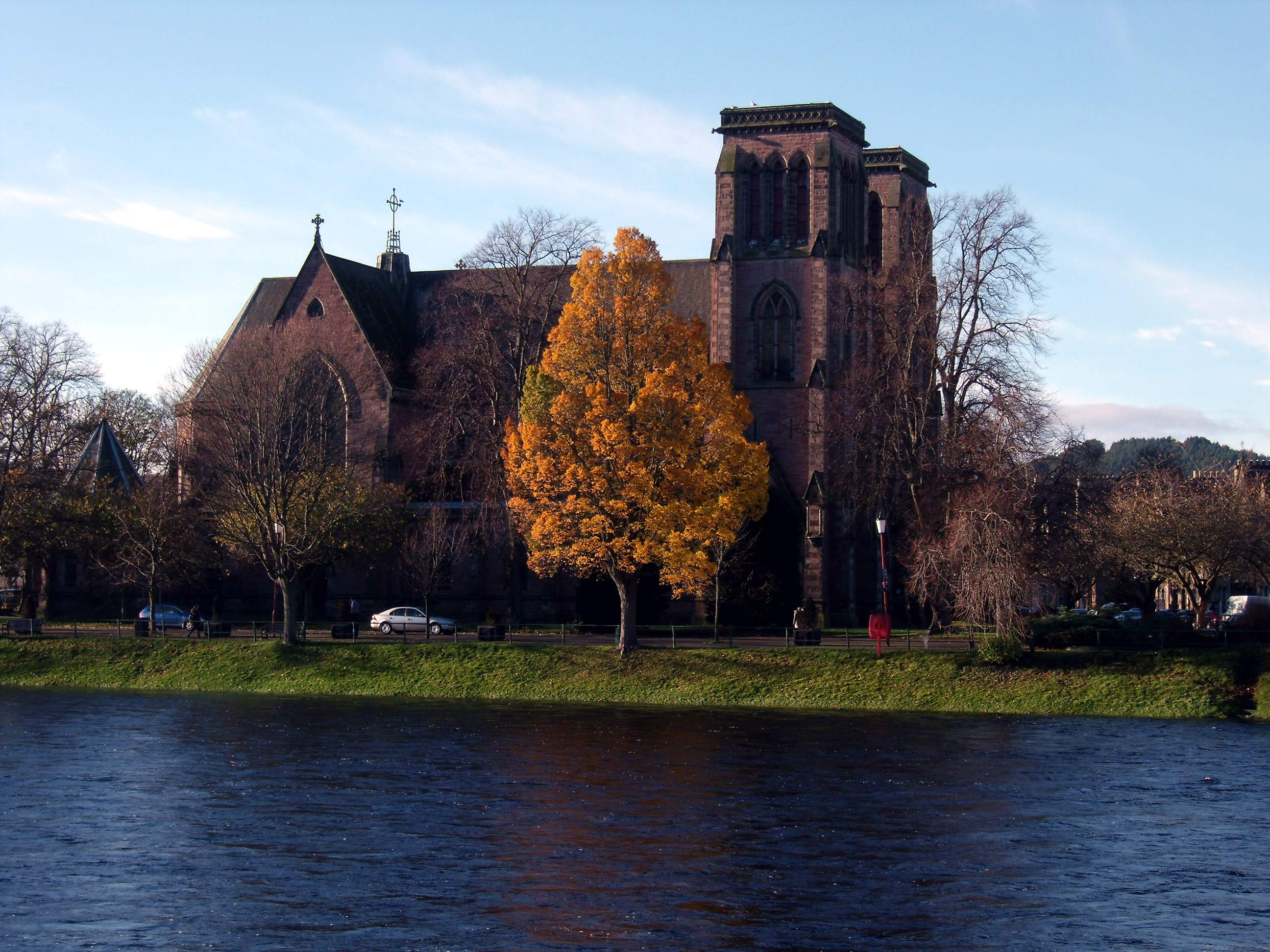
Inverness Cathedral

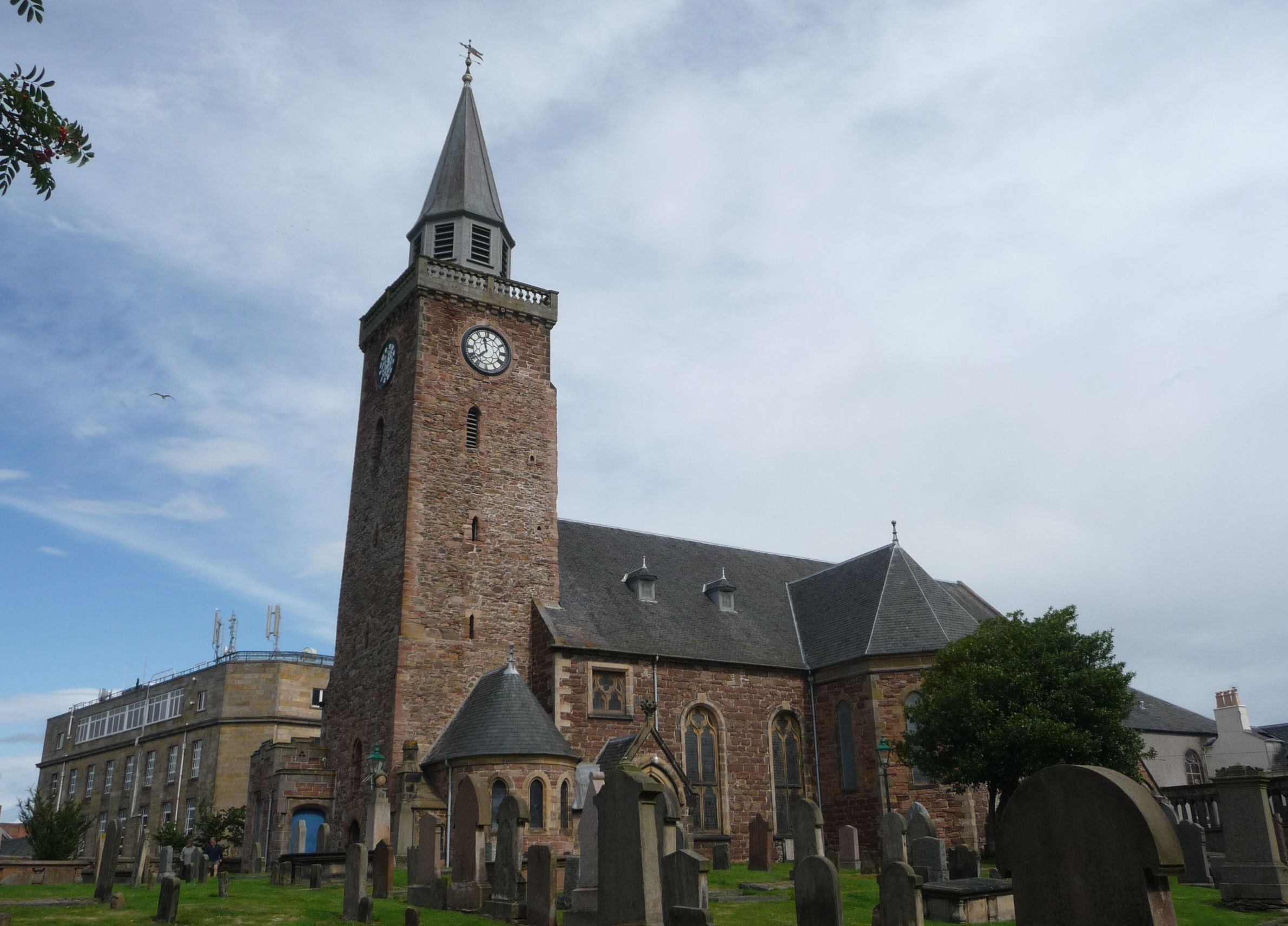
Old High Church

== Defunct churches ==
Name	Parish (settlement)	Founded	Closed	Denomination	Notes
Halkirk Auld Kirk	Halkirk	pre-1750	1934	Church of Scotland	Initially a chapel; built as church 1753. Now ruined
Berriedale Church	Latheron (Berriedale)	1826	2008	Church of Scotland	
Fortrose Cathedral	Rosemarkie (Fortrose)	Medieval	C16th-17th	Church of Scotland	Original cathedral of Ross Diocese. Ded. St Peter.
Sleat Old Parish Church	Sleat (Kilmore)	1631	1876	Church of Scotland	Ruined. Replaced by new building also in Kilmore (see above)
Cill Chriosd	Strath (Strathaird)	Medieval	1840	Church of Scotland	Rebuilt C16th. Abandoned when parish church moved to Broadford
Old St Peter's Church	Thurso	Medieval	1832	Church of Scotland	Ded. St Peter. Replaced by St Andrew & St Peter's; now ruined
United Presbyterian Church	Thurso	1767	c. 1900	United Presbyterian	Building 1777, rebuilt 1801
Pulteneytown Central Church	Wick	1806	1980s	Church of Scotland	Previously Free Church & UFC. Building now used by Wick Baptist

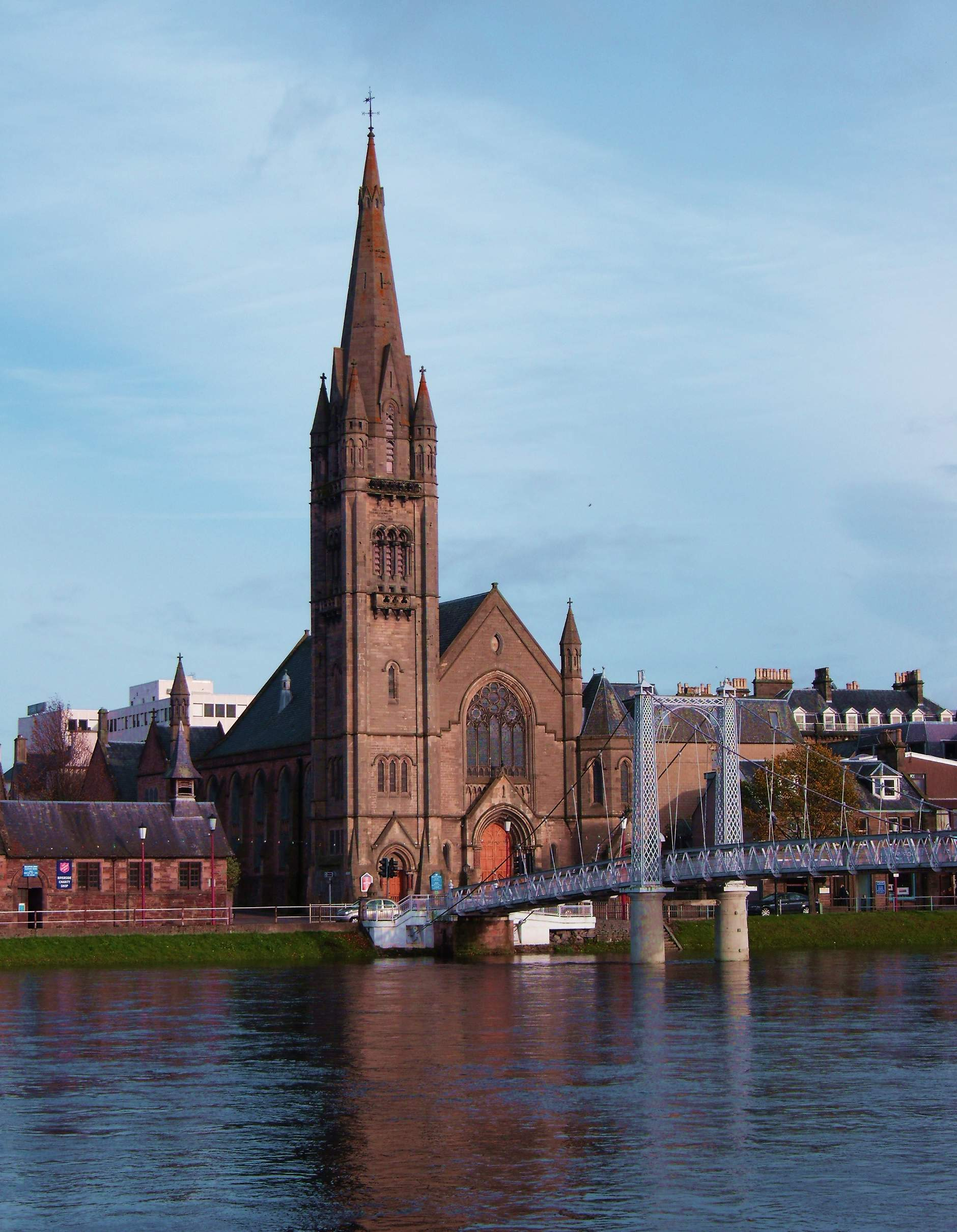
Free North Church
