= List of churches in Scotland =

A List of churches in Scotland by council area:

- Aberdeen
- Aberdeenshire
- Angus
- Argyll and Bute
- Clackmannanshire
- Dumfries and Galloway
- Dundee
- East Ayrshire
- East Dunbartonshire
- East Lothian
- East Renfrewshire
- Edinburgh
- Falkirk
- Fife
- Glasgow
- Highland
- Inverclyde
- Midlothian
- Moray
- Na h-Eileanan Siar (Western Isles)
- North Ayrshire
- North Lanarkshire
- Orkney
- Perth and Kinross
- Renfrewshire
- Scottish Borders
- Shetland
- South Ayrshire
- South Lanarkshire
- Stirling
- West Dunbartonshire
- West Lothian

== See also ==
- List of collegiate churches in Scotland
- List of Church of Scotland synods and presbyteries
- List of Church of Scotland parishes
