= List of listed buildings in Canisbay, Highland =

This is a list of listed buildings in the parish of Canisbay in Highland, Scotland.

== List ==
Name	Location	Date Listed	Grid Ref. (Note: Sometimes known as OSGB36, the grid reference (where provided) is based on the British national grid reference system used by the Ordnance Survey. • "Guide to National Grid". Ordnance Survey. • "Get-a-map". Ordnance Survey.)	Geo-coordinates	Notes	LB Number (Note: Historic Environment Scotland assign a unique alphanumeric identifier to each designated site in Scotland, for listed buildings this always begins with "LB", for example "LB12345".)	Image
Canisbay Old Manse Steading, Garden Walls And Gate Piers				58°38′06″N 3°07′32″W	Category B	1796	Upload Photo
Freswick House, "Mausoleum" St Madden's Chapel				58°35′16″N 3°04′22″W	Category C(S)	1803	Upload Photo
John O'Groat Mills And Mill Bridge Over Huna Burn				58°38′36″N 3°05′02″W	Category B	1804	Upload another image See more images
Canisbay Parish Church, Kirkstyle And Burial Ground. (St Drostan's Church Of Scotland				58°38′19″N 3°07′57″W	Category A	1795	Upload another image See more images
Freswick House Courtyard Walls				58°35′16″N 3°04′18″W	Category A	1799	Upload another image
Freswick House Dovecote				58°35′14″N 3°04′24″W	Category B	1802	Upload Photo
Freswick House, Steading And Enclosing Walls				58°35′14″N 3°04′16″W	Category C(S)	1801	Upload Photo
Stroma Dovecote And Burial Ground				58°40′17″N 3°06′26″W	Category B	1806	Upload Photo
West Canisbay				58°37′47″N 3°08′02″W	Category B	1807	Upload Photo
Castle Of Mey And Garden Walls				58°38′49″N 3°13′28″W	Category A	1797	Upload another image
Castle Of Mey Gate Lodge And Gate Piers				58°38′43″N 3°13′33″W	Category B	1798	Upload Photo
Freswick House, Bridge Over The Freswick Burn				58°35′15″N 3°04′19″W	Category B	1800	Upload Photo
John O'Groat Mills, Mill Cottage				58°38′37″N 3°05′04″W	Category C(S)	1805	Upload Photo

== Key ==
The scheme for classifying buildings in Scotland is:

- Category A: "buildings of national or international importance, either architectural or historic; or fine, little-altered examples of some particular period, style or building type."
- Category B: "buildings of regional or more than local importance; or major examples of some particular period, style or building type, which may have been altered."
- Category C: "buildings of local importance; lesser examples of any period, style, or building type, as originally constructed or moderately altered; and simple traditional buildings which group well with other listed buildings."

In March 2016 there were 47,288 listed buildings in Scotland. Of these, 8% were Category A, and 50% were Category B, with the remaining 42% being Category C.

== See also ==
- List of listed buildings in Highland
