= Huna House =

Victorian building in Scotland

Coordinates: 58.646°N 3.103°W

Huna House is a Victorian building located in the small village of Huna in Canisbay, north of Caithness. Built in 1870 as the Huna Hotel, it is listed as a historic place at Historic Environment Scotland. The hotel, located on the eastern edge of a rocky coastline and an intertidal sandbank from Huna House to Scotland's Haven, sits on a short cliff with views of the Island of Stroma, the double-lighthouse of Pentland Skerries, and the Orkney Islands.

== History ==
The building was greatly modernised in 1879. Seven bedrooms were located on the second floor along with one toilet which was supplied from a well in the roof.

It was run in April 1894 by John Calder, who then became bankrupt. The lease for the building was assigned to his wife who was to run the inn, which was also her residence. In 1903, James Calder was identified as the proprietor. Mrs. Isabella Calder ran the nearby John o' Groats House Hotel at that time. In 2013, it was described as a ruin, with evidence of a previous boat slip and a harbour.

== Archaeology ==
There is evidence of a Norse building or settlement near the hotel in the forms of drystone walling, pottery, and traces of midden. According to St Olaf's Saga, Hlodvir Thorfinnsson, the Earl of Orkney, was buried at Huna about 980. The sites are described as a Norse settlement site, enclosure, Norse building, Norse midden and structure, and a Norse burial site. In 1935, a Norse boat burial about 200 metres (660 ft) west of Huna House was documented by Curle. The burial was found in a mound, about 120 feet (37 m) above the waterline. By 1980, the site where the remnants of the boat—timber, chain, rivets, and metal objects—were found showed no evidence of the former burial. It is now covered by a building and landscaping.
