= UPC =

UPC may refer to:

== Companies ==
- UPC Broadband, a European provider of cable television, telephone and broadband content owned by Liberty Global
  - UPC Magyarország, Hungary
  - UPC Switzerland, TV, radio, Internet, telephone provider in Switzerland
  - UPC Poland, TV, Internet, telephone provider in Poland
- Uranium Participation Corporation, an Ontario-based holding company
- Union Pacific Corporation, a freight rolling-stock railroad holding company
- United Pictures Corporation, a mid-1960s American film production company

== Institutions ==
- Uganda People's Congress, political party in Uganda
- Union for Peace in the Central African Republic, rebel group in the Central African Republic
- Union of the Peoples of Cameroon (Union des Populations du Cameroun), political party in Cameroon
- Union for Progress and Reform, political party in Burkina Faso
- Union of Congolese Patriots, political militia group in Ituri, Democratic Republic of the Congo
- United Poultry Concerns, animal rights organization in the USA

=== Universities ===
- Polytechnic University of Catalonia (Universitat Politècnica de Catalunya), Barcelona
- Pilot University of Colombia (Universidad Piloto de Colombia)
- Peruvian University of Applied Sciences (Universidad Peruana de Ciencias Aplicadas)
- University of Plymouth Colleges network
- University of the Philippines Cebu
- University Park Campus, Nottingham
- China University of Petroleum (Huadong)

== Law ==
- Unified Patent Court, a common patent court of several European countries
- Uniform Probate Code

== Political territories ==
- United Province of Canada, 1841-1867

== Religion ==
- Universal Pentecostal Church, also known as The Pentecostal Mission
- United Pentecostal Church International
- United Presbyterian Church (disambiguation)

== Technology ==
- Universal Product Code, a barcode symbology
- Unified Parallel C, a programming language
- Uniform Plumbing Code
- Uplink Power Control
- Usage Parameter Control, in Asynchronous Transfer Mode networks
- Unique Porting Code, for mobile number portability in India

== Other uses ==
- UPC-Arena, an association football stadium in Austria
