= United Presbyterian Church =

United Presbyterian Church may refer to:

== Denominations ==
- United Presbyterian Church in the United States of America (1958–1983)
- United Presbyterian Church of North America (1858–1958)
- United Presbyterian Church of Brazil
- United Presbyterian Church of Pakistan
- United Presbyterian Church (Scotland) (1847–1900)

== Congregations and buildings ==
- United Presbyterian Church of Canehill, Arkansas
- United Presbyterian Church (Malad City, Idaho)
- United Presbyterian Church, Summerset, Scotch Ridge, Iowa
- United Presbyterian Church (Lisbon, New York)
- United Presbyterian Church and Rectory (Albany, Oregon)
- United Presbyterian Church of Shedd, Oregon
- United Presbyterian Church (Pullman, Washington)
- United Presbyterian Church, Thurso, Caithness, Scotland
