= List of listed buildings in Latheron, Highland =

This is a list of listed buildings in the parish of Latheron in Highland, Scotland.

== List ==
Name	Location	Date Listed	Grid Ref. (Note: Sometimes known as OSGB36, the grid reference (where provided) is based on the British national grid reference system used by the Ordnance Survey. • "Guide to National Grid". Ordnance Survey. • "Get-a-map". Ordnance Survey.)	Geo-coordinates	Notes	LB Number (Note: Historic Environment Scotland assign a unique alphanumeric identifier to each designated site in Scotland, for listed buildings this always begins with "LB", for example "LB12345".)	Image
Berriedale 2, Mill House				58°11′01″N 3°29′59″W	Category C(S)	7921	Upload Photo
Berriedale 1, 2, 3, Portland Terrace				58°10′57″N 3°29′55″W	Category C(S)	7923	Upload Photo
Berriedale, The White House (Former Church Of Scotland Manse)				58°11′10″N 3°29′54″W	Category C(S)	7927	Upload Photo
Latheron Post Office And Adjoining Terrace				58°17′00″N 3°22′01″W	Category B	7929	Upload Photo
Dunbeath Castle, Walled Gardens and Garden Pavilion				58°14′06″N 3°26′08″W	Category A	7936	Upload another image See more images
Dunbeath, The Village (Macewen And Farquhar)				58°14′58″N 3°25′53″W	Category C(S)	7942	Upload Photo
Gillivoan House				58°17′19″N 3°22′10″W	Category B	7950	Upload Photo
Lybster Harbour Inver House				58°17′50″N 3°17′32″W	Category B	7956	Upload Photo
Lybster Main Street (Grey Place) "Ornum" And G D Munro				58°18′06″N 3°17′06″W	Category C(S)	7961	Upload Photo
Lybster Main Street (Grey Place) 2, 3, 6 Main Street (No 6 Gowanlea) And House Right Of Gowanlea				58°18′09″N 3°17′05″W	Category C(S)	7966	Upload Photo
Lybster Quatre Bras C & A Ross Shop And Dwelling				58°18′31″N 3°17′08″W	Category C(S)	7998	Upload Photo
Nottingham Mains Steading				58°18′02″N 3°20′27″W	Category B	8000	Upload Photo
Berriedale Shore Cottages				58°11′00″N 3°29′48″W	Category C(S)	7924	Upload another image See more images
Berriedale Shore, Fishing Store And Ice House				58°10′59″N 3°29′51″W	Category C(S)	7925	Upload Photo
Berriedale Church Of Scotland And Burial Ground				58°11′22″N 3°29′48″W	Category B	7926	Upload another image See more images
Bridge Of Achavar, Over Clyth Burn				58°19′06″N 3°15′37″W	Category C(S)	7930	Upload another image
Braemore Lodge				58°15′10″N 3°35′12″W	Category B	7934	Upload another image
Dunbeath Castle Gate Lodge And Gate Piers				58°14′27″N 3°26′35″W	Category B	7938	Upload Photo
Forse House Gate Lodge And Gate Piers				58°17′25″N 3°20′32″W	Category C(S)	7948	Upload another image
Lybster Main Street (Grey Place) 2-4, 8 And 9 (No 9 "Shangri La")				58°18′08″N 3°17′05″W	Category C(S)	7967	Upload Photo
Latheronwheel Bridge Over Burn Of Latheronwheel (On A9 Road)				58°16′43″N 3°23′23″W	Category B	7985	Upload another image
Lybster Quatre Bras				58°18′28″N 3°17′08″W	Category B	7999	Upload Photo
Latheron Former Schoolhouse, School And Walls				58°17′01″N 3°22′00″W	Category B	7928	Upload Photo
Berriedale Pair Navigation Beacon Towers				58°10′52″N 3°29′54″W	Category B	7931	Upload another image
The Corr				58°18′10″N 3°21′45″W	Category A	7935	Upload Photo
Dunbeath The Village Mrs Mackay's House And Tigh A Mhuilinn (Lindsay)				58°14′57″N 3°25′52″W	Category C(S)	7941	Upload Photo
Dunbeath, Portomin Harbour, Fishing Store And Ice House				58°14′45″N 3°25′23″W	Category B	7945	Upload Photo
Lybster Harbour At Invershore				58°17′45″N 3°17′29″W	Category B	7954	Upload another image See more images
Lybster Main Street (West Side) Buchollie House				58°17′57″N 3°17′04″W	Category C(S)	7958	Upload Photo
Lybster Main Street (West Side) The Yarrows And 3-7 (Inclusive Nos) Russell Street				58°18′04″N 3°17′07″W	Category C(S)	7960	Upload Photo
Lybster Main Street (Grey Place) (East Side) Commercial Hotel				58°18′09″N 3°17′05″W	Category C(S)	7965	Upload another image
Latheron Wheel (Janetstown) Craiglea				58°16′35″N 3°23′06″W	Category C(S)	7982	Upload Photo
Buldoo Bell Tower				58°17′08″N 3°21′44″W	Category B	10950	Upload another image
Swiney House				58°17′46″N 3°18′23″W	Category B	8003	Upload Photo
Berriedale 1 Mill House				58°11′01″N 3°30′00″W	Category C(S)	7933	Upload Photo
Dunbeath Hotel				58°14′58″N 3°25′55″W	Category C(S)	7944	Upload Photo
Forse House Hotel				58°17′59″N 3°20′41″W	Category B	7946	Upload another image
Forse House Hotel, Small House To Rear And Walled Garden				58°18′00″N 3°20′38″W	Category B	7947	Upload another image
Lybster Ha' Store And Garden Walls				58°18′33″N 3°16′34″W	Category C(S)	7957	Upload Photo
Lybster Main Street, (Grey Place) A H Sinclair Shop And Dwelling				58°18′06″N 3°17′07″W	Category C(S)	7962	Upload Photo
Berriedale, 2 Bridges Over Berriedale And Langwell Waters				58°11′03″N 3°30′05″W	Category C(S)	7968	Upload Photo
Berriedale War Memorial, Berriedale				58°11′02″N 3°30′04″W	Category B	7969	Upload another image See more images
Latheron Wheel House				58°16′27″N 3°23′50″W	Category B	7980	Upload Photo
Lybster Main Street Craigard (L) And Milton (R)				58°18′01″N 3°17′03″W	Category B	7996	Upload Photo
Dunbeath, Salmon Bothy				58°14′42″N 3°25′17″W	Category B	42894	Upload Photo
Lybster, Main Street, (Grey's Place, East Side) Church Of Scotland, (St Mary's Church)				58°18′10″N 3°17′05″W	Category B	10951	Upload Photo
Ousdale Farmhouse				58°09′34″N 3°34′52″W	Category C(S)	8002	Upload Photo
Berriedale, Saw Mill				58°11′01″N 3°29′57″W	Category B	7922	Upload Photo
Dunbeath Castle Dovecote				58°14′29″N 3°26′40″W	Category B	7939	Upload Photo
Laidhay Croft Museum Croft House And Barn				58°15′21″N 3°24′33″W	Category A	7951	Upload another image See more images
Latheron Old Parish Church And Burial Ground				58°16′53″N 3°21′43″W	Category B	7952	Upload another image See more images
Forse House Dovecote				58°17′59″N 3°20′49″W	Category A	7949	Upload Photo
Lybster Harbour, Fishery Office				58°17′48″N 3°17′32″W	Category C(S)	7955	Upload Photo
Latheronwheel, (Janetstown) Cooper's Buildings				58°16′22″N 3°22′45″W	Category B	7984	Upload Photo
Berriedale, Welbeck Estate, Ivy Cottage And Laundry				58°11′06″N 3°30′06″W	Category B	50836	Upload Photo
Berriedale, Welbeck Estate Office, Berriedale Post Office And Stable/Byre Range				58°11′05″N 3°30′06″W	Category B	7932	Upload Photo
Dunbeath Castle, Stable Court				58°14′11″N 3°26′22″W	Category B	7937	Upload Photo
Lybster Main Street, (Grey Place) Post Office And "Greymouth"				58°18′07″N 3°17′07″W	Category C(S)	7963	Upload Photo
Latheronwheel (Janetstown) Barn/Store Immediately West Of Craiglea				58°16′35″N 3°23′08″W	Category B	7983	Upload Photo
Latheronwheel (Janetstown) Harbour Bridge Over Burn Of Latheronwheel				58°16′16″N 3°22′59″W	Category C(S)	7986	Upload another image See more images
Lybster Main Street (Grey Place) (East Side) Dwelling And Shop D Munro				58°18′07″N 3°17′04″W	Category C(S)	7995	Upload Photo
Ousdale Bridge Over The Ousdale Burn				58°09′43″N 3°35′22″W	Category C(S)	8001	Upload another image
Swiney, Miss Lillie's House				58°18′03″N 3°18′28″W	Category C(S)	8004	Upload Photo
Dunbeath Bridge Over The Dunbeath Water (On A9 Road)				58°14′58″N 3°25′58″W	Category B	7940	Upload another image
Dunbeath, The Village Murray M Smythe Shop				58°14′58″N 3°25′54″W	Category C(S)	7943	Upload Photo
Latheron, Former Free Church Manse, Steading And Garden Walls				58°17′04″N 3°22′08″W	Category C(S)	7953	Upload Photo
Lybster, Main Street, (West Side) Clydesdale Bank				58°18′03″N 3°17′06″W	Category B	7959	Upload another image
Lybster Main Street (Grey Place) C Macdonald				58°18′07″N 3°17′07″W	Category C(S)	7964	Upload Photo
Braemore Bridge Over The Berriedale Water				58°15′10″N 3°34′54″W	Category B	7970	Upload another image See more images
Latheron Wheel (Janets Town) Melbourne				58°16′35″N 3°23′05″W	Category C(S)	7981	Upload Photo
Lybster Portland Arms				58°18′30″N 3°17′11″W	Category C(S)	7997	Upload another image

== Key ==
The scheme for classifying buildings in Scotland is:

- Category A: "buildings of national or international importance, either architectural or historic; or fine, little-altered examples of some particular period, style or building type."
- Category B: "buildings of regional or more than local importance; or major examples of some particular period, style or building type, which may have been altered."
- Category C: "buildings of local importance; lesser examples of any period, style, or building type, as originally constructed or moderately altered; and simple traditional buildings which group well with other listed buildings."

In March 2016 there were 47,288 listed buildings in Scotland. Of these, 8% were Category A, and 50% were Category B, with the remaining 42% being Category C.

== See also ==
- List of listed buildings in Highland
