= Huna, Caithness =

Coordinates: 58.642°N 3.087°W

Huna
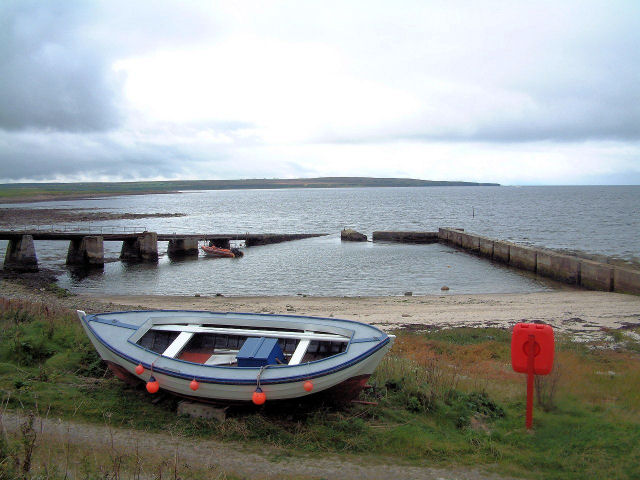
- Huna harbour

- Location within the Caithness area
- Population: 139
- OS grid reference: ND369732
- Council area: Highland
- Lieutenancy area: Caithness
- Country: Scotland
- Sovereign state: United Kingdom
- Post town: WICK
- Postcode district: KW1 4YL
- Dialling code: 01955
- Police: Scotland
- Fire: Scottish
- Ambulance: Scottish
- UK Parliament: Caithness, Sutherland and Easter Ross
- Scottish Parliament: Caithness, Sutherland and Ross

Huna is a small remote crofting township, located 1 mile northeast of Canisbay and 1.5 miles west of John o' Groats in Caithness, in Scotland. It is currently part of the Highland Council area.

== History ==
Huna is likely to have been an important sheltered port from Norse times and it has been suggested that it equates to Hofn, the burial place in 980 of Hlodvar Thorfinnsson, the Norse Jarl of Orkney. In The Place-Names of Canisbay, Caithness, Huna is described as:

A crofting township two miles west from John o' Groat's, situated at the foot of the Mool Hill. Bordered on the west side by the burn of Huna, and on the east side by the Ness of Huna, a small crest–like peninsula which terminates in a beach. On Huna links are the remains of a Picts' village and several burial cairns. It is supposed to be the burial place of earl Hlǫðver, who, the saga states, was buried at Hǫfn in Katanes, about 975. The haven of Huna is a sandy beach. O.N. hǫfn > ham in Orkney and Shetland, and there is a Ham in Dunnet adjoining an earth-house. Myrkkol, now Murkle, where Hlǫðver’s brother, earl Arnfinnr, lived, is much nearer Ham than Huna. In Caithness charter, 1574, Hwnaye; 1777 Houna. Cf. Huney in Shetland, O.N. Húna-ey, the island of a man Húni. O.N. *Húna-á, the burn of Húni. Cosmo Innes in Orig. Par. Scot. suggested, "Huna appears to be the Hofn where earl Hlodver was buried" — a suggestion which apparently arose from an impossible derivation.

John o' Groat (Jan de Grot) ran a ferry from Huna to Orkney c. 1500 and a mail service between Huna and South Ronaldsay began in 1819.

=== Fishing ===
The Annual Reports of the Fishery Board for Scotland provide an insight into the state of fishing from Duncansby and Huna in the years before the First World War.

Fishery Statistics

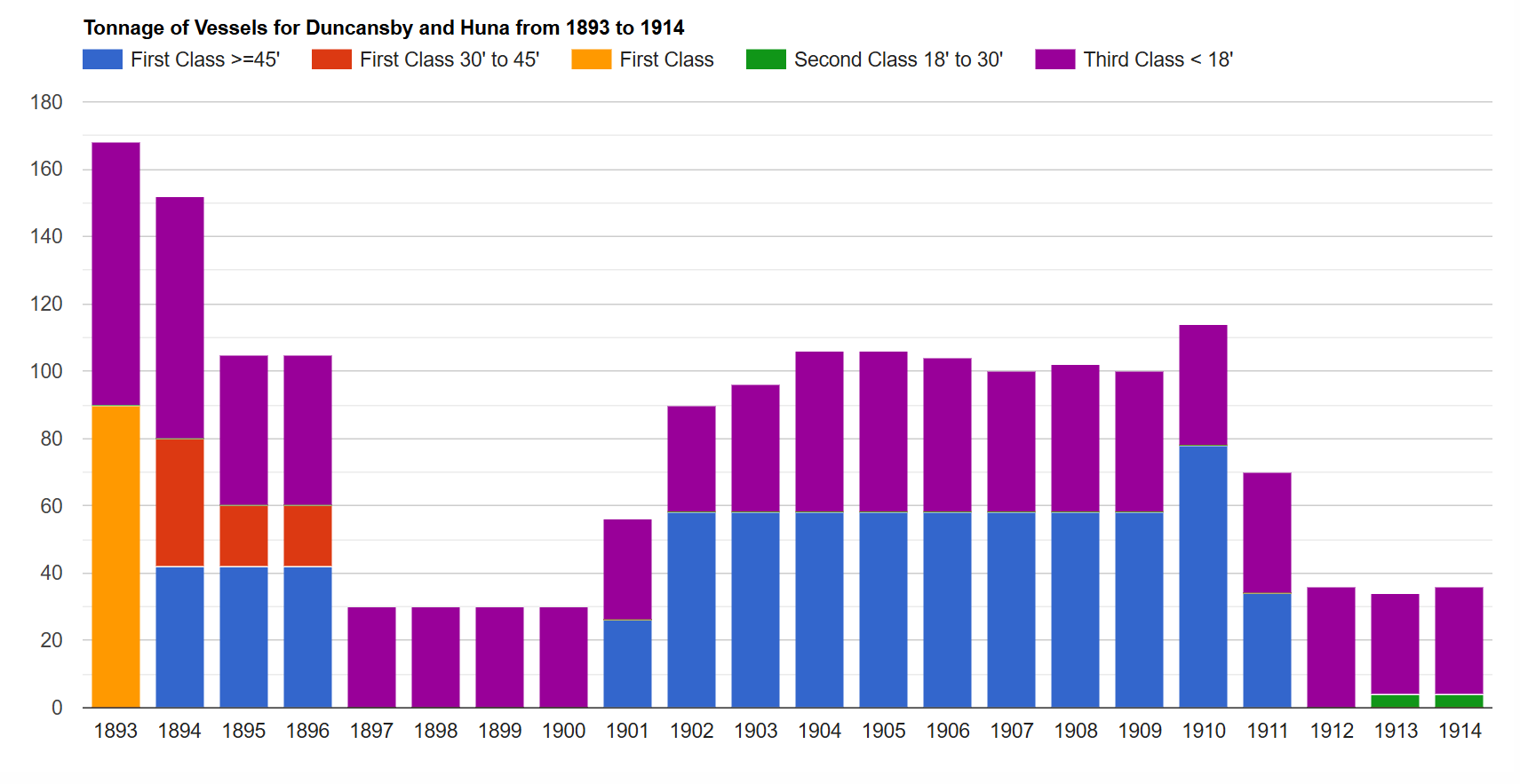
Tonnage of vessels

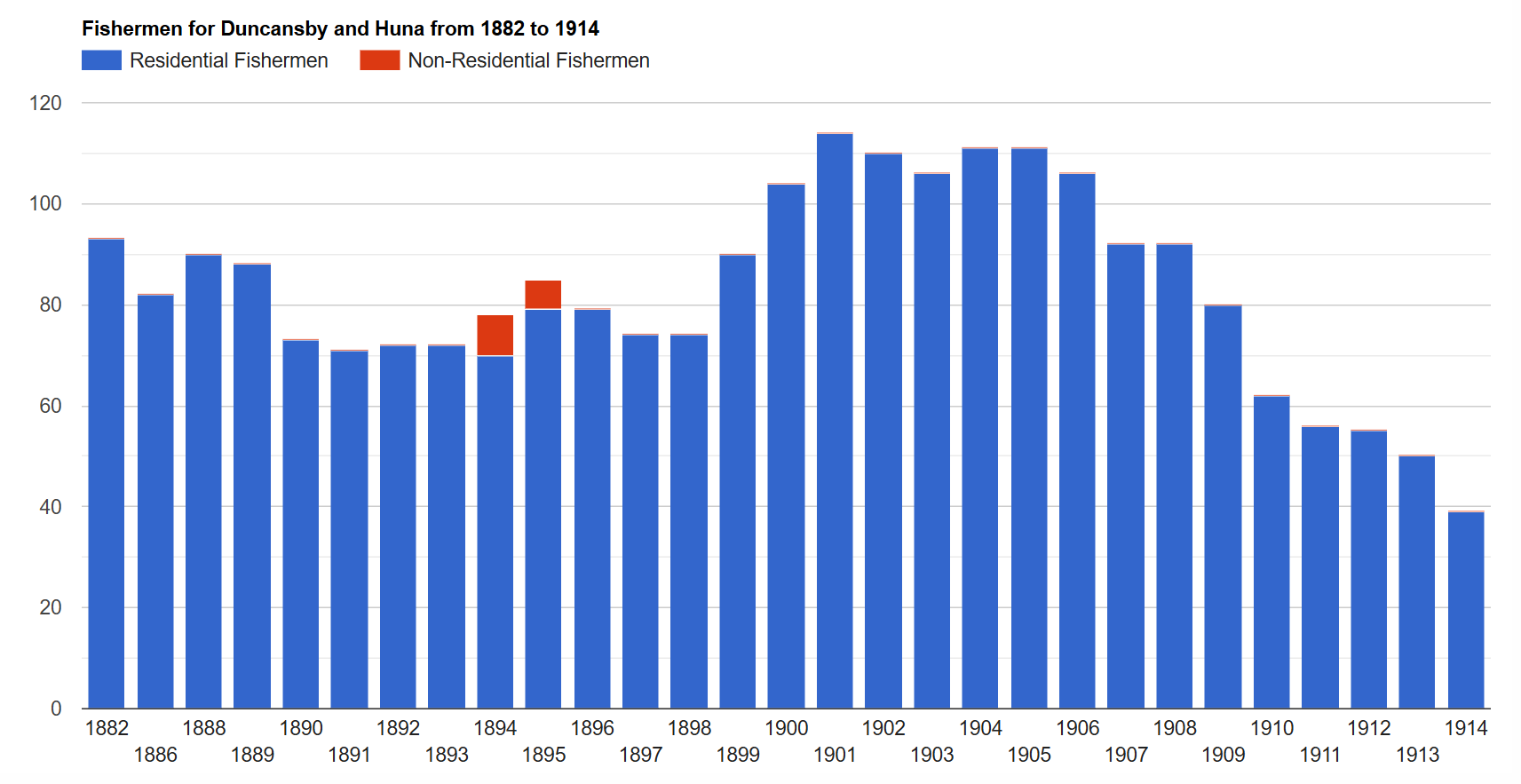
Fishermen

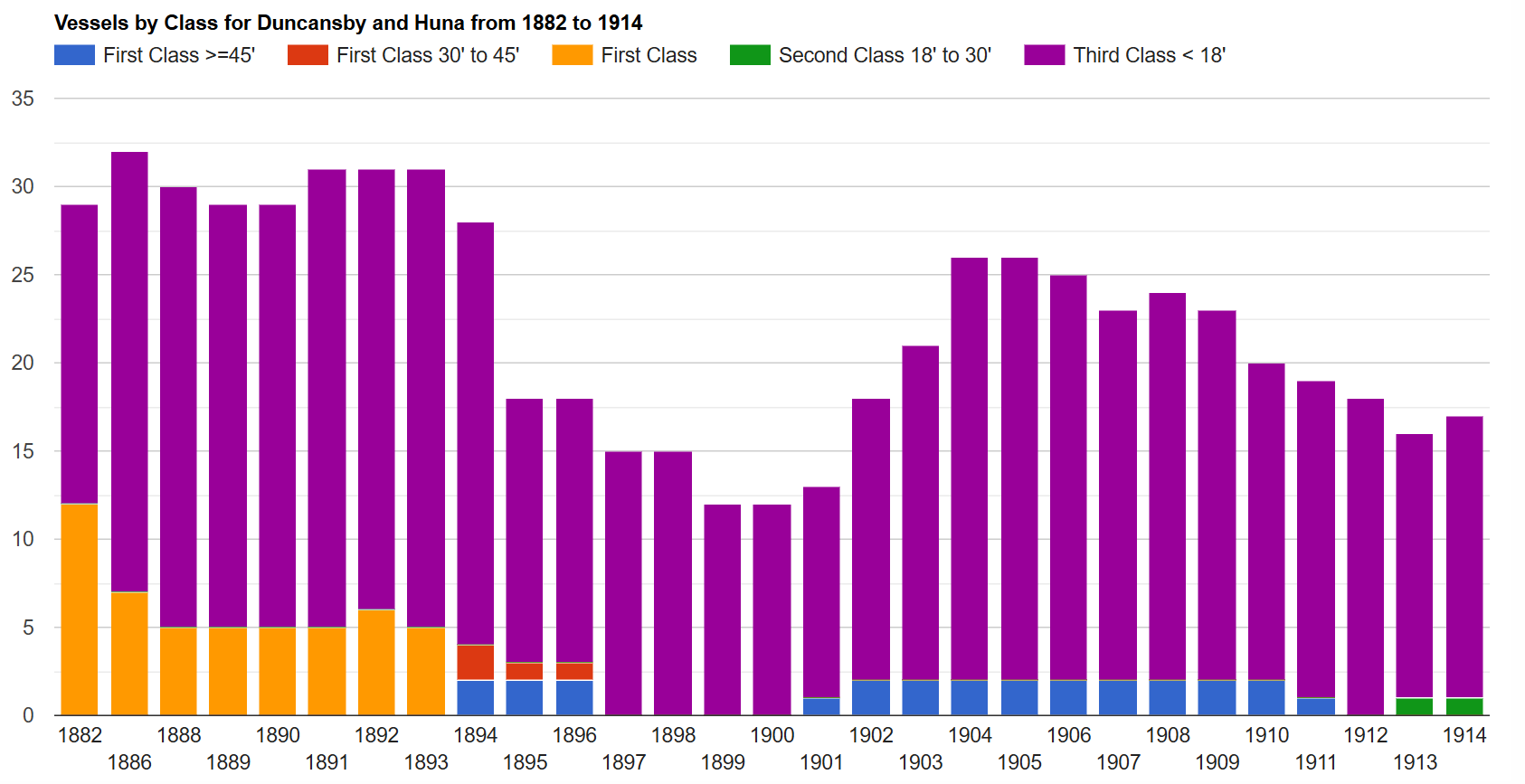
Vessels by class

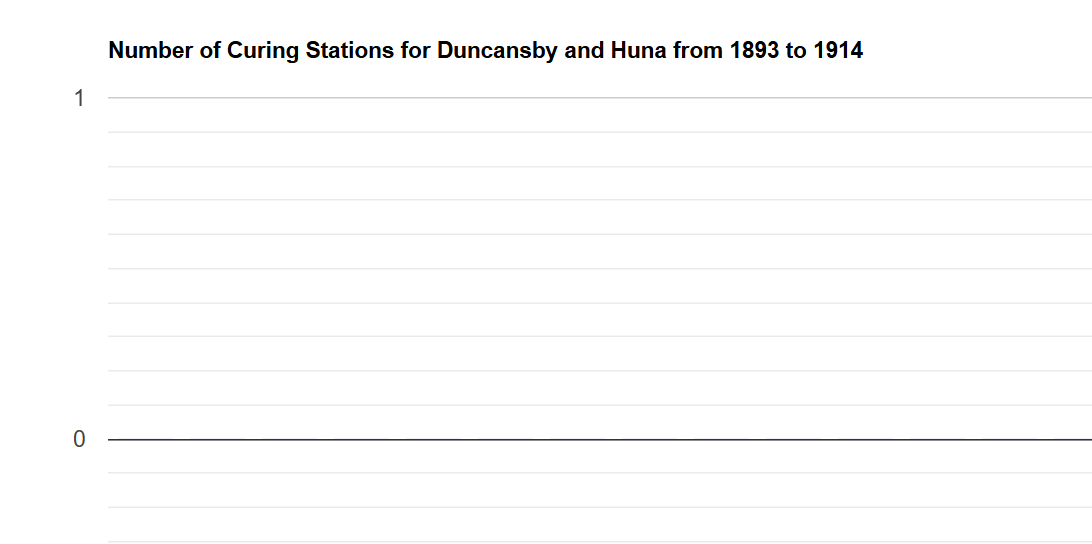
Number of curing stations

The report for 1908 states that "like most small creeks in [the] district, [there is] little prospect of development of [the] fishing industry." The principal kinds of fish landed were cod and lobsters.

== Archaeology ==
The following sites are recorded on Highland Council's Historic Environment Record (HER)

- MHG 1735 and MHG 39848 Site of Norse building and midden at ND 3592 7357 Drystone walling and midden material within a sand mound
- MHG 2525 Mound, boat burial at ND 3599 7363 Recorded by Curle in 1935 as eroding out of the sand at the top of the bank, and containing wood, rivets, chain and metal objects.
- MHG 1742 Mound, boat burial at ND 3610 7360. Probably an incorrect location and confused with the above site, now overlaid by recent building work and landscaping (1982)
- MHG 1743 Mound, Norse walling at ND 3603 7365. Mound measuring 15m by 9.8m with exposed walling, but now obscured by modern rubbish dumping (1982)
- MHG 1739 Banked enclosure at ND 3623 7352. Cropmark measuring 25m in diameter but no visible evidence on the ground

The first four of these sites occupy the crest of the rise from the shoreline to the west of Huna House, while the last is in the field to the NE of the field in which the present development is located.

== Property ownership ==
Over the last 2000 years Huna has been owned as a part of the greater area of Caithness under wider ownership such as the Pictish Kingdoms and later the Estates of Mey. The possibility of individual ownership of land and property within Huna and nearby townships didn't occur until 1952 when the estates of Mey were broken up and sold by Captain Fredrick Bouhier Imbert-Terry, including the sale of individual crofts within Huna.

Approximate Dates	Owners	Notes
25 - 871 AD	Kingdom of Cat (Cait), Pictish Kingdom	Kingdom Waned from 697AD After the death of King Taran mac Entifidich
871 AD - Unknown	Wider Pictish Kingdom	
Unknown	Norse Kingdoms	possible burial place in 980AD of Hlodvar Thorfinnsson the Norse Earl of Orkney
Unknown	Earls of Orkney (Norway)	Caithness Disputed as part of Norway and Scotland
Unknown	Bishops of Caithness	As part of the Bishoprics of King David 1st
1334 - 1335	Earls of Caithness (1st Creation)	Forfeited to the Crown
1335 - 1375	Scottish Crown	
1375 - 1437	Earls of Caithness (2nd Creation)	Awarded to Son of Robert II of Scotland later Forfeited by 3rd Earl
1437 - 1452	Scottish Crown	
1452 - August 1454	George Crichton Earls of Caithness (3rd Creation)	Passed to Crown by Agreement upon death
August 1454 - 1455	Scottish Crown	
1455 - 1889	1st - 15th Earls of Caithness (4th Creation)	Grant unto William Sinclair, 1st Earl of Caithness Builder of Rosslyn Chapel
1889	Mr F.G. Heathcote (Sinclair)	Estate of Mey Bequeathed by 15th Earl of Caithness
Unknown	Captain Fredrick Bouhier Imbert-Terry	Purchased the Estates of Mey from the widow of Mr F.G Heathcote (Sinclair)
1952	Individual Ownership	Mey Estate broken up and sold including Castle of Mey and Crofts of Huna
