= List of churches in Shetland =

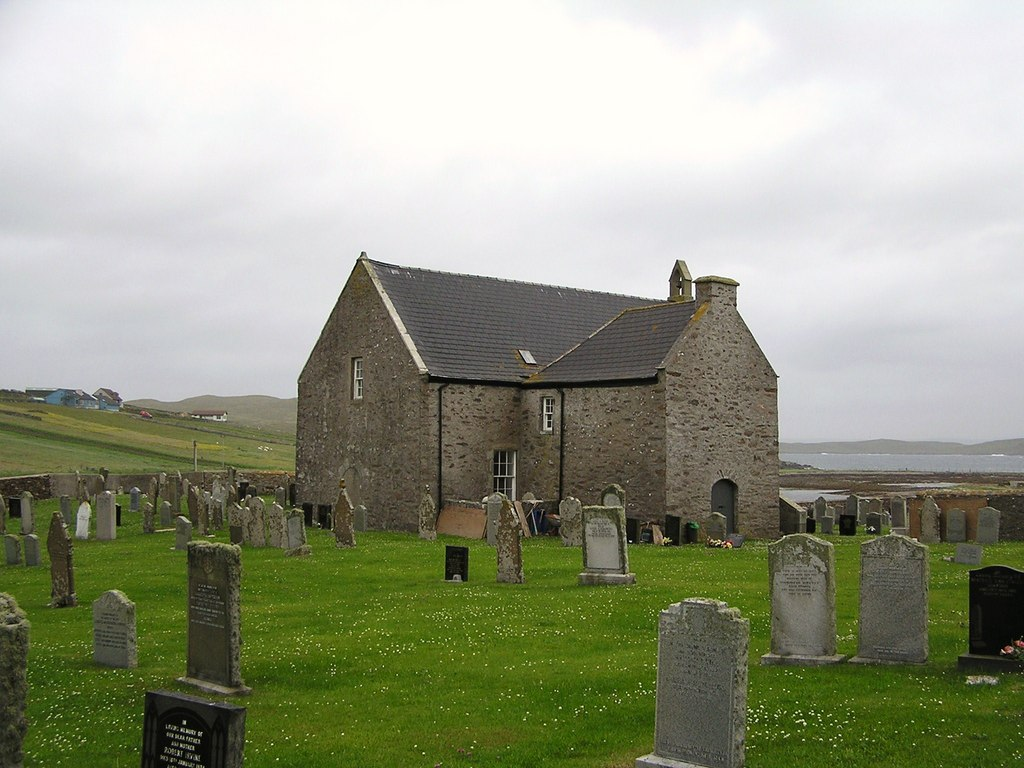
Whalsay Kirk

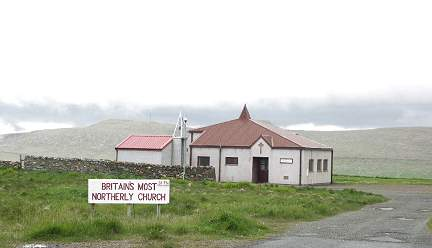
Haroldswick Methodist Church, the most northerly church building in the UK

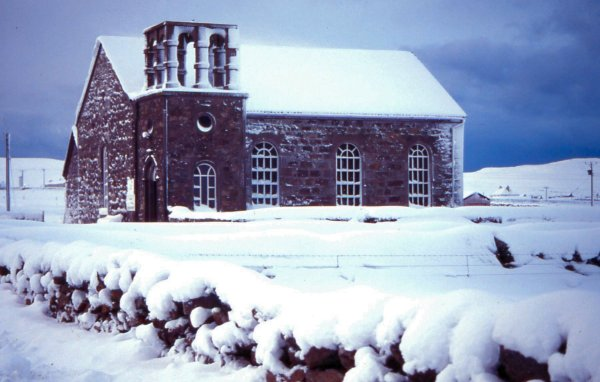
St John's Church, Baltasound

A List of churches in Shetland, Scotland.

The Reformation reached Shetland in 1560. This was an apparently peaceful transition and there is little evidence of religious intolerance in Shetland's recorded history. A variety of different religious denominations are represented in the islands.

The islands were originally covered by 12 civil parishes: Bressay, Delting, Dunrossness, Fetlar, Lerwick, Nesting, Northmaven, Sandsting, Tingwall, Unst, Walls and Sandness, and Yell.

== Church of Scotland ==
The Church of Scotland has a Presbytery of Shetland.

- Bressay Church, Bressay
- Fetlar Kirk, Fetlar
- St Magnus Kirk, Hamnavoe, Yell
- St Columba's Church, Lerwick, Mainland
- St John's Church, Baltasound, Unst
- Whalsay Parish Church, Whalsay

== Episcopalian ==
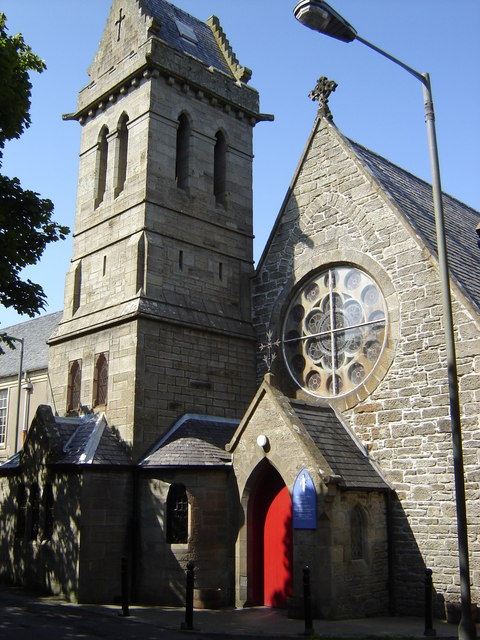
St Magnus Episcopal Church, Lerwick

Shetland is part of the Diocese of Aberdeen and Orkney of the Scottish Episcopal Church.

- The Chapel of Jesus the Good Shepherd, Westing, Unst is maintained by the Anglican religious order of nuns, the Society of Our Lady of the Isles. Their previous place of worship, the Chapel of Christ the Encompasser, Fetlar has now been sold.
- St Colman's Church, Burravoe, Yell, the most northerly Episcopal parish church in Scotland.
- St Magnus' Church, Lerwick, Mainland.

== Methodist ==
The Methodist Church has a relatively high membership in Shetland, which is a District of the Methodist Church (with the whole of the rest of Scotland comprising a separate District). There are 53 Methodist congregations in Scotland, of which 13 (almost a quarter) are located in Shetland.

- Haroldswick Methodist Church, Haroldswick, Unst is the most northerly church building in the UK.

== Roman Catholic ==
Shetland is part of the Roman Catholic Diocese of Aberdeen. There is only one Catholic Church in Shetland, located in Lerwick. However, Mass is said in other places, using other places of worship belonging to other Christian groups on an occasional basis.

- Church of St Margaret and the Sacred Heart, Lerwick, Mainland
