= Cill Chriosd =

Cill Chroisd
- Christ Church Parish Church
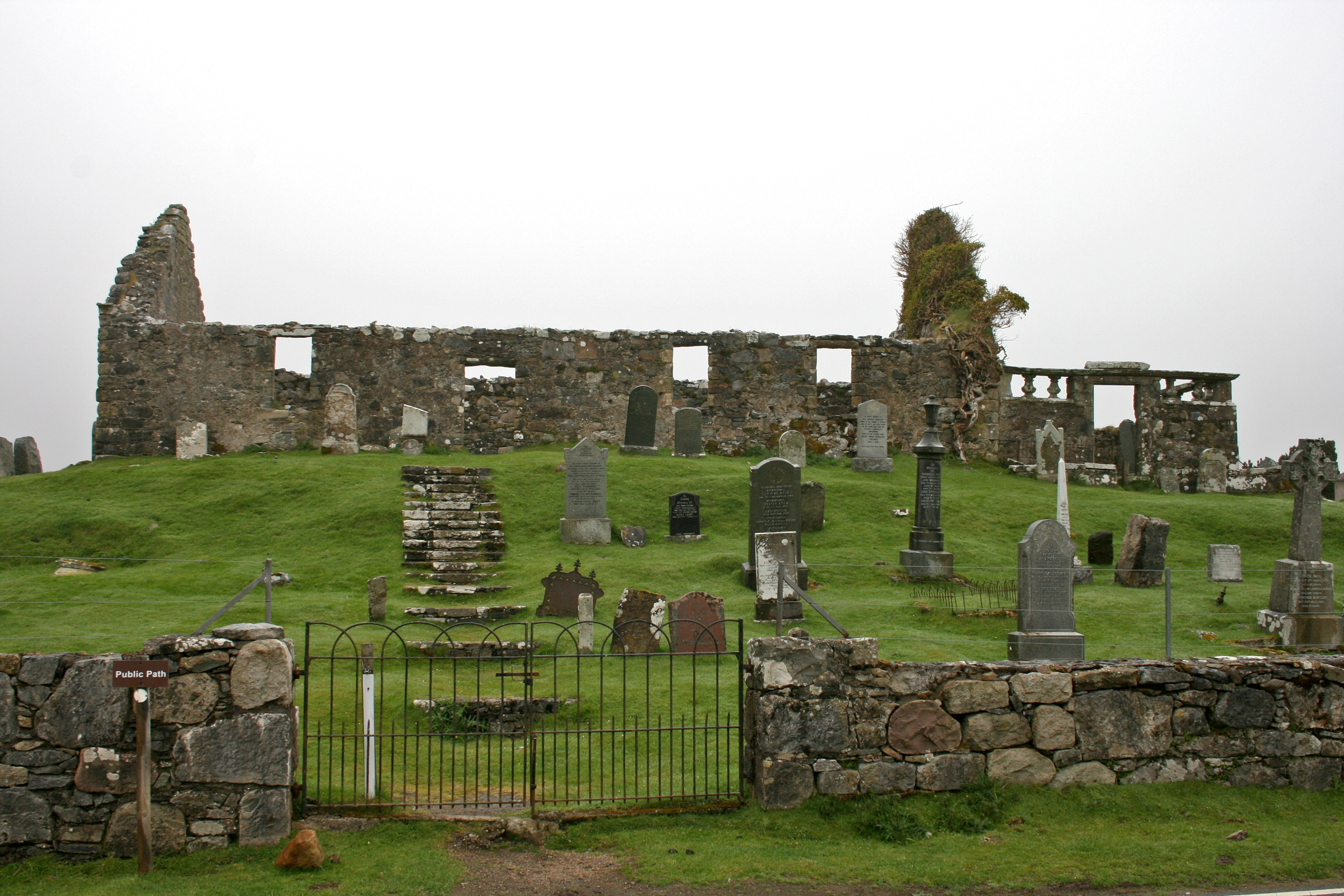
- The ruins of the church in 2010
- Cill Chroisd
- 57°12′53″N 5°56′54″W
- OS grid reference: NG 617 207
- Location: Strath Suardal
- Country: Scotland
- Denomination: Church of Scotland

History
- Status: Ruins

Architecture
- Groundbreaking: 16th Century
- Closed: 1840

Administration
- Parish: Strath

Cill Chriosd or Kilchrist (Christ's Church) is a ruined former parish church of Strath, on the Isle of Skye, Scotland. It was constructed around the 16th century, replacing an earlier medieval church on the same location, and was used until 1840 when the parish church was relocated to Broadford. It lies on the B8083 Broadford to Torrin and Elgol road.

== Layout ==
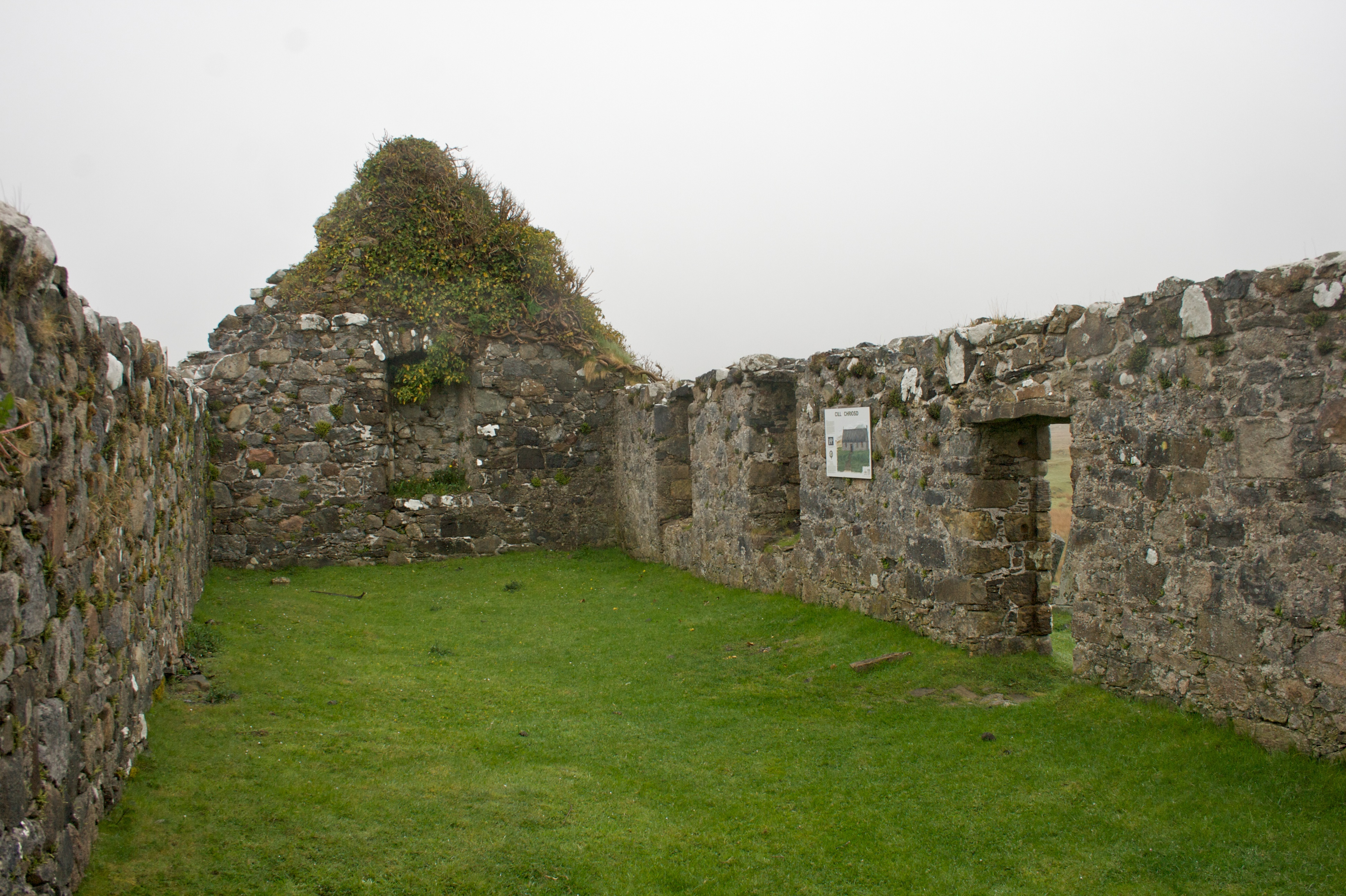
The inside of the ruined church

The ruins of the church lie at the top of a small mound, surrounded by the graveyard. It has been described by Miers as follows: "The long, low, rubble ruin of the post-Reformation parish church of Strath has roughly dressed quoins and jambs, and a balustraded burial enclosure added to the east gable in the early 18th century for the Mackinnons."

The church doorway, in the south wall, has splayed jambs and check and square sconsions. The south wall also has three windows, with check and inward splay; the east gable has a similar window, which is now built up. The insides measure 52 feet 9 inches (16.08 m) by 17 feet 6 inches (5.33 m). The side walls are 8 feet (2.4 m) tall and 2 feet 3 inches (0.69 m) deep, with the gables 2 feet 10 inches (0.86 m) in thickness. The church is 30 degrees from due east–west, and has no openings in the north and west walls.

== History ==
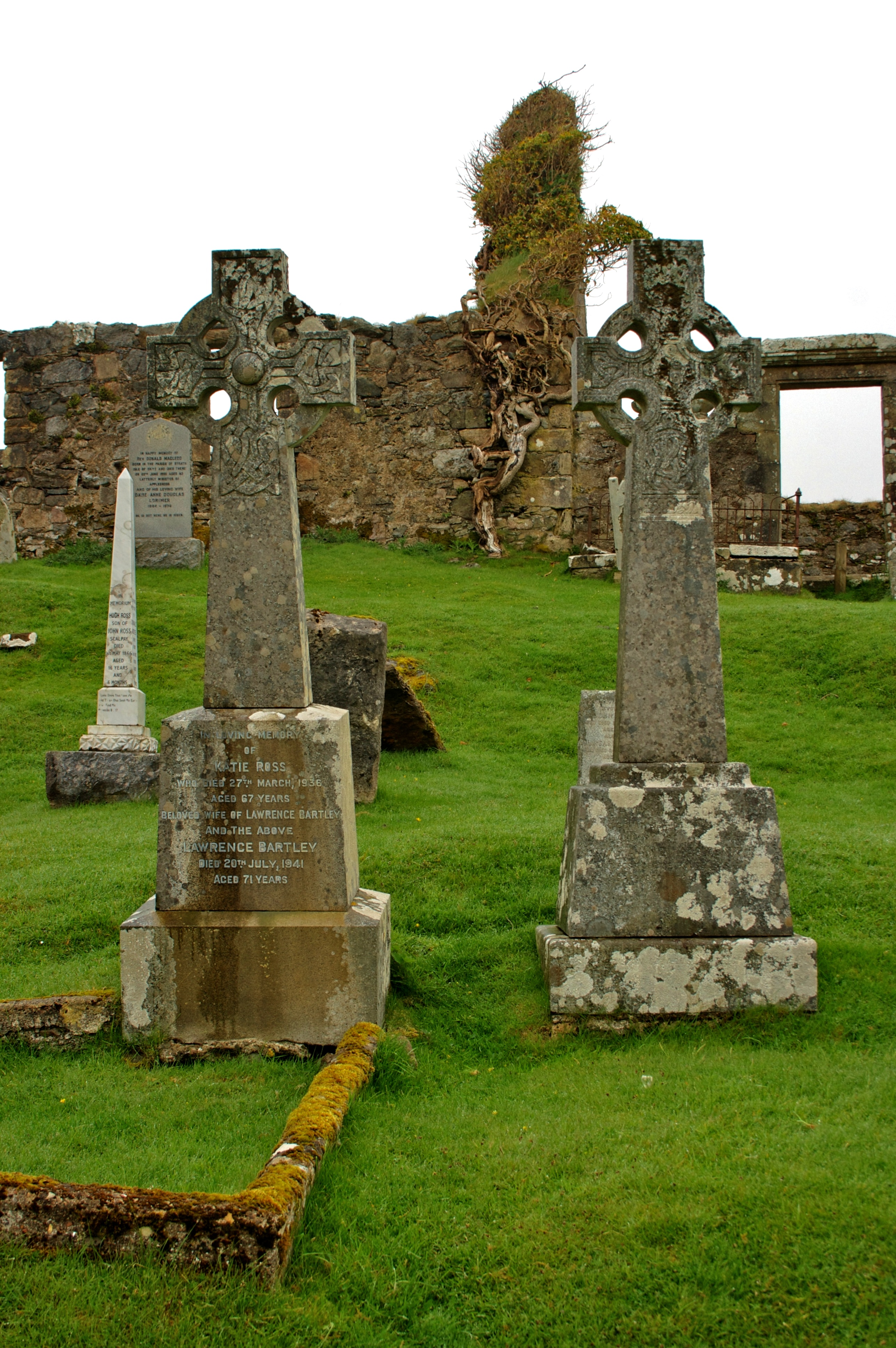
Gravestones in the graveyard

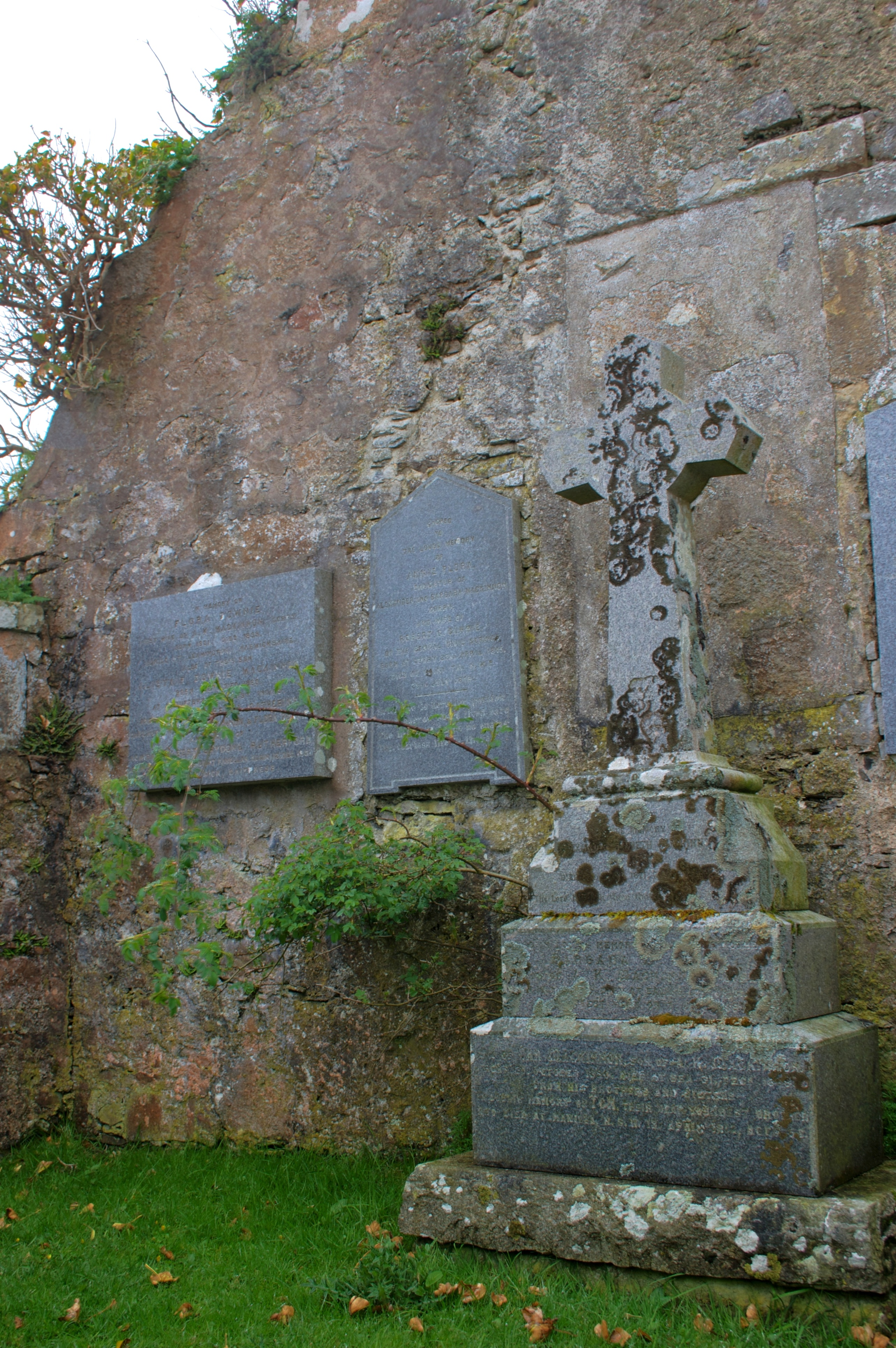
Gravestones in the burial enclosure

The church is the remains of the parish church of Strath, including the cleared villages of Boreraig and Susinish.

The location is thought to have a heritage of Christian worship dating back to the 7th century, when St Mael Ruba preached from nearby Cnoc na-Aifhreann ("hill of the mass"). The original parish church for Strath was located at Ashiag, and was founded by St Mael Ruba in the 7th century; the new parish church was relocated to this location in the later Middle Ages. The present ruined church probably replaced the first medieval stone church in the 16th century. Written records for the church date back to 1505, although the earliest records only give a list of the names of the ministers. In 1505 the chaplain Kenneth ("Kensoch") Adamson succeeded John MacGillebredison, before being replaced by John Johnson, and then John Ronaldson in 1508 after Johnson's death.

On 19 June 1627, Neil Mackinnon became the first Protestant minister of the church. During his appointment ceremony he "gave his grite and solemn oath that he all treulie according to his knowledge, give up the Clerk of Councell the names of all the Papists he knew within the Isles". It is recorded that he only allowed his workmen one meal on Sundays (rather than two, as for other days) as they were resting. However, one Sunday two hungry workmen waited until after MacKinnon had finished preaching and had left the church before setting to work with their foot plough. Following this, the preacher allowed them two meals every day.

Cill Chriosd was replaced by a new parish church in Broadford in 1840.

== Graveyard ==
Records from 1913 show that there were a pair of unusual gravemarkers in the graveyard - one dedicated to Chief Lachlan Mor and carrying "obscure hieroglyphics", the other possibly dating from the pre-Christian era. However, both have since vanished. Most graves are connected to Clan MacKinnon, and are from the 18th and 19th centuries. One memorial, in the inner wall of the burial enclosure, is for "Charles Third", who was apparently born in Corry near Broadford as a MacKinnon but later died in Australia after emigrating. A worn medieval slab carved with an ornate cross is located in the south corner of the graveyard.

The churchyard also has an armorial stone, as well as a possible fragment of the necking and lower arms of a crude cross, with one side plane and the other side bearing two animals carved into a relief on the lower portion. The graveyard also contains a slab of slate with a foliated cross, with one side preserved but the other side worn away.

The graveyard appears in the 1984 video "Lament" by Ultravox.
