= Broadford Parish Church =

Broadford Parish Church, Skye
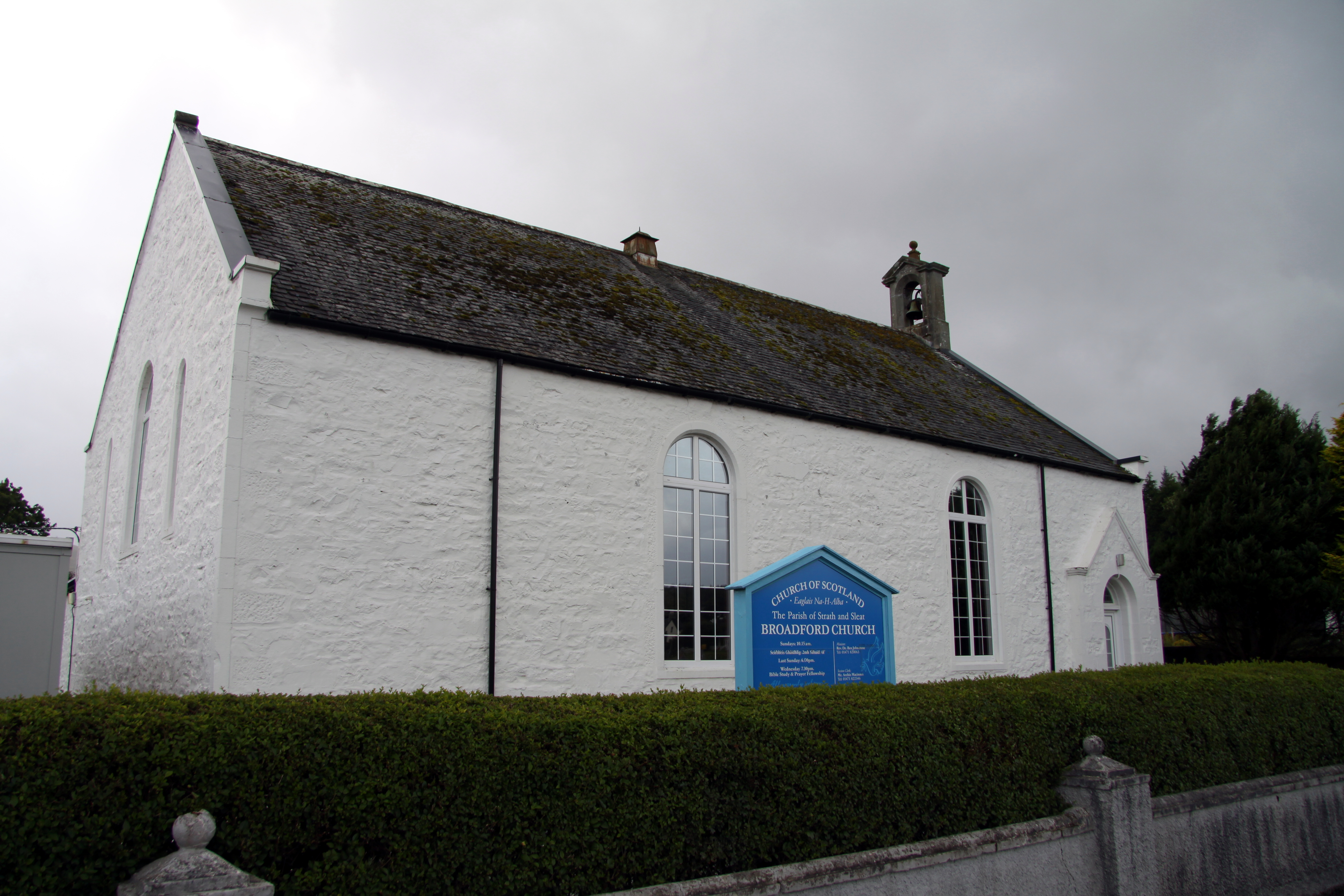
- Broadford Parish Church, Skye
- Broadford Parish Church, Skye
- 57°14′28.84″N 5°54′31.83″W
- Location: Broadford, Skye
- Country: Scotland
- Denomination: Church of Scotland
- Website: sschurch.co.uk

Architecture
- Architect: James Ferguson
- Groundbreaking: 1839
- Completed: 1841

Administration
- Parish: Strath and Sleet

Broadford Parish Church, Skye is a parish church in the Church of Scotland in Broadford, Skye.

== History ==
The church was built between 1839 and 1841, and replaced the 16th century church of Cill Chriosd. Broadford church has round headed windows, a pedimented bellcote and a flat Tudor doorpiece.

Repairs were made in 1884, and the interior was altered in the 1930s.
