= Berriedale Church =

Church in Highland, Scotland

Coordinates: 58.18951°N 3.496655°W

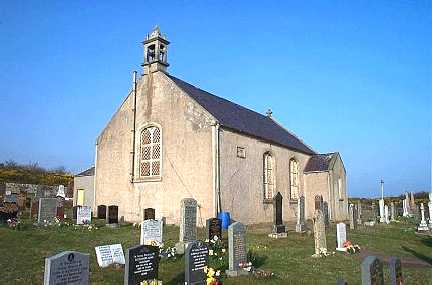
Berriedale Church and burial grounds

Berriedale Church is a former church in the parish of Latheron, in Berriedale, Caithness, Scotland. Built in 1826, the T-plan building was closed as a parish church in 2008 but serves as charity under the auspices of the Berriedale Church and Cemetery Association. The Berriedale Church of Scotland and Burial Ground is a category B listed building.

== Geography ==
The building is situated close to the sea and on the north side of Berriedale's deep ravine. It is 6 miles (9.7 km) from the nearest land boundary of the parish, and 20 miles (32 km) from the furthest boundary. Access to the church is impeded by mountains, rivers, brooks, and marshes.

== History ==
The church of Berriedale was built in 1826 by government, at an expense of £750. In 1827, the church was made as a "parliamentary church" under the act 5 Geo. 4. c. 90, on a piece of ground conveyed to the commissioners under the act by James Home of Langwell. The church was surrounded by a stone wall. As early as 1833, interments had been made in the ground enclosed by the wall, and immediately surrounding the church. In 1846, the parliamentary church and district were erected into the quoad sacra parish of Berriedale. In 1892, the minister of the parish was the Rev. Daniel Macdougall. There being no resident elders in the parish, the kirksession consisted of the minister and two assessors from the Presbytery of Caithness. There were no pew rents derived from the seats in the church. The church was capable of being enlarged, by erecting galleries.

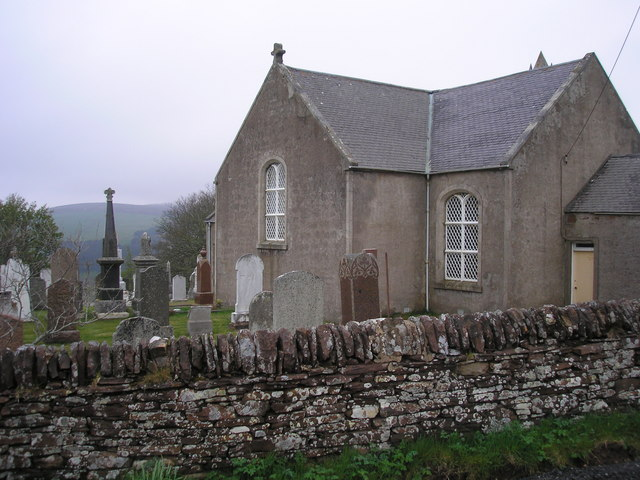
Berriedale Church, wall, and burials grounds

The Duke of Portland was the heritor liable for the repair of the church. In March 1892, the duke's factor advertised for tenders for proposed repairs "on the enclosure round Berriedale churchyard." Thereafter the repairs were proceeded with, consisting of taking down and rebuilding portions of the wall, and alterations in the form of the gateways.
