= List of churches in West Lothian =

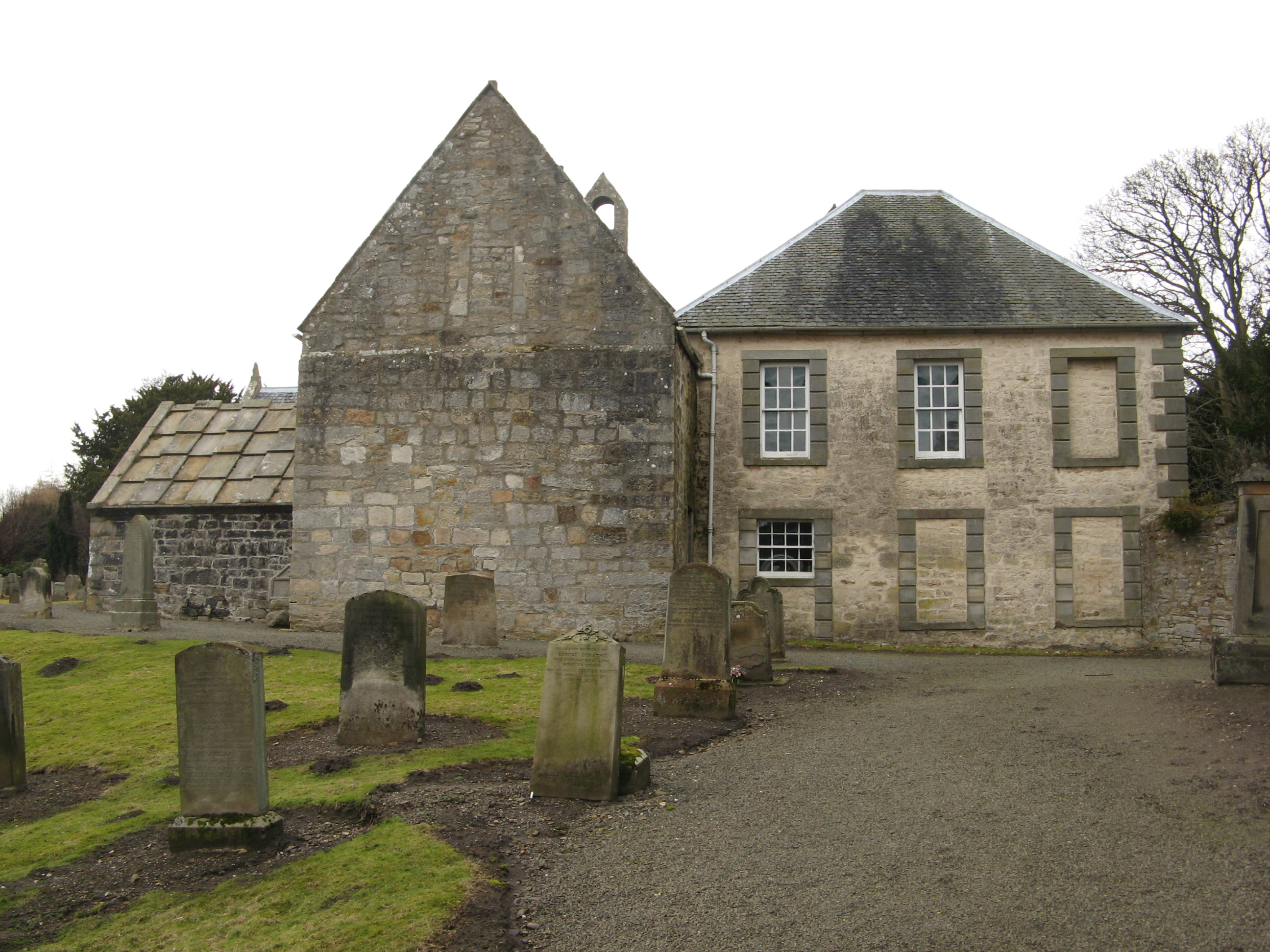
Abercorn Church

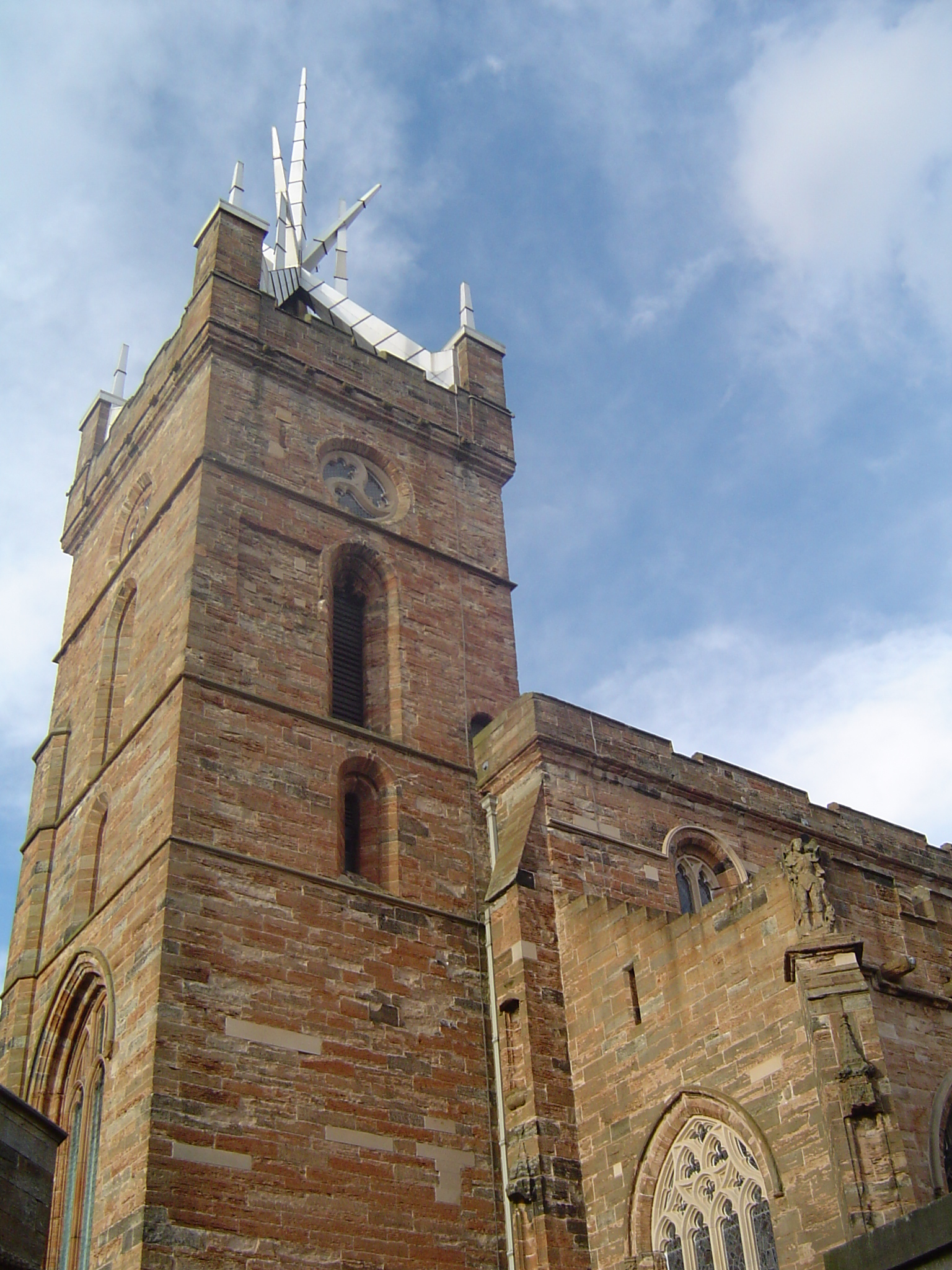
St Michael's Parish Church, Linlithgow

A list of churches in West Lothian, Scotland:

- Abercorn Church
- Breich Valley Parish Church
- Brucefield Church
- Centrepoint Church
- Kingscavil Church
- Mid Calder Parish Church
- St Andrew's Church, Craigshill
- St Cuthbert's Church, East Calder
- St Michael's Parish Church, Linlithgow
- St Nicholas Church, Uphall
- Torphichen Preceptory
- Ladywell Baptist Church
- Dedridge Baptist Church
- Broxburn Baptist Church
- Limefield:West Calder United Free Church
