= Lochbroom Free Church =

Coordinates: 57.8971°N 5.1613°W

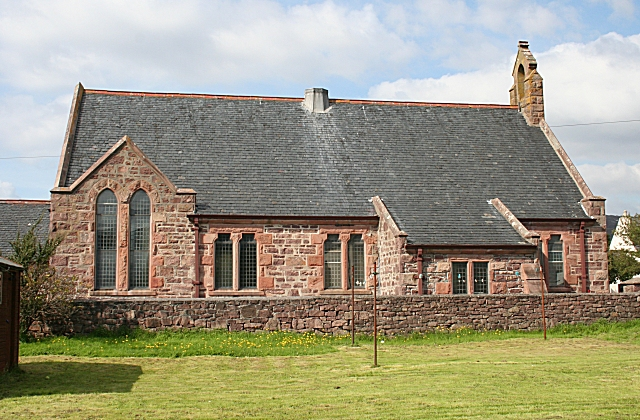
- Lochbroom Free Church of Scotland
- Lochbroom Free Church
- Location: Ullapool
- Country: Scotland
- Denomination: Free Church of Scotland

History
- Founded: 1843
- Founder: George MacLeod

Architecture
- Functional status: church
- Style: Gothic
- Groundbreaking: 1908
- Completed: 1909

The Lochbroom Free Church is a place of worship of the Free Church of Scotland in Ullapool, in the Highland council area of Scotland. The church was built in 1909.
