= Lothbeg =

Hamlet in Sutherland, Scotland

Coordinates: 58.06959°N 3.78522°W

Lothbeg: Scottish Gaelic: Loth Beag
- Location within the Sutherland area
- OS grid reference: NC947103
- Council area: Highland
- Lieutenancy area: Sutherland
- Country: Scotland
- Sovereign state: United Kingdom
- Post town: Helmsdale
- Postcode district: KW8 6
- Police: Scotland
- Fire: Scottish
- Ambulance: Scottish

Lothbeg is a small coastal hamlet, on the coast of the North Sea in eastern Sutherland, Scottish Highlands and is in the Scottish council area of Highland. The main Edinburgh to Thurso A9 road runs through Lothbeg. The hamlet is 6 miles (10 km) south-west of Helmsdale, and Brora is 4 miles (6 km) southwest along the A9.

The meaning is "little marsh". Loth "marsh" Beag "little".
