= List of churches in Clackmannanshire =

The council area is divided into civil parishes:

- Alloa (partly in Perthshire until 1891)
- Alva (in Stirlingshire until 1891)
- Clackmannan
- Dollar
- Muckhart (originally in Perthshire; now split between Clackmannanshire and Perth and Kinross)
- Tillicoultry

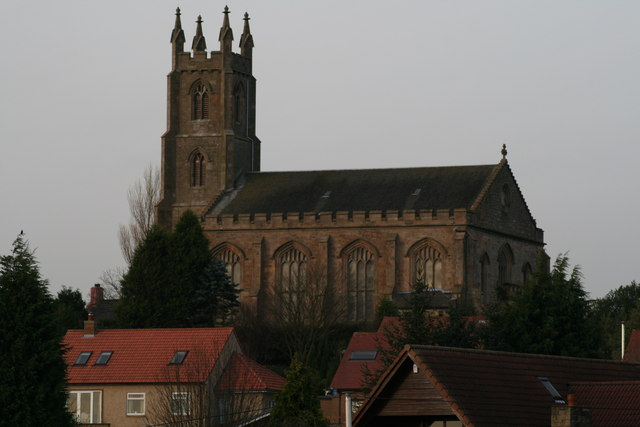
Clackmannan Parish Church

A List of churches in Clackmannanshire, Scotland:

- Clackmannan Parish Church, Clackmannan
- Dollar Parish Church, Dollar
- Hillfoots Evangelical Church, Tillcoultry
- Muckhart Parish Church, Muckhart
- St James the Great Church, Dollar
- St. Mungo's Parish Church, Alloa
- Tullibody Old Kirk, Tullibody
