= List of churches in Aberdeenshire =

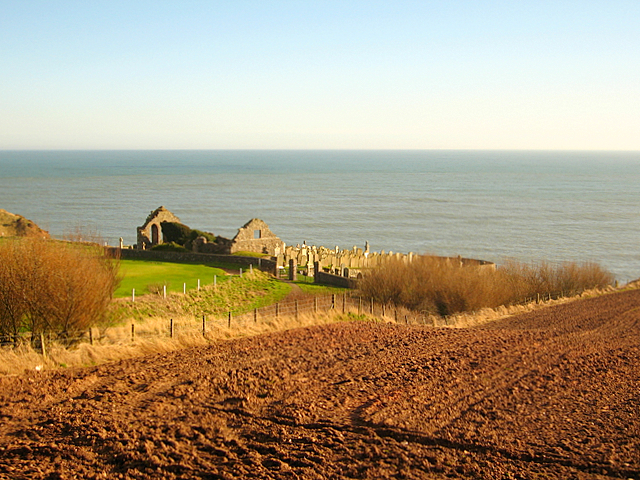
Chapel of St. Mary and St. Nathalan

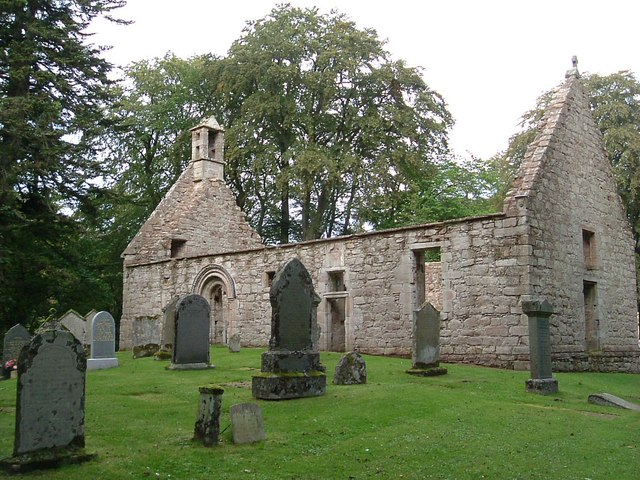
St Mary's Kirk, Auchindoir

A List of churches in Aberdeenshire, Scotland:

- Arbuthnott, Bervie & Kinneff Parish Church
- Blairs College
- Chapel of St. Mary and St. Nathalan
- Christ Church, Kincardine O'Neil
- Cookney Church
- Crathie Kirk
- Crimond Church
- Dunnottar Parish Church
- Fraserburgh Old Parish Church
- St Mary's Chapel, Rattray
- St Mary's Kirk, Auchindoir
- St Ninian's Chapel, Braemar
- St Peter's Church, Aberdeen
- Saint Ternan's Church
- Skene Parish Church
- Udny Parish Church
