= United Presbyterian Church of Canehill =

Historic church in Arkansas, United States

- U.S. National Register of Historic Places
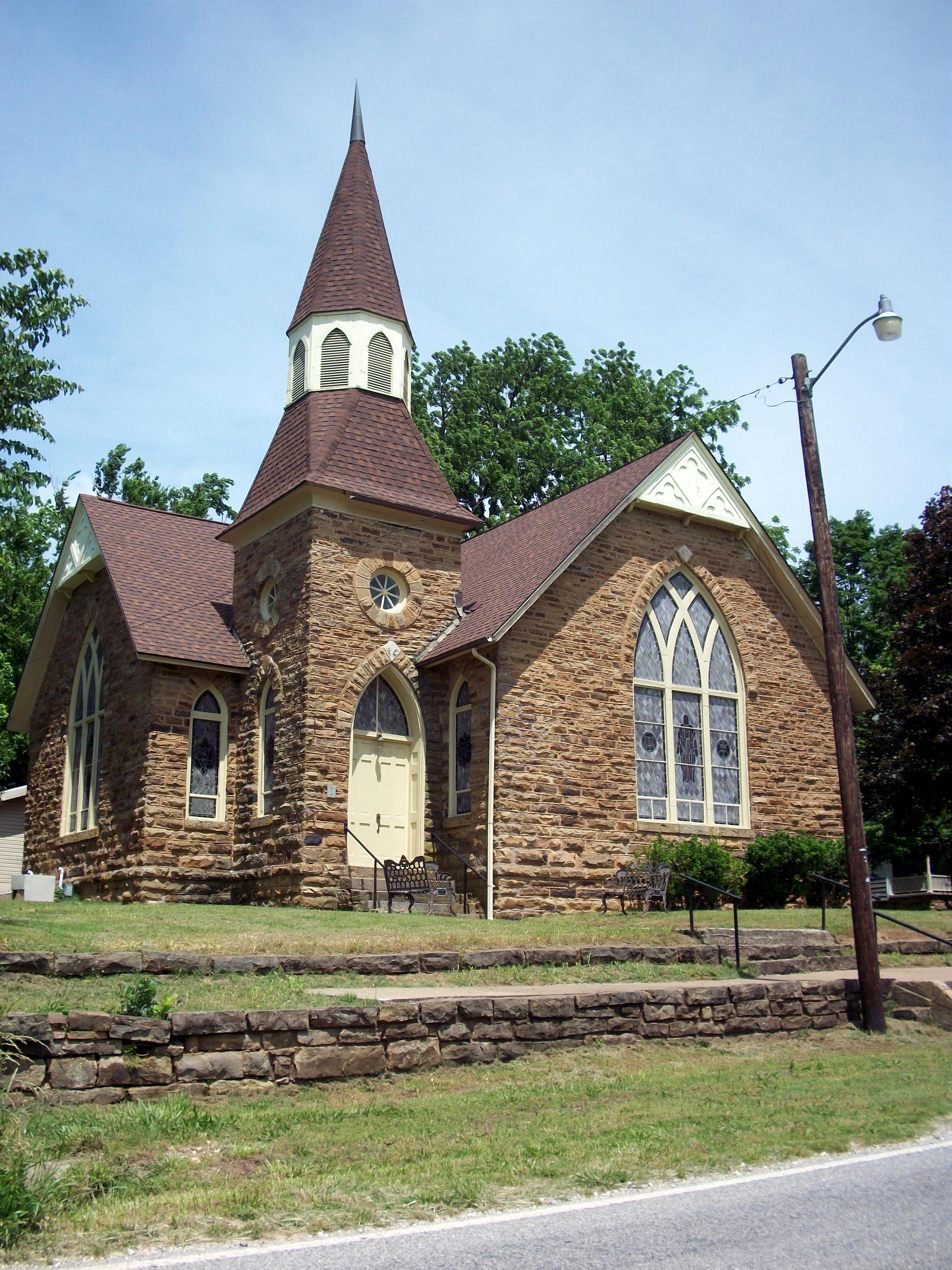

- Location within Arkansas Location within the United States
- Location: 14265 College Road; Canehill, Arkansas
- Coordinates: 35°54′36″N 94°23′46″W
- Area: less than one acre
- Built: 1891
- Architectural style: Late Gothic Revival
- MPS: Canehill MRA
- NRHP reference No.: 82000955
- Added to NRHP: November 17, 1982

The United Presbyterian Church of Canehill is a historic church on Main Street in Canehill, Arkansas. Built in 1891, it is the only surviving church building in the small community. It is a brick structure with a cruciform plan with steeply pitched gable roofs, large Gothic-arched stained glass windows, and a tower with an octagonal belfry topped by a shingled steeple. Canehill was originally settled in 1828 by a Presbyterian group, and eventually supported three separate Presbyterian congregations over the course of the 19th century. These congregations were reunited into this building in 1905.

The building was listed on the National Register of Historic Places in 1982.

== Renovation ==
In 2019, Historic Cane Hill Inc, a local historic preservation non-profit organization, entered a purchase/use agreement with the church. The agreement included a million-dollar renovation to original appearance, including restoring the pine woodwork's oak graining and original light fixtures. The 14 stained glass windows were cleaned and protected from the elements with clear glass. Workers discovered an original window with gothic arch and the original oak doors.

== See also ==
- National Register of Historic Places listings in Washington County, Arkansas
