= Canisbay Parish Church =

Church building in Highland, Scotland

Coordinates: 58°38′19″N 3°07′57″W

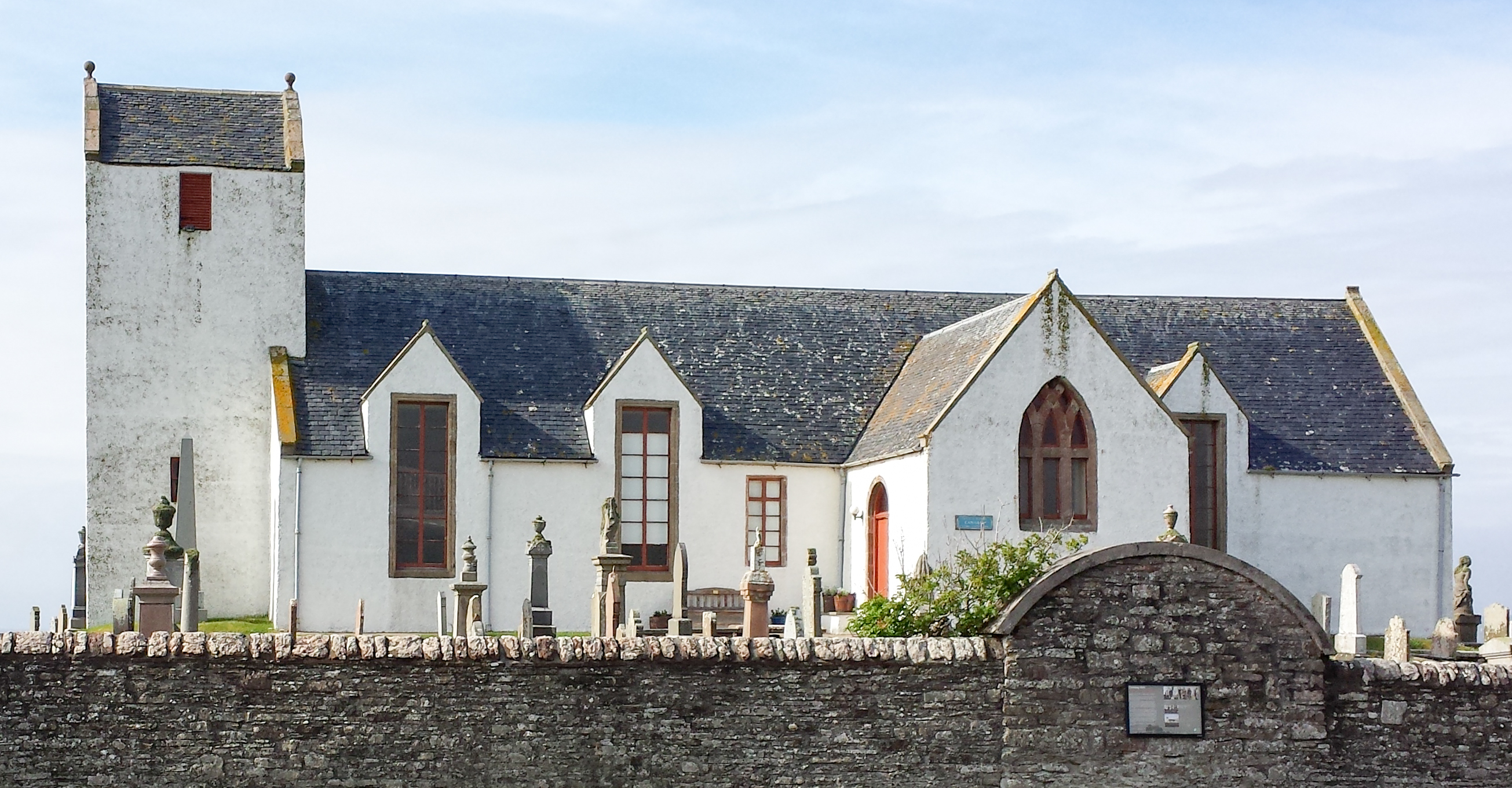
Canisbay Parish Church in 2013

Canisbay Parish Church is a Church of Scotland church in Canisbay, Scotland, that dates back to the early 1600s and is the most northernly church on mainland Britain. It is a Category A listed building. It is surrounded by a large cemetery, which is split into two sections, the new and old. It features a square bell tower, nave and a porch. The porch was added in 1891, when the other extensions and work was completed to the church building.

The church was rebuilt in the 17th century, and ancient remains were discovered after a wall collapsed in the cemetery. Jan De Groot, the man who founded John o' Groats, is buried in Canisbay cemetery; his tombstone sits in the church building and is a popular tourist attraction when the building is open for visitors every summer. The book Lest We Forget: The Parish of Canisbay (1996) is a "miscellany of memories written by parishioners and friends so that future generations can know what made Canisbay a very special place".

Between 1959 and 2001 Queen Elizabeth the Queen Mother was a regular worshipper at the church during her periods of residence, usually in late summer each year, at the nearby Castle of Mey, which she owned.
