= United Presbyterian Church, Thurso =

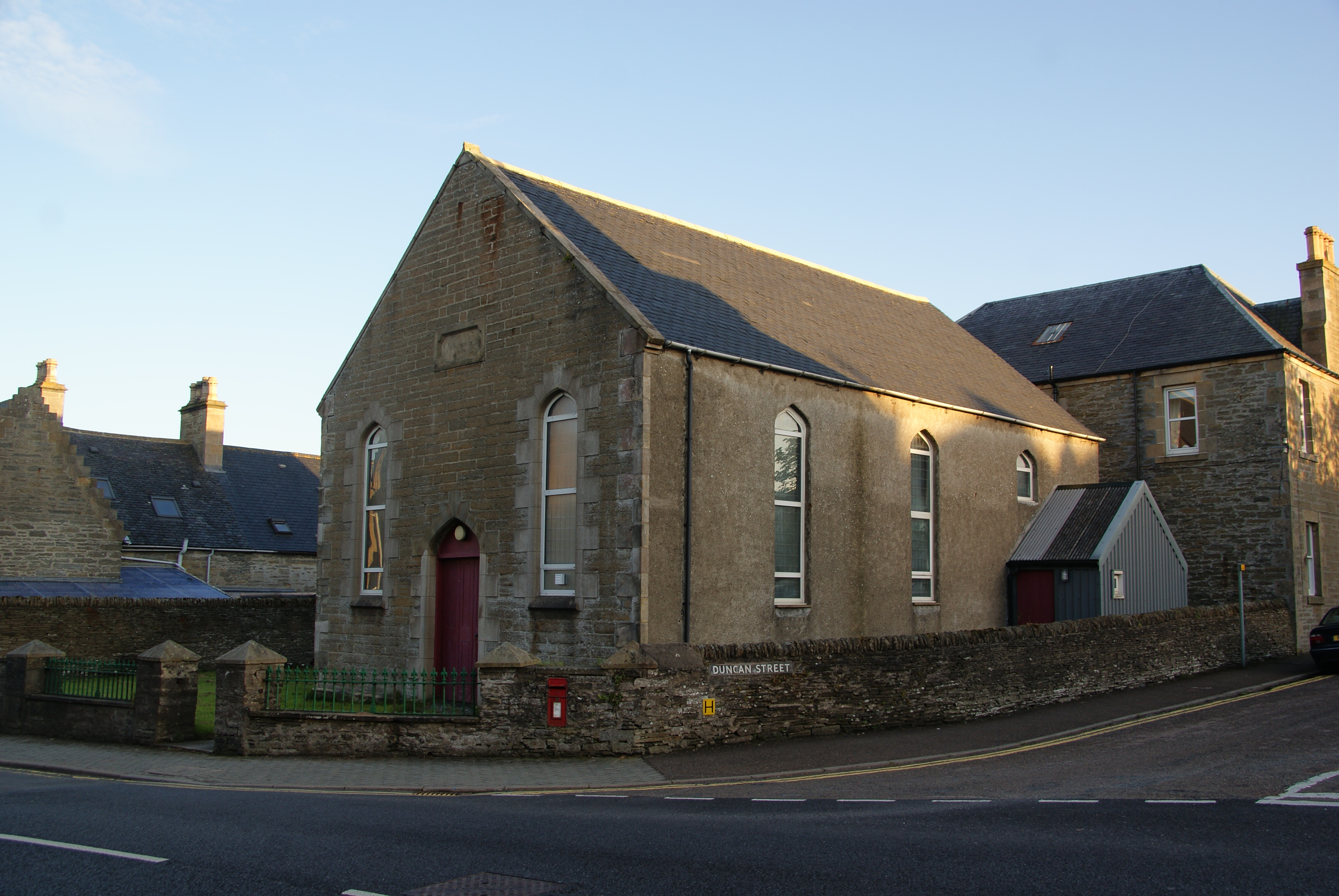
A picture of the church

The United Presbyterian Church, Thurso was a parish church of the United Presbyterian Church of Scotland, now extinct, in Thurso, Caithness. The original church was built in 1777 with seating for 590, and a newer building was erected around 1801.

== History ==
The date of this congregation's origin cannot be stated with exactness. Sir George Sinclair in his evidence before the Patronage Commission put it about 1767. He also stated that "at a previous period two of the parish ministers in succession were understood to have preached Arminian doctrine, in consequence of which a secession had taken place, the necessity of which the inhabitants much regretted." The law papers in the well-known Thurso Case give 1766 as the year. When Elgin Presbytery was formed four years after this Thurso, in conjunction with Wick, was placed as a vacancy under their inspection, and in September of that year a call from Thurso signed by 19 male members and adhered to by other 10 in favour of Alexander Howison was set aside by the Synod. The people had previously petitioned the Presbytery to procure them a hearing of one or more probationers, and in particular two who were learning the Gaelic language, a description which applied to Howison, who was in course of time ordained at Howford. The church built in 1777.

== Ministers ==
Robert Dowie, from Abernethy, was the first minister. He was ordained 11 September 1777, and the first church, with sittings for nearly 600, was built in that year. At the ordination, there were only two ministers present, Mr Buchanan of Nigg, and Mr Clark of Moyness, with the elder from Wick. Before Dowie's death on 11 June 1797, he had been in a declining state of health, but he preached on the previous Sabbath. Having gone to the country during the week he returned on Saturday evening, intending to occupy the pulpit on the following day, but he died next morning about ten o'clock. The Haldanes, who visited Thurso a few months afterwards, stated in their Journal that the state of religion in Thurso was very low, and they were informed that the town, with its 2000 inhabitants, had not been catechised for 40 years.

James Simpson, from St Andrew's Place, Leith, was the second minister. He was ordained 22 April 1801. In the time of this vacancy the church's Old Statistical History reported the membership to be on the decline, and gave their numbers in the town and parish as not more than 70. A new church was erected about the beginning of Simpson's ministry, as appears from the session of the North Church, Perth, having granted a donation to Thurso in 1803 to assist them in rebuilding their place of worship, and this was followed by a further sum of, £20 in 1805. In the minutes of Kirkwall session for 12 August 1802, there is also reference to a petition from Thurso for assistance by collections or otherwise. It represents the repairing and enlargement of their meeting-house as a matter of necessity, and adds that the materials of the old building turned out to be of less value than was estimated. This indicates the date of the second church, which, along with the manse, became the subject of litigation two generations afterwards. Simpson resigned in the early part of 1807, and the case was referred to the Synod, the congregation having petitioned for his continuance among them. The Synod, however, agreed on 4 May to discharge him, and next year he was inducted to Potterrow, Edinburgh. He may have found himself in a discouraging situation at Thurso. Sir George Sinclair stated that in 1804, a minister was ordained over that parish whom the magistrates and the principal inhabitants had petitioned for, and that he officiated there for upwards of twenty years with the greatest acceptance. In 1808, a party in the Anti-Burgher church obtained sermon from the Constitutional or Old Light Presbytery. Dr Scott in his Annals understood that the whole congregation separated from the New Light Synod; but this seems to be a mistake, as Thurso all the while retained its place on the list of Elgin Presbytery.

John M'Donald, who had been loosed from Dubbieside some time before, was the third minister. Inducted, 9 September 1817, M'Donald and his people kept aloof from the Union in September 1820, and in April 1822, Elgin Presbytery reported to the Synod that they had dropped his name from their roll. Distance did not permit him to mingle in the adverse movement, but he acceded to the Protestors. M'Donald died 29 July 1828.

M'Donald's successor was David Burn, who belonged originally to Potterrow Church, Edinburgh (later Hope Park), a congregation with which the family name had a long and honourable connection. Burn attended the United Secession Hall in 1826, and then passed over to the Original Secession. He was ordained at Thurso on 21 July 1831, the stipend promised being only, £70. In 1852, when the Original Secession Synod, of which he was Moderator, decided, by 32 votes to 31, to unite with the Free Church, Thurso congregation at a regular meeting agreed by a majority of one to do the same. The question of legal rights now passed into the Court of Session, and hence arose the Thurso Case, in which it was declared that the property belonged, according to the title-deeds, to the minority, who stood by the binding obligation of the Covenants. Burn and his adherents now vacated the old building, and formed the West Free Church, Thurso. The party who kept by the Original Secession Synod had inevitably to face decline, and in 1884 their membership was down to 50, and the stipend, though liberal for their numbers, was only, £94 with a manse. Burn died, 29 April 1882.
