= Canisbay =

Coordinates: 58.632°N 3.123°W

Canisbay: Scottish Gaelic: Canaispidh; Scots: Canisbay
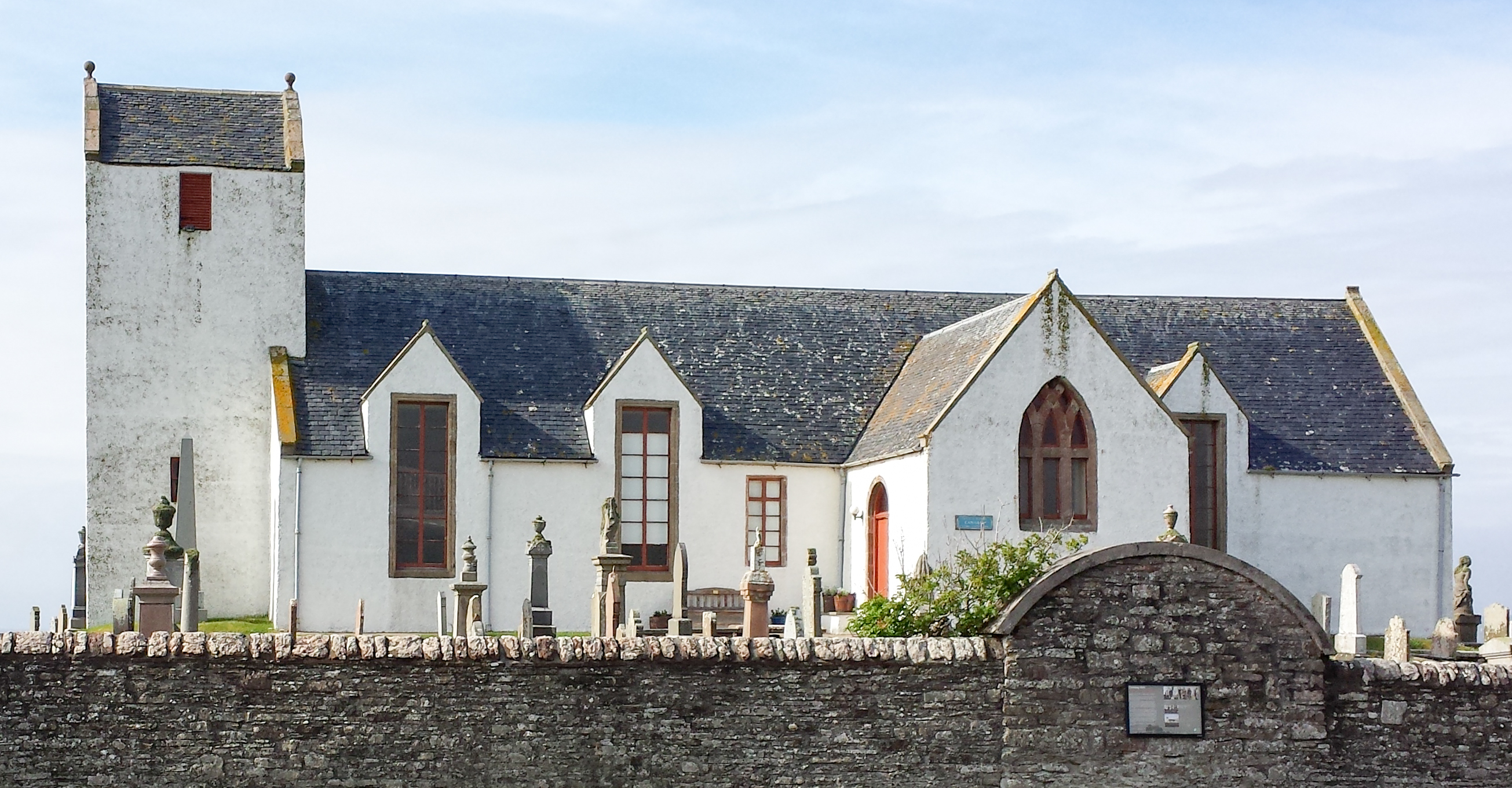
- Canisbay Parish Church

- Location within the Caithness area
- Population: <100
- OS grid reference: ND348721
- Council area: Highland
- Country: Scotland
- Sovereign state: United Kingdom
- Post town: Wick
- Postcode district: KW1 4
- Dialling code: 01955 611
- Police: Scotland
- Fire: Scottish
- Ambulance: Scottish

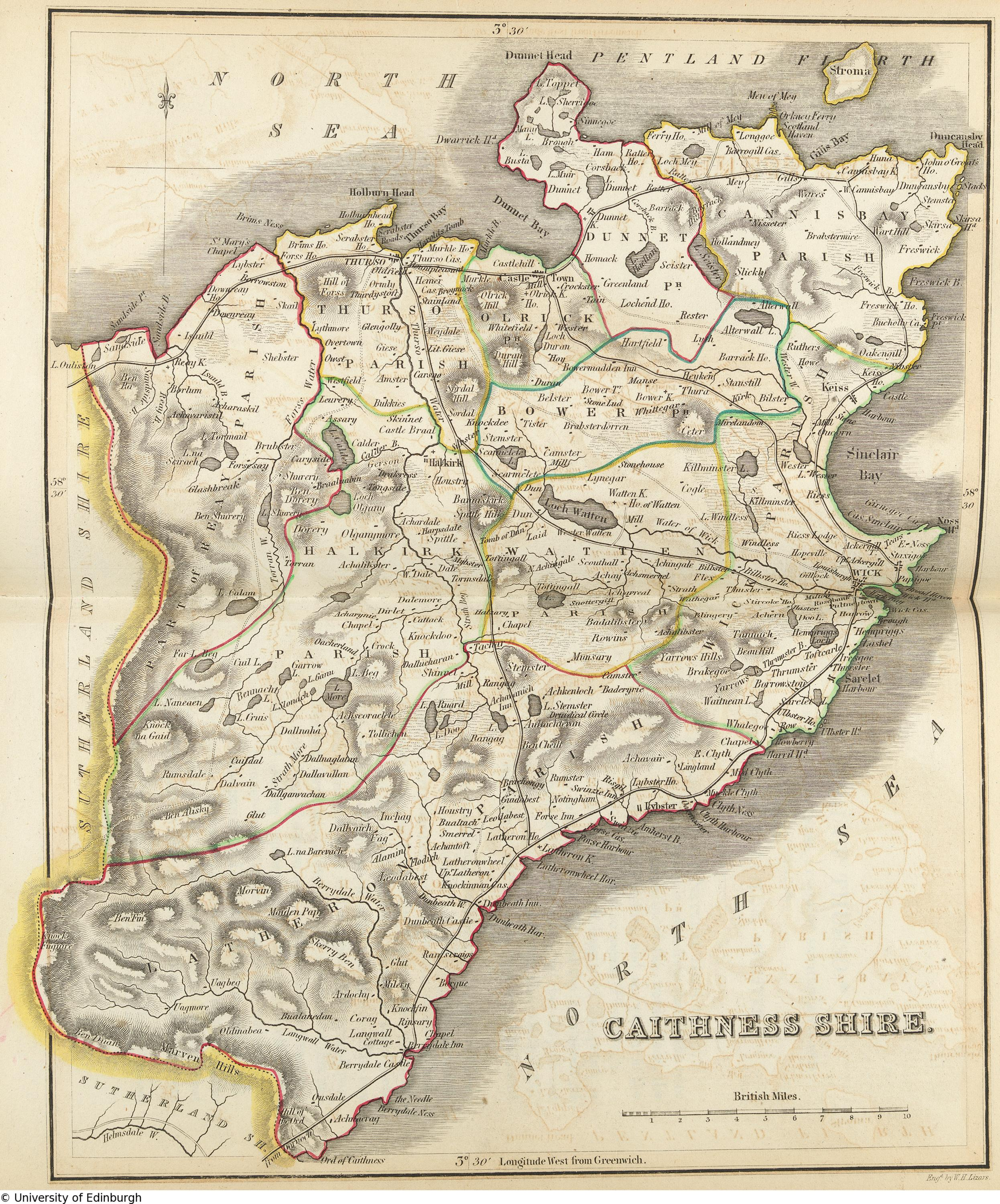
Historical civil parish map

Canisbay is a rural hamlet located about one mile (1.5 kilometres) southwest of Huna and two and a half miles (four kilometres) southwest of John o' Groats in Caithness, Scottish Highlands, and is in the Scottish council area of Highland. It lies on the A836 coast road, which bypasses the hamlet to the north.

It is home to Canisbay Primary School, a Village Hall, Medical Practice, and two Churches, one of which was the church used by Charles III. The Church is also the burial place of Jean De Groot, the ferryman after which John o' Groats is named.

The Parish of Canisbay includes John o' Groats, Upper and Lower Gills, Huna and Freswick.

Canisbay Juniors are the "feeder" team to John o' Groats FC with many of the key first team players having played for the side at one time. They play in the youth development leagues in Caithness where they enter teams at all age groups. It is also home to Canisbay Rifle club, who regularly compete in the Caithness Rifle Leagues.

The Canisbay Show is the local agricultural and crafts show held mid-June each year in the park behind the village hall, with the JCB competition, the karate display and mainly the Beer Tent being the big attractions.
