= List of listed buildings in Inverness =

This is a list of listed buildings in the burgh of Inverness in the Highland council area, Scotland. For listed buildings outwith the burgh, see List of listed buildings in Inverness and Bona.

== List ==
Name	Location	Date listed	Grid ref. (Note: Sometimes known as OSGB36, the grid reference (where provided) is based on the British national grid reference system used by the Ordnance Survey. • "Guide to National Grid". Ordnance Survey. • "Get-a-map". Ordnance Survey.)	Geo-coordinates	Notes	LB number (Note: Historic Environment Scotland assign a unique alphanumeric identifier to each designated site in Scotland, for listed buildings this always begins with "LB", for example "LB12345".)	Image
Ness Walk, Ballifeary House (Home Of Rest)				57°28′07″N 4°13′49″W	Category B	35335	Upload another image
Old Edinburgh Court and Archway At Entrance, Old Edinburgh Road				57°28′07″N 4°12′56″W	Category B	35338	Upload another image
Cameron Barracks, Perth Road				57°28′55″N 4°12′16″W	Category B	35340	Upload another image See more images
Perth Road, Viewfield House				57°28′30″N 4°12′03″W	Category C(S)	35342	Upload Photo
15-45 (Odd Numbers Only) Queensgate				57°28′45″N 4°13′35″W	Category B	35344	Upload Photo
18-30 (Even Numbers Only) Queensgate, 58 And 60 Church Street And 2 Post Office Lane				57°28′45″N 4°13′37″W	Category B	35345	Upload another image
19 And 21 Southside Road				57°28′26″N 4°13′02″W	Category C(S)	35347	Upload Photo
26 Southside Road				57°28′26″N 4°13′04″W	Category B	35350	Upload Photo
46 Southside Road				57°28′19″N 4°13′16″W	Category C(S)	35353	Upload Photo
Stratherrick Road, Drummond Tower				57°27′33″N 4°14′06″W	Category B	35358	Upload Photo
1-17 (Odd Numbers Only) Union Street				57°28′44″N 4°13′28″W	Category B	35366	Upload Photo
3 And 4 Viewplace And 2 And 4 Culduthel Road				57°28′30″N 4°13′31″W	Category C(S)	35373	Upload Photo
2 Dores Road, The Firs, And Garden Wall				57°27′32″N 4°14′19″W	Category B	35216	Upload Photo
21 Douglas Row				57°28′48″N 4°13′49″W	Category B	35234	Upload Photo
2 And 4 Grant Street And 1 Anderson Street				57°29′04″N 4°13′59″W	Category B	35247	Upload Photo
63 Haugh Road				57°28′21″N 4°13′35″W	Category C(S)	35249	Upload Photo
1, 3, 5 And 7 High Street				57°28′40″N 4°13′31″W	Category B	35250	Upload Photo
17 And 19 High Street				57°28′40″N 4°13′29″W	Category B	35252	Upload Photo
21 And 23 High Street And 1-21 (Odd Numbers Only) Lombard Street, And Baron Taylor's Street				57°28′41″N 4°13′28″W	Category B	35253	Upload another image
Town House, High Street				57°28′38″N 4°13′30″W	Category A	35260	Upload another image See more images
2 Hill Place				57°28′40″N 4°13′21″W	Category B	35262	Upload another image
5 Huntly Place				57°28′55″N 4°14′07″W	Category B	35266	Upload Photo
41-44 Huntly Street (All Numbers)				57°28′45″N 4°13′53″W	Category B	35278	Upload another image
20 Island Bank Road, Maybank				57°27′48″N 4°13′46″W	Category C(S)	35296	Upload Photo
78 King Street				57°28′45″N 4°14′00″W	Category C(S)	35301	Upload Photo
Crown Primary School, Kingmills Road				57°28′37″N 4°13′03″W	Category B	35302	Upload another image
3 Moray Park, Island Bank Road				57°28′16″N 4°13′37″W	Category B	35316	Upload Photo
1, 1A, 1B And 3 Muirtown Street				57°28′44″N 4°14′01″W	Category C(S)	35317	Upload Photo
5, 6 And 7 Ness Bank				57°28′27″N 4°13′34″W	Category C(S)	35320	Upload Photo
11 And 12 Ardross Street				57°28′30″N 4°13′50″W	Category C(S)	35136	Upload Photo
16 Ardross Street				57°28′29″N 4°13′55″W	Category B	35140	Upload Photo
7 And 8 Ardross Terrace				57°28′32″N 4°13′41″W	Category B	35146	Upload Photo
9 And 10 Ardross Terrace				57°28′33″N 4°13′42″W	Category B	35147	Upload another image
1 Ballifeary Road And 15 Bishop's Road				57°28′19″N 4°14′02″W	Category C(S)	35148	Upload Photo
9 And 11 Bank Lane And Bank Street, Inverness Courier Office				57°28′40″N 4°13′37″W	Category B	35149	Upload Photo
33, 33A, 33B And 35 Castle Street				57°28′37″N 4°13′26″W	Category B	35159	Upload Photo
51-53 (Odd Nos Only) Castle Street				57°28′36″N 4°13′27″W	Category B	35163	Upload Photo
99 Castle Street				57°28′31″N 4°13′29″W	Category B	35164	Upload Photo
16 Celt Street				57°28′46″N 4°14′02″W	Category C(S)	35168	Upload Photo
Robertson Mausoleum, Old High Churchyard, Church Street				57°28′48″N 4°13′43″W	Category B	35180	Upload another image
115 Church Street				57°28′49″N 4°13′42″W	Category B	35181	Upload another image
Clachnaharry Road, Canal Workshops, Clachnaharry Lock				57°29′19″N 4°15′19″W	Category B	35191	Upload another image
Culduthel Road, Hedgefield Hostel And Stable Block, Walled Garden				57°28′10″N 4°13′09″W	Category B	35200	Upload another image
Academy Street, Union Street, Church Street And Queensgate, Market Arcade And New Market				57°28′45″N 4°13′29″W	Category B	35118	Upload another image See more images
92 And 94 Academy Street				57°28′49″N 4°13′36″W	Category B	35124	Upload Photo
East Parish Church, Academy Street				57°28′49″N 4°13′33″W	Category B	35125	Upload another image See more images
1-10 (Inclusive Numbers) And 12 Victoria Terrace				57°28′51″N 4°12′45″W	Category C(S)	47971	Upload Photo
Academy Street, Inverness Station, Lochgorm Works				57°28′53″N 4°13′16″W	Category B	50928	Upload Photo
1 Grant Street, Argyle Bar				57°29′03″N 4°14′00″W	Category C(S)	43489	Upload Photo
Cathedral Church Of St Andrew (Episcopal), Ness Walk				57°28′28″N 4°13′45″W	Category A	35330	Upload another image See more images
Ness Walk, Royal Northern Infirmary, Former Nurses' Home				57°28′17″N 4°13′49″W	Category B	35333	Upload another image
Ness Walk, And Ballifeary Lane, Springfield Hotel				57°28′11″N 4°13′51″W	Category B	35334	Upload Photo
Old Edinburgh Road, Lamburn				57°27′28″N 4°13′07″W	Category C(S)	35337	Upload Photo
48 Southside Road				57°28′19″N 4°13′17″W	Category C(S)	35354	Upload Photo
Telford Road, Merkinch Primary School, School House And Retaining Railings				57°29′00″N 4°14′21″W	Category B	35363	Upload Photo
21-39 Union Street (Odd Numbers Only), 2 Drummond Street And 24 Church Street Douglas Hotel				57°28′43″N 4°13′31″W	Category B	35368	Upload Photo
38-46 (Even Numbers Only) Union Street				57°28′44″N 4°13′34″W	Category B	35370	Upload Photo
50 Union Street And 26 Church Street Bank Of Scotland				57°28′43″N 4°13′34″W	Category B	35371	Upload Photo
5 And 6 Viewplace And Garden Wall				57°28′29″N 4°13′31″W	Category B	35374	Upload Photo
4 Wells Street				57°28′51″N 4°14′05″W	Category C(S)	35386	Upload Photo
13-19 (Odd Numbers Only) Young Street				57°28′35″N 4°13′44″W	Category C(S)	35389	Upload another image
20 Douglas Row				57°28′48″N 4°13′49″W	Category B	35233	Upload Photo
22 And 23 Douglas Row				57°28′48″N 4°13′48″W	Category B	35235	Upload Photo
3 Huntly Place				57°28′54″N 4°14′07″W	Category B	35264	Upload Photo
16 And 17 Huntly Street				57°28′39″N 4°13′45″W	Category B	35270	Upload Photo
Huntly Street, Former Queen Street Church				57°28′44″N 4°13′54″W	Category C(S)	35277	Upload another image
21 Island Bank Road, Ach-An-Eas				57°27′53″N 4°13′38″W	Category C(S)	35291	Upload Photo
Former Farraline Park School (Inverness Public Library), Margaret Street				57°28′52″N 4°13′28″W	Category A	35311	Upload another image See more images
60 (Maryfield) And 62 Midmills Road				57°28′37″N 4°12′36″W	Category B	35313	Upload Photo
12 Muirtown Street				57°28′47″N 4°14′05″W	Category C(S)	35318	Upload Photo
14 Ness Bank, Struan				57°28′25″N 4°13′36″W	Category C(S)	35323	Upload Photo
38, 40, 42 And 44 Academy Street				57°28′47″N 4°13′30″W	Category C(S)	35126	Upload Photo
28-34 (Even Nos Only) Academy Street				57°28′46″N 4°13′28″W	Category A	35127	Upload another image See more images
1-9 Ardross Street (All Numbers)				57°28′30″N 4°13′47″W	Category B	35134	Upload another image
13 Ardross Street				57°28′30″N 4°13′51″W	Category C(S)	35137	Upload Photo
1 Bishop's Road				57°28′21″N 4°13′48″W	Category B	35152	Upload Photo
4-14 (Even Nos Only) Bridge Street				57°28′39″N 4°13′34″W	Category B	35154	Upload Photo
27 Broadstone Park Oakdene				57°28′38″N 4°12′48″W	Category B	35155	Upload Photo
101 And 103 Castle Street				57°28′31″N 4°13′30″W	Category C(S)	35165	Upload Photo
105, 107 Church Street				57°28′48″N 4°13′41″W	Category C(S)	35176	Upload another image
Dunbar's Hospital, 86 and 88 Church Street				57°28′48″N 4°13′40″W	Category A	35184	Upload another image See more images
84 Church Street Bow Court				57°28′47″N 4°13′39″W	Category B	35185	Upload Photo
82 Church Street				57°28′47″N 4°13′39″W	Category B	35186	Upload Photo
12 And 14 Crown Avenue, Crown House				57°28′43″N 4°13′08″W	Category B	35194	Upload Photo
99-107 (Odd Numbers Only) Academy Street				57°28′50″N 4°13′41″W	Category B	35120	Upload Photo
1-11 (Odd Nos) Tomnahurich Street				57°28′35″N 4°13′46″W	Category C(S)	46542	Upload Photo
Clan Battle Monument, Clachnaharry				57°29′17″N 4°15′40″W	Category C(S)	48262	Upload another image See more images
Mackintosh Road, RAF Filter Block (The Bunker)				57°28′53″N 4°11′56″W	Category B	49181	Upload Photo
Mayfield Road, The Isobel Fraser Home Of Rest				57°28′21″N 4°13′19″W	Category B	43490	Upload Photo
1 To 6 (Inclusive Nos) Ness Walk And 1 And 3 Young Street				57°28′35″N 4°13′42″W	Category B	35327	Upload another image
Eden Court (former Bishop's Palace only), Ness Walk				57°28′24″N 4°13′51″W	Category B	35331	Upload another image See more images
Old Mill Lane, Culcabock House				57°28′05″N 4°12′20″W	Category B	35339	Upload Photo
Drakies House, Perth Road and Culcabock Avenue				57°28′14″N 4°11′58″W	Category B	35341	Upload another image
Stratherrick Road, Lodge, Drummond Hill				57°27′28″N 4°13′59″W	Category B	35360	Upload Photo
Stratherrick Road, Bellevue				57°27′33″N 4°13′54″W	Category B	35361	Upload Photo
24-38 (Even Numbers Only) Telford Street				57°28′51″N 4°14′23″W	Category B	35365	Upload Photo
19 Union Street, And 1-9 (Odd Numbers Only) Drummond Street, Royal Bank Of Scotland				57°28′43″N 4°13′30″W	Category B	35367	Upload Photo
10-24 (Even Numbers Only), Union Street				57°28′44″N 4°13′30″W	Category B	35369	Upload Photo
1 And 2 Viewplace And Castle Street And Culduthel Road				57°28′30″N 4°13′31″W	Category C(S)	35372	Upload another image
44 Wells Street				57°28′49″N 4°14′12″W	Category C(S)	35377	Upload Photo
40 Wells Street				57°28′49″N 4°14′12″W	Category C(S)	35379	Upload Photo
22 Culduthel Road, Heatherly House				57°28′11″N 4°13′26″W	Category B	35210	Upload Photo
18 Culduthel Road				57°28′15″N 4°13′26″W	Category B	35212	Upload Photo
10 Douglas Row				57°28′50″N 4°13′53″W	Category B	35223	Upload Photo
14 Douglas Row				57°28′49″N 4°13′51″W	Category B	35227	Upload Photo
4 Eastgate				57°28′41″N 4°13′21″W	Category C(S)	35241	Upload Photo
28 And 30 High Street				57°28′39″N 4°13′26″W	Category B	35257	Upload Photo
St Mary's RC Presbytery, 30 Huntly Street				57°28′40″N 4°13′47″W	Category B	35271	Upload Photo
St Mary's RC Church, Huntly Street				57°28′40″N 4°13′48″W	Category A	35272	Upload another image
Balnain House, Huntly Street				57°28′44″N 4°13′52″W	Category A	35276	Upload another image
15 Island Bank Road				57°27′57″N 4°13′35″W	Category C(S)	35288	Upload Photo
4 Ladies Walk				57°28′11″N 4°13′40″W	Category B	35305	Upload Photo
Inverness High School, Off Montague Row				57°28′33″N 4°14′15″W	Category B	35314	Upload another image
10 Ness Bank (Including Former Number 12 Ness Bank)				57°28′26″N 4°13′35″W	Category C(S)	35321	Upload Photo
16, 17 And 18 Ness Bank				57°28′24″N 4°13′37″W	Category B	35325	Upload Photo
8 And 10 Academy Street				57°28′45″N 4°13′24″W	Category C(S)	35130	Upload Photo
7A,9-13 Ardconnel Terrace (Odd Nos)And 1-6 (Inclusive) Tulloch Buildings				57°28′40″N 4°13′16″W	Category B	35133	Upload Photo
1-6 (All Nos) Ardross Terrace				57°28′30″N 4°13′43″W	Category B	35145	Upload another image
Free North Church, Bank Street				57°28′46″N 4°13′43″W	Category B	35151	Upload another image See more images
41 And 45 Castle Street				57°28′36″N 4°13′27″W	Category B	35161	Upload Photo
Sheriff Court and Police Station (Inverness Castle), Castle Hill, Castle Wynd				57°28′34″N 4°13′32″W	Category A	35166	Upload another image See more images
109 Church Street				57°28′48″N 4°13′42″W	Category B	35177	Upload Photo
Old High Church, Church Street				57°28′49″N 4°13′44″W	Category A	35179	Upload another image See more images
87 Culduthel Road Cluny House				57°27′51″N 4°12′59″W	Category B	35202	Upload Photo
145 Culduthel Road				57°27′28″N 4°13′12″W	Category B	35205	Upload Photo
Rose Street Foundry offices, 96-104 (Even Numbers Only) Academy Street and 2 Rose Street				57°28′50″N 4°13′38″W	Category B	35123	Upload another image
Clachnaharry Swing Bridge and Signal Box				57°29′22″N 4°15′23″W	Category B	46540	Upload another image See more images
20 Baron Taylor's Street				57°28′42″N 4°13′29″W	Category C(S)	46541	Upload Photo
Viewhill (Former Inverness Youth Hostel), including gateways, gatepiers and boundary walls, 1 Old Edinburgh Road at Gordon Terrace				57°28′29″N 4°13′27″W	Category B	47604	Upload another image
26 Oak Avenue (Old Drummond)				57°27′41″N 4°13′31″W	Category B	35336	Upload Photo
32 Wells Street				57°28′50″N 4°14′10″W	Category C(S)	35383	Upload Photo
16 Douglas Row				57°28′49″N 4°13′50″W	Category B	35229	Upload Photo
28 Friars' Lane				57°28′48″N 4°13′47″W	Category B	35245	Upload Photo
54-60 (Even Numbers Only) High Street				57°28′47″N 4°13′24″W	Category A	35259	Upload another image See more images
8 And 9 Huntly Place				57°28′56″N 4°14′07″W	Category B	35267	Upload Photo
45-48 Huntly Street (All Numbers)				57°28′45″N 4°13′55″W	Category B	35279	Upload Photo
27 Island Bank Road				57°27′43″N 4°13′49″W	Category C(S)	35292	Upload Photo
42 And 44 Island Bank Road				57°27′38″N 4°14′02″W	Category C(S)	35297	Upload Photo
Ladies Walk, War Memorial				57°28′16″N 4°13′41″W	Category C(S)	35309	Upload Photo
1 And 3 Market Brae				57°28′41″N 4°13′21″W	Category B	35312	Upload Photo
2 Moray Park, Island Bank				57°28′16″N 4°13′37″W	Category B	35315	Upload Photo
12 Ness Bank (Formerly Number 13 Ness Bank)				57°28′25″N 4°13′36″W	Category C(S)	35322	Upload Photo
Academy Street, Monument To 79th Queen`s Own Cameron Highlanders Killed In Egypt And The Sudan(1882-1887)				57°28′45″N 4°13′27″W	Category C(S)	35128	Upload another image See more images
13 Annfield Road, Lethington				57°28′20″N 4°12′44″W	Category B	35132	Upload Photo
15 Ardross Street				57°28′29″N 4°13′54″W	Category B	35139	Upload Photo
18 Ardross Street				57°28′29″N 4°13′57″W	Category C(S)	35142	Upload Photo
47 And 49 Castle Street				57°28′36″N 4°13′26″W	Category B	35162	Upload Photo
Statue of Flora Macdonald, Castle Hill, Castle Wynd				57°28′33″N 4°13′32″W	Category C(S)	35167	Upload another image See more images
24 (Ironside) And 26 Crown Drive				57°28′48″N 4°12′50″W	Category B	35195	Upload Photo
5 Culduthel Road Ardkeen Tower				57°28′27″N 4°13′28″W	Category B	35196	Upload another image
Culduthel Road, Altnaskiach House				57°28′02″N 4°13′28″W	Category B	35201	Upload Photo
89 Culduthel Road				57°27′49″N 4°13′00″W	Category B	35203	Upload Photo
135 Culduthel Road				57°27′33″N 4°13′09″W	Category B	35204	Upload Photo
68 Culduthel Road				57°27′55″N 4°13′00″W	Category B	35206	Upload Photo
48 Culduthel Road				57°27′59″N 4°13′07″W	Category B	35207	Upload Photo
1-9 (Odd Numbers Only) Academy Street				57°28′44″N 4°13′26″W	Category B	35116	Upload Photo
91-97 (Odd Numbers Only) Academy Street				57°28′50″N 4°13′41″W	Category B	35119	Upload Photo
106, 108, 110 Academy Street And 1, 3, And 5 Rose Street (The Phoenix Bar)				57°28′51″N 4°13′39″W	Category B	35122	Upload Photo
60-66 Academy Street				57°28′48″N 4°13′32″W	Category B	43639	Upload another image
Ivybank, 28 Old Edinburgh Road				57°28′25″N 4°13′15″W	Category B	43640	Upload Photo
Ness Walk, Royal Northern Infirmary And Tweedmouth Memorial Chapel				57°28′15″N 4°13′51″W	Category B	35332	Upload another image
2-10 (Even Numbers Only) Queensgate				57°28′47″N 4°13′34″W	Category B	35346	Upload Photo
Stephen's Street, Royal Academy				57°28′40″N 4°13′06″W	Category B	35355	Upload Photo
Stratherrick Road, Lochardil Hotel				57°27′22″N 4°14′03″W	Category B	35356	Upload another image
Stratherrick Road, Drummond Hill				57°27′32″N 4°13′58″W	Category B	35359	Upload Photo
10 And 11 Viewplace				57°28′28″N 4°13′31″W	Category C(S)	35376	Upload another image
34 Wells Street				57°28′50″N 4°14′11″W	Category C(S)	35382	Upload Photo
8 Wells Street				57°28′51″N 4°14′06″W	Category C(S)	35385	Upload Photo
20 Culduthel Road Beechlawn				57°28′14″N 4°13′25″W	Category B	35211	Upload Photo
3 Douglas Row				57°28′51″N 4°13′54″W	Category B	35218	Upload Photo
13 Douglas Row				57°28′50″N 4°13′51″W	Category B	35226	Upload Photo
24 Douglas Row				57°28′48″N 4°13′48″W	Category B	35236	Upload Photo
3 Drummond Crescent				57°27′50″N 4°13′37″W	Category B	35238	Upload Photo
13 Drummond Crescent (Brae Rannoch) And Cottage				57°27′40″N 4°13′41″W	Category B	35240	Upload Photo
49 Huntly Street				57°28′46″N 4°13′56″W	Category C(S)	35280	Upload Photo
2 Inglis Street And 4 Inglis Street				57°28′42″N 4°13′22″W	Category B	35282	Upload another image
13 Island Bank Road, Woodfield				57°28′00″N 4°13′34″W	Category C(S)	35287	Upload Photo
17 Island Bank Road, Riverdale				57°27′56″N 4°13′36″W	Category B	35289	Upload Photo
31 Island Bank Road, Rossal				57°27′41″N 4°13′50″W	Category B	35294	Upload Photo
12 Huntly Place, (Formerly Known As 78 Kessock Street Upper)				57°28′57″N 4°14′07″W	Category C(S)	35300	Upload Photo
2 Ladies Walk				57°28′12″N 4°13′40″W	Category C(S)	35303	Upload Photo
Ladies Walk, Forbes Fountain				57°28′09″N 4°13′39″W	Category C(S)	35310	Upload Photo
15 Ness Bank				57°28′25″N 4°13′36″W	Category C(S)	35324	Upload Photo
14 Ardross Street				57°28′30″N 4°13′53″W	Category B	35138	Upload Photo
17 Ardross Street				57°28′29″N 4°13′56″W	Category C(S)	35141	Upload Photo
19 Ardross Street				57°28′29″N 4°13′58″W	Category C(S)	35143	Upload Photo
Bank Street And Fraser Street, St Columba High Church				57°28′43″N 4°13′39″W	Category B	35150	Upload another image See more images
Thistle Inn, Celt Street				57°28′46″N 4°14′01″W	Category C(S)	35169	Upload another image
43, 45, 47 Church Street				57°28′42″N 4°13′36″W	Category B	35173	Upload Photo
Abertarff House, 71 Church Street				57°28′45″N 4°13′39″W	Category B	35175	Upload Photo
Clachnaharry Road Tollhouse				57°29′06″N 4°15′06″W	Category B	35188	Upload another image
Lock-Keeper's House And Store at Clachnaharry Sea Lock, Off Clachnaharry Road				57°29′25″N 4°15′46″W	Category B	35190	Upload another image See more images
Cromwell Road, Clock Tower				57°29′17″N 4°13′46″W	Category B	35193	Upload another image
9 Culduthel Road				57°28′23″N 4°13′25″W	Category C(S)	35198	Upload another image
15 Academy Street				57°28′45″N 4°13′28″W	Category B	35117	Upload another image
Ness Walk, Royal Northern Infirmary, Porter's Lodge				57°28′17″N 4°13′48″W	Category C(S)	46408	Upload another image
Ardross Street, Northern Meeting Park Pavilion Building And Boundary Walls				57°28′29″N 4°13′51″W	Category B	51129	Upload Photo
42 Southside Road				57°28′20″N 4°13′13″W	Category C(S)	35351	Upload Photo
44 Southside Road				57°28′20″N 4°13′14″W	Category C(S)	35352	Upload Photo
14 Culduthel Road				57°28′18″N 4°13′26″W	Category B	35214	Upload Photo
2 Douglas Row				57°28′51″N 4°13′55″W	Category B	35217	Upload Photo
4 Douglas Row				57°28′51″N 4°13′54″W	Category B	35219	Upload Photo
5 Douglas Row				57°28′51″N 4°13′54″W	Category B	35220	Upload Photo
2 Drummond Crescent, Rosedene				57°27′50″N 4°13′41″W	Category B	35237	Upload Photo
51-57 Grant Street (Odd Numbers Only)				57°29′05″N 4°14′08″W	Category B	35246	Upload Photo
Bank of Scotland (former Caledonian Bank head office), 9 and 11 High Street				57°28′40″N 4°13′30″W	Category A	35251	Upload another image See more images
10 Huntly Place				57°28′56″N 4°14′07″W	Category C(S)	35268	Upload Photo
Huntly Street, West Parish Church				57°28′42″N 4°13′51″W	Category B	35275	Upload Photo
Infirmary Bridge (Bridge From Ness Walk - Ness Bank)				57°28′18″N 4°13′44″W	Category B	35281	Upload another image See more images
19 Island Bank Road				57°27′54″N 4°13′37″W	Category C(S)	35290	Upload Photo
1 Ladies Walk, Eileanach				57°28′14″N 4°13′40″W	Category B	35295	Upload Photo
1A And 3 Annfield Road				57°28′23″N 4°12′59″W	Category B	35131	Upload Photo
Ardross Street, Highland Regional Council Buildings				57°28′27″N 4°13′59″W	Category C(S)	35144	Upload another image
37 And 39 Castle Street				57°28′37″N 4°13′26″W	Category B	35160	Upload Photo
92 And 94 Church Street				57°28′49″N 4°13′41″W	Category C(S)	35183	Upload Photo
Clachnaharry Road, Muirtown Cottage				57°29′01″N 4°14′56″W	Category B	35187	Upload Photo
Clachnaharry Road 1 And 3 High Street				57°29′19″N 4°15′24″W	Category B	35192	Upload Photo
24 Culduthel Road, Inglewood				57°28′11″N 4°13′25″W	Category C(S)	35209	Upload Photo
30, 32, 34 Grant Street, Grant Street Welfare Hall				57°29′05″N 4°14′03″W	Category C(S)	43488	Upload Photo
Ness Walk Columba Hotel				57°28′35″N 4°13′43″W	Category B	35328	Upload another image See more images
Ness Walk Palace Hotel				57°28′33″N 4°13′41″W	Category B	35329	Upload another image See more images
St Stephen's Church, Southside Road				57°28′23″N 4°13′08″W	Category B	35349	Upload another image See more images
Stratherrick Road, Lodge, Lochardil Hotel				57°27′28″N 4°13′56″W	Category C(S)	35357	Upload Photo
Stratherrick Road, Westwood				57°27′34″N 4°13′50″W	Category B	35362	Upload Photo
7 And 8 Viewplace And Garden Wall				57°28′29″N 4°13′31″W	Category B	35375	Upload Photo
36 Wells Street				57°28′50″N 4°14′11″W	Category C(S)	35381	Upload Photo
30 Wells Street				57°28′50″N 4°14′10″W	Category C(S)	35384	Upload Photo
South Kessock, Thornbush Quay, Sheer Legs				57°29′22″N 4°14′14″W	Category B	35390	Upload Photo
16 Culduthel Road				57°28′16″N 4°13′26″W	Category B	35213	Upload Photo
8 Douglas Row				57°28′50″N 4°13′53″W	Category B	35221	Upload Photo
9 Douglas Row				57°28′50″N 4°13′53″W	Category B	35222	Upload Photo
11 Douglas Row				57°28′50″N 4°13′52″W	Category B	35224	Upload Photo
12 Douglas Row				57°28′50″N 4°13′52″W	Category B	35225	Upload Photo
17 Douglas Row				57°28′49″N 4°13′50″W	Category B	35230	Upload Photo
39 High Street				57°28′41″N 4°13′26″W	Category B	35254	Upload another image
41 High Street				57°28′41″N 4°13′25″W	Category B	35255	Upload Photo
32 And 34 High Street				57°28′40″N 4°13′26″W	Category B	35256	Upload Photo
26 High Street				57°28′40″N 4°13′26″W	Category B	35258	Upload Photo
Market Cross, High Street				57°28′39″N 4°13′30″W	Category B	35261	Upload another image See more images
36 Huntly Street				57°28′42″N 4°13′50″W	Category B	35274	Upload another image
14 And 16 Inglis Street				57°28′43″N 4°13′23″W	Category C(S)	35285	Upload Photo
11 Island Bank Road				57°28′03″N 4°13′36″W	Category B	35286	Upload Photo
7 Ladies Walk				57°28′09″N 4°13′39″W	Category B	35308	Upload Photo
Ness Bank Church, Ness Bank and Haugh Road				57°28′28″N 4°13′34″W	Category C(S)	35319	Upload another image See more images
Royal Highland Hotel, 18 Academy Street				57°28′46″N 4°13′24″W	Category B	35129	Upload another image See more images
Charleston Place Muirtown House				57°29′01″N 4°15′11″W	Category B	35171	Upload another image
67 Church Street				57°28′45″N 4°13′39″W	Category B	35174	Upload Photo
111 Church Street				57°28′48″N 4°13′42″W	Category B	35178	Upload Photo
Church Street, Greyfriars Free Church				57°28′49″N 4°13′43″W	Category B	35182	Upload Photo
Clachnaharry Road Dunolly				57°29′21″N 4°15′25″W	Category B	35189	Upload another image
26 Culduthel Road				57°28′12″N 4°13′22″W	Category B	35208	Upload Photo
28 Abban Street, St Michael And All Angels Episcopal Church Rectory With Boundary Walls				57°28′54″N 4°14′15″W	Category B	35115	Upload Photo
20 Ness Bank				57°28′22″N 4°13′38″W	Category C(S)	35326	Upload Photo
1-13 (Odd Numbers Only) Queensgate And 33 Academy Street				57°28′46″N 4°13′32″W	Category B	35343	Upload Photo
37 Southside Road				57°28′17″N 4°13′12″W	Category B	35348	Upload Photo
60 Telford Street And Outbuilding And Garden Wall				57°28′54″N 4°14′34″W	Category B	35364	Upload Photo
42 Wells Street				57°28′50″N 4°14′12″W	Category C(S)	35378	Upload Photo
38 Wells Street				57°28′50″N 4°14′12″W	Category C(S)	35380	Upload Photo
5 And 7 Young Street				57°28′36″N 4°13′43″W	Category C(S)	35387	Upload Photo
9 And 11 Young Street				57°28′36″N 4°13′44″W	Category C(S)	35388	Upload Photo
10 Culduthel Road, Viewmount				57°28′24″N 4°13′29″W	Category B	35215	Upload Photo
15 Douglas Row				57°28′49″N 4°13′51″W	Category B	35228	Upload Photo
18 Douglas Row				57°28′49″N 4°13′50″W	Category B	35231	Upload Photo
19 Douglas Row				57°28′49″N 4°13′49″W	Category B	35232	Upload Photo
11 Drummond Crescent				57°27′44″N 4°13′37″W	Category B	35239	Upload Photo
2 Eastgate				57°28′41″N 4°13′22″W	Category B	35242	Upload Photo
Greig Street Bridge				57°28′45″N 4°13′48″W	Category B	35248	Upload another image See more images
3 Hill Place				57°28′40″N 4°13′21″W	Category B	35263	Upload another image
4 Huntly Place				57°28′54″N 4°14′07″W	Category B	35265	Upload Photo
Huntly Street And King Street, Inverness Roman Catholic Junior Secondary School				57°28′41″N 4°13′48″W	Category B	35273	Upload Photo
6 And 8 Inglis Street				57°28′42″N 4°13′22″W	Category B	35283	Upload Photo
10 And 12 Inglis Street				57°28′43″N 4°13′23″W	Category C(S)	35284	Upload Photo
29 Island Bank Road, Carrol				57°27′43″N 4°13′49″W	Category B	35293	Upload Photo
38 Island Bank Road				57°27′39″N 4°14′01″W	Category B	35298	Upload Photo
3 Ladies Walk				57°28′12″N 4°13′40″W	Category B	35304	Upload Photo
5 Ladies Walk				57°28′11″N 4°13′40″W	Category C(S)	35306	Upload Photo
6 Ladies Walk				57°28′10″N 4°13′40″W	Category B	35307	Upload Photo
10 Ardross Street				57°28′30″N 4°13′49″W	Category B	35135	Upload Photo
Town Steeple, 2 Bridge Street And Church Street				57°28′39″N 4°13′32″W	Category A	35153	Upload another image See more images
Chapel Street Chapel Yard, Gatepiers And Boundary Wall				57°28′53″N 4°13′44″W	Category C(S)	35170	Upload Photo
19 Church Street				57°28′40″N 4°13′33″W	Category B	35172	Upload Photo
7 Culduthel Road				57°28′25″N 4°13′26″W	Category B	35197	Upload Photo
19 Culduthel Road				57°28′15″N 4°13′18″W	Category C(S)	35199	Upload Photo
St Michael and All Angels Episcopal Church, Abban Street and Lochalsh Road				57°28′55″N 4°14′16″W	Category B	35114	Upload another image
118, 120, 122 Academy Street				57°28′51″N 4°13′41″W	Category C(S)	35121	Upload Photo
Eden Court Theatre Including Sculpture, Ness Walk				57°28′23″N 4°13′51″W	Category A	49959	Upload another image See more images
7-9 (Inclusive) Falcon Square				57°28′45″N 4°13′23″W	Category C(S)	35244	Upload another image

== Key ==
The scheme for classifying buildings in Scotland is:

- Category A: "buildings of national or international importance, either architectural or historic; or fine, little-altered examples of some particular period, style or building type."
- Category B: "buildings of regional or more than local importance; or major examples of some particular period, style or building type, which may have been altered."
- Category C: "buildings of local importance; lesser examples of any period, style, or building type, as originally constructed or moderately altered; and simple traditional buildings which group well with other listed buildings."

In March 2016 there were 47,288 listed buildings in Scotland. Of these, 8% were Category A, and 50% were Category B, with the remaining 42% being Category C.

== See also ==
- List of listed buildings in Inverness and Bona
- List of listed buildings in Highland
