= Inverness Town House =

Municipal building in Inverness, Scotland

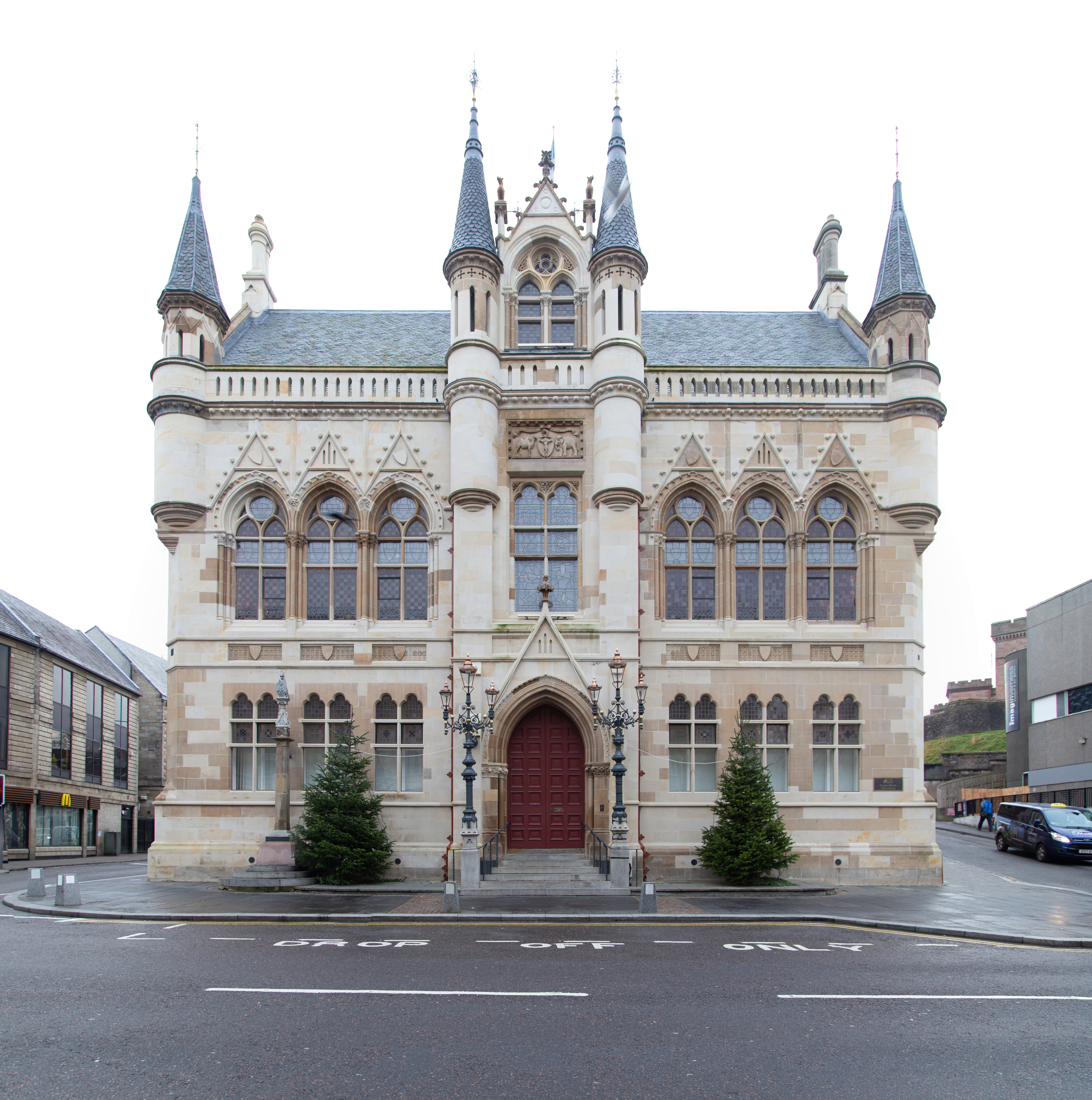
- Inverness Town House

- Shown in Inverness-shire
- 57.4773°N 4.2250°W
- Location: High Street, Inverness

History
- Built: 1882

Site notes
- Architect: William Lawrie
- Architectural style: Gothic style

Listed Building – Category A
- Official name: High Street, Town House
- Designated: 21 May 1971
- Reference no.: LB35260

Inverness Town House is a municipal building in the High Street, Inverness, Scotland. The town hall, which was the headquarters of Inverness Town Council and now serves as a local office of the Highland Council, is a Category A listed building.

== History ==
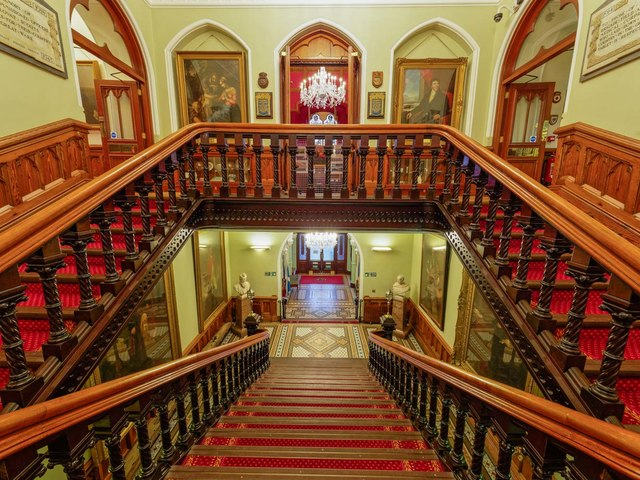
The main staircase

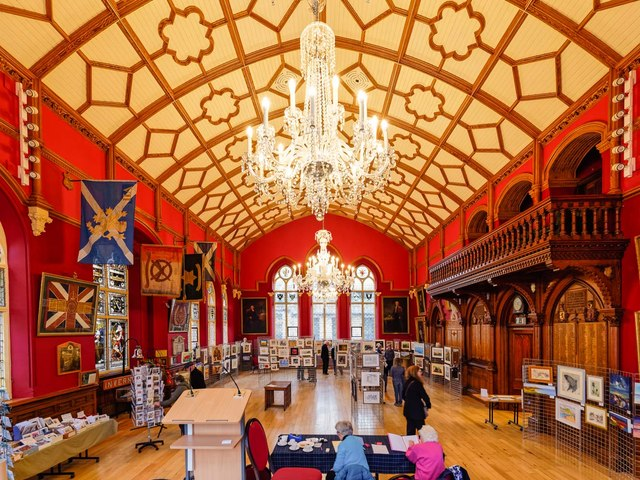
The main hall

The first municipal building in the town was the Inverness Tolbooth which dated back to at least 1593. After a new stone bridge was built across the River Ness in 1685, civic officials were accommodated in the East Gatehouse to the bridge.

A town house, intended to accommodate meetings of the burgh council, was built at the corner of Castle Wynd and the High Street. Erected on a site previously occupied by a private residence of Lord Lovat, it was completed in 1708 and subsequently enlarged in 1750. After Duncan Grant of Bught House died in 1873, leaving £5,000 towards the cost of a new town house, civic leaders decided to use the legacy to demolish the old town house and to construct a new building on the same site. Much of the design work had been undertaken by 1876.

The foundation stone for the new building was laid by the provost, Alexander Simpson, on 15 April 1878. It was designed by William Lawrie in the Gothic style, built with ashlar stone at a cost of £13,500 and was officially opened by the Duke of Edinburgh on 19 January 1882. A carved burgh coat of arms which had originally been used to decorate a bridge across the River Ness that had been completed in 1685, was rescued when the bridge was swept away in a flood in January 1849 and embedded in the west elevation of the new town house.

The design was modelled on The McManus, an art gallery and museum in Dundee which had been designed by George Gilbert Scott and completed in 1867. It involved a symmetrical main frontage with seven bays facing onto the High Street; the middle bay featured an arched doorway with a gablet roof on the ground floor, a mullioned window with the town's coat of arms carved into a panel on the first floor and a mullioned window in the attic all flanked by tourelles. The outer bays contained trefoil headed mullioned windows on the ground floor, mullion windows with tracery on the first floor and bartizans at the building corners. Internally, the principal rooms were the main hall, the council chamber and the committee room. The entrance vestibule leading to the staircase was lit by stained glass designed and manufactured by Adam & Small.

The council chamber was remodelled to a design by John Hinton Gall in 1894 and stained glass windows, designed by J. H. Stewart, were installed by William Meikle & Sons to celebrate Queen Victoria's Diamond Jubilee in 1898. The building was extended to the rear to a design by James Robert Rhind in 1907.

The building was the venue for the first British Cabinet meeting to be held outside London on 7 September 1921, when David Lloyd George, interrupted his holiday in Gairloch to call an emergency meeting to discuss the situation in Ireland: the Inverness Formula, which was developed at the meeting, formed the basis of the Anglo-Irish Treaty. King George V also attended the cabinet meeting in 1921 but then returned to the town house in 1929 to be presented with the freedom of the City of Inverness.

Inverness Town Council was replaced by the larger Inverness District Council in 1975, one of the lower-tier districts within the Highland region. The district council used the town house as its headquarters. Inverness District Council was in turn abolished in 1996 when the Highland region was redesignated as a single-tier council area. Highland Council continues to use the town house as one of its secondary offices and customer service points.

A two-year programme of refurbishment works to the main frontage of the building was carried out by Laing Traditional Masonry at a cost of £3.9 million based on a design by LDN Architects and completed in February 2018. The work, which included the replacement of two stone heraldic dogs, was commended in the UK Natural Stone Awards for 2018.

Works of art in the town house include a portrait by Allan Ramsay of the former Lord Mayor of London, Sir John Barnard, a portrait by Henry Raeburn of the former Provost of Inverness, Sir John Mackintosh of Aberarder and a 16th-century painting by an unknown Italian artist depicting the Holy Family with Saint John the Baptist.

== See also ==
- List of Category A listed buildings in Highland
- List of listed buildings in Inverness
