= List of listed buildings in Inverness and Bona =

This is a list of listed buildings in the parish of Inverness and Bona (outwith the burgh of Inverness) in Highland, Scotland. For listed buildings within Inverness burgh, see List of listed buildings in Inverness.

== List ==
Name	Location	Date Listed	Grid Ref. (Note: Sometimes known as OSGB36, the grid reference (where provided) is based on the British national grid reference system used by the Ordnance Survey. • "Guide to National Grid". Ordnance Survey. • "Get-a-map". Ordnance Survey.)	Geo-coordinates	Notes	LB Number (Note: Historic Environment Scotland assign a unique alphanumeric identifier to each designated site in Scotland, for listed buildings this always begins with "LB", for example "LB12345".)	Image
Culloden House Dovecote				57°29′16″N 4°08′10″W	Category B	10953	Upload another image See more images
Caledonian Canal, Dochgarroch Locks, Lock Keeper's Cottage And Barn				57°25′59″N 4°18′12″W	Category C(S)	8033	Upload another image
Culloden, Loch Lann (Former Culloden House Kennels)				57°29′11″N 4°08′00″W	Category B	8040	Upload Photo
Culloden Ice House				57°29′26″N 4°07′46″W	Category C(S)	8041	Upload another image
Drumossie Hotel				57°27′27″N 4°09′35″W	Category B	8046	Upload another image See more images
Dunain House				57°27′03″N 4°17′20″W	Category C	8047	Upload another image
Leys Castle, The Grange				57°26′07″N 4°12′05″W	Category B	8055	Upload Photo
Ness Castle And Glass Houses				57°26′38″N 4°14′56″W	Category B	8056	Upload Photo
Culloden House Walled Garden				57°29′31″N 4°08′16″W	Category B	10952	Upload Photo
Bona Church Of Scotland And Manse				57°24′28″N 4°20′24″W	Category B	8032	Upload Photo
Cradlehall House				57°28′27″N 4°09′52″W	Category B	8036	Upload Photo
Drumdevan House				57°26′31″N 4°14′31″W	Category C(S)	8045	Upload Photo
Dochfour House, Gardener's Cottage And Walled Garden				57°25′08″N 4°19′43″W	Category C(S)	8065	Upload Photo
Dochfour House				57°25′18″N 4°19′31″W	Category A	8028	Upload another image See more images
Craig Dunain Hospital				57°27′50″N 4°16′30″W	Category B	8037	Upload another image See more images
Culloden House, Gate Piers And Gardeners' Bothy				57°29′26″N 4°08′07″W	Category A	8039	Upload another image See more images
Stratton Lodge Hotel				57°29′22″N 4°09′07″W	Category B	8060	Upload another image
Abriachan, Balbeg Mill				57°22′57″N 4°23′30″W	Category C(S)	8029	Upload another image
Bona Free Church and Burial Ground, Dochfour				57°24′57″N 4°19′43″W	Category C(S)	8043	Upload another image
Dochfour House Obelisk And Private Burial Ground				57°25′43″N 4°18′56″W	Category B	8063	Upload another image
Dochfour, Church Cottage, Kirkton				57°24′59″N 4°19′42″W	Category C(S)	8066	Upload Photo
Allanfearn Farmhouse				57°29′58″N 4°08′39″W	Category B	8030	Upload Photo
Dunain Park Hotel				57°27′13″N 4°16′29″W	Category C(S)	8048	Upload another image
Inshes House				57°27′54″N 4°10′38″W	Category B	8049	Upload Photo
Killianan Burial Ground				57°22′48″N 4°22′39″W	Category C(S)	8052	Upload Photo
Raigmore Tower				57°28′14″N 4°08′46″W	Category B	8057	Upload Photo
AA Sentry Box (No 631), Brachla				57°21′49″N 4°23′36″W	Category B	49223	Upload another image See more images
Culloden House Stables and Yard Wall				57°29′18″N 4°08′09″W	Category A	10954	Upload another image See more images
Caledonian Canal, Lochend, Bona Lighthouse				57°24′29″N 4°19′43″W	Category B	8034	Upload another image See more images
Culloden Moor, Kings Stable Cottage				57°28′34″N 4°06′50″W	Category B	8042	Upload another image
Leys Castle Lodge				57°26′19″N 4°12′15″W	Category C(S)	8054	Upload Photo
Seafield Of Raigmore				57°29′08″N 4°10′31″W	Category B	8058	Upload Photo
Dochgarroch House				57°26′14″N 4°18′20″W	Category B	8067	Upload Photo
Bogbain Farmhouse				57°26′54″N 4°09′14″W	Category C(S)	8031	Upload Photo
Inshes House, Tower House In Grounds				57°27′53″N 4°10′38″W	Category A	8050	Upload Photo
Inshes, Helen's Lodge				57°27′48″N 4°10′49″W	Category C(S)	8051	Upload Photo
Leys Castle And Garden Terraces				57°26′24″N 4°12′02″W	Category A	8053	Upload Photo
Dochfour House, East Drive Entrance Gate Piers And Gates, Gate Lodge And Policy Walls Fronting A82 Road				57°25′41″N 4°18′36″W	Category B	8061	Upload Photo
Dochfour House, Farm Steading				57°25′26″N 4°19′27″W	Category B	8062	Upload another image
Castlehill House				57°28′11″N 4°10′29″W	Category B	8035	Upload another image
Culduthel House (Part Of Culduthel Hospital)				57°27′03″N 4°13′39″W	Category B	8038	Upload another image
Dochgarroch, Dunain Lodge (West Gate Lodge To Docharroch House) And Gate Piers				57°26′38″N 4°17′48″W	Category B	8044	Upload Photo
Stoneyfield House				57°28′55″N 4°11′09″W	Category B	8059	Upload another image
Dochfour House, Dairy				57°25′27″N 4°19′22″W	Category B	8064	Upload Photo

== Key ==
The scheme for classifying buildings in Scotland is:

- Category A: "buildings of national or international importance, either architectural or historic; or fine, little-altered examples of some particular period, style or building type."
- Category B: "buildings of regional or more than local importance; or major examples of some particular period, style or building type, which may have been altered."
- Category C: "buildings of local importance; lesser examples of any period, style, or building type, as originally constructed or moderately altered; and simple traditional buildings which group well with other listed buildings."

In March 2016 there were 47,288 listed buildings in Scotland. Of these, 8% were Category A, and 50% were Category B, with the remaining 42% being Category C.

== See also ==
- List of listed buildings in Inverness
- List of listed buildings in Highland
