= Alexander Laing (architect) =

Scottish architect (1752–1823)

- Born: 13 June 1752
- Died: 10 September 1823 (aged 71); Portobello, Edinburgh, Scotland
- Known for: Designing Scottish houses and castles

Alexander Laing (13 June 1752 – 10 September 1823) was a Scottish architect who was mainly involved in house and castle design.

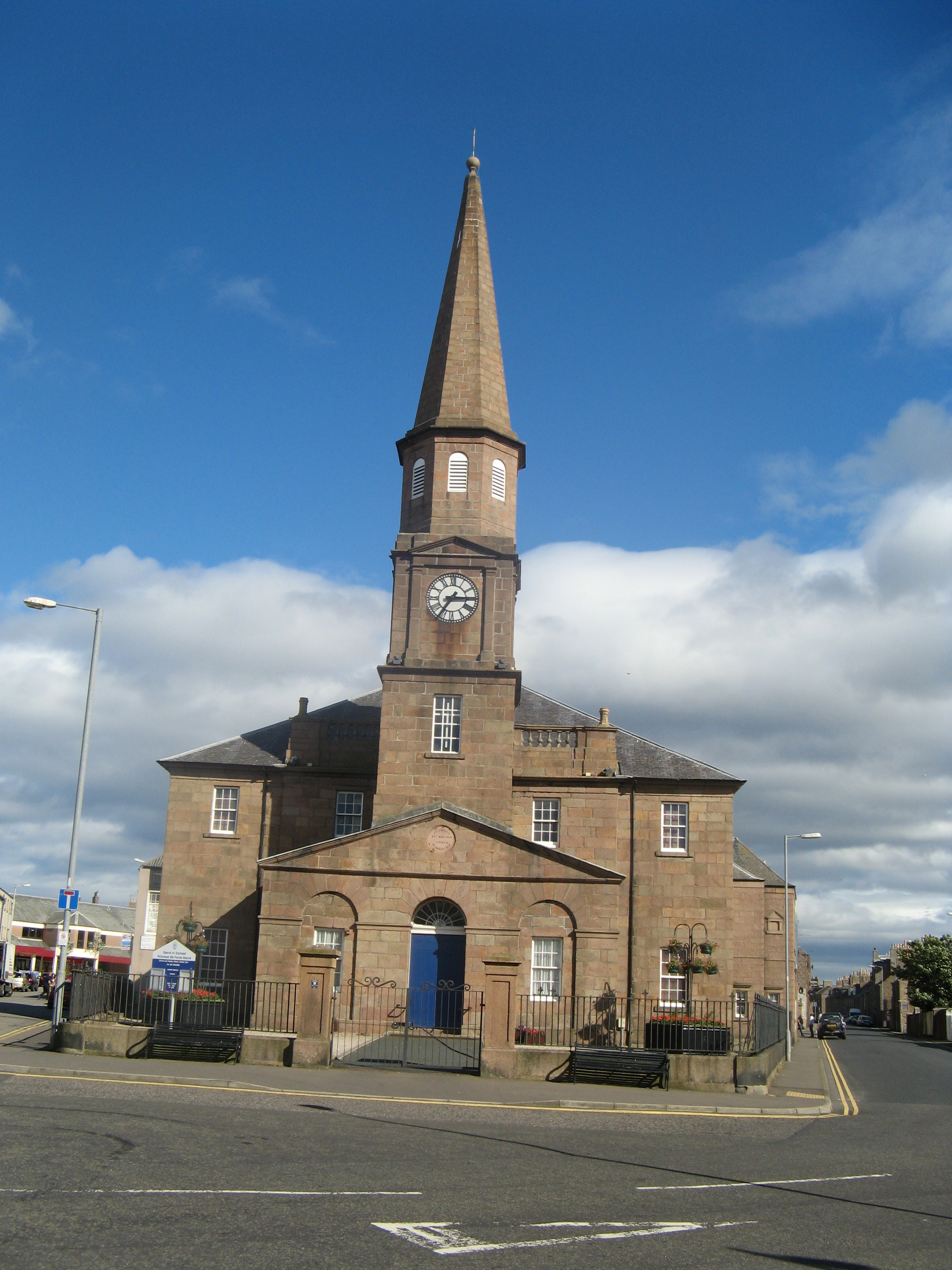
Peterhead's Old Parish Church, one of Laing's designs

== Life ==
He appears to be the son of Thomas Laing (d.1774), a knife- and tool-maker who lived near the Theatre on Edinburgh's Royal Mile.

Laing trained as a stonemason, and (as was typical in that age) was also styled "architect", and was based in Edinburgh; He is first listed in Williamson's Edinburgh Directory of 1774 as a "Mason" living at Theatre Row (on the south side of the Royal Mile near the now Museum of Childhood).

Laing married three times: first to Charlotte Polson in 1772, then to Margaret Turnbull in 1786, and finally to Beatrix Currie in 1789.

He had a son, Francis (1 May 1773 – 24 November 1861), with Charlotte. He also had a daughter, Jane, who married Captain Alexander Robertson in 1808.

In 1795, Laing purchased the James Adam-designed 7 York Place, the manse for the adjacent St George's Chapel in Edinburgh, where he lived until 1818.

He left York Place in 1818. He moved to 6 Gayfield Place (a house of his own design) at the top of Leith Walk and was still living there in 1823.

Laing died in Portobello in 1823, aged 71.

== Known works ==
Laing's works include:

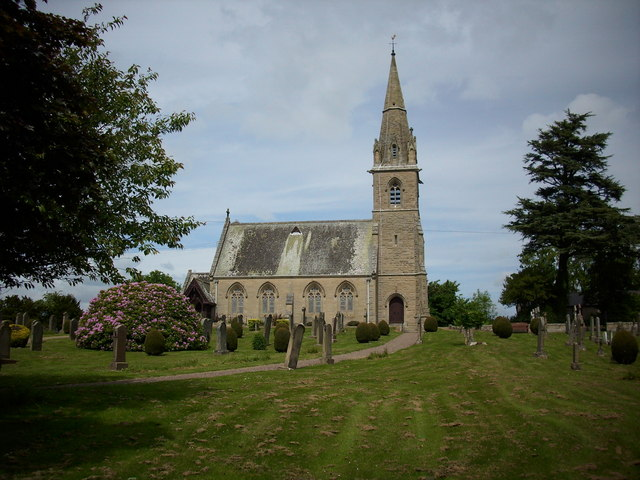
Langton Parish Church in Gavinton

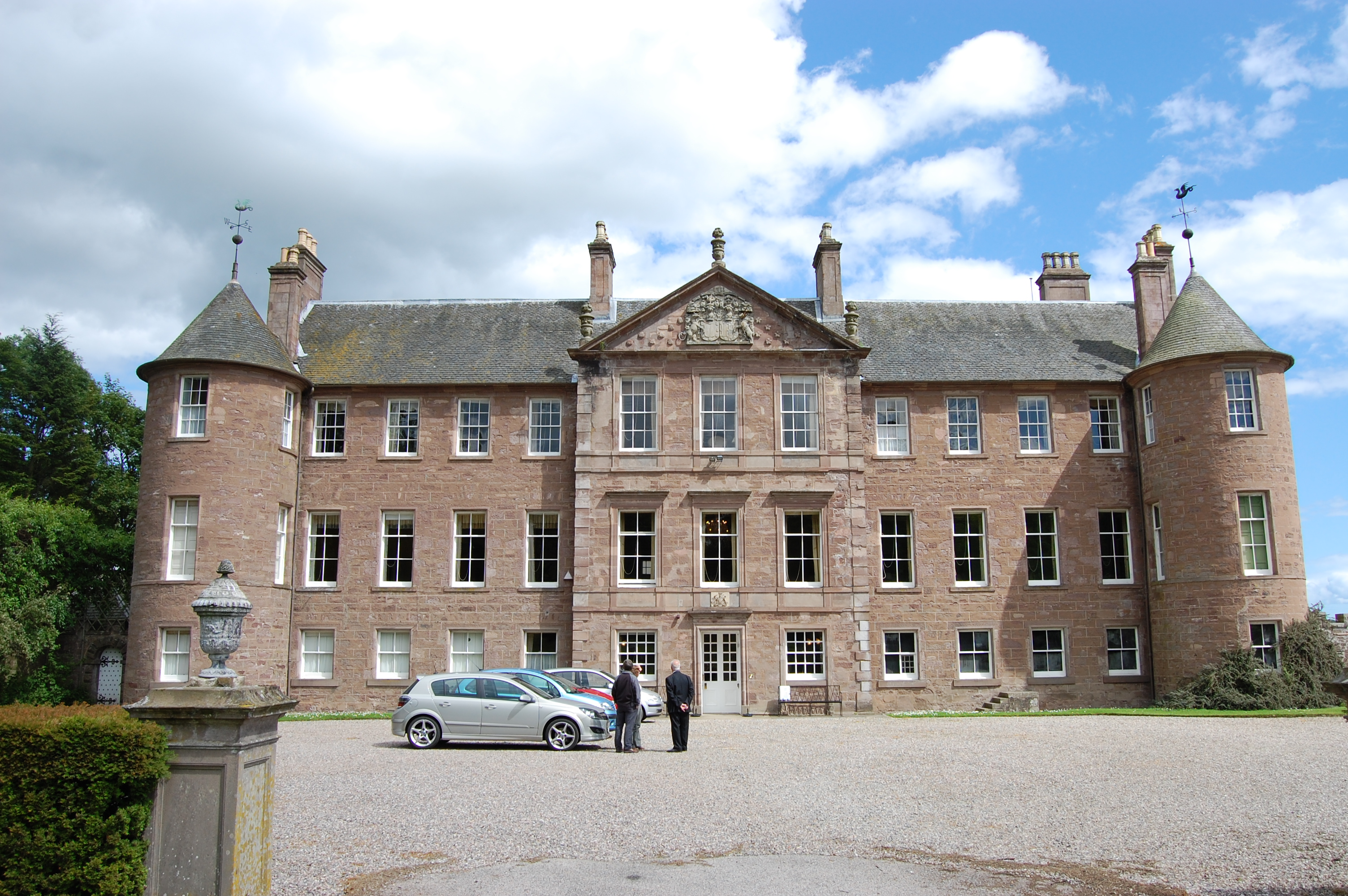
Brechin Castle

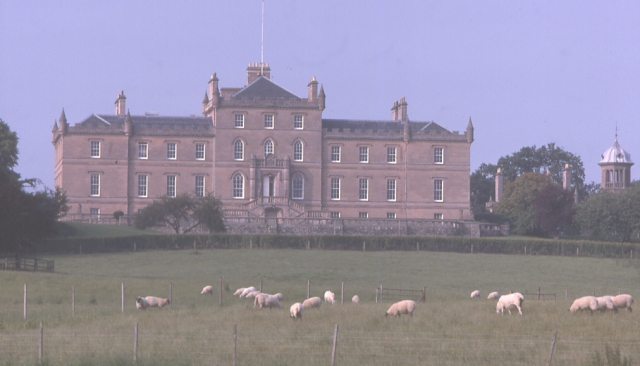
Darnaway Castle

- Archers Hall, Edinburgh (1776)
- High School, Edinburgh (1777)
- Retreat House, Abbey St Bathans (1778)
- House for Sir James Hunter Blair, 1st Baronet and his new wife (1781)
- Wings on Dalmahoy House (1785)
- Bridge at Dalmahoy (1787)
- Steeple, Town House, Inverness (1789)
- Inverness Royal Academy (1790)
- Dunnikier House (1791)
- Two villas at Gayfield Square (1791/2) 6 Gayfield Sq and 6 Gayfield Pl
- Remodelling of Brechin Castle (1795)
- Over Rankeillor House, Fife (1795)
- Remodelling of Darnaway Castle (1796 to 1802)
- South Queensferry Harbour (1797)
- House at 8 York Place, Edinburgh (1798)
- Langton Church, Gavinton (1798)
- Royal Northern Infirmary, Inverness (1799)
- Dysart Church (1802)
- Remodelling of Invermay and estate buildings, Forteviot (1802)
- Parish Church, Huntly, Aberdeenshire (1804)
- Peterhead Parish Church (1804)
- Drumsheugh House, Edinburgh (1808)
- Extension to Dysart House (1808)
- Manse at Dunfermline Abbey (1814)
- Manse at Grange, Banffshire (1814)
- Manse at Aberdour (1822)
