= Highland Council Headquarters =

Council headquarters in Inverness, Scotland

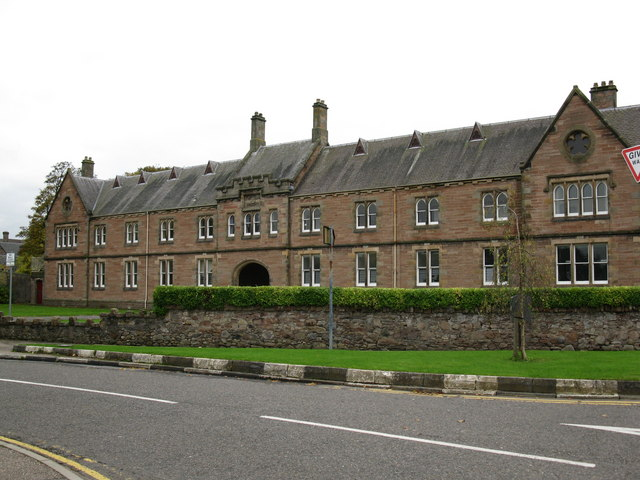
- The original frontage on Ardross Street

- Shown in Highland
- 57.4741°N 4.2334°W
- Location: Glenurquhart Road, Inverness

History
- Built: 1876

Site notes
- Architect: Alexander Ross
- Architectural style: Gothic Revival style

Listed Building – Category C(S)
- Official name: Ardross Street, Highland Regional Council Buildings
- Designated: 15 June 1981
- Reference no.: LB35144

The Highland Council Headquarters, formerly County Buildings, is a municipal structure in Glenurquhart Road, Inverness, Highland, Scotland. The oldest part of the complex, which currently serves as the headquarters of the Highland Council, is a Category C listed building.

== History ==
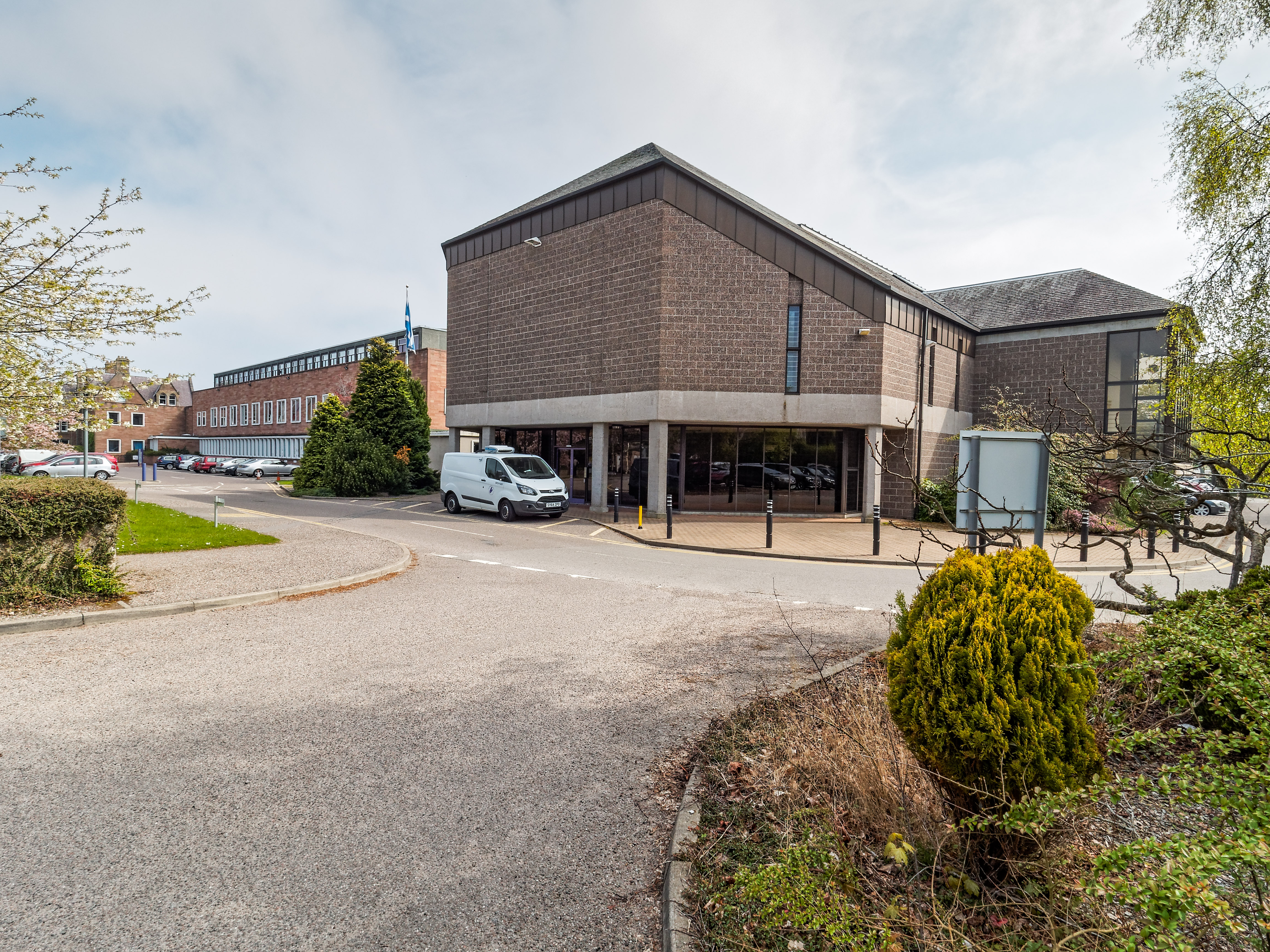
The council chamber (in the foreground)

The oldest part of the current structure is the main frontage on Ardross Road which was commissioned by the Northern Counties Collegiate School, an educational establishment which was founded with strong connections with the Army and India in 1873. Originally known as Inverness College, it also went by Inverness Collegiate School and The Boy's College before closing in about 1914. The building was designed by Alexander Ross in the Gothic Revival style, built in coursed stone and was completed in 1876.

The design involved a symmetrical main frontage of eleven bays facing onto Ardross Street with the end bays slightly projected forward as pavilions. The central bay, which also slightly projected forward, featured an arched pend on the ground floor, a bi-partite cusped window flanked by two single cusped windows on the first floor, and a battlement above. The wings were fenestrated by bi-partite plain windows on the ground floor and bi-partite cusped windows on the first floor. The end bays were fenestrated by tri-partite plain windows on the ground floor and quadri-partite cusped windows on the first floor with gables containing rose windows above.

The building was extended by two bays along Glenurquhart Road to a design by the same architect in 1885. It was requisitioned for use by the Admiralty during the First World War. After the war, it was acquired by the County Education Authority and converted for use as the Inverness Royal Academy War Memorial Hostel. After the hostel moved to Culduthel Road in Inverness in the early 1930s, Inverness-shire County Council progressively moved its departments from Inverness Castle into the building and renamed it "County Buildings".

The complex was extended further along Glenurquhart Road with a modern structure built of brick and glass which was completed in 1963 providing additional office accommodation.

Inverness-shire County Council continued to hold its meetings at Inverness Castle until the council's abolition in 1975. Its successor, the Highland Regional Council, used the Glenurquhart Road site as its main offices, but the council chamber at Inverness Castle was too small to host meetings of the regional council. The new council therefore initially held its meetings in the larger council chamber at the former Ross and Cromarty County Council's headquarters at County Buildings, Dingwall. A purpose-built council chamber was subsequently added to the Glenurqhuart Road site, being a concrete structure to the south of the 1963 wing, linked to it by a first floor bridge. The council chamber cost £1.6m and was formally opened on 24 October 1986.

The complex remained the seat of local government when the Highland Region was redesignated as a single-tier council area in 1996, since when the council has been called the Highland Council.

A Pictish stone carved between 700 and 800 AD and found at Knocknagael, some 4 kilometres (2.5 mi) south of Inverness, which became known as the "Knocknagael Boar Stone" because it depicted a boar, was recovered and placed behind glass within the complex in 1991.

Works of art in the building include a portrait by Charles Martin Hardie of Captain Abraham Howling, Master of Trinity House.

== See also ==
- List of listed buildings in Inverness
