= Greig Street Bridge =

Suspension bridge in Inverness, Scotland

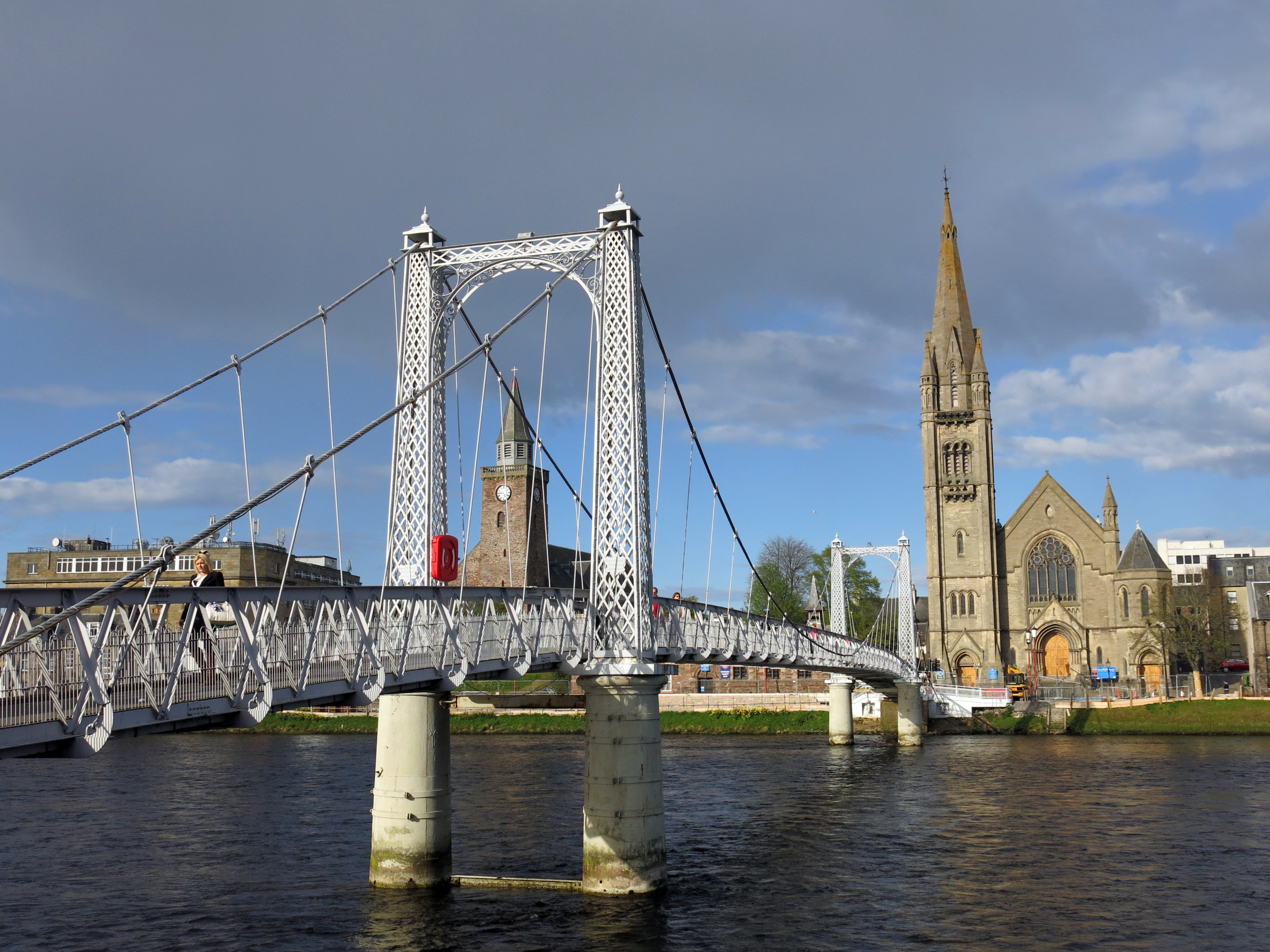
- View of bridge with the Free North Church of Scotland in the background
- Coordinates: 57.4791°N 4.2298°W
- OS grid reference: NH 66394 45396
- Crosses: River Ness
- Locale: Highland
- Preceded by: Ness Bridge
- Followed by: Friars Bridge

Characteristics
- Design: Suspension

History
- Construction start: 1880
- Construction end: 1881
- Construction cost: £1,400

Listed Building – Category B
- Official name: Greig Street Footbridge
- Designated: 20 May 1971
- Reference no.: LB35248

Location
- Interactive map of Greig Street Bridge

Greig Street Bridge is a footbridge across the River Ness located in Inverness, Scotland. It is a suspension bridge built in 1880–1 by the civil engineer C. Manners in conjunction with the Rose Street Foundry for a cost of £1,400.

It is composed of two side spans of 20.4 metres (67 ft) and a central span of 61.3 metres (201 ft). The bridge has warren trusses with an additional railing for pedestrian safety. The cables were replaced in 1952, as were the anchorages in 1989.

An important rite of passage for young Invernesians involves getting a third of the way onto the bridge and jumping up and down in unison. This creates the famous Greig Street sine wave, to the delight of the perpetrators and the horror of tourists, giving it, and an identical bridge further upstream (Infirmary Bridge), the local nickname of "The Bouncy Bridge".

== See also ==
- List of bridges in Scotland
