= Inverness (Scottish district) =

Former local government district in Scotland

Coordinates: 57.47743°N 4.22495°W

- District
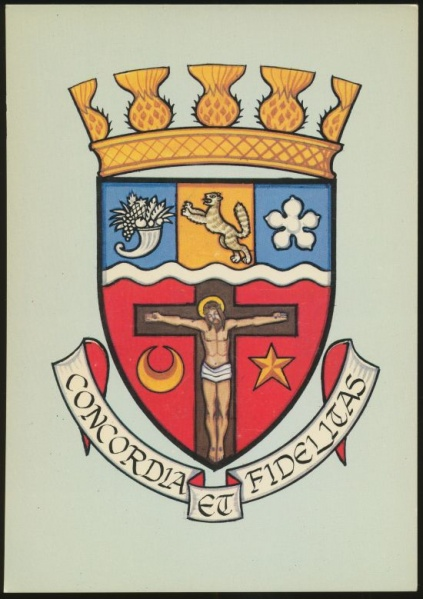

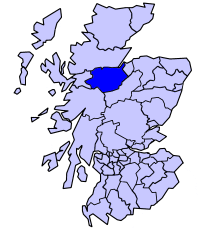
- History
  - Created: 16 May 1975
  - Abolished: 31 March 1996
  - Succeeded by: Highland
  - HQ: Inverness
- Contained within
  - Region: Highland Region

Inverness District was a local government district, created in 1975 as one of eight districts within the Highland region in Scotland. It was named after its largest settlement of Inverness, where its council was based. The district also included a large rural area, including Loch Ness. The district was abolished in 1996 when Highland was made a single-tier council area. Since then, the Highland Council has had an area committee covering a similar area to the abolished district.

== History ==
The district was created in 1975 under the Local Government (Scotland) Act 1973, which abolished Scotland's counties, burghs and landward districts and replaced them with a two-tier system of regions and districts. The new district covered three former districts, all of which had been part of Inverness-shire:

- Aird district (which covered the rural areas generally west of Loch Ness)
- Inverness burgh
- Inverness district (which covered the rural areas generally east of Loch Ness)

Inverness District Council was a district-level authority, with regional-level functions provided by the Highland Regional Council, which was also based in Inverness.

The districts and regions created in 1975 were abolished in 1996, under the Local Government etc. (Scotland) Act 1994 and replaced with single-tier council areas. The Highland region became one of the new council areas.

The Highland Council has a number of area committees for debating local matters. One of the committees is called the City of Inverness Area Committee (Inverness having been granted city status in 2000, after the district's abolition), comprising the councillors who represent the wards which broadly correspond to the pre-1996 Inverness District.

== Political control ==
The first election to the district council was held in 1974, initially operating as a shadow authority alongside the outgoing authorities until the district and its council formally came into being on 16 May 1975. Political control of the council was as follows:

Party in control	Years
Independent	1975–1988
No overall control	1988–1996

== Premises ==
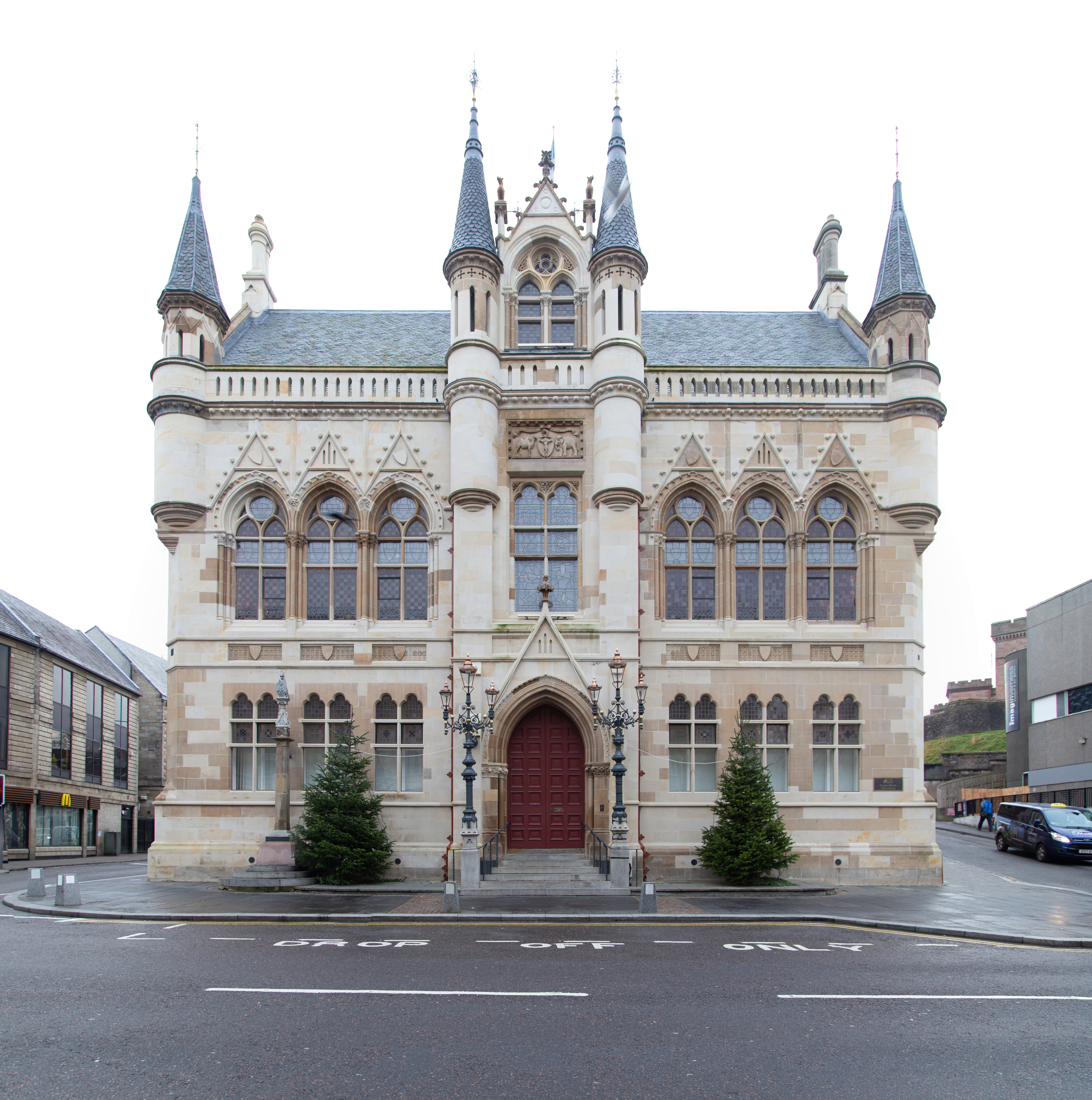
Inverness Town House: Council's headquarters

Inverness District Council met and had its main offices at Inverness Town House on the High Street in the centre of Inverness, which had been completed in 1882 for the old Inverness Town Council.

== See also ==
- Regions and districts of Scotland, 1975 to 1996
