= York Place, Edinburgh =

Street in Edinburgh, Scotland

Coordinates: 55.95623°N 3.19044°W

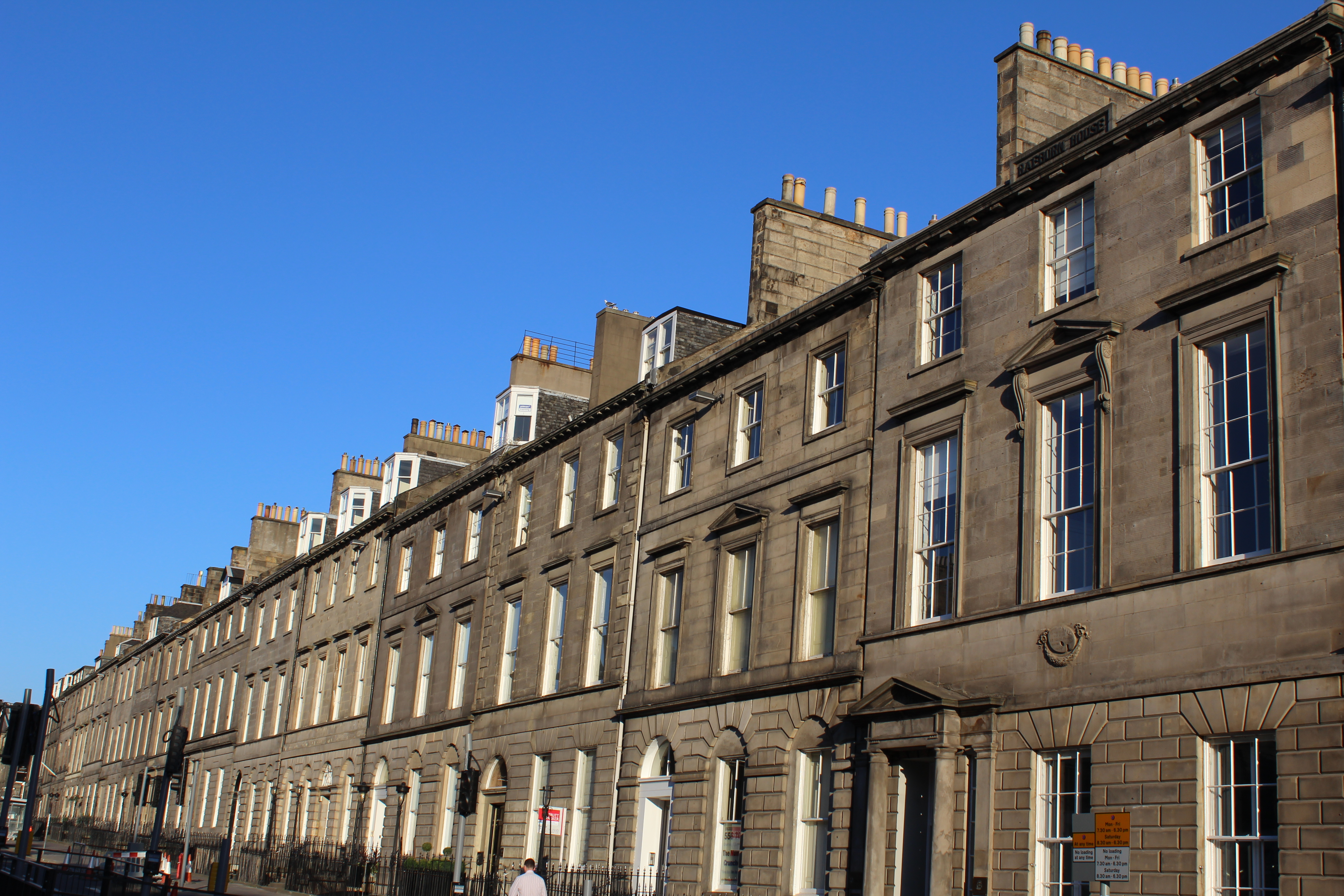
York Place, Edinburgh

York Place is a street in central Edinburgh of almost exclusively 18th century buildings, linking Queen Street to Broughton Street and Leith Walk.

The street's architecture remains almost completely intact but it is one of the busiest streets in the city centre being part of the main east-west route for traffic together with the Edinburgh Trams line and several bus services.

== History ==
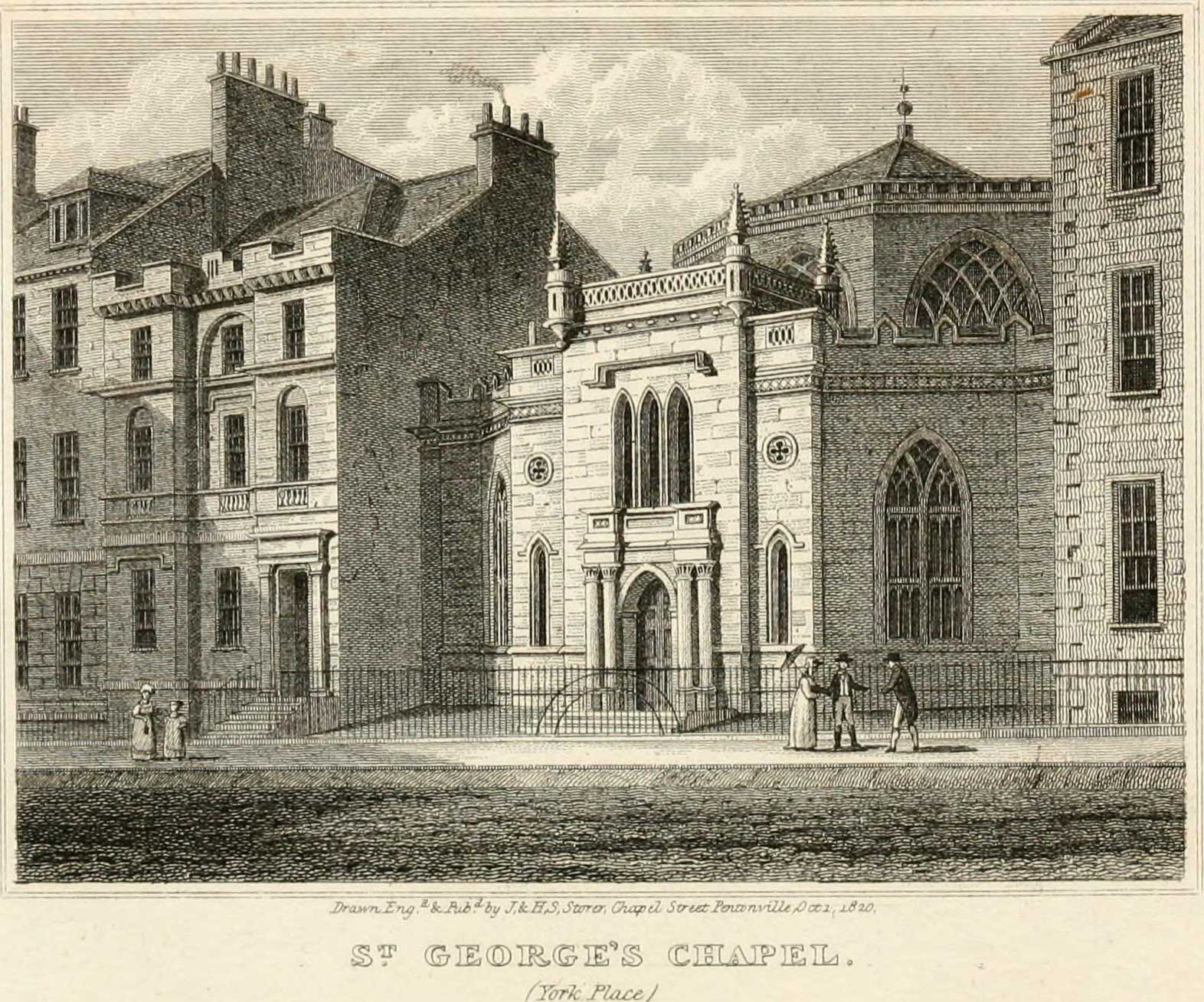
St George's Chapel in 1830 plus manse on its left

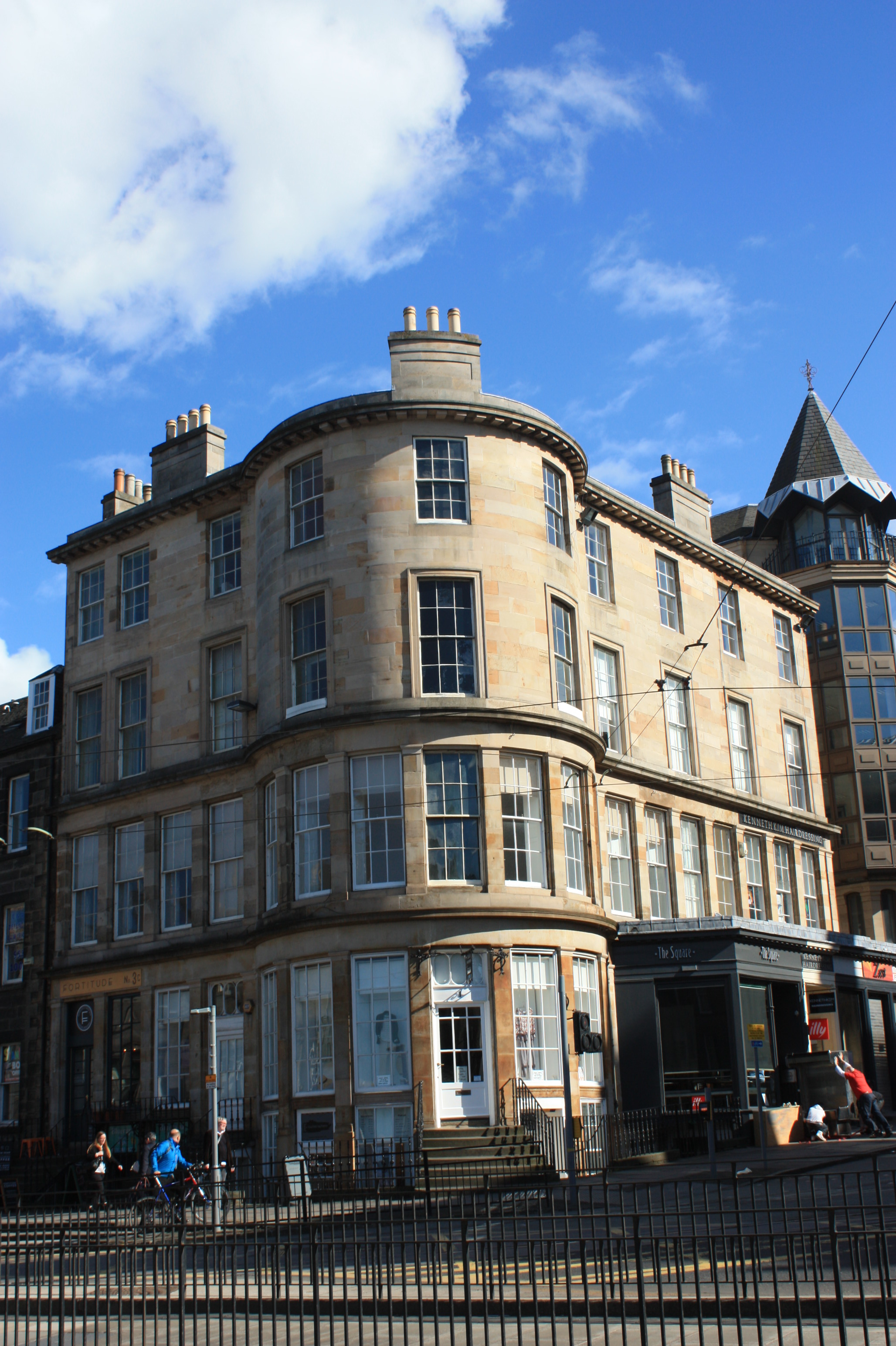
1 to 3 York Place, Edinburgh

York Place was developed as a dual sided street on the north-east edge of Edinburgh's First New Town. The land was purchased by the city from James Erskine, Lord Alva in 1793 and it was joined by the Heriot Trust which also owned land here. Work began immediately and was complete by 1804 (other than the church (see below).

The street is little altered. The only major change has been the demolition of the east side of Elder Street on the south side including the east corner with York Place, in 1969 (to improve access to the bus station).

In 1888 a tram system was introduced. Originally drawn by underground cables the system was invisible except for the rails and central channel (for the cable). This all changed in 1921 following unification of Edinburgh and Leith (which had electric trams since 1905) when a complex of poles and wires were added, to the severe detriment of the streetscape. These poles and cables were removed in 1956 following the demise of the trams. More conscious of the issue of "street clutter" the planners removed all lamp-posts from the street in the 1970s. The street is lit by high level floodlights mounted at eaves level on the buildings.

The temporary Edinburgh Trams terminus on York Place was removed in 2022 as part of the Trams to Newhaven project. A new permanent stop opened on nearby Picardy Place in June 2023 after completion of the line extension.

== Notable Buildings ==
- St Paul's and St George's Church by Archibald Elliot (built as St Paul's Chapel, 1816)
- St George's Episcopal Chapel by James Adam in 1792 with a new front added in 1934, now in use as a Genting Casino
- 7 York Pl - St George's manse, an unusual castellated house immediately east of the chapel (1793 remodelled in 1818 by Alexander Laing for his own use)
- 1 to 3 York Place, an exceptional corner block by David Paton featuring three lower commercial floors with more glass than wall
- 44 York Place built as a tax office in 1964, remodelled as a Premier Inn in 2018
- 72 York Place - The Conan Doyle public house - linked to the birthplace of Sir Arthur Conan Doyle 50m eastwards at Picardy Place.

== Notable residents ==
see No :

- 2 - James Orrock grew up here
- 6 - Thomas Meik civil engineer
- 7 - Alexander Laing (architect)
- 10 - David Milne
- 10 - William Craig, Lord Craig
- 10 - Admiral Sir David Milne and his son Sir Admiral Alexander Milne, 1st Baronet
- 10 - Lady Elizabeth Finch-Hatton
- 15 - James Bonar WS
- 16 - Adam Gillies, Lord Gillies
- 19 - John Abercrombie (physician)
- 20 - Sir James Montgomery, 2nd Baronet
- 21 - James Archer (artist)
- 22 - Alexander Irving, Lord Newton
- 23 - James Miller (surgeon)
- 23 - John Yule (botanist)
- 28 - Rev David Dickson
- 30 - Alexander Gillespie
- 32 - Sir Henry Raeburn artist (as his studio and sales room)
- 32 - Colvin Smith, artist
- 35 - Dionysius Wielobycki
- 36 - James Scarth Combe
- 37 - John Starforth architect
- 38 - John Lizars
- 40 - Alexander Osborne the giant
- 43 - John Abercrombie (physician)
- 47 - Alexander Nasmyth and his sons James Nasmyth and Patrick Nasmyth
- 55 - Andrew Geddes (artist)
- 57 - Thomas Hamilton (architect)
- 61 - Lady Sinclair of Murkle
- 61 - Frederick Hallard, legal author

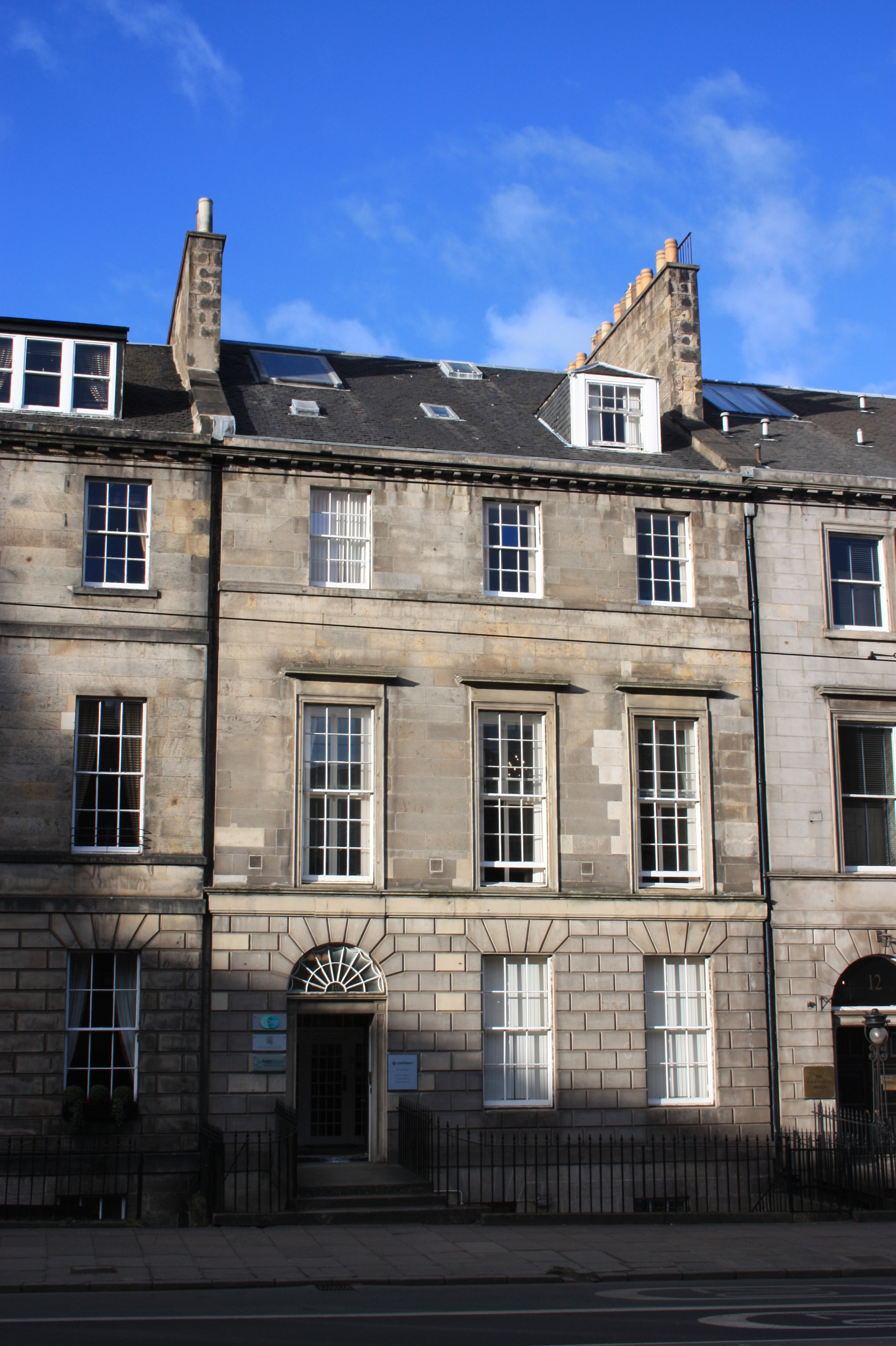
Townhouse 10 York Place, Edinburgh. Built in 1800s.

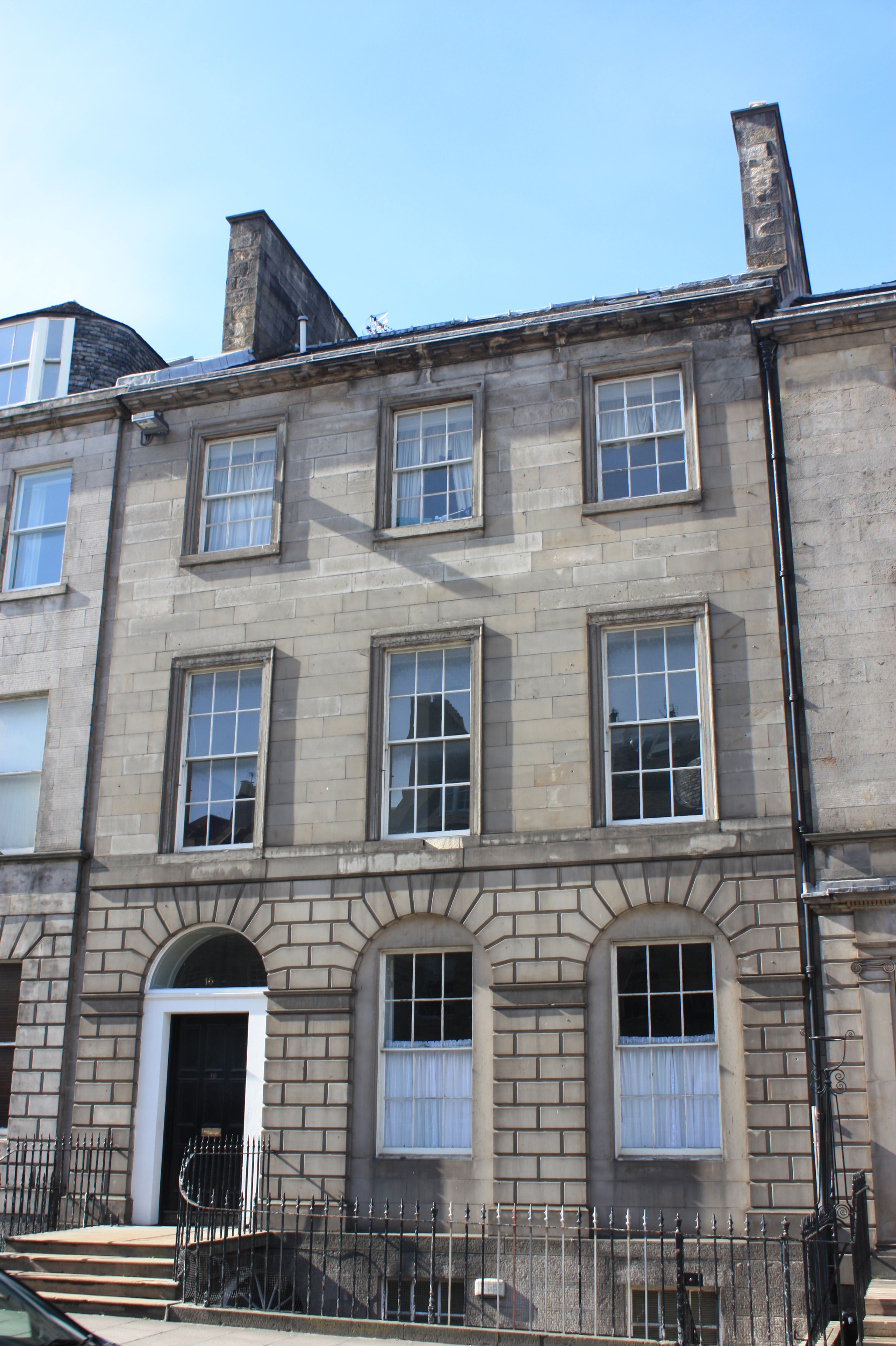
Lord Gillies' Edinburgh townhouse at 16 York Place
