= Inverness Town Steeple =

Judicial building in Inverness, Scotland

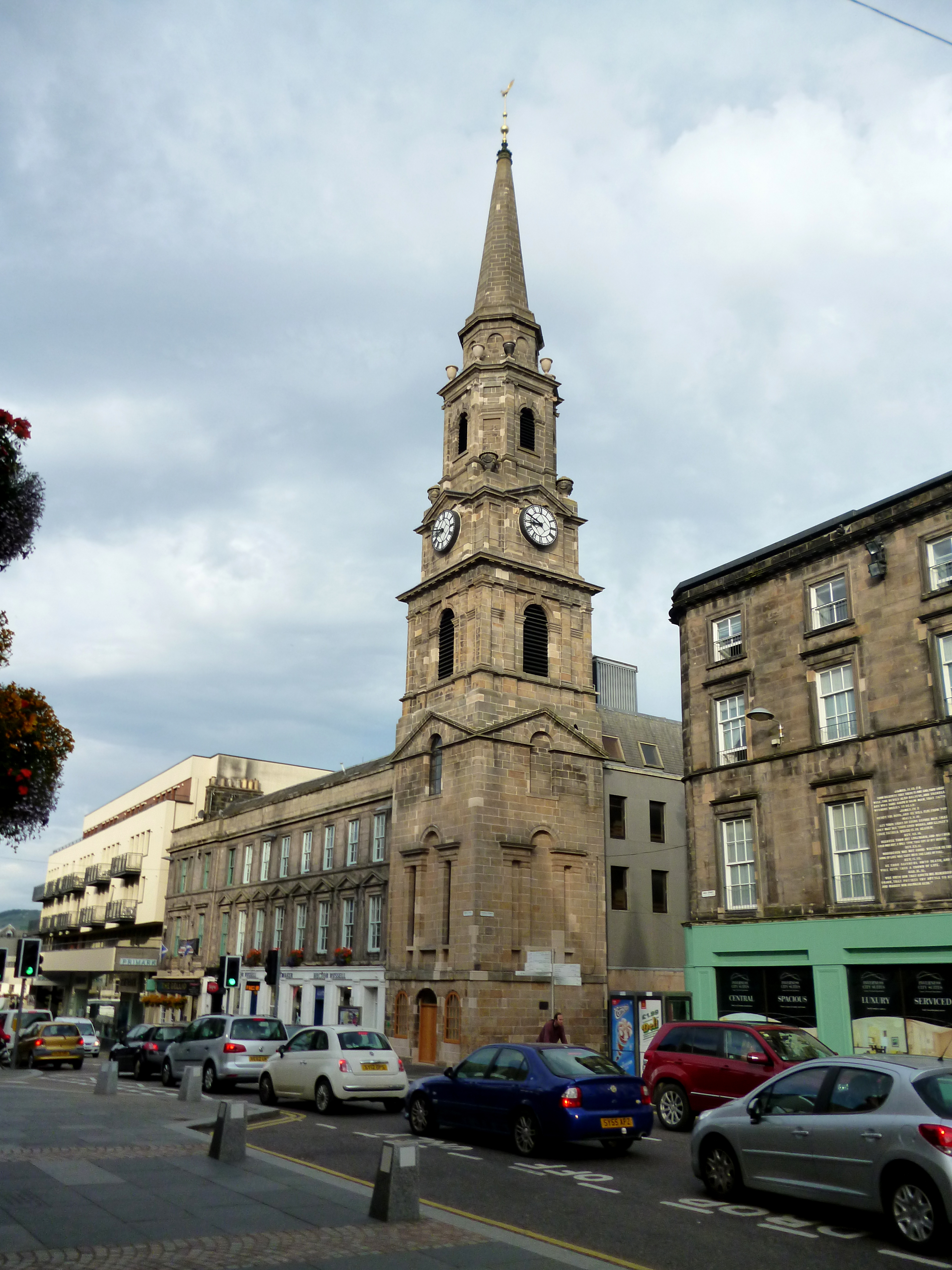
- The building in 2013

- Shown in Inverness-shire
- 57.4775°N 4.2256°W
- Location: High Street, Inverness

History
- Built: 1791

Site notes
- Height: 43 metres (141 ft)
- Architect: Alexander Laing
- Architectural style: Neoclassical style

Listed Building – Category A
- Official name: 2 Bridge Street and Church Street, Town Steeple
- Designated: 21 May 1971
- Reference no.: LB35153

Inverness Town Steeple, formerly known as the Inverness Tolbooth, is all that remains of the former tolbooth on the High Street in Inverness, Scotland. The building, which is currently used to accommodate a private business, is Category A listed.

== History ==
The first tolbooth in the town, referred to as the "Steeple of Inverness" dated back to at least 1593. After a new stone bridge was built across the River Ness in 1685, prison cells were accommodated in the spandrels of the bridge and offices for civic officials were accommodated in the East Gatehouse to the bridge, leaving the old tolbooth underutilised. (Note: A more permanent town house was erected at the corner of Castle Wynd and the High Street in 1708, and replaced by the current town house on the southeast side of the High Street in 1882.) The tolbooth was rebuilt in 1690 and benefited from its clock being repaired by Thomas Kilgour in 1692. Although repairs were carried out in 1732, the tolbooth was described as very dilapidated and in need of replacement by 1786.

Construction work on a new tolbooth, on the northwest side of Bridge Street, started in April 1789. It was designed by Alexander Laing in the neoclassical style, built by John Symens and William MacDonald in ashlar stone at a cost of £1,497 and was completed in May 1791. The design involved an asymmetrical main frontage, consisting of a courtroom block and a seven-stage tower, facing onto the High Street. In relation to the tower, there were three round headed openings in the first stage, a blind Venetian window in the second stage, a round headed window breaking into an open pediment in the third stage, rounded headed openings with louvres flanked by pairs of pilasters supporting an entablature with triglyphs in the fourth stage, clock faces in the fifth stage, an octagonal belfry in the sixth stage, and an octagonal platform in the seventh stage, all surmounted by a spire and a weather vane. The local member of parliament, Sir Hector Munro, contributed £105 towards the cost of the clock. The clock was designed and manufactured by James Bridges of Glasgow and the hour and quarters were struck on a set of three bells, with a "ting-tang" for the quarters. Internally, the principal rooms were a courtroom, which was 33 feet (10 m) long and 18 feet (5.5 m) wide, four prison cells, a guardroom, a jury room and a witness room.

Some notable trials took place in the building during the Highland Clearances. In 1792, tenant farmers from Strathrusdale led a protest about the clearances by driving more than 6,000 sheep off the land surrounding Ardross. Henry Dundas gave orders for the Black Watch to track them down. Five protestors were arrested, found guilty and sentenced to transportation to Australia. However, they escaped from the building before the sentence could be carried out. In 1814, during clearances at Strathnaver, the factor to the Sutherland Estate, Patrick Sellar, was accused of culpable homicide and arson, after the mother-in-law of a tenant farmer had her cottage set alight, and she subsequently died. Sellar was found not guilty, but a plaque on the building records the firm belief of the tenant farmers that he was guilty.

The spire, at the top of the tower, was damaged by an earth tremor on 13 August 1816, but was fully restored by 1828. After new courthouse and prison blocks were erected at Inverness Castle in 1836 and 1848 respectively, the tolbooth became redundant. After becoming dilapidated, the courthouse block was demolished in 1853, and was replaced by a row of shops, which were built adjoining the surviving tower.

The mechanism of the clock was electrified by James Ritchie and Sons of Edinburgh in 1979. The lower levels of the tower were converted for retail use and are currently occupied by a business selling historical and heraldic gifts, known as "Hall of Names".

== See also ==
- List of Category A listed buildings in Highland
- List of listed buildings in Inverness
