= Rose Street Foundry =

Coordinates: 57°28′51″N 4°13′36″W

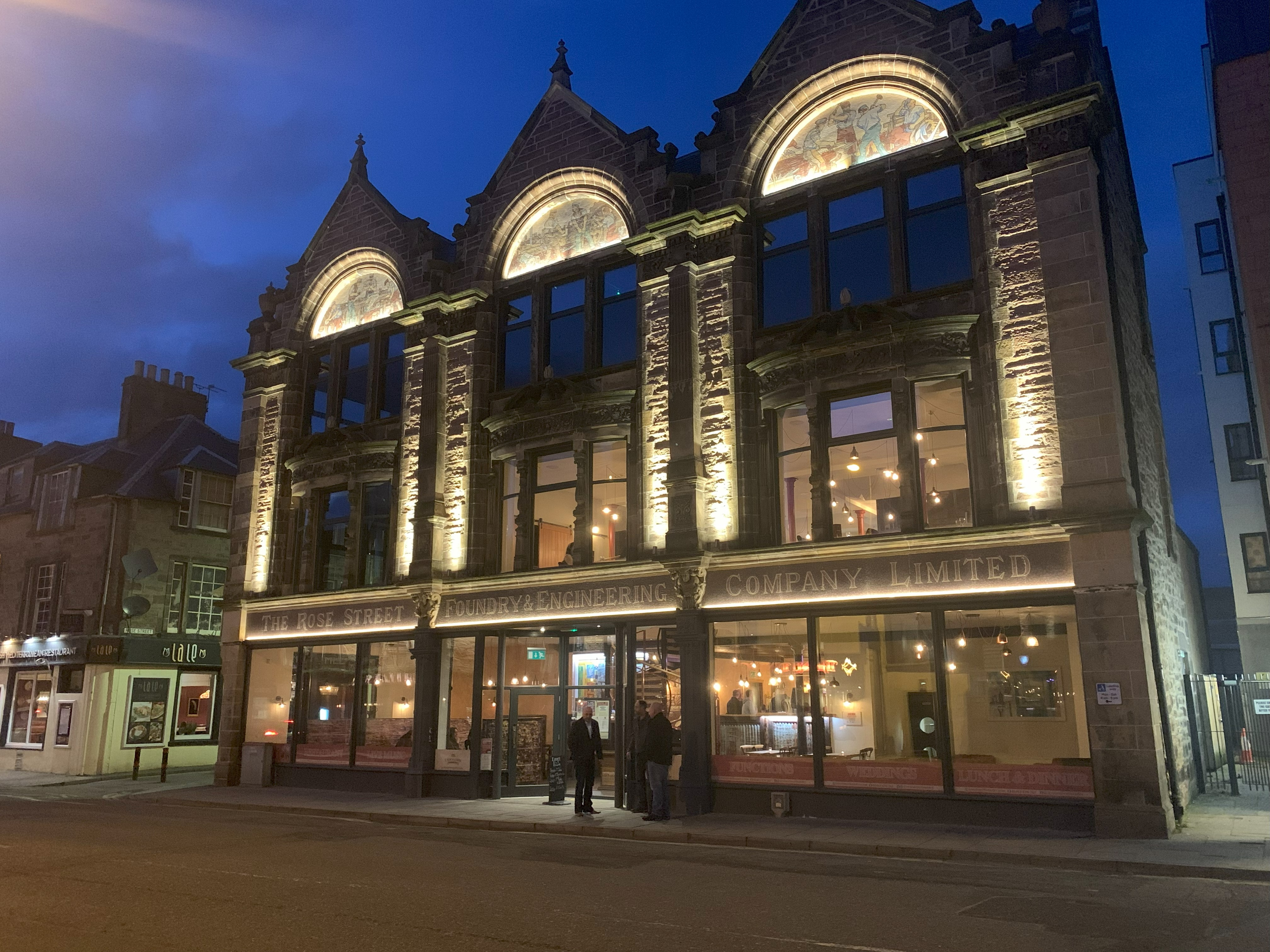
96 - 104 Academy Street, formerly offices of the Rose Street Foundry and Engineering Company

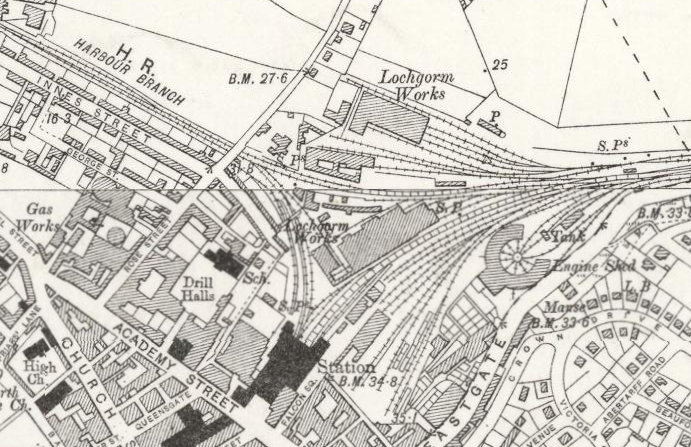
Centre of Inverness in 1902 showing Rose Street

Rose Street Foundry was an industrial facility established in Rose Street, Inverness in the 1830s. It was the property of the Inverness Iron Company until 1872 when the Northern Agricultural Implement and Foundry Company Limited was established to take over the Inverness Iron Company.

In 1881 this company was responsible for building the Greig Street Bridge, Inverness.

In 1885 a new premises were found at 18–21 Rose Street. The architect – and Provost of Inverness – Alexander Ross – who had obtained ironwork from the foundry for various of the buildings he had built – was engaged as the architect.

Aside from making agricultural implements, the company also worked on contracts for the Highland Railway.

There were two fires at foundry, the more seriously one being in 1888, with a second one in 1897.

== Foundry Offices ==
In 1903 the Rose Street Foundry and Engineering Company moved into their newly built Head Office, 96–104 Academy Street. In 2018 the Inverness Townscape Heritage Project (ITHP) announced a grant of £960,000 towards the costs of the full restoration of the building. The building was a Grade B listed property belonging to Cairngorm Taverns, who planned to turn it into a bar and restaurant. Jimmy Gray, chairman of Inverness City Heritage Trust, remarked that the building "is one of the most important buildings for local residents in Inverness. It is a popular heritage landmark for Inverness locals, many of whom have strong connections with it."
