= Highland (council area) =

Council area of Scotland

Highland: A' Ghàidhealtachd (Scottish Gaelic); Hieland (Scots)
- Council area
- Coat of arms

- Highland shown within Scotland
- Coordinates: 57°30′N 5°00′W
- Sovereign state: United Kingdom
- Country: Scotland
- Lieutenancy areas: Inverness; Nairn; Ross and Cromarty; Sutherland; Caithness
- Unitary authority: 1 April 1996
- Administrative HQ: The Highland Council Headquarters, Inverness

Government
  - Type: Council
  - Body: The Highland Council
  - Control: No overall control
  - MPs: 4 MPs: Brendan O'Hara (SNP); Jamie Stone (LD); Angus MacDonald (LD); Graham Leadbitter (SNP)
  - MSPs: 4 MSPs: Maree Todd (SNP); Fergus Ewing (SNP); Kate Forbes (SNP); Audrey Nicoll (SNP); +7 regional members

Area
  - Total: 9,905 sq mi (25,653 km^{2})
  - Rank: 1st

Population (2024)
  - Total: 237,290
  - Rank: 7th
  - Density: 23/sq mi (9/km^{2})
- Time zone: UTC+0 (GMT)
  - Summer (DST): UTC+1 (BST)
- ISO 3166 code: GB-HLD
- GSS code: S12000017
- Website: highland.gov.uk

The Highland (Scottish Gaelic: Gàidhealtachd, pronounced [ˈkɛːəl̪ˠt̪əxk]; (Note: Gàidhealtachd is used to translate Highland; in other contexts it is used to translate Scottish Highlands and Gaeldom.) Scots: Hieland) council area is a council area in the Scottish Highlands and is the largest local government area in both Scotland and the United Kingdom. It was the 7th most populous council area in Scotland at the 2011 census. It has land borders with the council areas of Aberdeenshire, Argyll and Bute, Moray and Perth and Kinross. The wider upland area of the Scottish Highlands after which the council area is named extends beyond the Highland council area into all the neighbouring council areas plus Angus and Stirling.

The Highland Council is based in Inverness, the area's largest settlement. The area is generally sparsely populated, with much of the inland area being mountainous with numerous lochs. The area includes Ben Nevis, the highest mountain in the British Isles. Most of the area's towns lie close to the eastern coasts. Off the west coast of the mainland the council area includes some of the Inner Hebrides, notably the Isle of Skye.

== Name ==
Unlike the other council areas of Scotland, the name Highland is often not used as a proper noun. The council's website only sometimes refers to the area as being Highland, and other times as being the Highland Council Area or the Highlands. Road signs on the boundary of the council area say "Welcome to the Highlands" rather than "Welcome to Highland".

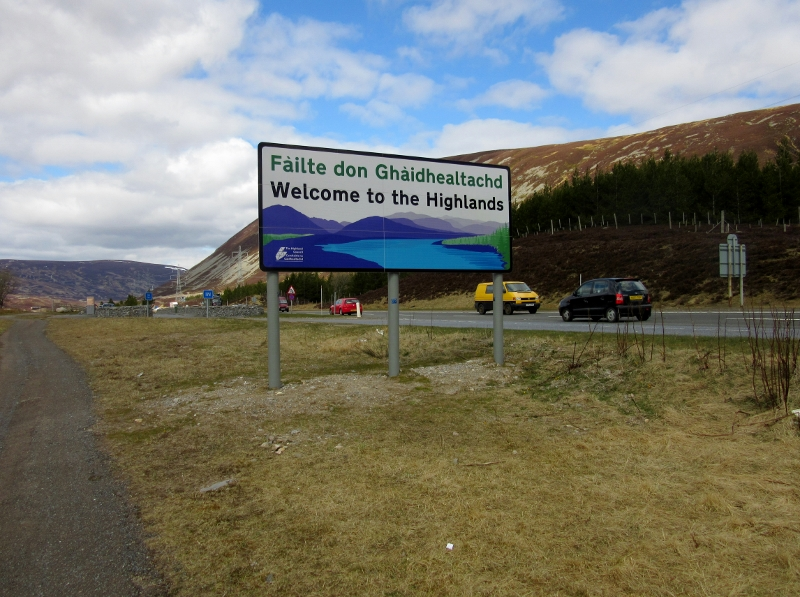
Road sign on the A9 where it enters the Highland council area south of Kingussie

Although named after it, the Highland council area does not cover the whole of the uplands and cultural region known as the Scottish Highlands. There is no official definition for the wider area, but it is often described to also include parts of the council areas of Aberdeenshire, Angus, Argyll and Bute, Moray, North Ayrshire, Perth and Kinross, Stirling or West Dunbartonshire.

== History ==
The Highland Region was created in 1975 under the Local Government (Scotland) Act 1973, which reformed local government across Scotland, replacing the counties, burghs and landward districts with a two-tier structure of upper-tier regions and lower-tier districts. Highland was one of the regions, and it was divided into eight districts: Badenoch and Strathspey, Caithness, Inverness, Lochaber, Nairn, Ross and Cromarty, Skye and Lochalsh and Sutherland.

Further local government reforms in 1996 under the Local Government etc. (Scotland) Act 1994 saw the regions and districts created in 1975 abolished and replaced with single-tier council areas. The former Highland region became one of the new council areas, run by the Highland Council. The Highland Council has run various area committees since its creation. These were initially based on the abolished districts, but have been reviewed a number of times since.

The Highland Region was created covering the area in 1975 as part of a two-tier local government structure of upper-tier regions and lower-tier districts. The Highland Region had eight districts. Local government was reorganised again in 1996 into single-tier council areas, with the former region becoming one of the new council areas.

== Geography ==
The Highland area covers the historic counties of Caithness, Inverness-shire, Nairnshire, Ross and Cromarty and Sutherland, with the exception of the parts of Inverness-shire and Ross and Cromarty in the Outer Hebrides. The area also includes an area around Ardnamurchan from the historic county of Argyll and the Grantown-on-Spey area from Moray, which were both transferred to the Highland region as part of the 1975 reforms.

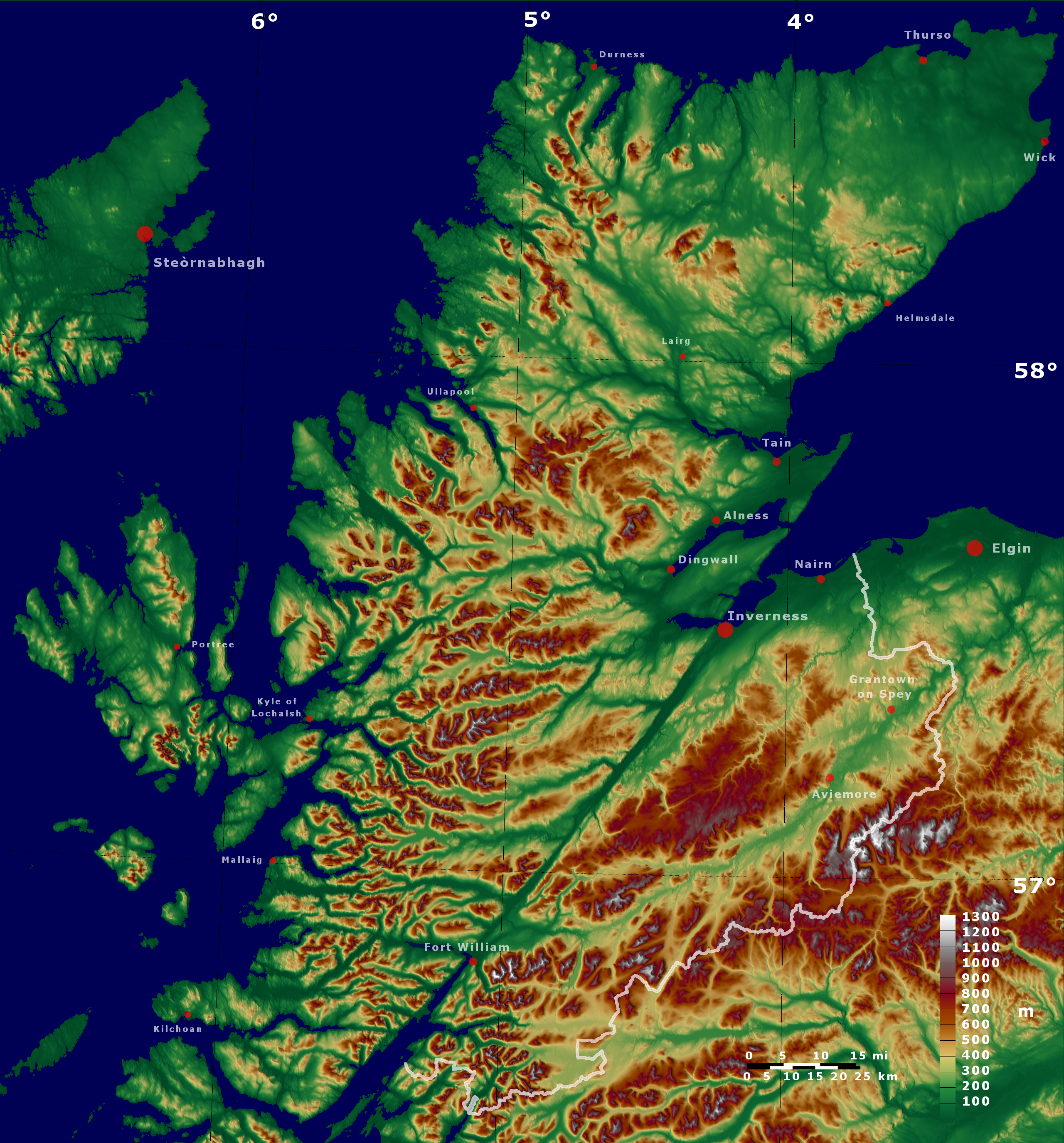
Topographic map of the Highland council area.

The council area covers a land area of 25,653 square kilometres (9,905 sq mi) – which is 11.4% of the land area of Great Britain, 32.9% of the land area of Scotland and an area 20% larger than Wales. The Highland and Islands division of Police Scotland also includes the Western Isles, Orkney and Shetland (the former area of the Northern Constabulary) and therefore covers an area of 30,659 square kilometres (11,838 sq mi), which is larger than that of the state of Belgium.

Though relatively populous for a Scottish council area, it is also sparsely populated. At 9 per km^{2} in 2024, the population density is less than one seventh of Scotland's as a whole, and comparable with that of Bolivia, Chad, Russia, or the U.S. state of Nebraska. Historically, the area was home to a much higher percentage of Scotland's population. The rural population of the Highlands (both within and outwith the council area) declined in the late 19th century even as Scotland's grew substantially. For example, the population of Skye declined from 23,082 in 1841 to 15,705 in 1891 and a low point of 7,183 in 1971, before growing in more recent decades.

The city of Inverness is by far the largest settlement, with its urban area having a population of 59,910 in 2012.

The highest point in the Highland council area is Ben Nevis, the tallest mountain in both Scotland and the United Kingdom as a whole. Its northernmost point is the Island of Stroma, in the Pentland Firth. Its southernmost point is on the Morvern peninsula. Highland contains the northernmost and westernmost points of the island of Great Britain, respectively at Dunnet Head and Corrachadh Mòr. Despite the name, not all of Highland is mountainous. The areas east of Inverness, as well as the Black Isle, eastern Sutherland, and all of Caithness are, in fact, low-lying.

== Gaelic language ==
According to the 2011 UK census, there are nearly 12,000 Scottish Gaelic speakers in the Highland area.

The 2022 Scottish Census reported that out of 229,632 residents aged three and over, 13,503 (5.9%) considered themselves able to speak or read Gaelic.

== Scots language ==
The 2022 Scottish Census reported that out of 229,631 residents aged three and over, 54,789 (23.9%) considered themselves able to speak or read the Scots language.

== Politics ==
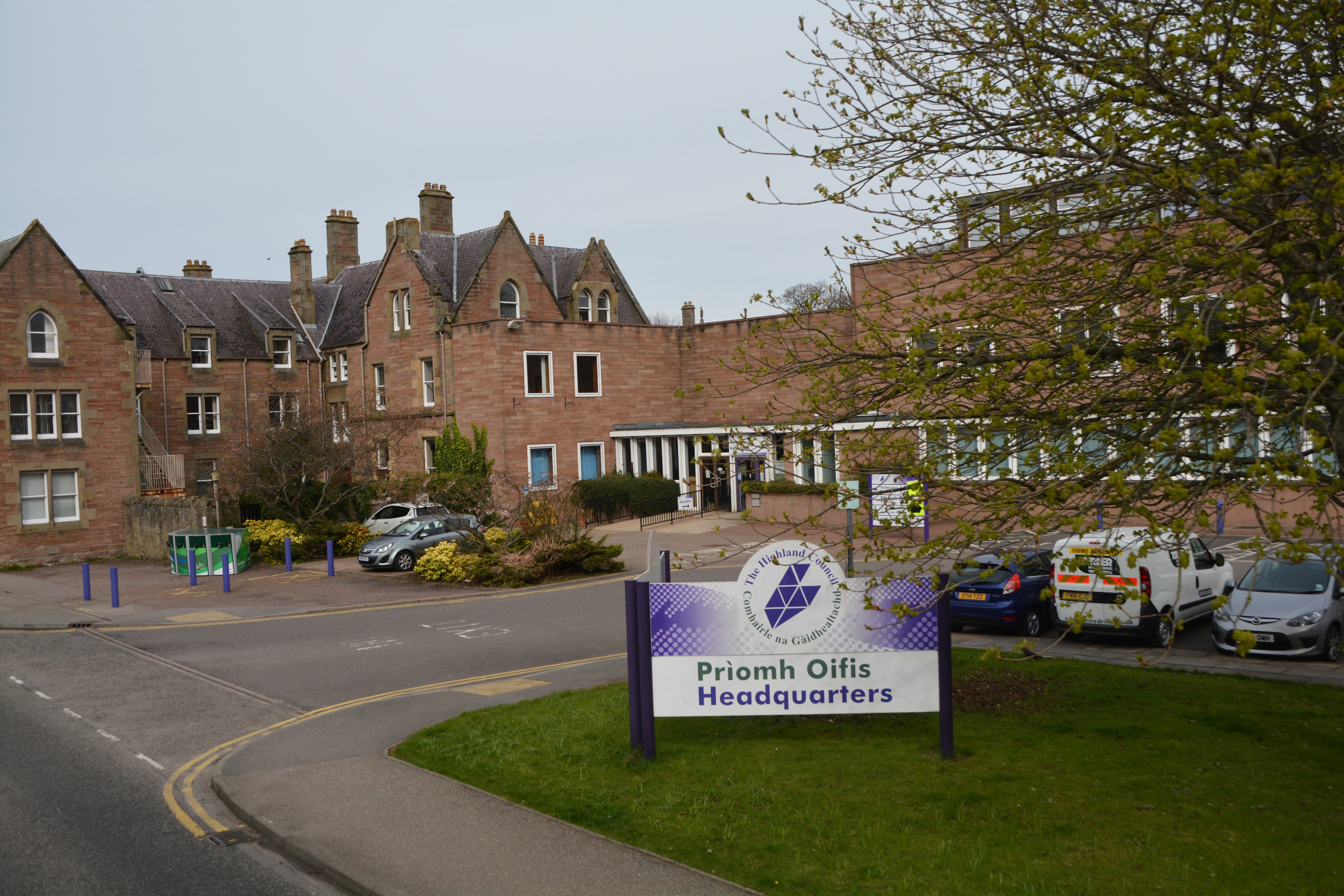
Highland Council Headquarters in Inverness

The local authority is the Highland Council, based at the Highland Council Headquarters in Inverness (formerly the main offices of Inverness-shire County Council). The council also has numerous local offices across the area.

For elections to the Scottish Parliament the Highland area is within the Highlands and Islands electoral area, which elects eight first past the post constituency Members of the Scottish Parliament (MSPs) and seven additional member MSPs. Three of the region's constituencies, each electing one MSP, are within the Highland area: Caithness, Sutherland and Ross, Inverness and Nairn and Skye, Lochaber and Badenoch.

In the House of Commons of the Parliament of the United Kingdom the Highland area is represented by Members of Parliament (MPs) elected from four constituencies: Caithness, Sutherland and Easter Ross; Inverness, Skye and West Ross-shire; Moray West, Nairn and Strathspey; and Argyll, Bute and South Lochaber. The latter two straddle the borders with neighbouring council areas. Each constituency elects one MP by the first past the post system of election.

== Settlements ==
The largest settlements in the Highland council area.

The largest settlements by population are:

Settlement	Population (2020)
Inverness	47,790
Nairn	10,190
Thurso	7,390
Wick	6,870
Alness	5,950
Fort William	5,600
Westhill	5,470
Dingwall	5,360
Invergordon	3,930
Culloden	3,830

Historical Highland population
Year	Pop.	±%
1801	164,294	—
1811	173,235	+5.4%
1821	196,364	+13.4%
1831	211,947	+7.9%
1841	213,969	+1.0%
1851	220,004	+2.8%
1911	226,144	+2.8%
1921	176,396	−22.0%
1931	167,604	−5.0%
1941	166,602	−0.6%
1951	165,600	−0.6%
1961	169,133	+2.1%
1971	172,666	+2.1%
1981	186,916	+8.3%
1991	203,790	+9.0%
2001	208,914	+2.5%
2011	232,132	+11.1%
2022	235,710	+1.5%

Other settlements include:

- Alness (Alanais), Altnaharra (Allt na h-Aire), Applecross (A' Chomraich), Ardersier (Àird nan Saor), Ardgour (Àirde Gobhar), Ardnamurchan (Àird nam murchan), Aviemore (An Aghaidh Mhòr), Avoch (Abhach), Auldearn
- Back of Keppoch (A' Cheapaich), Ballachulish (Baile a' Chaolais), Beauly (A' Mhanachainn), Bettyhill (Am Blàran Odhar), (the) Black Isle (An t-Eilean Dubh), Boat of Garten (Coit a' Ghartain), Bonar Bridge (Drochaid a' Bhanna), Broadford (An t-Àth Leathann), Brora (Brùra)
- Carrbridge (Drochaid Chàrr), Conon Bridge (Drochaid Sguideil), Cromarty (Cromba), Culloden (Cul Lodan / Cùil-lodair), Cawdor, Croy
- Dalwhinnie (Dail Chuinnidh), Dingwall (Inbhir Pheofharain), Dornie (An Dòrnaidh), Dornoch (Dòrnach), Drumnadrochit (Druim na Droichaid), Dulnain Bridge (Drochaid Thulnain), Dunvegan (Dùn Bheagain), Durness (Diuranais), Duror (of Appin) (Aphainn Duror)
- Fearn (Manachainn Rois), Fort Augustus (Cill Chuimein), Fortrose (A' Chananaich), Fort William (An Gearasdan)
- Gairloch (Geàrrloch), Glencoe (Gleann Comhann), Glenfinnan (Gleann Fionnan), Golspie (Goillspidh), Grantown-on-Spey (Baile nan Granndach)
- Helmsdale (Bun Ilidh)
- Invergarry (Inbhir Garadh), Invergordon (Inbhir Ghòrdain), Inverie (Inbhir Iodh), Invermoriston (Inbhir Mhoireastain), Inverness (Inbhir Nis)
- John o' Groats (Taigh Iain Ghròt)
- Kiltarlity (Bràigh na h-Àirde), Kingussie (Ceann a' Ghiùbhsaich), Kinlochbervie (Ceann Loch Biorbhaidh), Kinlochleven (Ceann Loch Lìobhann), Knoydart (Cnòideart), Kyle of Lochalsh (Caol Loch Aillse)
- Lochcarron (Loch Carrann), Lochinver (Loch an Inbhir)
- Mallaig (Malaig), Maryburgh (Baile Màiri), Muir of Ord (Am Blàr dubh)
- Nairn (Inbhir Narann), Newtonmore (Baile Ùr an t-Slèibh)
- North Ballachulish (Baile a' Chaolais air Tuath)
- Onich (Omhanaich)
- Plockton (Am Ploc), Portmahomack (Port Mo-Chalmaig), Portree (Port Rìgh)
- Rosemarkie (Ros Maircnidh), Roy Bridge (An Drochaid Ruaraidh)
- Spean Bridge (An Droichaid Spean), Strathpeffer (Srath Pheofhair), Strontian (Sròn an t-Sìthein)
- Tain (Baile Dhubhthaich), Thurso (Inbhir Theòrsa), Tongue (Tunga), Torridon (Toirbheartan)
- Ullapool (Ullapul)
- Wick (Inbhir Ùige)

== See also ==
- Scottish Highlands
- List of places in Highland (council area)
- List of places in Argyll and Bute
- List of places in Perth and Kinross
- List of places in Moray
- List of places in the Western Isles
- High Life Highland
