= Battle of Daltullich =

1499 battle of the Scottish clan wars

- Part of the Scottish clan wars
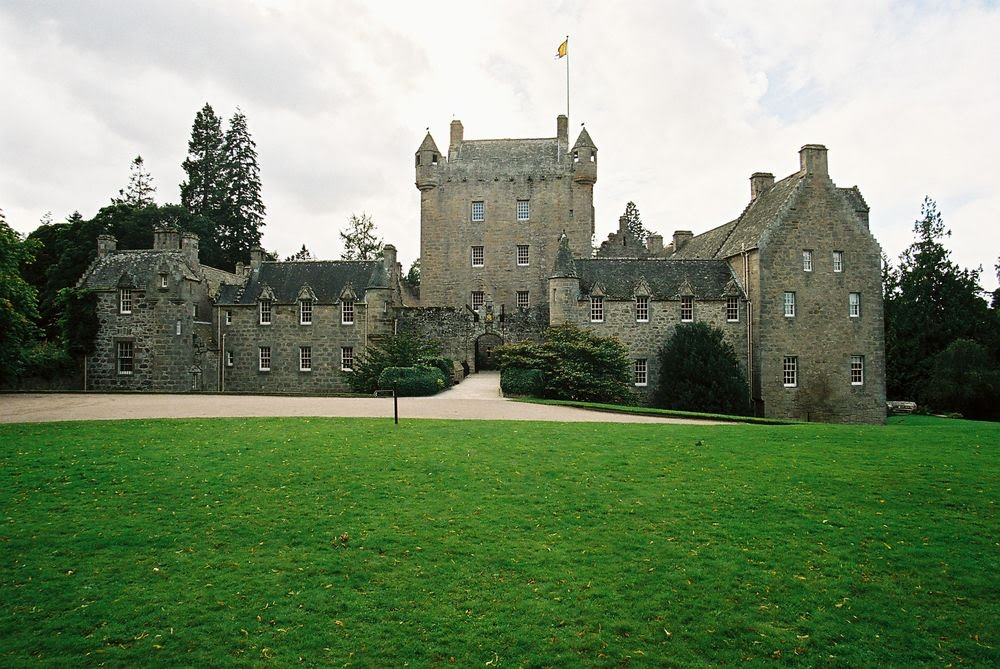
- Cawdor Castle, the historic seat of the chiefs of Clan Calder and later the seat of the Campbells of Cawdor
Date	1499
Location	Daltullich, Strathnairn, Scotland
Result	Strategic Campbell victory as heiress not recovered by the Calders; Tactical Calder victory as Campbells forced to retreat

Belligerents
Clan Campbell	Clan Calder

Commanders and leaders
Campbell of Inverliver	Hugh Calder; Alexander Calder

Strength
Sixty men	

Casualties and losses
Six, or seven, or eight, sons of Campbell of Inverliver killed	Unknown

The Battle of Daltullich was a Scottish clan battle that took place in the autumn of 1499 at a place called Daltullich which is near to Strathnairn in the Scottish Highlands. It was fought between men of the Clan Calder and Clan Campbell. The heiress to the chiefship of the Clan Calder, Muriel, was carried away as agreed by men of the Clan Campbell to marry into the Campbell family, but they were pursued by her paternal uncles who tried to prevent this from happening.

== Background ==
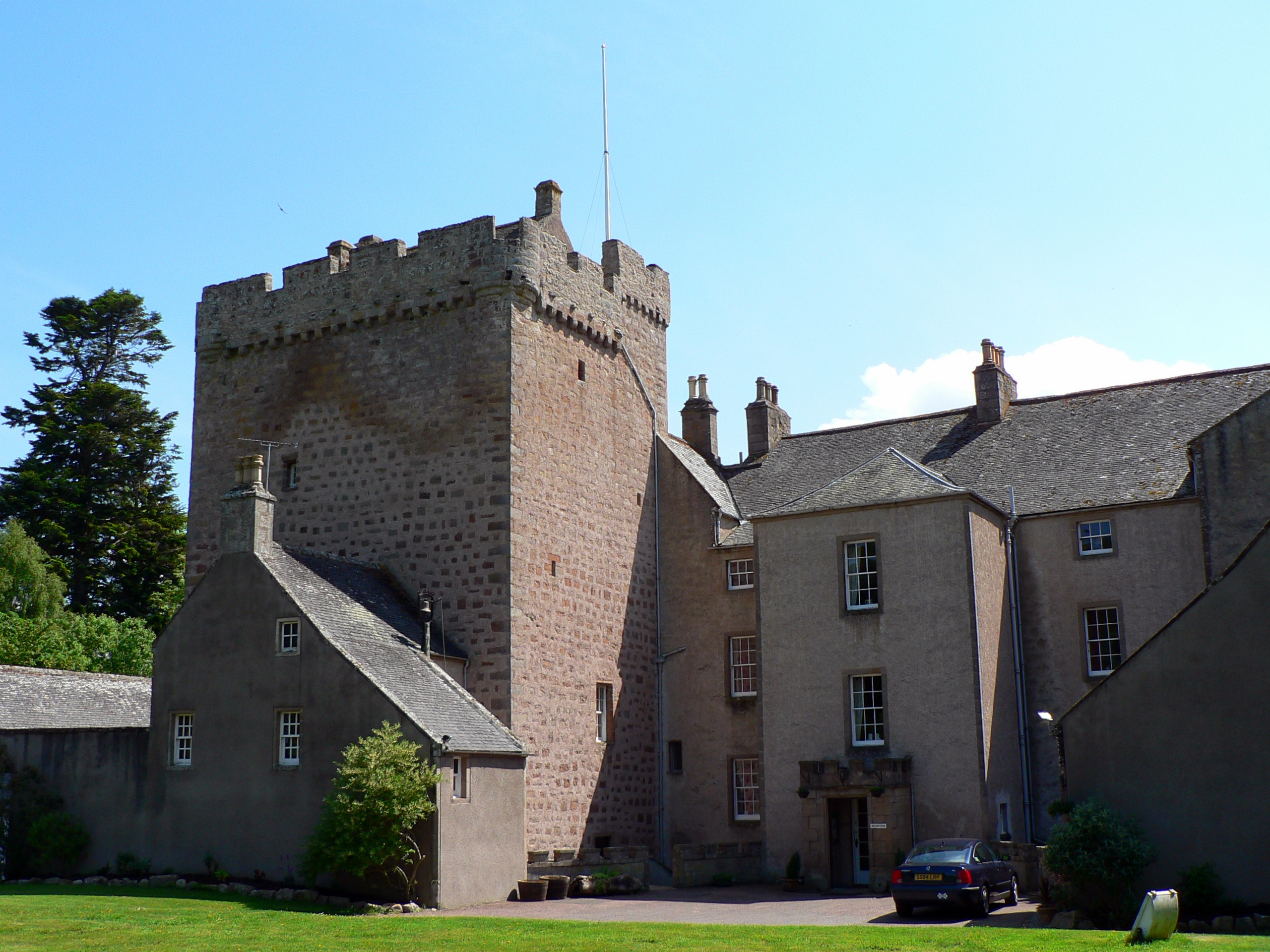
Kilravock Castle

The Thane of Cawdor, chief of Clan Calder's son, John Calder, predeceased him but left two daughters of his own, Janet and Muriel. There is some obscurity regarding Janet and Muriel was born after their father had died but survived to claim the succession. The old Thane then tried to have Muriel set aside and for one of his other sons to be placed in the succession. If an entail that had been made in 1488 had stood then the estates would have reverted to the nearest male heir of the Calders. However, as the old Thane had made another entail on his son John, the father of Muriel, and against his eldest son William, he had by royal charter secured the succession to either his male or female issue.

Muriel was the maternal granddaughter of Rose of Kilravock Castle who initially intended to marry her to one of his grandsons. However, Rose of Kilravrock was being prosecuted by the laird of Cromartie for the spoil of his lands via Archibald Campbell, 2nd Earl of Argyll who was the justice-general for the whole of Scotland and to make the process easier Kilravrock agreed to deliver his grandchild Muriel to Argyll. In pursuance of this agreement the ward of marriage of Muriel was granted to Argyll, "by the king's gift", on 16 January 1495. She was kept in the house of Kilravrock and Argyll granted to him a bond of maintenance and friendship dated 1 February 1499.

== The battle ==
In the autumn of 1499, Argyll sent Campbell of Inverliver, with sixty men, to receive the child and send her south to be schooled, or to be brought to Inveraray Castle. As Inverliver was travelling on his way with Muriel, at Daltullich, close to Strathnairn, he found himself being pursued by Muriel's paternal uncles, Alexander and Hugh Calder, who had a superior force. Inverliver sent Muriel off with six men and turned to stop the Calders. To deceive the Calders a sheaf of corn was dressed in some of the child's clothes and kept at the rear. The conflict was sharp and there was considerable loss of life. Among those killed were six, or eight, of Campbell of Inverliver's sons. When he thought that Muriel was out of reach of her uncles he retreated leaving the fake child to the pursuers. Another account of the battle states that Campbell of Inverliver had inverted a large camp kettle as if to conceal Muriel and that he then ordered his seven sons to defend it to the death while he hurried on with the girl. The seven sons were all killed but when the Calders lifted up the camp kettle there was no Muriel there and Campbell had gained so much time that further pursuit was useless.

Campbell of Inverliver apparently said the following in Scottish Gaelic during the battle:

S fhada glaodh o' Lochow, 's fhada cobhair o' chlann dhaoine

Which translates in English as:

Tis a far cry from Lochow, and a distant help from the children of my people

== Aftermath ==
Coat of arms of the Earl Cawdor

For his success, Campbell of Inverliver was rewarded with the £20 land of Inverliver. According to tradition, upon Muriel being seized a nurse bit off a joint in her little finger in order to mark her identity. Upon the Campbells being congratulated on their safe arrival, someone asked what should be done if Muriel died before she became of marriageable age, to which Campbell of Auchinbreck replied that "she can never die, as long as a red-haired lassie can be found on either side of Loch Awe". A legal fight ensued and in 1502 Muriel's right as heiress was established in law. The following year the old Thane of Cawdor died leaving his sons to carry on the quarrel for some time. In 1510, Muriel was married to Sir John Campbell who was the second or third son of Argyll. Sir John Campbell then received the estate of Calder, and his and Muriel's descendants are the Earls Cawdor and the chieftains of the Clan Campbell of Cawdor. In memory of the marriage, in the old hall of Cawdor Castle is cut, "S.I.C" and "D.M.C", with the inscription "Ceri manimemineris mane". Another interpretation of this is that it says "S.J.C" (Sir John Campbell) and "M.C" (Muriel Calder) but from the style of the carvings it appears that it was from a later generation.

John Calder, the Precentor of Ross, came to the assistance of the Calders with the intention of maintaining the old line. William Calder, Vicar of Barivan who was the eldest son of the old Thane, successfully claimed the lands of Little Urchany. John Calder the Precentor also secured the lands in the burgh of Nairn that belonged to the Calders for his nephew, William Calder the Vicar. The Calders of Asswanly had also received lands near Elgin in 1440.
