= Hugh John Vaughan Campbell, 6th Earl Cawdor =

Scottish peer and landowner

The Right Honourable The Earl Cawdor

Member of the House of Lords Lord Temporal
- In office 1970–1993
- Preceded by: The 5th Earl Cawdor
- Succeeded by: The 7th Earl Cawdor

Personal details
- Born: 6 September 1932
- Died: 20 June 1993 (aged 60)
- Spouse: Cathryn Hinde (m. 1956–1979) Countess Angelika Lazansky von Bukowa (m. 1979)
- Children: Lady Emma Campbell; Lady Elizabeth Campbell; Colin Campbell, 7th Earl Cawdor; The Hon. Frederick Campbell; Lady Laura Campbell
- Parents: John Campbell, 5th Earl Cawdor (father); Wilma Mairi Vickers (mother)
- Relatives: Clan Campbell of Cawdor
- Education: Eton College; Magdalen College; Royal Agricultural University
- Occupation: landowner, politician

Hugh John Vaughan Campbell, 6th Earl Cawdor (6 September 1932 – 20 June 1993), was a Scottish peer and landowner, a member of the House of Lords from 1970 until his death.

== Biography ==
Campbell was the son of John Campbell, 5th Earl Cawdor, and Wilma Mairi Vickers. He studied at Eton College, Magdalen College, Oxford, and the Royal Agricultural College, Cirencester.

He held the office of High Sheriff of Carmarthenshire in 1964. Although Scottish, he lived at Golden Grove, Llandeilo, in Wales, until his father's death in 1970, when he inherited the family estates in Scotland, some 50,000 acres.

== Marriages and children ==
Lord Cawdor was married firstly on 19 January 1956 to Cathryn Hinde, daughter of Major-General Sir Robert Hinde DSO KBE CB, and his wife Evelyn Muriel Wright. They had five children:

- Lady Emma Clare Campbell (born 15 March 1958); married David Marrian on 29 January 1983, and has three sons.
- Lady Elizabeth Campbell (born 24 September 1959); married William Robert Charles Athill in 1990, and has one daughter and one son. Their daughter, Storm, married Richard Hollingsworth in September 2021.
- Colin Robert Vaughan Campbell, 7th Earl Cawdor (born 30 June 1962); married Lady Isabella Rachel Stanhope, daughter of William Stanhope, 11th Earl of Harrington, on 21 October 1994, and had issue, including Lady Jean Campbell.
- Hon. Frederick William Campbell (born 29 July 1965); married Katherine J. M. Barrett on 7 December 1996, and has one daughter and two sons, Imogen Grace Campbell (born 23 September 1999), Jasper Hugh Campbell (born 26 September 2000), and Archie Elidor Campbell (born 5 September 2006).
- Lady Laura Jane Campbell (born 26 December 1966); married Adam Hall in 2000, divorced in 2013.

Lord Cawdor and Cathryn Hinde were divorced in 1979 and he was married secondly to Countess Angelika Lazansky von Bukowa on 28 December 1979. She is an advocate for organic gardening and farming. There were no children of the second marriage.

Lord Cawdor died on 20 June 1993. He caused controversy by leaving Cawdor Castle to his second wife rather than his heir. One of his daughters, Lady Elizabeth (Liza), published her memoir of him in 2006, called Title Deeds: a Work of Friction. A selection from his commonplace book titled Thistles in Aspic was also published in 2000.

Peerage of the United Kingdom
Preceded by John Duncan Vaughan Campbell	Earl Cawdor; 1970–1993	Succeeded by Colin Robert Vaughan Campbell
