= Thane of Cawdor =

Title

Thane of Cawdor is a title in the Scottish nobility, allotted to the thane, or lord, of the village of Cawdor. The current 7th Earl Cawdor, of Clan Campbell of Cawdor, is the 25th Thane of Cawdor.

In William Shakespeare's play Macbeth, this title was given to Macbeth after the previous Thane of Cawdor was captured and executed for treason against King Duncan. Macbeth hears a prophecy of his new thaneship from the Three Witches shortly before receiving word of the matter from Duncan, such that while the rule of Cawdor may be inconsequential itself it nonetheless proves the inevitability of the Witches' secondary prediction of Macbeth's ascent to become King of Scotland. The historical King Macbeth fought a Thane of Cawdor who died in battle, but he did not thereby acquire the title himself.

The 2nd Earl Cawdor wrote a history of the Thanes of Cawdor, published in 1859. According to the 2nd Earl, the first thane was originally a Celtic chieftain who allied with the King of Scots at a time lost to the historical record.

== See also ==
- Thane of Calder
