= Liza Campbell =

British artist and writer

Lady Elizabeth Campbell
- Campbell in 2006
- Born: Lady Elizabeth Campbell; 24 September 1959 (age 66); Cawdor Castle, Scotland
- Education: Chelsea College of Art & Design
- Occupations: Artist, calligrapher, columnist, writer
- Spouse: William Athill (m. 1990, divorced)
- Partner: Imran Khan (former partner)
- Children: 2
- Parents: Hugh Campbell, 6th Earl Cawdor (father); Cathryn Hinde (mother)

Lady Elizabeth Campbell (born 24 September 1959), known professionally as Liza Campbell, is a Scottish artist, calligrapher, columnist, and writer. She is the second daughter of Hugh Campbell, 6th Earl Cawdor (1932–1993), by his first wife, the former Cathryn Hinde. She is the last child of an Earl Cawdor to have been born at Cawdor Castle, which has previously been erroneously associated with Shakespeare's Macbeth. Campbell was raised in Cawdor Castle during the Sixties, and studied art at Chelsea. She lived in Mauritius, Kenya (Nairobi) and in Indonesia between 1990 and 1996.

== Career ==
As an artist, Liza Campbell worked in an art gallery, and has had exhibitions of engraved soapstone at All Saints Gallery, Babbington House and the Sladmore Gallery. More recently, she has shown collages at the Michael Naimski Gallery and had exhibitions at the Rebecca Hossack Art Gallery.

For four years, from 2000, she wrote a back page column Adventures of a Past It Girl.

== Family ==
Campbell was the second of five children, and the second daughter of three daughters. Her parents divorced in 1979 after 22 years of marriage.

She dated Pakistani cricketer (later Pakistan prime minister) Imran Khan for several years. In 1990, she married William Robert Charles "Willie" Athill, a big-game fisherman, with whom she lived on a desert island for two years. By that marriage, she has two children, a daughter Storm (b. 1990) and a son Atticus (b. 1992). She is now divorced from Athill, the marriage having broken down in 1993. Her daughter married Richard Hollingsworth in September 2021.

On 22 June 2013 the New York Times quoted Campbell in an article that described the law of primogeniture as a legacy instance of sexism, "The posh aspect of it blinds people to what is essentially sexism in a privileged minority, where girls are born less than boys." Campbell noted that she loved her younger brother, Colin Campbell, but called his inheritance of the title and estate a peculiar situation. Campbell quoted her father's advice on auto safety -- "Remember to wear a safety belt, because your face is your fortune."

== See also ==
- Cawdor Castle
- Earls Cawdor
