= Earl Cawdor =

Title in the Peerage of the United Kingdom

Earldom of Cawdor
- Creation date: 5 October 1827
- Created by: King George IV
- Peerage: Peerage of the United Kingdom
- First holder: John Campbell, 1st Earl Cawdor
- Present holder: Colin Campbell, 7th Earl Cawdor
- Heir apparent: James Campbell, Viscount Emlyn
- Remainder to: The 1st Earl's heirs male of the body lawfully begotten
- Subsidiary titles: Viscount Emlyn; Baron Cawdor
- Status: Extant
- Seat: Cawdor Castle
- Former seat: Stackpole Court
- Motto: Over the crest: Candidus cantabit moriens (The pure of heart shall sing when dying); Under the shield: "Be Mindful"
- Arms: Quarterly 1st Or a Hart's Head caboshed Sable, attired Gules (Cawder); 2nd Gyronny of eight Or and Sable (Campbell); 3rd Argent a Lymphad, sails furled Sable, flagged Gules (Lorne); 4th parted per fess Azure and Gules, a cross Or (Lort).

Earl Cawdor, of Castlemartin in the County of Pembroke, is a title in the Peerage of the United Kingdom. It was created in 1827 for the politician John Campbell, 2nd Baron Cawdor.

This Welsh branch of Clan Campbell of Cawdor descends from Sir John Campbell (died 1546), third son of Archibald Campbell, 2nd Earl of Argyll (whose eldest son Colin was the ancestor of the Dukes of Argyll; see the latter title for earlier history of the family). His descendant Pryse Campbell (d. 1768) represented Nairnshire in the House of Commons. His son John Campbell was Member of Parliament for Nairnshire and Cardigan. In 1796, he was raised to the Peerage of Great Britain as Baron Cawdor, of Castlemartin in the County of Pembroke.

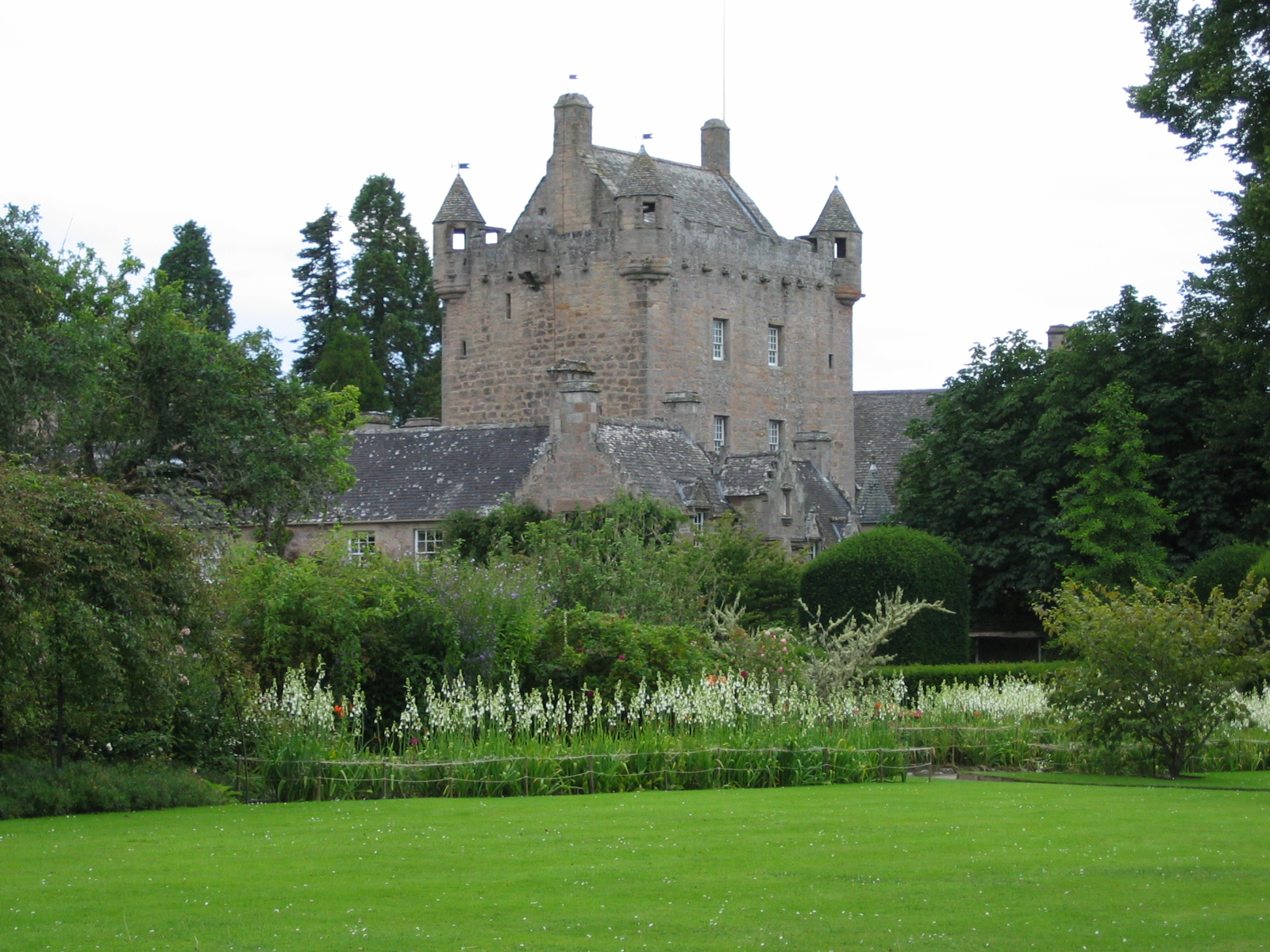
Cawdor Castle, Scotland.

He was succeeded by his eldest son, the second Baron. He represented Carmarthenshire in Parliament and served as Lord Lieutenant of Carmarthenshire. In 1827, he was created Viscount Emlyn, of Emlyn in the County of Carmarthen, and Earl Cawdor, of Castlemartin in the County of Pembroke. These titles were in the Peerage of the United Kingdom. His son, the second Earl, was Member of Parliament for Pembrokeshire and Lord Lieutenant of Carmarthenshire. He was succeeded by his eldest son, the third Earl. He was a Conservative politician and served briefly as First Lord of the Admiralty in 1905. Lord Cawdor was also Lord Lieutenant of Pembrokeshire and Chairman of the Great Western Railway.

The titles are held by the seventh Earl, who succeeded his father in 1993. He is also the 25th Thane of Cawdor.

Several other members of this branch of the Campbell family may be mentioned. Sir George Campbell, younger brother of the first Baron, was an admiral in the Royal Navy. The Hon. George Pryse Campbell, second son of the first Baron, was a rear-admiral in the Royal Navy. Brigadier-General John Vaughan Campbell, who was awarded the Victoria Cross in 1916, was the second son of Captain the Hon. Ronald George Elidor Campbell, second son of the second Earl. Colonel the Hon. Ian Malcoln Campbell, third son of the third Earl, was Lord Lieutenant of Nairnshire. Liza Campbell is the second daughter of the sixth Earl.

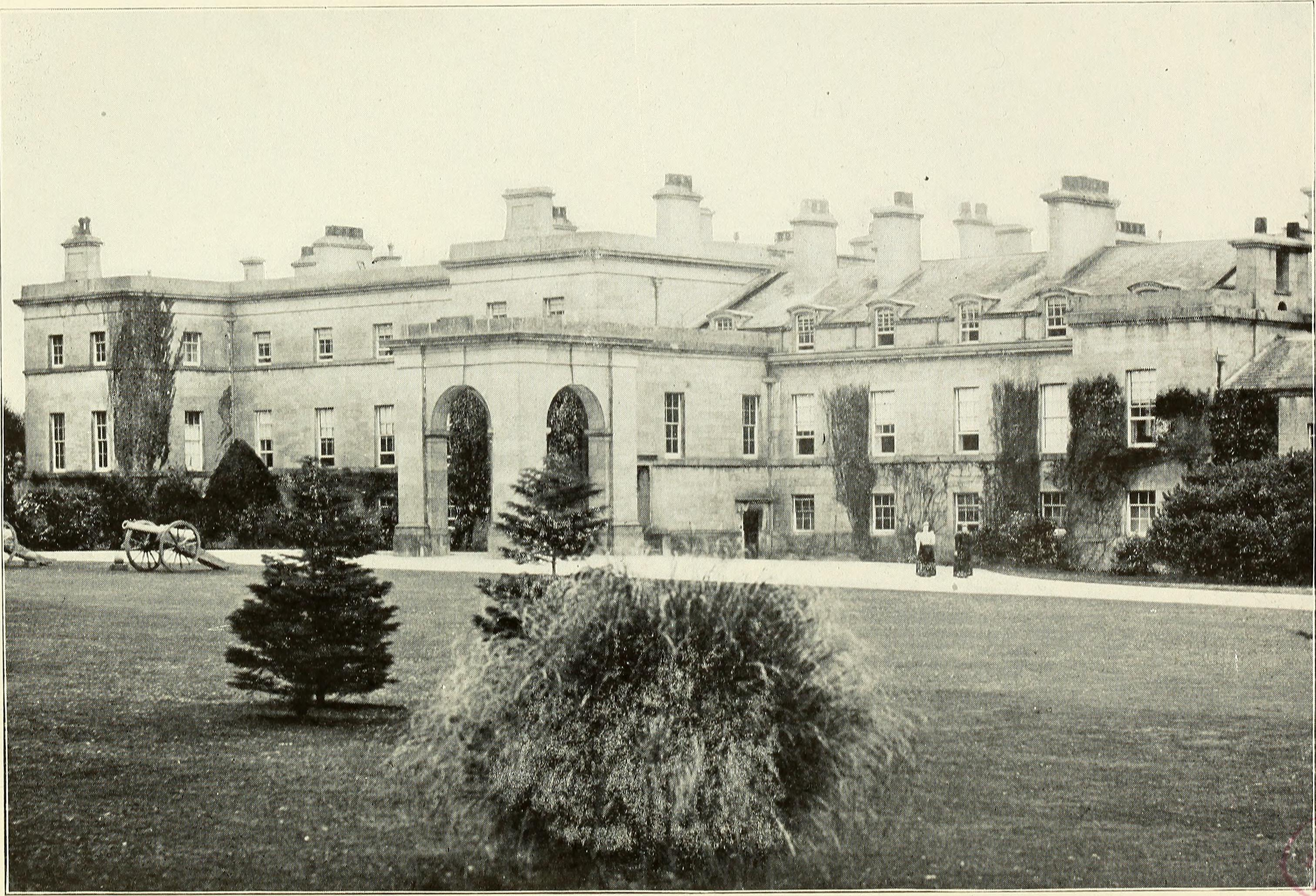
Stackpole Court, Pembrokeshire, Wales.

The family seat is Cawdor Castle near Cawdor, Nairnshire, associated also with the ancient title Thane of Cawdor. Other family seats in the past included Golden Grove in Carmarthenshire, Wales, which was bequeathed to John Campbell, 1st Earl Cawdor by his friend, John Vaughan, after his death in 1804, and also Stackpole Court in Pembrokeshire, Wales, acquired by the marriage of Alexander Campbell to Elizabeth Lort.

== Barons Cawdor (1796) ==
- John Campbell, 1st Baron Cawdor (1753–1821)
- John Frederick Campbell, 2nd Baron Cawdor (1790–1860) (created Earl Cawdor in 1827)

== Earls Cawdor (1827) ==
- John Frederick Campbell, 1st Earl Cawdor (1790–1860)
- John Frederick Vaughan Campbell, 2nd Earl Cawdor (1817–1898)
- Frederick Archibald Vaughan Campbell, 3rd Earl Cawdor (1847–1911)
- Hugh Frederick Vaughan Campbell, 4th Earl Cawdor (1870–1914)
- John Duncan Vaughan Campbell, 5th Earl Cawdor (1900–1970)
- Hugh John Vaughan Campbell, 6th Earl Cawdor (1932–1993)
- Colin Robert Vaughan Campbell, 7th Earl Cawdor (b. 1962)

The heir apparent is the present holder's son James Chester Campbell, Viscount Emlyn (b. 1998).

== See also ==
- Duke of Argyll
- Clan Campbell
