= Isabella Campbell, Countess Cawdor =

British fashion editor

The Right Honourable The Countess Cawdor

Personal details
- Born: Lady Isabella Rachel Stanhope; 11 October 1966 Patrickswell, County Limerick, Ireland
- Spouse: Colin Campbell, 7th Earl Cawdor (m. 1994)
- Children: Lady Jean Campbell; James Chester Campbell, Viscount Emlyn; Lady Eleanor Campbell; Lady Beatrice Campbell
- Parents: William Stanhope, 11th Earl of Harrington (father); Priscilla Margaret Cubitt (mother)
- Relatives: Stanhope (by birth); Clan Campbell of Cawdor (by marriage)
- Occupation: editor, stylist, interior decorator

Isabella Campbell, Countess Cawdor (née Lady Isabella Rachel Stanhope; born 11 October 1966) is a British fashion editor, stylist, and interior decorator. She was a former fashion editor at British Vogue.

== Early life and family ==
Lady Isabella Stanhope was born in 1966 at the Greenmount estate in Patrickswell, County Limerick, Ireland, to William Stanhope, 11th Earl of Harrington and his third wife, Priscilla Margaret Cubitt. She grew up in Ballingarry, County Limerick.

== Career ==
Lady Isabella worked as a fashion editor for British Vogue. She also worked as a designer for Holland & Holland, partnering with Stella Tennant.

After her marriage, she worked in freelance projects with Bruce Weber, Mario Testino, and Annie Leibovitz. She also works as a landlord and property manager over the rental properties on the Cawdor family estate. She runs a location and production company from Cawdor, organising photo shoots for magazines, ordering props for photo shoots, and casting actors for films.

== Personal life ==
Lady Isabella married Colin Campbell, 7th Earl Cawdor on 21 October 1994 at St. Nicholas Church, Adare. They live in Cawdor Castle and have four children:

- Lady Jean Campbell (b. 1997)
- James Chester Campbell, Viscount Emlyn (b. 1998)
- Lady Eleanor Campbell (b. 2000)
- Lady Beatrice Campbell (b. 2004)

In 2007, Vogue considered Lady Cawdor and her husband to be among the best-dressed couples in the United Kingdom.
