= Angelika Campbell, Countess Cawdor =

Czech-British aristocrat

The Right Honourable The Dowager Countess Cawdor

Personal details
- Born: Angelika Ilona Gräfin Lazansky von Bukowa; 17 February 1944 (age 82) Chyše, Bohemia and Moravia
- Spouse: Hugh John Vaughan Campbell, 6th Earl Cawdor (m. 1979–1993)
- Parents: Count Prokop Lažanský z Bukové (father); Countess Ingeborg von Königswald (mother)
- Relatives: Lazansky (by birth); Clan Campbell of Cawdor (by marriage)
- Occupation: horticulturist, landowner

Angelika Campbell, Countess Cawdor (née Countess Angelika Ilona Lazansky von Bukowa; born 17 February 1944), also known as Angelika Lažanská z Bukové a Chyše, is a Czech-British horticulturist, landowner and aristocrat. She is the second wife of the late Hugh John Vaughan Campbell, 6th Earl Cawdor.

== Early life ==
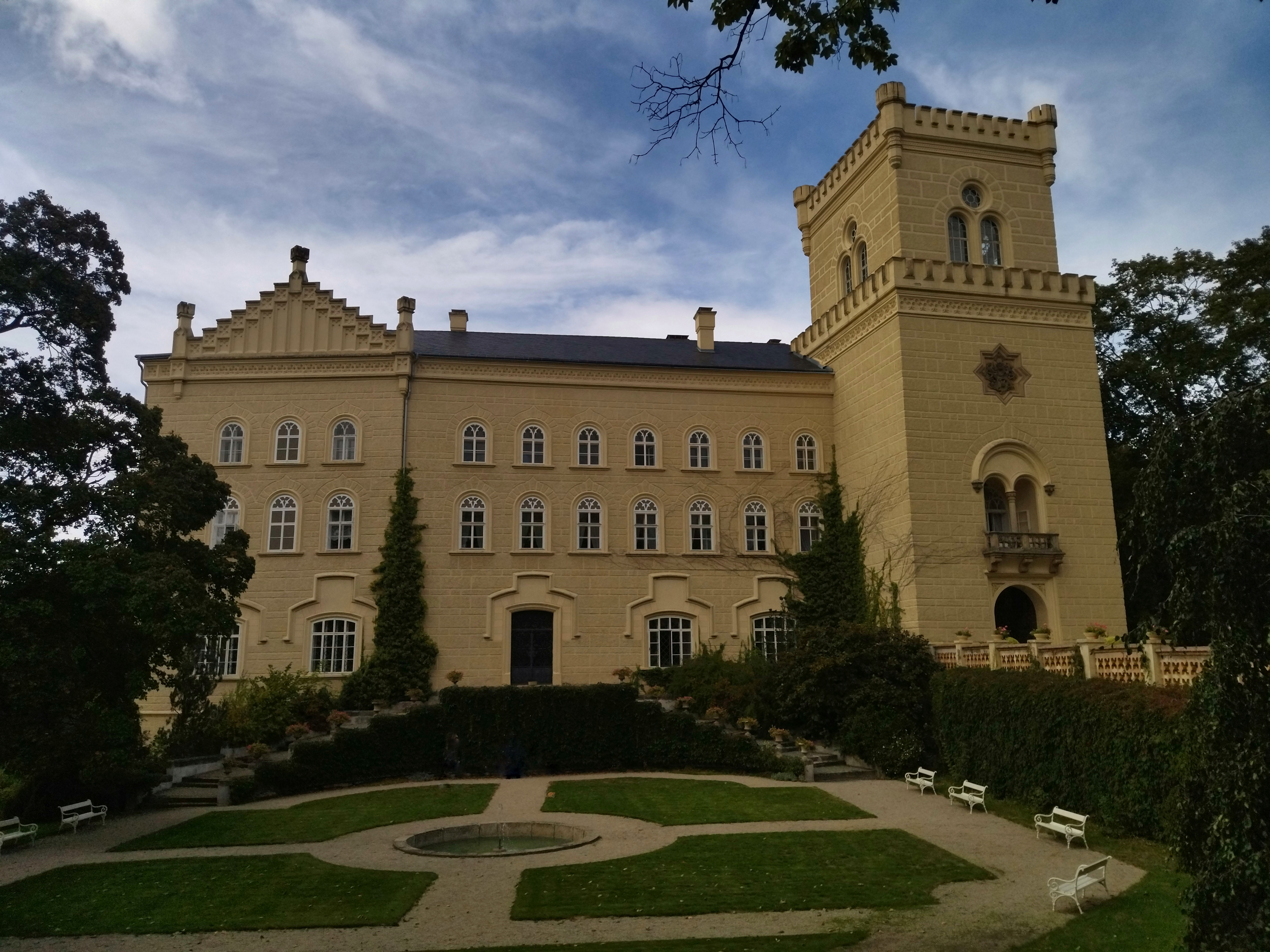
Chyše Castle, Lady Cawdor's birthplace

Lady Cawdor was born Countess Angelika Ilona Lazansky von Bukowa (Czech: Lažanská z Bukové a Chyše) on 17 February 1944 at her family's castle in Chyše. Her father, Count Prokop Lažanský z Bukové, was a Bohemian landowner and her mother, Countess Ingeborg von Königswald, was a German aviator. She has one sister, Countess Mechtilda.

Following Nazi occupation of Czechoslovakia, her father accepted German citizenship. In 1945, following the end of World War II, her family was expelled from Czechoslovakia by the Beneš decrees. They settled in Southern Rhodesia, where her father died in 1969.

== Adult life ==
In the 1960s, Lady Cawdor returned to Czechoslovakia to visit her childhood home. After the Velvet Revolution in 1989, she returned again to find the castle in disrepair following forty years of management by the socialist government. In 1996, her distant cousin, Count Vladimír Lažanský, purchased the castle and renovated it. Lady Cawdor and her sister visited in 2011 and helped restore the chapel, which was established in 1833 by her great-grandmother, Countess Terezie Lažanská.

On 28 December 1979, she married the divorcé Hugh John Vaughan Campbell, 6th Earl Cawdor. She was Lord Cawdor's second wife. Upon her marriage, she took up residence at Cawdor Castle, her husband's Scottish estate in Nairnshire. Lady Cawdor is a proponent of organic farming and managed the gardens and farms on the Cawdor estate. The castle is open to tourists.

Her husband died in 1993 and left the Cawdor estate to Lady Cawdor instead of to his eldest son, Colin Campbell, 7th Earl Cawdor. In the spring of 2022, she prevented the estate from undertaking agricultural projects involving genetically modified crops. That October, Lady Cawdor resigned from Cawdor Castle Tourism following a family dispute. In November 2002, she tried to have her stepson and his family evicted from the estate after they took up residence in the castle while she was on holiday in the United States. A judge ruled that she could evict her step-grandchildren from the property but not her stepson. Ultimately, her stepson and his family left the castle and settled at Drynachan Lodge on the estate.

In 2021, she sold sixty-eight acres of land on the estate.
