= Thane of Calder =

Historic title of Scottish nobility

Coat of arms of the last chief of Clan Calder, the Thane of Calder

Thane of Calder was a title of nobility in the Kingdom of Scotland.

Hugh de Cadella (or Kaledouer) was a French nobleman mentioned in David Hume of Godscroft's "The history of the house of Douglas" who gave influential support to Malcolm III of Scotland and was given lands in Nairn, which were renamed Calder. In 1310 CE, Robert the Bruce granted a charter of land to William, Thane of Calder for a yearly payment of "12 merks". The last Thane of Calder, John, died in 1494, leaving a daughter, Muriel, who surrendered the thaneship to her grandson John Cambell, who formed the Clan Campbell of Cawdor.

Macbeth, in Shakespeare's play of the same name, becomes Thane of Cawdor early in the narrative. Shakespeare's version (and the tradition which came before it) is of extremely dubious historical authenticity. Cawdor Castle was originally named Calder and was first built by William Calder, 6th Thane of Calder.

== See also ==
- Thane of Fife
- Thane (Scotland)
