= Cawdor =

Village and parish in Scotland

Coordinates: 57.51352°N 3.92693°W

Cawdor: Scottish Gaelic: Caladair
- Location within the Inverness area
- OS grid reference: NH846486
- Council area: Highland
- Country: Scotland
- Sovereign state: United Kingdom
- Post town: Nairn
- Postcode district: IV12 5
- Police: Scotland
- Fire: Scottish
- Ambulance: Scottish
- UK Parliament: Moray West, Nairn and Strathspey
- Scottish Parliament: Inverness and Nairn

Cawdor (Scottish Gaelic: Caladair) is a village and parish in the Highland council area, Scotland. The village is 5 miles (8 kilometres) south-southwest of Nairn and 12 miles (19 kilometres) east of Inverness. The village is in the Historic County of Nairnshire.

== History ==
The village is the location of Cawdor Castle, the seat of the Earl Cawdor. A massive keep with small turrets is the original portion of the castle, and to it were added, in the 17th century, later buildings forming two sides of a square.

Macbeth, in Shakespeare's play of the same name, becomes Thane of Cawdor early in the narrative. However, since the oldest part of the castle's structure dates from the late 14th century, and has no predecessor, Shakespeare's version's historical authenticity is dubious.

The name "Cawdor" is the English pronunciation and spelling of the ancient and original name Calder. In the early 19th century, the Lord at the time was residing in England and changed the name of the castle, town and clan overnight so that it would match the Shakespearian designation.

=== Roman fort ===
In 1984, a strong candidate for a Roman fort was identified at Easter Galcantray, south west of Cawdor, by aerial photography.

The site was excavated between 1985 and 1988 and several features were identified which are of this classification.

A single fragment of Roman coarse ware was found in the bottom of the ditch outside the south-west gateway along with burnt material; this pottery has very similar fabric to that found at Inchtuthil. In addition to this sparse pottery evidence, the demolition deposits in the western ditch yielded a piece of charcoal which has been radiocarbon dated to A.D. 80-130 (Calibrated).

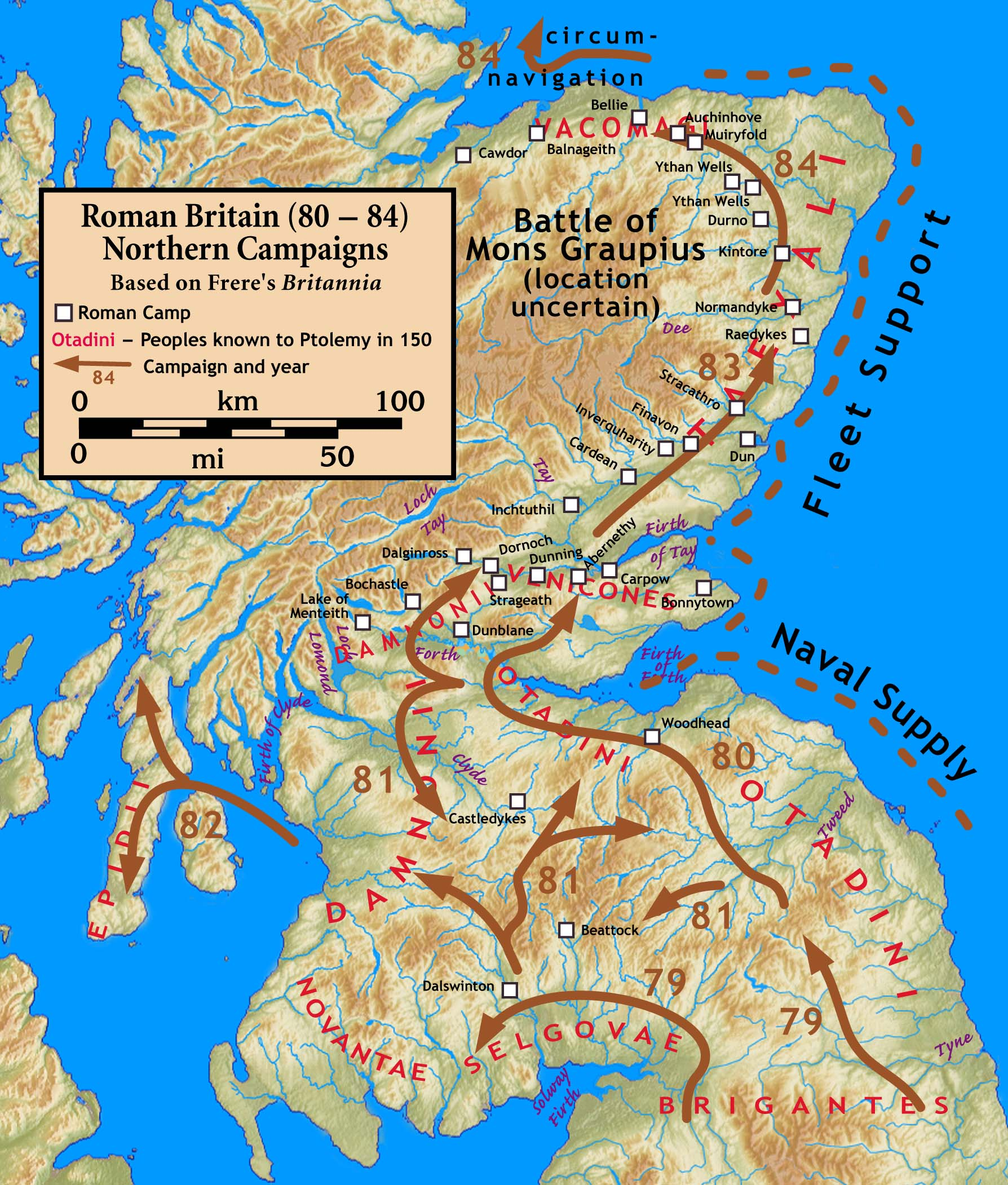
Map showing Cawdor in 84 AD

The radiocarbon test gave a possible date of construction during the Agricola campaign.

== See also ==
- Royal Brackla distillery
