= Asloun Castle =

- Near Alford, Aberdeenshire, Scotland grid reference NJ932297
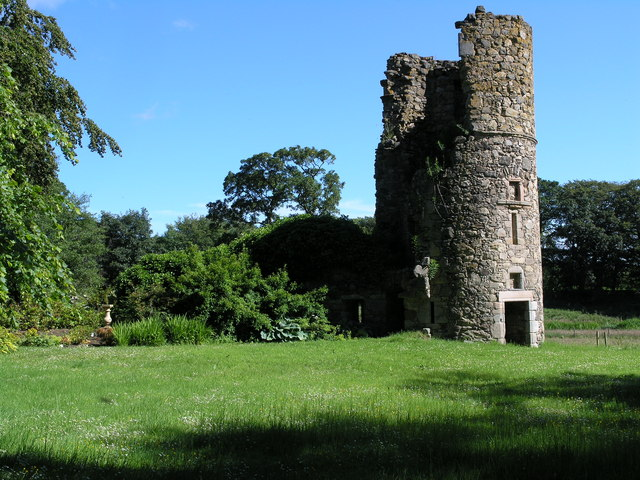
- Ruins of Asloun Castle

Site information
- Condition: Ruined

Location
- Coordinates: 57.2227°N 2.7585°W

Site history
- Built: 16th century

Scheduled monument
- Official name: Asloun Castle
- Type: Secular: castle; round tower
- Designated: 16 February 2006
- Reference no.: SM11392

Asloun Castle is the remains of a 16th-century Z-plan castle located 2 miles (3.2 km) south-west of Alford, in Aberdeenshire, Scotland, of which only one tower survives. It is just east of Castleton of Asloun, and north of the Strow burn.

The castle is also known as Asloon Castle. It is designated a protected scheduled monument.

== History ==
The castle was built by the Calder family, but later came into the possession of the Forbes family.

On the night before the battle of Alford in 1645, the Marquess of Montrose stayed at the castle.

According to the latest update in the Aberdeenshire Historic Environment Record, dated 31 May 2022, the entry notes that the remains are "being restored by present owners".

== Structure ==
The tower, which is three storeys high, has an entrance on the south side that served as the principal entrance to the castle. It was the south-east tower of the castle and contained a turnpike stair to the first floor. The ground floor of the hall was stone-vaulted.

There are round gun loops in the basement of the tower, while there are quirked roll mouldings on openings on upper levels. The upper floor of the tower appears to have provided private accommodation, accessible only from the main castle. This accommodation was lit by a large window.

There are two recesses for armorials, both now empty: one over the entrance and the other above a first-floor slit window.
