= Clan Calder =

Highland Scottish clan

- Motto: Be Mindful

Profile
- Region: Scottish Highlands
- District: Inverness
- Clan Calder no longer has a chief, and is an armigerous clan
- Historic seat: Cawdor Castle
Clan branches
Calder of Cawdor (historic chiefs)
Calder of Asswanly (senior cadets)
See also:Calder baronets
Allied clans
Clan Rose
Rival clans
Clan Campbell
Clan Campbell of Cawdor
Clan Rait
Titles
Thane of Calder

Clan Calder is a Highland Scottish clan. The clan is recognised by the Lord Lyon King of Arms but as it does not currently have a clan chief it is therefore considered an armigerous clan.

== History ==
=== Origins of the Clan ===
The name 'Calder' is thought to come from the early Common Brittonic, meaning 'hard or violent water' (the modern Welsh word for hard is "caled"), or possibly 'stony river'. It is found as a place name throughout Scotland. For example, East Calder and West Calder that are both near Edinburgh, and also Calderwood near Glasgow.

Historian William Anderson asserted that the name came to prominence in Scotland through a French knight called Hugo de Cadella, who was created Thane of Calder, later known as Cawdor. The historian George Fraser Black lists Hugo de Kaledouer as a witness to a charter of land near Montrose in around 1178. However, the name arose around Inverness where the Calders were great nobles with considerable lands from the fourteenth century onwards. The third Calder, Thane of Cawdor was however murdered by Sir Alexander Rait of nearby Rait Castle.

=== 15th and 16th centuries ===
The substantial tower that stands at the heart of Cawdor Castle was built by the Calders in about 1454. The Calders inter-married with other local families such as the powerful chiefs of Clan Rose, Barons of Kilravock. The Calder's ascendency however came to an end when Archibald Campbell, 2nd Earl of Argyll and chief of Clan Campbell was, along with Hugh Rose of Kilravock, appointed guardian to the infant Muriel Calder who was the female heir to the Calder family. Campbell was determined to remove the child to Inveraray so that she could be educated as part of his family. However, he was opposed by Murial's uncles, Alexander and Hugh Calder, who pursued the child and her Campbell escort into Strathnairn. The girl was safely delivered to Inverary but not without considerable loss of life: Campbell of Inverliver who led the kidnapping lost all six of his sons in the fighting as the Calders gave chase to recover the girl. Murial was the last of the Calder chief's family in the direct line. She was brought up as a Campbell and married Sir John Campbell, son of the Earl of Argyll. Murial died in about 1575 but her descendant, John Campbell of Cawdor, was raised to the peerage as Lord Cawdor in 1796, and his son was created the first Earl Cawdor in 1827. The present Earl Cawdor still lives in Cawdor Castle, seat of his Calder ancestors.

The name of Calder did not disappear and the Calders of Asswanly received lands near Elgin in 1440. In 1686 this family obtained a baronetcy of Nova Scotia. The most notable member of this branch of the clan was Robert Calder who saw substantial service in the Napoleonic Wars.

=== Modern history ===
During World War II Sir James Calder was an advisor to the Ministry of Supply. Calders are still found around Inverness today, for example Douglas Calder was President of the Royal Incorporation of Architects in Scotland and was also appointed director of planning for the newly created Highland Region in 1974.

== Castles ==
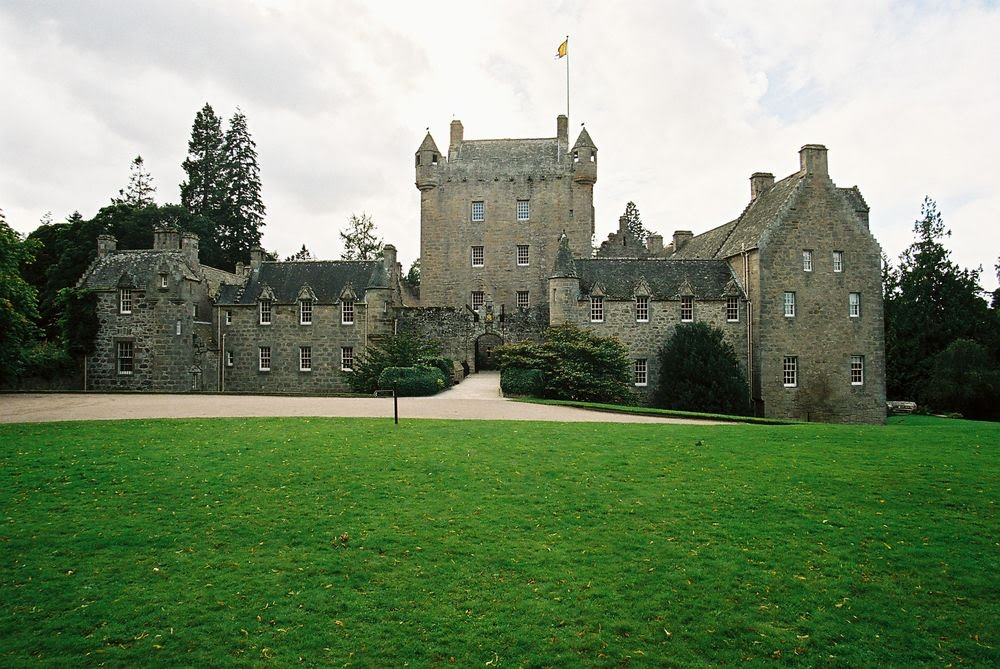
Cawdor Castle, historic seat of the chiefs of Clan Calder.

- Cawdor Castle, five miles south-west of Nairn. Much of the present castle was built by the Calders, with a large keep of four storeys that dates from the fourteenth century, and a courtyard enclosing ranges of buildings. The castle is reached by a drawbridge across a ditch.
- Nairn Castle dated from the twelfth century and was built by William the Lion. The keepers of the castle were the Calders as Thanes of Cawdor. The castle is another traditional place where Duncan was killed by Macbeth.
- Asloun Castle, two miles south-west of Alford, Aberdeenshire, was a Z-plan tower house of the sixteenth century but little remains. It was held by the Calders before passing to the Clan Forbes.
- Aswanley House, seven miles west of Huntly, was held by the Calders from 1440 and was sold in 1768 to the Duffs of Braco because of debt.

== See also ==
- Armigerous clan
- Scottish clan
