= John Campbell, 5th Earl Cawdor =

The Right Honourable The Earl Cawdor TD FSAScot FRGS

Member of the House of Lords Lord Temporal
- In office 1914–1970
- Preceded by: The 4th Earl Cawdor
- Succeeded by: The 6th Earl Cawdor

Personal details
- Born: 17 May 1900
- Died: 9 January 1970 (aged 69)
- Spouse: Wilma Mairi Vickers (m. 1929–1961) Elizabeth Topham Richardson (m. 1961)
- Children: Lady Caroline Campbell; Hugh Campbell, 6th Earl Cawdor; The Hon. James Campbell
- Parents: Hugh Campbell, 4th Earl Cawdor (father); Joan Thynne (mother)
- Relatives: Clan Campbell of Cawdor
- Occupation: landowner, military officer, politician

John Duncan Vaughan Campbell, 5th Earl Cawdor, TD FSAScot FRGS (17 May 1900 – 9 January 1970), styled Viscount Emlyn between 1911 and 1914, was a Scots-Welsh nobleman.

Campbell was the son of Hugh Campbell, 4th Earl Cawdor and Joan Emily Mary Thynne. He fought in the First World War, with the Royal Navy and was awarded the Territorial Decoration. He fought in World War II as a Lieutenant-Colonel and was mentioned in despatches. He was invested as a Fellow of the Royal Geographical Society, the Society of Antiquaries of Scotland and the Society of Antiquaries of London.

Lord Cawdor married, firstly, Wilma Mairi Vickers (1906–1982), daughter of Vincent Cartwright Vickers, on 15 May 1929. They had three children:

- Lady Caroline Mairi Campbell (1930–1977), had issue.
- Hugh John Vaughan Campbell, 6th Earl Cawdor (1932–1993), had issue.
- Hon. James Alexander Campbell (1942–2019), had issue, four daughters.

They were divorced in 1961. He married, secondly, Elizabeth Topham Richardson, daughter of John Topham Richardson (1850–1934) of Harps Oak, Merstham, Surrey, and Katharine Rose Richardson, née Smyth (1863–1945), on 29 June 1961.

Peerage of the United Kingdom
Preceded by Hugh Frederick Campbell	Earl Cawdor; 1914–1970	Succeeded by Hugh John Vaughan Campbell
