= John Campbell, 1st Baron Cawdor =

British politician and military officer (1753 – 1821)

The Right Honourable The Lord Cawdor FRS
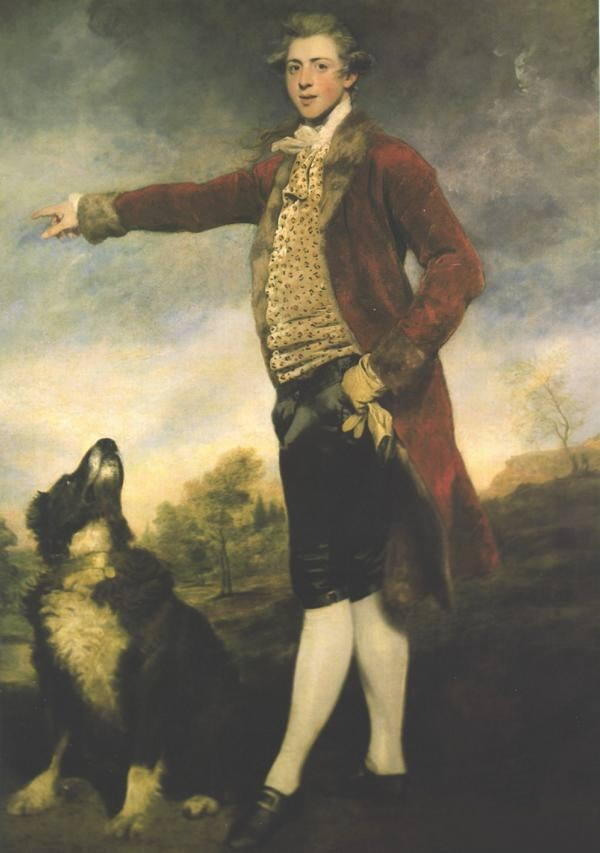
- Portrait by Sir Joshua Reynolds

Member of Parliament for Cardigan Boroughs
- In office 1780–1796

Member of Parliament for Nairnshire
- In office 1777–1780

Personal details
- Born: 1753 Wales
- Died: 1 June 1821 (aged 68) Bath, Somerset, UK
- Resting place: Bath Abbey
- Party: Pittite (from 1783)
- Other political affiliations: Whig (until 1783)
- Spouse: Isabella Caroline Howard
- Children: 2
- Education: Eton College
- Alma mater: Clare College, Cambridge

John Campbell, 1st Baron Cawdor, FRS, FSA (c. 1753 – 1 June 1821) was a British politician and military officer who sat in the House of Commons of Great Britain from 1777 to 1796.

== Biography ==
John Campbell was born in Wales c. 1753, the son of Pryse Campbell and Sarah Campbell (née Bacon). His siblings were Sarah, George, Alexander and Charles Campbell. He was sent to board at Eton College from 1763 to 1767 and afterwards studied at Clare College, Cambridge in 1772. His father died in 1768, so when his grandfather died in 1777 John inherited Stackpole Court in Pembrokeshire, his grandfather's other estates in Pembrokeshire and Nairn, and a mineral-producing estate in Cardiganshire; these lands and mines made him a rich man.

From 1777 to 1780 he was Member of Parliament for Nairnshire. He became Member of Parliament for Cardigan Boroughs from a by-election in June 1780 until he stood down at the 1796 British general election. From 1780 he was Governor of Milford Haven.

Between 1783 and 1788 Campbell visited Italy and Sicily, where he bought antiquities from Fr. John Thorpe, Henry Tresham, James Durno and Thomas Jenkins, commissioned paintings of archaeological sites in Naples and Sicily from Xavier della Gatta, Tito Lusieri, Henry Tresham and Louis Ducros, and bought sculptures from the young Canova (including Psyche Revived by Cupid's Kiss), but never received them. In 1788 Campbell bought from Giovanni Volpato the celebrated Lante Vase, now at Woburn Abbey in Bedfordshire. He also began a collection of 'Etruscan' (i.e. ancient Greek) vases from Nola and other southern Italian sites, and had further examples sent to him after his return to Britain, including the 'Campbell Krater' excavated at Lecce in 1790. He also continued to acquire architectural and sculptural fragments and casts. Campbell established a museum in his house in Oxford Street, London, which had an art-historical rather than decorative intention, and was hailed by the sculptor, John Flaxman, as 'excellent news for the arts'. In 1794 Campbell became a Fellow of the Society of Antiquaries and in 1795 a Fellow of the Royal Society.

As a Parliamentarian, Campbell was at first a Whig and a supporter of Lord North. In debates on the North Atlantic slave trade he supported the abolitionists. He became a supporter of the younger Pitt's war policy. As a landowner he was an active improver - draining the Castlemartin Corse and creating Bosherton lakes. His generosity to the poor was proverbial. He gave up his seat in the House of Commons for one in the House of Lords when created Baron Cawdor of Castlemartin in the County of Pembroke on 21 June 1796.

In 1797 he was the commander of the Pembrokeshire Yeomanry, who defeated Napoleon's troops in the Last invasion of Britain. The following year he was appointed Colonel of the Carmarthenshire Militia.

In 1800 Cawdor sold the contents of his Museum. Several items were sold to the architect, Sir John Soane. In 1804 he added to his extensive land-holdings by inheriting John Vaughan's estates at Golden Grove, Carmarthenshire. In 1808 he was Mayor of Carmarthen.

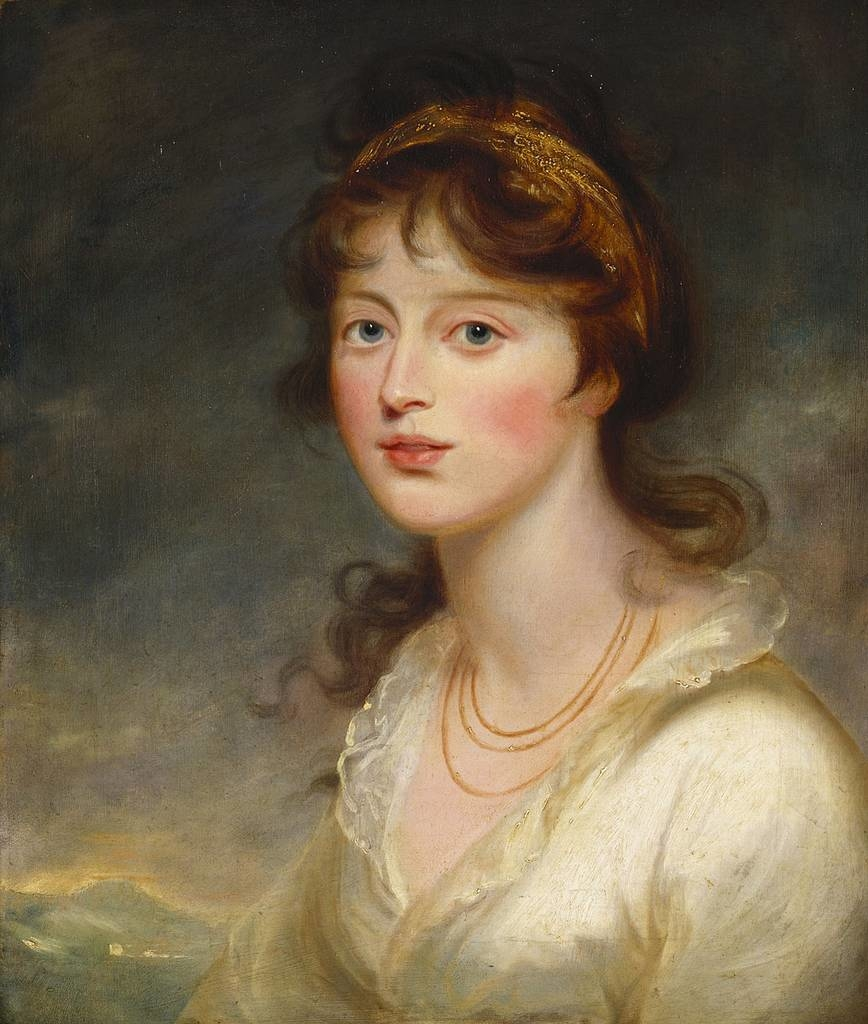
Isabella Caroline, Countess of Cawdor (1771-1848) by Sir William Beechey

Lord Cawdor died on 1 June 1821, at Bath and was buried at Bath Abbey. On 28 July 1789 he had married Lady Isabella Caroline Howard, eldest daughter of Frederick Howard, 5th Earl of Carlisle and Lady Margaret Caroline Leveson-Gower. They had two children:

- John Frederick Campbell, 1st Earl Cawdor (1790–1860), married Elizabeth Thynne, daughter of the 2nd Marquis of Bath
- Rear-Admiral Hon. George Pryse Campbell (1793–12 August 1858), married on 13 October 1821 Charlotte Gascoyne, daughter of Isaac Gascoyne.

A portrait of John Campbell was made by Joshua Reynolds (1778; now in Cawdor Castle, Nairn); a miniature of him by Richard Cosway is in the National Galleries of Scotland.

Parliament of Great Britain
Preceded by Cosmo Gordon	Member of Parliament for Nairnshire; 1777–1780	Succeeded by Alexander Campbell
Preceded by Thomas Johnes	Member of Parliament for Cardigan Boroughs; 1780–1796	Succeeded by Hon. John Vaughan
Peerage of Great Britain
New creation	Baron Cawdor; 1796–1821	Succeeded by John Frederick Campbell
