= Thane (Scotland) =

Title for nobility

Thane (/ˈθeɪn/; Scottish Gaelic: taidhn) was the title given to a local royal official in medieval eastern Scotland, equivalent in rank to the son of an earl, who was at the head of an administrative and socio-economic unit known as a thanedom or thanage.

== History ==
[T]he "thane", though he later developed into a laird, was at first an officer, half royal servant and half landowner, who looked after a portion of the king's land.

— John Duncan Mackie,

The earliest documentary record of a thane is in the written judgement of a land dispute settled at a provincial assembly of Fife between 1128 and 1136, at which one attendee is described as the thane of Falkland. A further eleven thanes are recorded over the course of the rest of the 12th century, attached to estates from East Lothian to Moray, all of which were at the time under the control of the King of Alba. From around the beginning of the 13th century a few thanes also start to be documented attached to estates under the control of earls, including Dunning and Strowan, which both lay within the Earldom of Strathearn. A statute of 1221 explicitly allowed that some thanes could be responsible to an earl rather than the king, though the overwhelming majority of thanes in the historical record were attached to lands that lay outside earldoms and were in royal hands.

The thane was introduced in the reign of David I (reigned 1124–1153), an Anglophile, to replace the Gaelic tòiseach (meaning leader, and with which the term Taoiseach shares an origin). In Scotland at that time toshach designated a deputy to a mormaer, controlling a particular portion of a mormaerdom on the mormaer's behalf. The English thegn was a more general term, simply referring to landholders of widely varying importance. Having introduced earl to describe mormaers, David used thane to describe toshachs.

Functionally, the thane was a territorial administrator, acting under a territorial earl (the latter resembling a Saxon ealdorman rather than the more superficial Norman earl), or royal steward. 12th century evidence makes it clear that the thane's key role was to collect revenue and services from the estates they administered, being permitted to keep some for themselves as "thane's right" (Latin: ius thani). Though thanes often held land within the region they administered, this was coincidental; providing land tenure was simply the way of paying for their services, the location of their lands not being intrinsically linked to the authority they wielded in any particular region.

However, after the death of Alexander III in 1286, thanes differed from their tosach forebears by holding their position as a feudal grant from the crown, rather than the almost independent status held by a tosach. Thanes consequently resembled English barons, but with greater judicial and administrative authority which extended beyond the lands they directly held. In later centuries, the term thanes dropped out of use in favour of baron, but described as having regality, a term used to describe both the thanes' powers, and the greater powers of the territorial earl.

== List of thanages ==
Aberdeen

- Formartine
- Belhelvie
- Kintore
- Aberdeen
- Kincardine O'Neil
- Aboyne

Angus

- Kinnaber
- Menmuir
- Clova
- Kinalty
- Tannadice
- Aberlermo
- Old Montrose
- Inverkeilor
- Idvies
- Forfar
- Glamis
- Downie
- Monifieth

Banff

- Boyne
- Mumbrie
- Netherdale
- Aberchirder
- Conveth
- Glendowachy

East Lothian

- Haddington

Fife

- Falkland
- Kingskettle
- Dairsie
- Kellie

Inverness

- Calder
- Kinmylies
- Essich

Kincardine

- Dingwall
- Durris
- Cowie
- Uras
- Arbuthnott
- Kincardine
- Fettercairn
- Newdosk
- Aberluthnott
- Laurencekirk
- Morphie

Kinross

- Kinross

Moray

- Brodie
- Dyke
- Cromdale
- Kilmalemnock
- Rathnech
- Fochabers
- Molen

Nairn

- Cawdor
- Moynes

Perth

- Alyth
- Strathardle
- Coupar Angus
- Longforgan
- Scone
- Kinclaven
- Glentilt
- Dull
- Fortingall
- Crannach
- Findowie
- Dalmarnock
- Strowan
- Auchterarder
- Dunning
- Forteviot

Ross & Cromarty

- Dingwall

Stirling

- Callendar

== Cultural associations ==
In William Shakespeare's Macbeth (1606), the character Macbeth holds the title "Thane of Glamis", and later, "Thane of Cawdor". The historical King Macbeth fought a Thane of Cawdor who died in battle, but he did not thereby acquire the title himself. The character Macduff is Thane of Fife.

The 2nd Earl of Cawdor wrote a history of the Thanes of Cawdor, in 1742, published in 1859.

== See also ==
- Abthain
- Thane of Calder
- Thane of Cawdor
- Thane of Fife
- Thane of Lochaber
- Thegn

== Bibliography ==
- Grant, Alexander (1993). "Thanes and Thanages, from the Eleventh to the Fourteenth Centuries". In Grant, Alexander; Stringer, Keith J. (eds.). Medieval Scotland: Crown, Lordship and Community. Essays Presented to G. W. S. Barrow. Edinburgh: Edinburgh University Press. pp. 39–81. ISBN 0748604189.
- Taylor, Alice (2016). The Shape of the State in Medieval Scotland, 1124–1290. Oxford: Oxford University Press. ISBN 9780198749202.
