= Jean Campbell (model) =

British fashion model

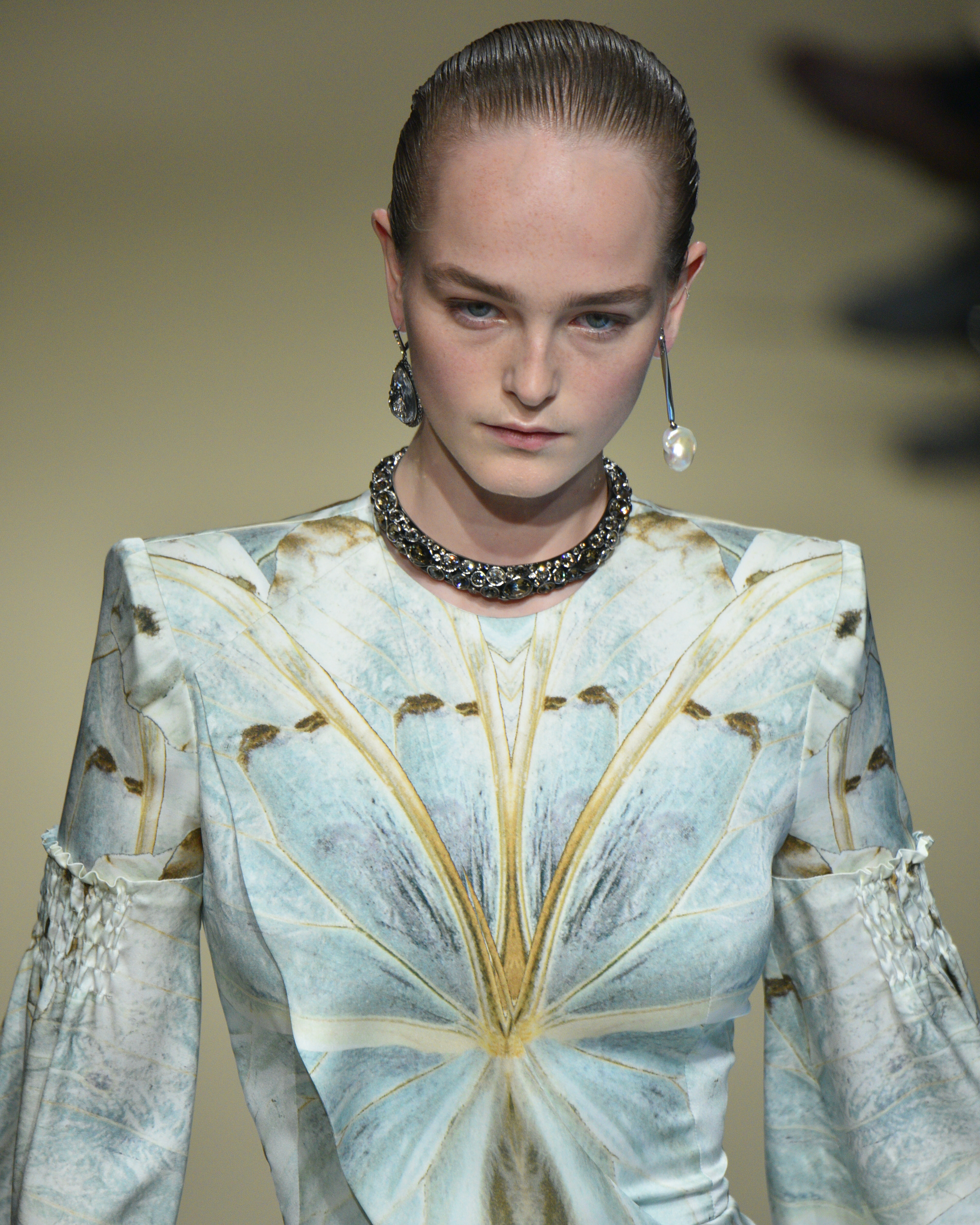
- Campbell in 2018
- Born: Jean Violet Campbell; 31 May 1997 (age 29); Westminster, London, England
- Occupation: Fashion model
- Years active: 2013–present
- Parent(s): Colin Campbell, 7th Earl Cawdor; Lady Isabella Stanhope
- Modelling information
- Height: 5.9”
- Hair colour: Blond
- Eye colour: Blue
- Agency: DNA Models (New York City); Perspective Management (London)

Lady Jean Violet Campbell (born 31 May 1997), known professionally as Jean Campbell, is a British fashion model. Throughout her career, she has modeled in campaigns for designers including Stuart Weitzman, Louis Vuitton, Narciso Rodriguez, Alexander McQueen, Tory Burch, and Ralph Lauren. Campbell is ranked as a "Top 50" model and “Icon” by models.com

== Early life ==
Campbell was born in Westminster, London and spent her early childhood in Nairn before moving back to London at age 8. She is the daughter of Colin Campbell, 7th Earl Cawdor, an architect and former member of the House of Lords, and Lady Isabella Stanhope, a former British Vogue editor and daughter of William Stanhope, 11th Earl of Harrington. She has three younger siblings.

== Career ==
Campbell was first scouted to be a model at the Clothes Show Live in Birmingham when she was 12. She initially declined, but changed her mind when she was 14. She landed her first job with British Vogue after sitting her GCSEs. Her second job was a Burberry campaign.

Campbell appeared in a Stuart Weitzman advertisement with Kendall Jenner, Willow Smith, and Yang Mi. She has appeared in Louis Vuitton advertisements and runway shows. Campbell has been the face of "for her" by Narciso Rodriguez. She has also appeared in advertisements for Alexander McQueen, Bottega Veneta, Tory Burch, Carolina Herrera, G-Star Raw, David Yurman, Ralph Lauren, and Zara.

Campbell ranked as an “Icon,” in the "Top 50" models by models.com, and ranked on their "Money Girls" list.

In 2024, Campbell started a podcast titled I'm Fine inspired by her experiences with chronic pain, in which she interviews guests on their experiences with various physical and mental health conditions, particularly those that are invisible. She hosted a live panel with Australian model Abbey Lee.

== Personal life ==
Campbell is based in East London and in a relationship with the visual artist Orfeo Tagiuri.

Campbell was in a ski accident when she was 12. She subsequently developed chronic pain from hip dysplasia. In March 2023, she revealed that shortly after undergoing one of her multiple hip surgeries, she was told she was "too big" to model for a major fashion brand.
