= Clan Campbell =

Highland Scottish clan

- Na Caimbeulaich, Síol Diarmaid, Mac Dhiarmaid, Uí Dhuibhne
- Crest: A boar's head fessways erased Or, armed Argent, langued Gules
- Motto: Ne Obliviscaris ("Forget Not")
- Slogan: Cruachan!

Profile
- Region: Highlands
- District: Argyll
- Plant badge: Bog Myrtle
- Pipe music: "The Campbells Are Coming" (also known in Scottish Gaelic as "Baile Inneraora")

Chief
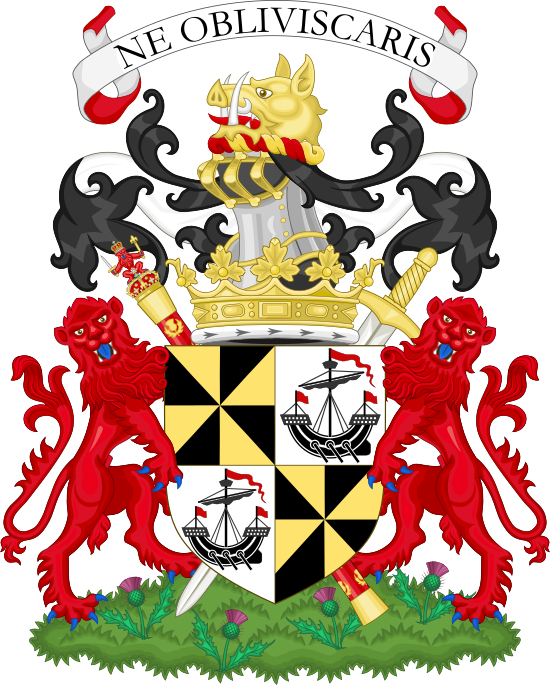
- Torquhil Ian Campbell
- The 13th Duke of Argyll (Mac Cailein Mór) ('MacCailein Mor')
- Seat: Inveraray Castle
- Historic seat: Castle Campbell
Septs of Clan Campbell
Arthur, MacArtair, MacArthur, MacCarter. Bannatyne, Ballantyne, Blanton. Brunton, Burnes, Burness, Burnett, Burns. Caddell, Cadell, Calder, Calvert, Camp Connochie, Conochie, MacConachie, MacConchie, MacConnechy, MacConochie. Denoon, Denune. Gant, Gibbon, MacGibbon, MacGubbin. Harres, Harris, Hardy, Hawes, Haws, Hawson. Hastings. Isaac, Isaacs, Kemp, Kissack, Kissock, MacIsaac, MacKessack, MacKessock, MacKissock. Iverson, Macever, Macgure, MacIver, MacIvor, Macure, Orr, Ure. Kellar, Keller, Maceller, MacKellar (also McKellar), McKerrow. Lorne. McGilekeyr (also Gilkie, Gilkey), Louden, Loudon, Loudoun, Lowden, Lowdon. MacColm, MacColmbe, MacLaws, MacLehose, MacTause, MacThomas, Riddell, MacDermid, MacDermott, MacDiarmid. MacElvie, MacKelvie. MacGlasrich. MacKerlie. MacNichol. MacNocaird. MacOran. Macowen. MacPhedran, MacPhederain, Paterson. MacPhun. Moore, Muir. Ochiltree. Pinkerton. Tanner, Tonner, Torrie, Torry.
Clan branches
Campbell of Argyll (chiefs)
Campbell of Strachur (senior cadets)
Campbell of Breadalbane
Campbell of Cawdor
Campbell of Loudoun
Carter-Campbell of Possil
Campbell of Craignish
Campbell of Auchinbreck
See also:
Campbell baronets
Allied clans
Clan Bruce
Clan Grant
Clan Drummond
Clan Leslie
Clan Maitland
Clan Malcolm
Clan Scott
Clan Forbes
Clan Stewart of Balquhidder
Clan Menzies
Clan MacInnes
Clan MacEwen
Clan MacCallum
Clan MacLeod
Clan MacLachlan
Clan Buchanan
Clan MacFarlane
Clan Wallace
Rival clans
Clan MacDonald
Clan MacDougall
Clan MacArthur
Clan Gordon
Clan Lamont
Clan MacGregor
Clan MacLaren
Clan MacLean
Clan MacKinnon
Clan MacAlister
Clan MacLea
Clan Sinclair
Clan Calder
Clan MacNaghten

"The Campbells Are Coming"
For pipes and drums

Clan Campbell (Scottish Gaelic: Na Caimbeulaich [na ˈkʰaimbəl̪ˠɪç]) is a Highland Scottish clan, historically one of the largest and most powerful of the Highland clans. The Clan Campbell lands are in Argyll and within their lands lies Ben Cruachan. The chief of the clan became Earl of Argyll and later Duke of Argyll.

== History ==
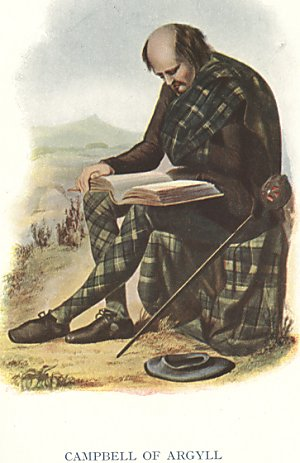
19th-century depiction of a Campbell of Argyll by R.R. McIan

=== Origins ===
In traditional genealogies of Clan Campbell, the clan's origins are in the ancient Britons of Strathclyde. The earliest Campbell in written record is Gillespie, whose name is recorded in 1263. Early grants to Gillespie and his relations were almost all in east-central Scotland. The family's connection with Argyll came some generations earlier when a Campbell married the heiress of the O'Duines and she brought with her the Lordship of Loch Awe. Because of this, the early clan name was Clan O'Duine. The name was later styled Clann Diarmaid based on a fancied connection to Diarmuid the Boar, a great hero from early Celtic mythology.

The original seat of Clan Campbell was either Innes Chonnel Castle on Loch Awe or Caisteal na Nigheann Ruaidh on Loch Avich. The clan's power soon spread throughout Argyll, though at first the Campbells were under the domination of the Lords of Lorne, chiefs of Clan MacDougall. The MacDougalls killed the Campbell chief Cailean Mór (Colin Campbell) in 1296. (See: Battle of Red Ford.) All subsequent chiefs of Clan Campbell have taken MacCailean Mór as their Gaelic patronymic.

Between 1200 and 1500, the Campbells emerged as one of the most powerful families in Scotland, dominant in Argyll and capable of wielding a wider influence and authority from Edinburgh to the Hebrides and western Highlands.

=== Wars of Scottish Independence ===
Early in the 14th century, the family of Colin Campbell became firm supporters of King Robert the Bruce and benefited from his successes through grants of lands, titles, and good marriages. In 1314, the Campbells fought for Scotland against England in the Wars of Scottish Independence at the Battle of Bannockburn. Throughout the 14th century, Clan Campbell rapidly expanded its lands and power. The expansion is explained in part by the loyalty of Sir Neil Campbell (Niall mac Caile) (died 1316) to the cause of Robert the Bruce, a loyalty that was rewarded with marriage to Bruce's sister Mary. The family was closely associated with the Stewarts and the Bruces in the time of Cailean Mór. Sir Neil, as a staunch ally of Robert the Bruce, was rewarded with extensive lands that had been taken from Clan MacDougall, the Lords of Lorne, and other enemies of the Bruces in Argyll.

=== 15th century and royal relations ===
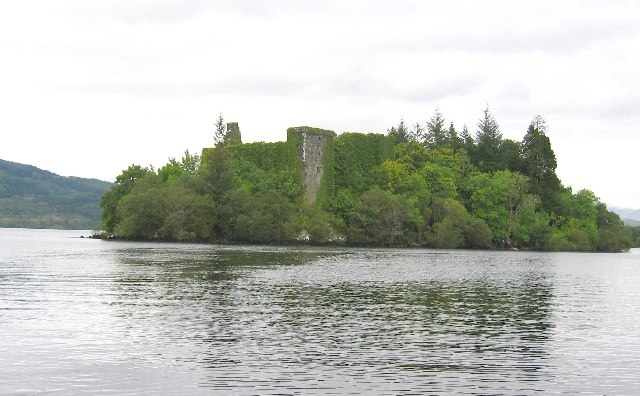
Innes Chonnel Castle on Loch Awe, possibly the earliest seat of Clan Campbell

The Campbells gave support to the Crown throughout the 15th century. By the end of the 15th century, the power of the Lords of the Isles (chiefs of Clan Donald), the Crown's most powerful rivals, had been broken, and the Campbells were the main power in the area. From this time onward, the Campbells acted as the central authority in the area; this transition of power might be the real cause of the ancient enmity between the Campbells and the MacDonalds.

Descendants of Sir Duncan Campbell, 1st Lord Campbell (Donnchadh), and his wife Lady Marjorie Stewart are descendants of Robert the Bruce, King of Scotland, and Robert II Stewart, King of Scotland. Lady Marjorie Stewart (born circa 1390) was the daughter of King Robert II's son, Robert Stewart, 1st Duke of Albany. This makes all descendants of Sir Duncan Campbell and Lady Marjorie Stewart descendants of Robert I Bruce and of most of the early kings of Scotland.

The title of 1st Lord Campbell was created in 1445. In the second half of the 15th century, the Campbells played an increasingly prominent role in Scotland. During his reign, James I of Scotland launched a great political assault on the Albany Stewarts and their allies in the west. However, Duncan Campbell, 1st Lord Campbell (Donnchadh), escaped the fate of his Albany kinsmen, who all were either executed or exiled.

Colin Campbell, 1st Earl of Argyll (Cailean), was ennobled as Earl of Argyll in 1457 and later became Baron of Lorn. He also was granted lands in Knapdale. The title and land grants were signs that the Argylls were one of the major forces in Scotland. In 1493, after the forfeiture of the MacDonalds as Lords of the Isles, the Campbell lords might well have viewed themselves as natural successors to Clan Donald in terms of leadership of the Gaels of the Hebrides and western Highlands. The Campbell lordship thus remained one of the most significant bastions of Gaelic learning and culture in late medieval and early modern Scotland.

In the Battle of Knockmary in 1490, men of Clan Campbell and Clan Drummond joined forces to defeat Clan Murray. The battle also became known as the Massacre of Monzievaird. In 1499, Campbell of Inverliver defeated Clan Calder at the Battle of Daltullich. Sir John Campbell, the younger son of the Earl of Argyll, subsequently received the estate of Calder and Cawdor Castle through his marriage to the estate's heiress, Muriel Calder.

=== 16th century and clan conflicts ===
In 1513, the 2nd Earl of Argyll was killed along with many of his clan at the Battle of Flodden.

The Battle of Langside took place in 1568 where the chief of Clan Campbell, Archibald Campbell, 5th Earl of Argyll, commanded the forces who fought for Mary, Queen of Scots.

In 1567, a conflict took place between the Clan Campbell and Clan Arthur. Duncan MacArthur and his son of the Loch Awe MacArthur family, became the victims of their own success when jealousy of their power drove neighbours to drown them in Loch Awe during a skirmish with the Clan Campbell. In the archives of Inveraray Castle a charter dated 1567 confirms that a pardon was granted to the Campbells of Inverawe for what became known as the "drowning of Clan Arthur". It is believed that the MacArthurs trying to defend themselves were driven into the loch. Centuries later in the 1970s an ancient sword was unearthed on the shore of the loch.

For two centuries from the mid-15th century the Clan Gordon and Clan Campbell controlled the north-east and west of Scotland respectively, as the magnates who straddled the divide between the Scottish Highlands and Scottish Lowlands. In 1594, Archibald Campbell, 7th Earl of Argyll was granted a Royal Commission against George Gordon, 6th Earl of Huntly but was defeated at the Battle of Glenlivet.

=== 17th century and Civil War ===
The support that the Campbells gave to the central Government brought them rewards: In 1607, Archibald Campbell, 7th Earl of Argyll was granted the former MacDonald lands of Kintyre and in 1615 Campbell of Cawdor was allowed to purchase the Isle of Islay which had previously belonged to the Macleans of Duart.

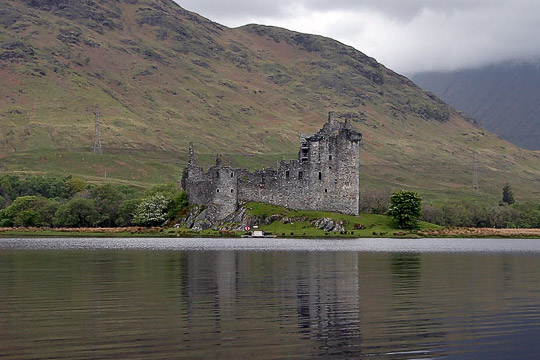
Kilchurn Castle, seat of the Campbells of Glenorchy.

At the Battle of Inverlochy (1645), the Scottish Covenanter forces led by Archibald Campbell, 1st Marquess of Argyll were defeated by the Royalist forces of James Graham, 1st Marquess of Montrose whose army was mainly made up of Scots of the Clan MacDonald, Clan Maclean, and others from Ireland. After the Battle of Inverlochy, Montrose and the Macleans burnt Castle Campbell, but the castle remained in Campbell hands. In the wake of the Battle of Inverlochy the Clan Lamont took the opportunity to raid the Campbell lands. The vengeful Campbells also ravaged the lands of the Clan Maclean who had fought against them at Inverlochy and in due course the Maclean's Duart Castle surrendered.

In 1648, at the Battle of Stirling (1648) the Kirk Party Covenanter forces of Archibald Campbell, 1st Marquess of Argyll were defeated by the Engager Covenanter forces of Sir George Munro, 1st of Newmore who supported the Earl of Lanark. Among Argyll's dead was William Campbell of Glenfalloch killed in action.

In 1672, a feud took place between the Clan Campbell and Clan Sinclair. Debt had forced George Sinclair, 6th Earl of Caithness to resign his titles and estates in favour of Sir John Campbell. Campbell took possession of the estates on Sinclair's death in May 1676, and was created earl of Caithness in June the following year. Sinclair's heir, George Sinclair of Keiss disputed the claim and seized the land in 1678. This was followed by the Battle of Altimarlech, 13 July 1680, between the Clan Campbell and the Clan Sinclair in which the Campbells were victorious. Legend has it that so many Sinclairs were killed that the Campbells were able to cross the river without getting their feet wet. Having failed to regain his inheritance by force, Sinclair of Keiss then turned to the law. He took his place as Earl of Caithness on 15 July 1681, and his lands were restored on 23 September. Campbell was made Earl of Breadalbane by way of compensation.

In 1678, Archibald Campbell, 9th Earl of Argyll led the Campbell of Argyll militia on an expedition to the Isle of Mull and took Duart Castle from the Clan Maclean. However, Argyll was beheaded on 30 June 1685 for his participation in Argyll's Rising in support of the Monmouth Rebellion to depose Catholic James VII and II and place the Protestant James, Duke of Monmouth on the throne. Later in 1692, Archibald Campbell, 1st Duke of Argyll again gained possession of the Maclean's Duart Castle.

In 1692, 38 unarmed people of the Clan MacDonald of Glencoe were killed in the Massacre of Glencoe when a Government initiative to suppress Jacobitism was entangled in the long running feud between Clan MacDonald and Clan Campbell. The slaughter of the MacDonalds at the hands of the soldiers, led by Captain Robert Campbell of Glenlyon, after enjoying their hospitality for over a week was a major affront of Scots Law and Highland tradition. The majority of soldiers were not Campbells, but a roll call from a few months before included six Campbells in addition to Cpt. Robt. Campbell: Corporal Achibald Campbell, Private Archibald Campbell (elder), Private Donald Campbell (younger), Private Archibald Campbell (younger), Private James Campbell, Private Donald Campbell (elder), and Private Duncan Campbell. See also: Earl of Argyll's Regiment of Foot.

=== 18th century and Jacobite Uprisings ===
Clan weapons on display inside Inveraray Castle

==== Jacobite rising of 1715 ====
During the Jacobite risings of the 18th century the Clan Campbell supported the British-Hanoverian Government. On 23 October 1715, chief John Campbell, 2nd Duke of Argyll learned that a detachment of rebels was passing by Castle Campbell, towards Dunfermline. He sent out a body of cavalry which attacked the rebel party and defeated it in what is now known as the Skirmish of Dunfermline and took a number of prisoners, taking only light casualties. A month later the British Government forces, including men from Clan Campbell, fought and defeated the Jacobites at the Battle of Sheriffmuir in 1715. However, there were in fact a small number of Campbells who took the side of the Jacobites led by the son of Campbell of Glenlyon whose father had commanded the Government troops at the Massacre of Glencoe against the MacDonalds 22 years earlier. These two families then settled their differences and swore to be brothers in arms, fighting side by side in the Sheriffmuir. However, the British Government forces led by chief John Campbell, 2nd Duke of Argyll defeated the Jacobites.

==== The Black Watch ====
General Wade's report on the Highlands in 1724 estimated the strength of the clan who supported the Government under the Duke of Argyll as 4,000 men, whilst those under Campbell of Breadalbane who had supported the Jacobites in 1715, as 1000 men. In 1725, six Independent Highland Companies were formed to support the Government: three from Clan Campbell, one from Clan Fraser of Lovat, one from Clan Munro and one from Clan Grant. These companies were known by the name Reicudan Dhu, or Black Watch. The Regiment of the Line was formed officially in 1739 as the 43rd Regiment of Foot and first mustered in 1740, at Aberfeldy.

==== Jacobite rising of 1745 ====
Just before 1745, the strength of the Clan Campbell had been put at a total of 5,000 men. During the Jacobite rising of 1745, the Clan Campbell continued their support for the British Government. They fought against the rebel Jacobites at the Battle of Falkirk (1746) where Government forces were defeated. However, shortly afterwards the Campbells held out during the Siege of Fort William where the Jacobites were defeated. The Campbells were also involved in the Skirmish of Keith around the same time. At the Battle of Culloden in 1746 where the Jacobites were finally defeated, involved in the fighting on the Government side were four companies from the Campbell of Argyll Militia, three companies from Loudon's Highlanders who were under the command of Lieutenant Colonel John Campbell and one company from the 43rd Highlanders who were under the command of Captain Dugald Campbell of Auchrossan.

== Castles ==
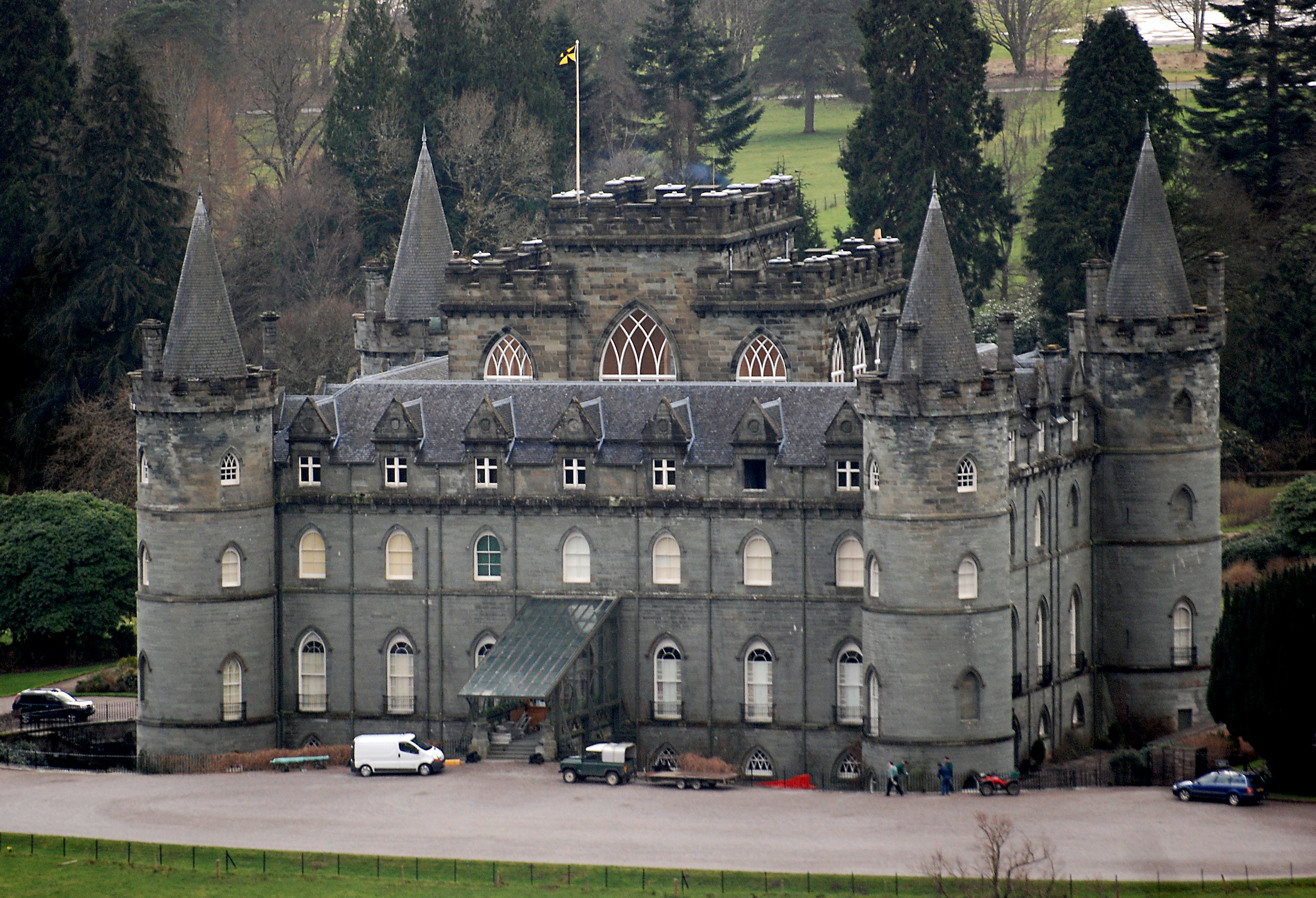
Inveraray Castle, seat of the Duke of Argyll, Chief of Clan Campbell

Castles that have belonged to the Clan Campbell have included amongst many others:

- Inveraray Castle in Argyll is the current seat of the chief of Clan Campbell. The present symmetrical mansion with towers and turrets was built in 1743 and replaced an earlier 15th-century castle. It contains a "clan room" with information for members of Clan Campbell.
- Castle Campbell, which was originally known as Castle Gloom, passed by marriage from the Clan Stewart to Colin Campbell, 1st Earl of Argyll, who renamed it Castle Campbell. During the Civil War it was burned by General Monk for Oliver Cromwell and the Clan Ogilvy are also said to have torched it in revenge for the burning of Airlie Castle.
- Innes Chonnel Castle, possibly the earliest seat of Clan Campbell.
- Kilchurn Castle was seat of the Campbells of Glenorchy. The lands were originally held by the Clan MacGregor but they went to the Campbells of Glenorchy who built or re-built the castle. The castle was strengthened and improved after being damaged by the MacGregors at the end of the sixteenth century. Duncan Campbell of Glenorchy who was known as Black Duncan of the Seven Castles was responsible for building castles at Kilchurn, Achallader, Loch Dochart, Finlarig, Balloch (Taymouth) and Edinample. In 1654, the Campbells withstood a two-day siege in Kilchurn Castle by General Middleton who retreated from Cromwell's forces.
- Achallader Castle, was seat of Sir Duncan Campbell of Glen Orchy which he acquired in 1590.
- Finlarig Castle, was another seat of the Campbell of Breadalbane branch of the clan.
- Edinample Castle, was another seat of the Campbell of Glenorchy branch of the clan.
- Taymouth Castle, originally built by Sir Colin Campbell of Glenorchy in around 1580 and known as Balloch Castle, the current building was built between 1801 and 1842 and incorporates the cellars of the original stronghold.
- Saddell Castle was owned by the Campbells from the late 17th century onwards.
- Torosay Castle, built by John Campbell of Possil in 1858.
- Castle Sween was granted to Colin Campbell in 1481 when he became the first Earl of Argyll, but it was captured by the MacDonalds in 1647.
- Carnasserie Castle, has belonged to the Clan Campbell since the 16th century.
- Kilmartin Castle, passed to the Campbells in 1674.
- Ardkinglas Castle.
- Auchenbreck Castle, held by the Campbell of Auchinbreck branch of the clan but demolished by 1870.
- Cawdor Castle, originally seat of the chiefs of Clan Calder, it later passed to the Clan Campbell of Cawdor.
- Loudoun Castle in Ayrshire, is a mansion dating from the early nineteenth century but includes work from a fifteenth century castle which was originally held by the Clan Crawford, but passed by marriage to the Campbells in the fourteenth century. This branch of the Clan Campbell sprung from Donald Campbell, second son of Colin Campbell of Lochaw. John Campbell, from another branch of the clan was made Earl of Loudon in 1641. In 1650, the castle was surrendered to General Monk for Cromwell after a siege in which the castle was damaged. The earl took part in Glencairn's rising in support of Charles II of England in 1653. John Campbell, 4th Earl of Loudoun fought for the British-Hanoverians during the Jacobite risings.
- Lesmoir Castle
- Castle and Lands of Auchruglen - East Ayrshire.

== Tartans ==
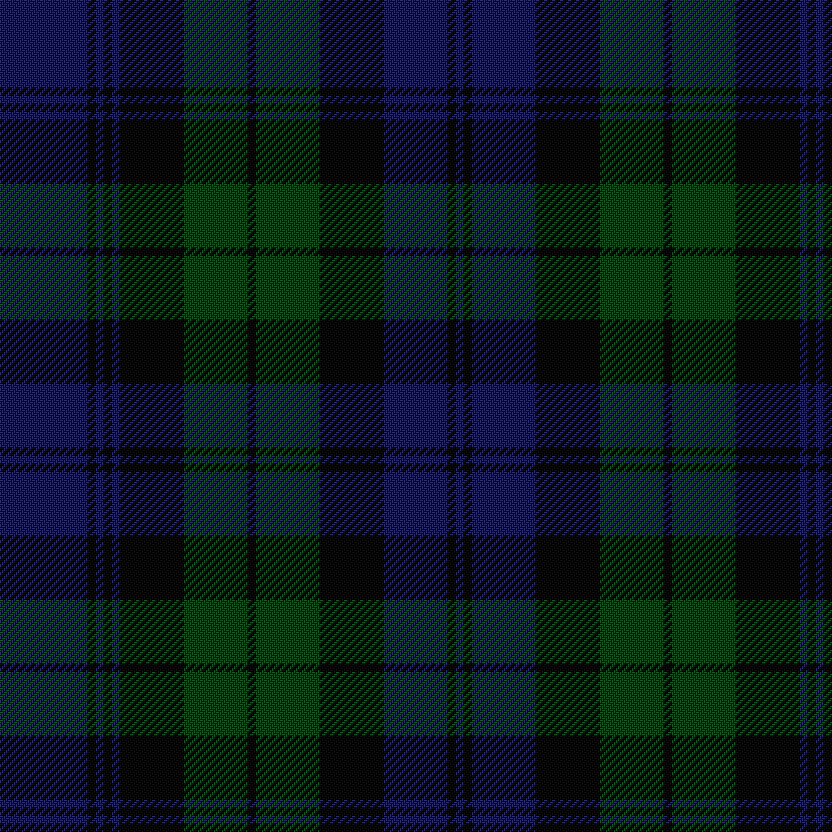
The Campbell Modern tartan, also known as Black Watch or the Government sett. The tartan is still in current use by several military units throughout the Commonwealth.

Although mills produce many fabrics based on the Campbell tartan, the clan chief recognizes only four:

- Campbell or old Campbell: In darker tones, it is more commonly known as the Black Watch tartan or the Government sett. The Black Watch, first raised in 1695 to police the "black trade" of cattle smuggling in the Highlands, taking role later as a militia in 1725 by General Wade (after the act of Union in 1707), became what was the first Highland regiment in the British Army. All Campbell tartans are based upon the Old Campbell tartan, as are many other clan tartans. The Black Watch variant was used, and is in current use, by several military units throughout the Commonwealth.
- Campbell of Breadalbane: the tartan of the Campbells of the Breadalbane and Glenorchy branches.
- Campbell of Cawdor: the tartan of the Campbells of the Cawdor branch.
- Campbell of Loudoun: the tartan of the Campbells of the Loudoun branch.

George Campbell, 6th Duke of Argyll added a white line to his tartan to distinguish himself as the clan chief. He was the only member of the family to do so, but the tartan has persisted as "Campbell of Argyll" which, as with any other tartan not listed above, is not recognized as official by the clan.

== Chief ==
- Torquhil Ian Campbell is the 13th Duke of Argyll, Marquess of Kintyre and Lorne, Earl of Argyll, Campbell and Cowal, Viscount Lochawe and Glenyla, Lord Campbell, Lorne, Kintyre, Inveraray, Mull, Morven and Tyrie in the peerage of Scotland, Baron Sundridge of Coombank and Baron Hamilton of Hameldon in the peerage of Great Britain, 6th Duke of Argyll in the peerage of the United Kingdom, Baronet of Nova Scotia, Hereditary Master of the Royal Household in Scotland, Hereditary Keeper of the Great Seal of Scotland, Hereditary Keeper of the royal castles of Dunoon, Carrick Castle, Dunstaffnage Castle and Tarbet, Admiral of the Western coasts and isles, and Chief of the Honorable Clan Campbell. The chief's Gaelic title is Mac Cailein Mòr ('Son of Colin the Great'). Campbell is also the hereditary High Sheriff of Argyllshire, a member of the Queen's Body Guard for Scotland, and a member of the Royal Company of Archers.

== Branches ==
Duke of Argyll	Marquess of Breadalbane	Earl of Cawdor	Earl of Loudoun
Campbell of Aberuchill	Campbell of Ardchattan	Campbell of Barcaldine	Campbell of Cawdor
Campbell of Clathick	Campbell of Lawers	Campbell of Lochaw	Campbell of Lochdochart
Campbell of Lochnell	Campbell of Monzie	Campbell of Moy	Campbell of Ottar
Campbell of Park	Campbell of Possil	Campbell of Smiddygreen	Campbell of Craignish
Campbell of Auchinbreck	Campbell of Auchawillig	Campbell of Ardentinny	Campbell of Ardkinglas
Campbell of Gargunnock	Campbell of Inverneil	Lord Stratheden	Campbell of Netherplace
Campbell of Glenlyon	Campbell of Lix	Campbell of Blythswood	Campbell of Glenfalloch

- Campbell of Aberuchill
- Campbell of Ardkinglas
- Campbell of Argyll
- Campbell of Auchinbreck
- Campbell of Barbreck (Old)
- Campbell of Barcaldine
- Campbell of Breadalbane and Holland
- Campbell of Carrick Buoy
- Campbell of Cawdor
- Campbell of Craignish
- Campbell of Dunstaffnage
- Campbell of Duntroon
- Campbell of Gartsford
- Campbell of Glen Lyon
- Campbell of Glenorchy
- Campbell of Inverawe
- Campbell of Inverneill
- Campbell of Kenmore and Melfort
- Campbell of Lochnell
- Campbell of Loudoun
- Campbell of Lundie (Old)
- Campbell of Marchmont
- Campbell of Ormidale (Old)
- Campbell of Otter (Old)
- Campbell of Possil
- Campbell of Skipness
- Campbell of Strachur
- Campbell of Succoth

== See also ==
Sledge flag used by Victor Campbell in Antarctica during the Terra Nova Expedition (1910–1913), featuring the boar's head crest of Clan Campbell

- Ane Accompt of the Genealogie of the Campbells
- Campbell of Argyll Militia
- "The Campbells Are Coming"
