= Colin Campbell, 7th Earl Cawdor =

British architect (born 1962)

The Right Honourable The Earl Cawdor DL

Vice-Lord Lieutenant of Nairnshire

Member of the House of Lords Lord Temporal
- In office 1993–1999
- Preceded by: The 6th Earl Cawdor
- Succeeded by: seat abolished

Personal details
- Born: 30 June 1962 (age 64) Carmarthen, Wales
- Spouse: Lady Isabella Stanhope (m. 1994)
- Children: Lady Jean Campbell; James Chester Campbell, Viscount Emlyn; Lady Eleanor Campbell; Lady Beatrice Campbell
- Parents: Hugh John Vaughan Campbell, 6th Earl Cawdor (father); Cathryn Hinde (mother)
- Relatives: Clan Campbell of Cawdor
- Education: Eton College; St Peter's College, Oxford
- Occupation: architect, politician, landowner

Colin Robert Vaughan Campbell, 7th Earl Cawdor, DL (born 30 June 1962), styled Viscount Emlyn from 1970 to 1993, is a Scottish peer, landowner, and architect. A member of the House of Lords from 1993 to 1999, he is Vice-Lord Lieutenant of Nairnshire.

== Life ==
Born in Carmarthen, Cawdor is the elder son of Hugh John Vaughan Campbell, 6th Earl Cawdor, and his first wife Cathryn Hinde, a daughter of Major-General Sir Robert Hinde, and was educated at Eton College and St Peter's College, Oxford. On his father's death in 1993, he succeeded him as Earl Cawdor of Castlemartin, Viscount Emlyn, of Emlyn, and Baron Cawdor of Castlemartin. He also inherited a Scottish estate of some 50,000 acres and Cawdor Castle, which is one of the locations of the Shakespeare play Macbeth.

In 2006, he launched a project called "New Future for Nairn", recalling that the town of Nairn had once been popular for seaside holidays and known as "the Brighton of the North". In 2007, came more detailed plans to develop 274 acres of land at Delnies, on the outskirts of the town, for new housing, a sports centre, and an arts centre.

== Personal life ==
On 21 October 1994, at Adare, County Limerick, Lord Cawdor married Lady Isabella Stanhope, youngest daughter of William Stanhope, 11th Earl of Harrington. She was a Vogue fashion editor who has since become an interior decorator. They have four children:

- Lady Jean Campbell (born 1997)
- James Chester Campbell, Viscount Emlyn (born 1998)
- Lady Eleanor Campbell (born 2000)
- Lady Beatrice Campbell (born 2004)

In 2001, Lord Cawdor clashed with his stepmother, Angelika Campbell, Countess Cawdor, when she tried to have him evicted from the castle, so that she could continue to occupy it. In 2005, he and his wife and children were living at Drynachan Lodge, an eight-bedroom hunting lodge by the River Findhorn.

In 2007, as "Earl Colin & Countess Isabella of Cawdor", Vogue listed the Cawdors among its best-dressed couples.

On 23 June 2013, The New York Times quoted Lord Cawdor's elder sister Lady Liza Campbell in an article which described male-preference primogeniture as a legacy form of sexism.

Peerage of the United Kingdom
Preceded by Hugh John Vaughan Campbell	Earl Cawdor; 1993–present	Incumbent
