= John Campbell, 1st Earl Cawdor =

British politician (1790–1860)

The Right Honourable The Earl Cawdor FRS DL
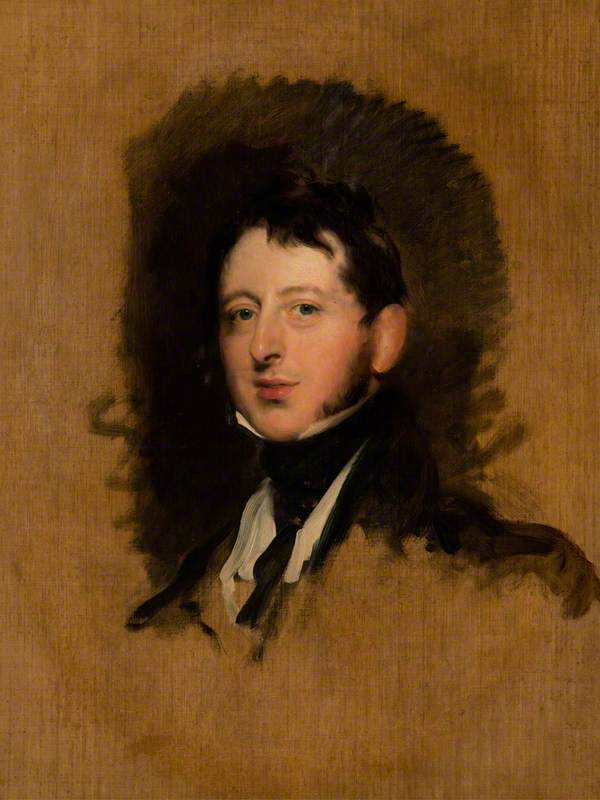
- Portrait of Lord Cawdor by Thomas Lawrence

Lord Lieutenant of Carmarthenshire
- In office 1852–1860
- Preceded by: The 3rd Lord Dynevor
- Succeeded by: The 2nd Earl Cawdor

Member of the House of Lords Lord Temporal
- In office 1821–1860
- Succeeded by: The 2nd Earl Cawdor

Member of Parliament for Carmarthen
- In office 1813–1821
- Preceded by: Sir George Campbell
- Succeeded by: John Jones of Ystrad

Personal details
- Born: 8 November 1790
- Died: 7 November 1860 (aged 69)
- Spouse: Lady Elizabeth Thynne
- Children: 7 (including John Campbell, 2nd Earl Cawdor)
- Parents: John Campbell, 1st Baron Cawdor (father); Lady Caroline Howard (mother)
- Education: Eton College; Christ Church, Oxford

John Frederick Campbell, 1st Earl Cawdor FRS (8 November 1790 – 7 November 1860) was a British peer and MP.

He was born the son of John Campbell, 1st Baron Cawdor and Lady Caroline Howard and educated at Eton and Christ Church, Oxford, graduating BA in 1812. In 1827 he became Viscount Emlyn of Emlyn and Earl Cawdor of Castlemartin in the county of Pembroke.

In June 1812, he was elected a Fellow of the Royal Society. That same year, he stood for election to the House of Commons for Pembrokeshire after the sitting member, Lord Milford, stood down in his favour. Campbell was, however, defeated by Sir John Owen of Orielton.

He was MP for Carmarthen from 1813 to 1821 and Lord Lieutenant of Carmarthenshire from 1817 to 1860. He died on the eve of his 70th birthday from a gangrenous infection from a carbuncle on his right arm at his family estate at Stackpole, Pembrokeshire.

In 1831, at the Coronation of King William and Queen Adelaide, Earl Cawdor carried and presented the queen consort's ivory rod with dove.

== Family ==
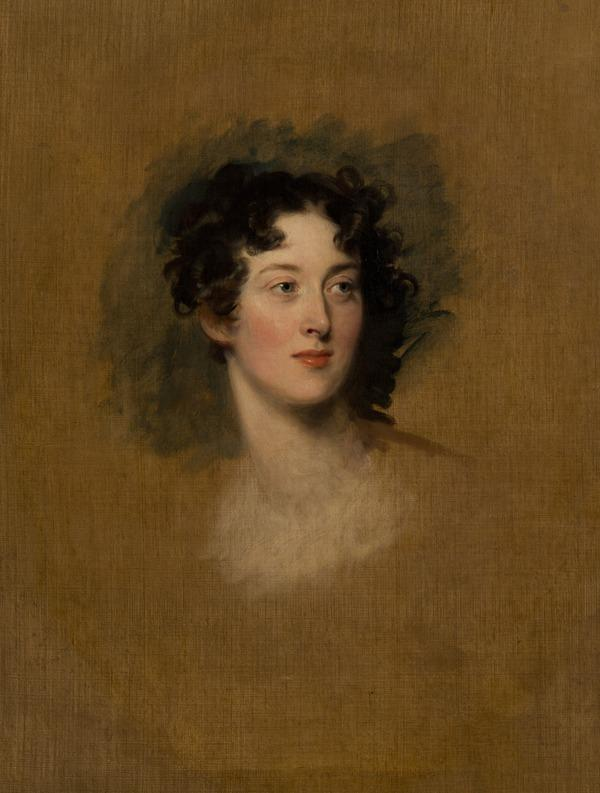
Elizabeth Campbell, Countess Cawdor by Thomas Lawrence

He married Lady Elizabeth Thynne, daughter of Thomas Thynne, 2nd Marquess of Bath and the Hon. Isabella Elizabeth Byng, on 5 September 1816. She had previously been engaged to George Sackville, 4th Duke of Dorset, who died shortly. They had seven children:

1. John Frederick Vaughan Campbell, 2nd Earl Cawdor (1817–1898).
2. Lady Emily Caroline Campbell (1819–1911), who married Octavius Duncombe. She served as a Lady-in-waiting to the Duchess of Cambridge at the 1838 coronation of Queen Victoria.
3. Lady Georgiana Isabella Campbell (1820–1884), who married John Balfour, of Balbirnie (1811–1895)
4. Lady Elizabeth Lucy Campbell (1822–1898), who married John Cuffe, 3rd Earl of Desart
5. Lady Mary Louisa Campbell (1825–1916), who married George Egerton, 2nd Earl of Ellesmere.
6. Reverend Hon. Archibald George Campbell (1827–1902).
7. Lieutenant-Colonel Hon. Henry Walter Campbell (1835–1910).

== Sources ==
- Williams, David (1960). "The Pembrokeshire Elections of 1831" (PDF). Welsh History Review. 1 (1): 37–64.

Parliament of the United Kingdom
Preceded by George Campbell	Member of Parliament for Carmarthen; 1813–1821	Succeeded by John Jones
Honorary titles
Preceded by The Lord Dynevor	Lord Lieutenant of Carmarthenshire; 1852–1860	Succeeded by The Earl Cawdor
Peerage of the United Kingdom
New creation	Earl Cawdor; 1827–1860	Succeeded by John Frederick Campbell
Peerage of Great Britain
Preceded by John Campbell	Baron Cawdor; 1821–1860	Succeeded by John Frederick Campbell
