= Clan Campbell of Cawdor =

Highland Scottish clan

Crest badge suitable to be worn by members of Clan Campbell of Cawdor.

Clan Campbell of Cawdor is a highland Scottish clan and a branch of the larger Clan Campbell. While the clan is recognised by the Standing Council of Scottish Chiefs, the clan does not have a clan chief recognised by the Standing Council of Scottish Chiefs. Also, because the clan does not have a clan chief recognised by the Lord Lyon King of Arms it is considered an armigerous clan. The head of the Clan Campbell of Cawdor is the Earl Cawdor, since 1993 Colin Campbell.

== History ==
In 1499, Muriel Calder, daughter and heiress of John Calder, 7th Thane of Calder was kidnapped by the Campbells. The battle of Daltullich was fought between her uncles and the Campbells, with several deaths, but the child was whisked away to the Campbells castle. In 1510, at 12 years old, Muriel married Sir John Campbell, third son of the 2nd Earl of Argyll. From 1524 to 1546, Sir John Campbell of Calder lived at Calder (now Cawdor) Castle, until his death. After Muriel's death in 1573, the Thanedom was resigned in favour of her grandson, John Campbell. In the 17th century, Sir John Campbell of Calder sold Croy and disposed of Ferintosh to Lord Lovat, in order to buy the Isle of Islay. Islay was held by the Campbells of Calder from 1612 to 1726 when it was bought by Daniel Campbell of Shawfield. Sir John Campbell, 8th of Calder, married Mary, eldest daughter of Lewis Pryce (or Pryse) of Gogerddan in Cardiganshire. Campbell of Calder died in 1777 and was succeeded by his son, Pryse Campbell of Calder, who was an MP for Cromartyshire and Nairnshire. His son, John, was made Lord Calder of Castlemartin in 1797. On his death in 1821, he was succeeded by his son, John Fredrick Campbell, 1st Earl of Cawdor. From the 1st Earl of Cawdor descend the Earls of Cawdor. (Source: records of the Scottish Privy Council, 1613–1616)

The name "Cawdor" is the English pronunciation and spelling of the ancient and original Highland name of CALDER. In the early 19th century, Lord John Campbell of Calder was residing in England and changed the name of the castle, town and clan overnight so that it would match the Shakespearean designation (reference: Cawdor Historical Society).

== Crest badge and tartan ==
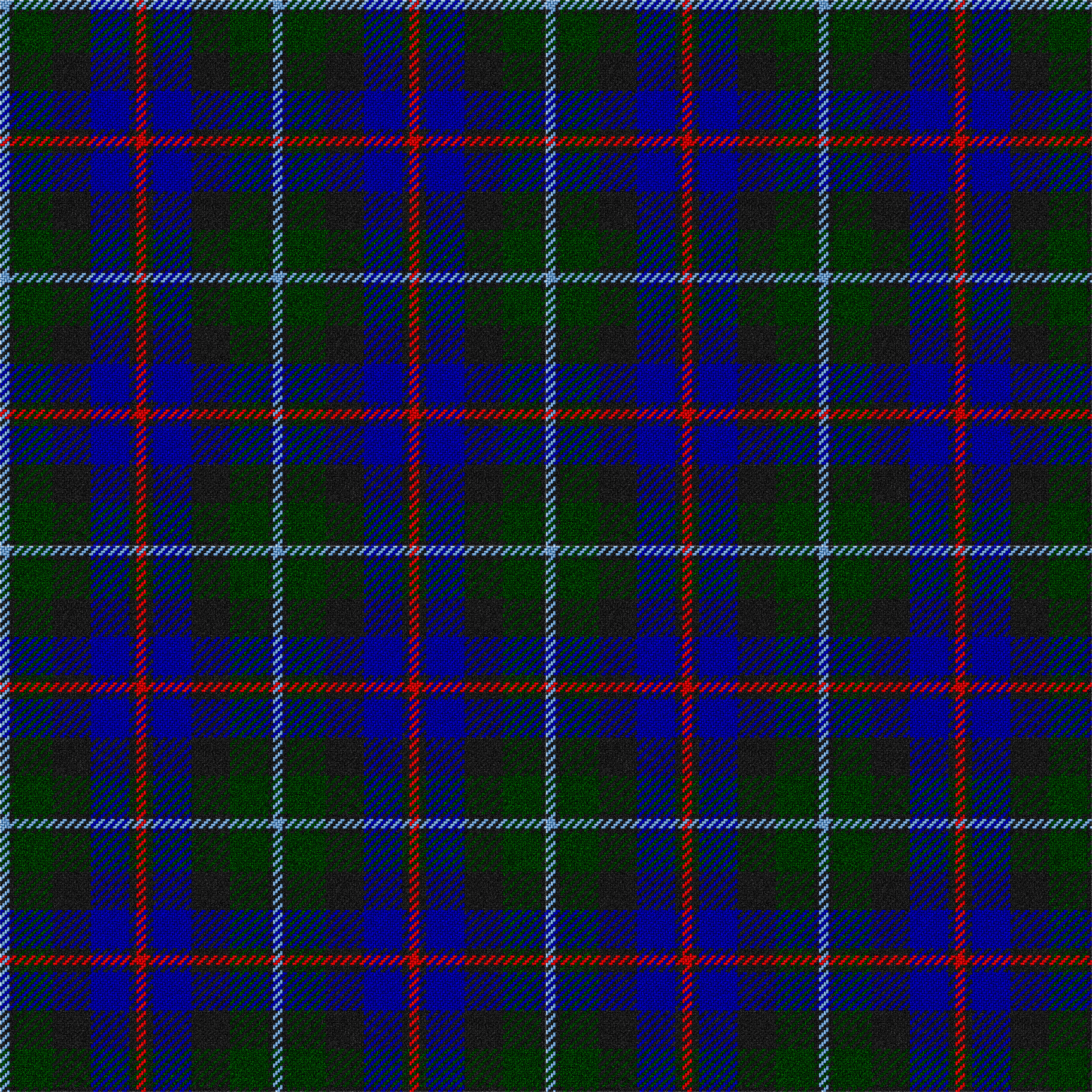
The Campbell of Cawdor tartan is one of several tartans officially authorised by the chief of Clan Campbell.

A modern clan member's crest badge contains the heraldic motto: BE MINDFUL. The Campbell of Cawdor tartan is very similar to other "Campbell" tartans. This tartan did not originally have a name, until it was called an "Argyle" tartan in 1789. It wasn't until W. and A. Smith's book was published, in 1850, that was this tartan actually named "Campbell of Cawdor". The Campbell of Cawdor tartan is one of only four tartans officially authorised by the current chief of Clan Campbell, Torquhil Campbell, 13th Duke of Argyll. Frank Adam and Thomas Innes of Learney, in their The Clans, Septs & Regiments of the Scottish Highlands, listed several septs for Clan Campbell of Cawdor. These were: Calder and Caddell. Adam and Innes of Learney also wrote that the Campbells of Cawdor were described as "de Cadella".

Names and Spellings of Names connected with Clan: Associated Names and Septs (with spelling variations): Cadall, Caddel, Caddell, Cadder, Cadell, Cadella, Caldaile, Caldell, Calder, Caldor, Cambal, Cambale, Cambel, Cambele, Cambell, Cambelle, Camble, Cammell, Campbele, Campbell, Campbill, Campble, Cattal, Cattall, Cattell, Cattle, Cauder, Caudill, Caudle, Caulder, Cawdale, Cawdor, Chambelle, Cowdale, Kambail, Kambaile, Kambayl, Kumpel, O'Docharty, Torie, Torrie, Torry

== See also ==
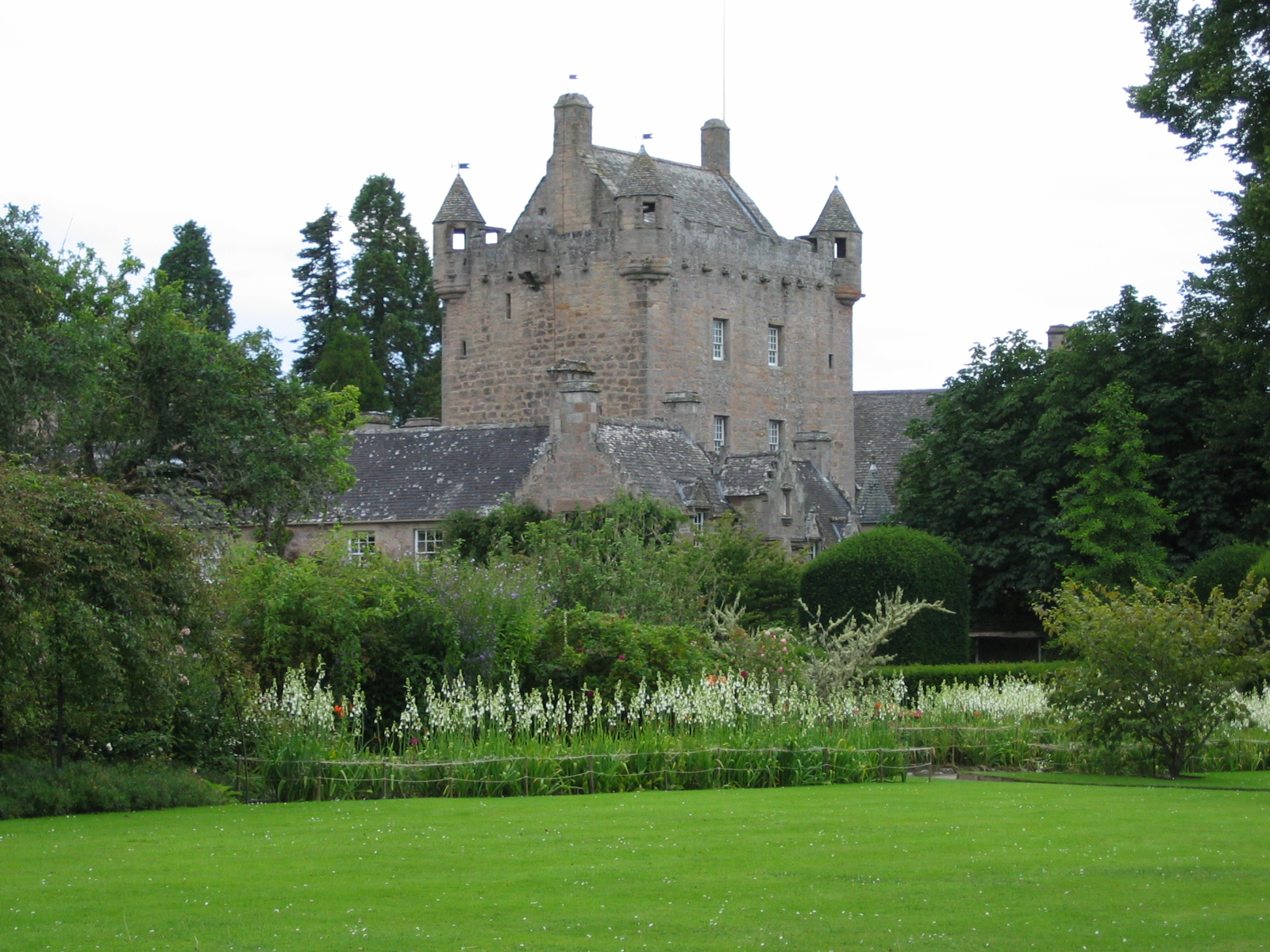
Cawdor Castle, historical seat of the chiefs of Clan Campbell of Cawdor.

- Clan Campbell
- Clan Calder
- Cawdor Castle
- Earl of Cawdor
- Armigerous clan
