= Cawdor Castle =

Castle in Nairnshire, Scotland

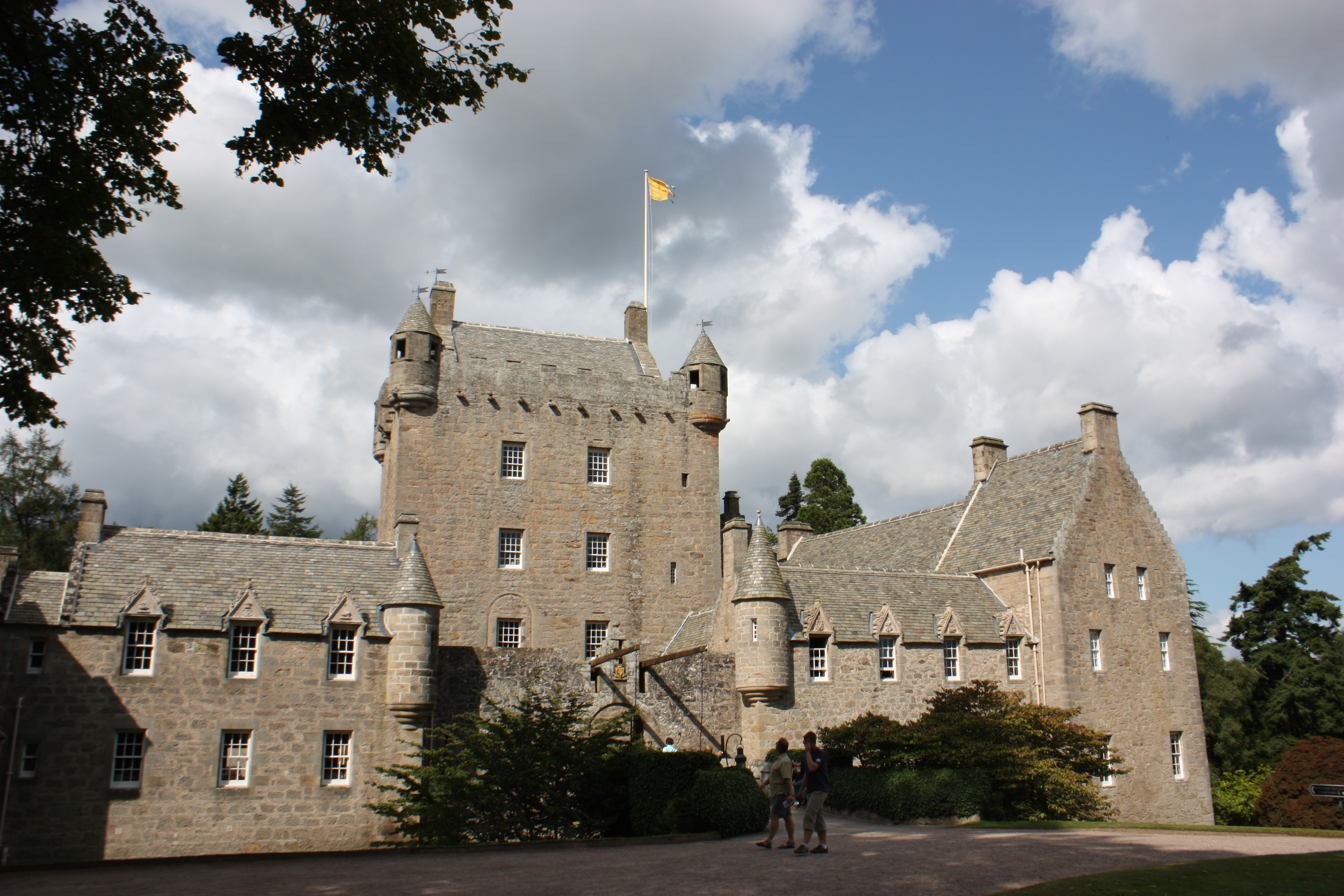
- Cawdor Castle from the east

- Location in Highland council area
- 57.5243°N 3.9264°W

Listed Building – Category A
- Designated: 26 January 1971
- Reference no.: LB1728

Inventory of Gardens and Designed Landscapes in Scotland
- Official name: Cawdor Castle
- Designated: 1 July 1987
- Reference no.: GDL00099

Cawdor Castle is a castle in the parish of Cawdor in Nairnshire, Scotland. It is built around a 15th-century tower house, with substantial additions in later centuries. Originally a property of the Calder family, it passed to the Campbells in the 16th century. It remains in Campbell ownership, and is now home to Angelika Campbell, Dowager Countess Cawdor, stepmother of Colin Campbell, 7th Earl Cawdor.

The castle is best known for its literary connection to William Shakespeare's tragedy Macbeth, in which the title character is made "Thane of Cawdor". However, the story is highly fictionalised, and the castle itself, which is never directly referred to in Macbeth, was built many years after the life of the 11th-century King Macbeth.

The castle is a category A listed building, and the grounds are included in the Inventory of Gardens and Designed Landscapes in Scotland, the national listing of significant gardens.

== History ==
The earliest documented date for the castle is 1454, the date a licence to fortify was granted to William Calder, 6th Thane of Cawdor (or Calder, as the name was then often spelled). However, some portions of the 15th-century tower house or keep may precede that date. Architectural historians have dated the style of stonework in the oldest portion of the castle to approximately 1380. One curious feature of the castle is that it was built around a small, living holly tree. Tradition states that a donkey, laden with gold, lay down to rest under this tree, which was then selected as the site of the castle. The remains of the tree may still be seen in the lowest level of the tower. Modern scientific testing has shown that the tree died in approximately 1372, lending credence to the earlier date of the castle's first construction. The iron yett (gate) here was brought from nearby Lochindorb Castle, which was dismantled by William around 1455, on the orders of King James II, after it had been forfeited by the Earl of Moray.

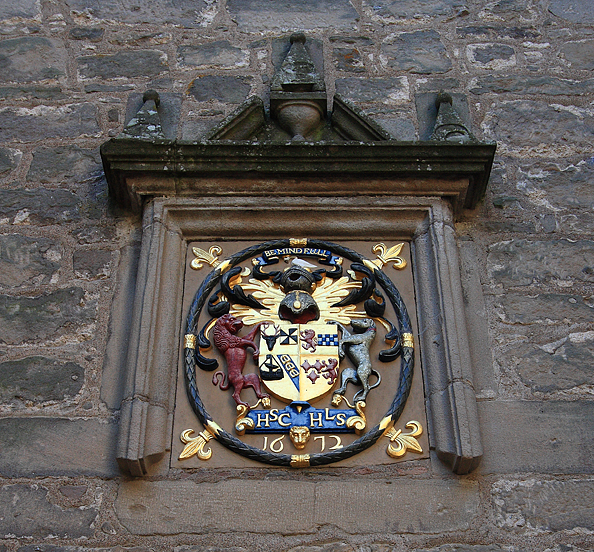
Arms of Sir Hugh Campbell and his wife Lady Henrietta Stewart, on a panel dated 1672

The castle was expanded numerous times in the succeeding centuries. In 1510 the heiress of the Calders, Muriel, married Sir John Campbell of Muckairn, who set about extending the castle. Their children included Campbell, Katherine Campbell, Countess of Crawford. Further improvements were made by John Campbell, 3rd of Cawdor (c.1576 - c.1642), who purchased rich lands on Islay. By 1635 a garden had been added, and after the Restoration Sir Hugh Campbell of Cawdor added or improved the north and west ranges, employing the masons James and Robert Nicolson of Nairn.

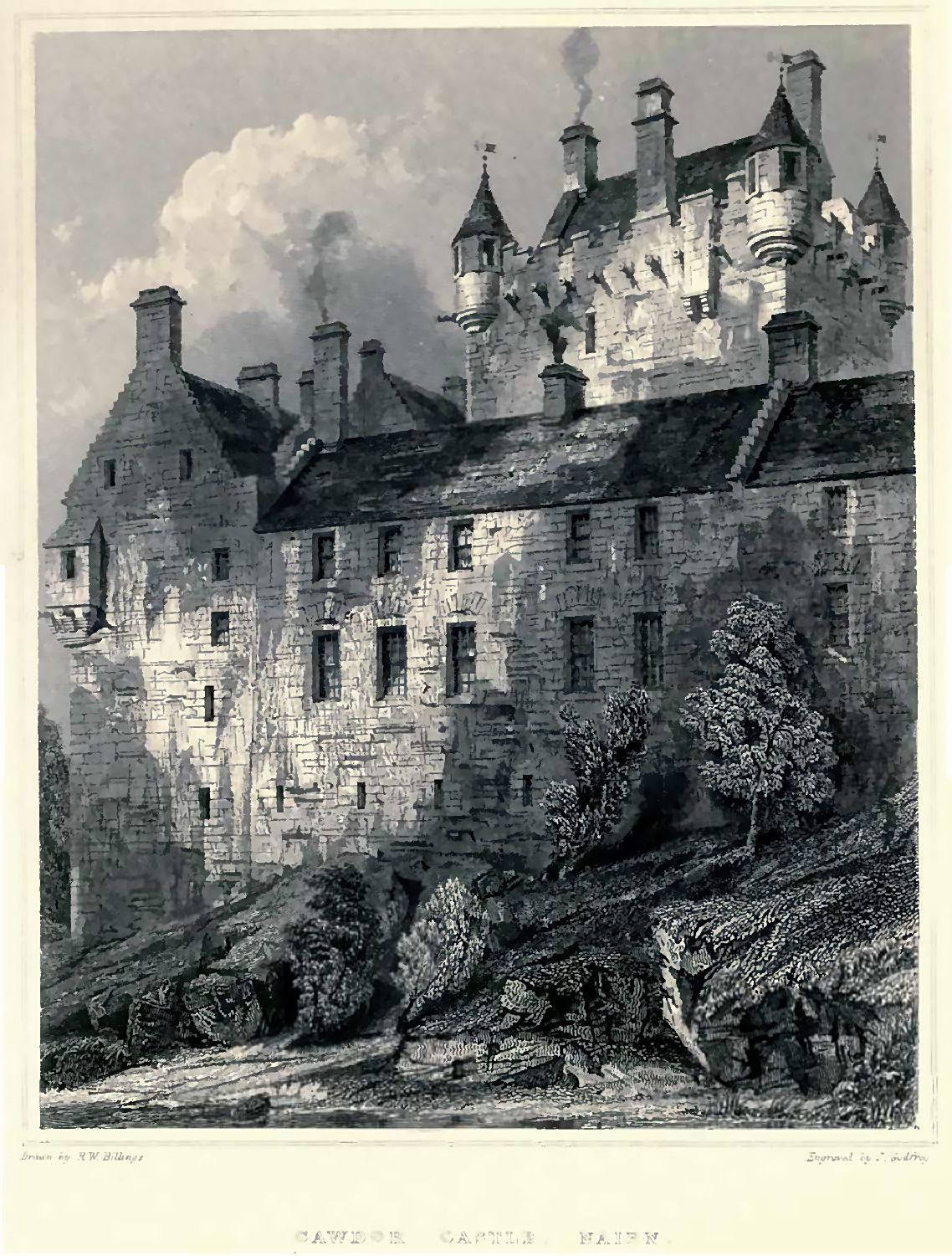
The northwest corner of the castle, from Billings' Baronial and Ecclesiastical Antiquities of Scotland (1901)

In the 1680s Sir Alexander Campbell, son of Sir Hugh, became stranded in Milford Haven during a storm, where he met a local heiress, Elizabeth Lort of Stackpole Court. The two were married and afterwards the Campbells of Cawdor lived mainly on their estates in Pembrokeshire. Cawdor was home to younger brothers of the family who continued to manage the estates, building a walled flower garden in 1720, and establishing extensive woodlands in the later 18th century.

John Campbell of Cawdor, a Member of Parliament, married a daughter of the Earl of Carlisle in 1789, and was ennobled as Lord Cawdor in 1796. In 1827, his son was created Earl Cawdor. During the 19th century, Cawdor was used as a summer residence by the Earls. The architects Thomas Mackenzie and Alexander Ross were commissioned to add the southern and eastern ranges to enclose a courtyard, accessed by a drawbridge. In the 20th century John Campbell, 5th Earl Cawdor, moved permanently to Cawdor. His second son James Campbell (1942–2019) was born here. John was succeeded by the 6th Earl, whose second wife, the Dowager Countess Angelika, born Countess Lažanský from Bohemia, lives there still. In 2001 it was reported that the Countess had prevented her stepson from sowing genetically modified rapeseed on the Cawdor estate, and in 2002 the Countess took the Earl to court after he moved into the castle while she was away.

== Gardens ==
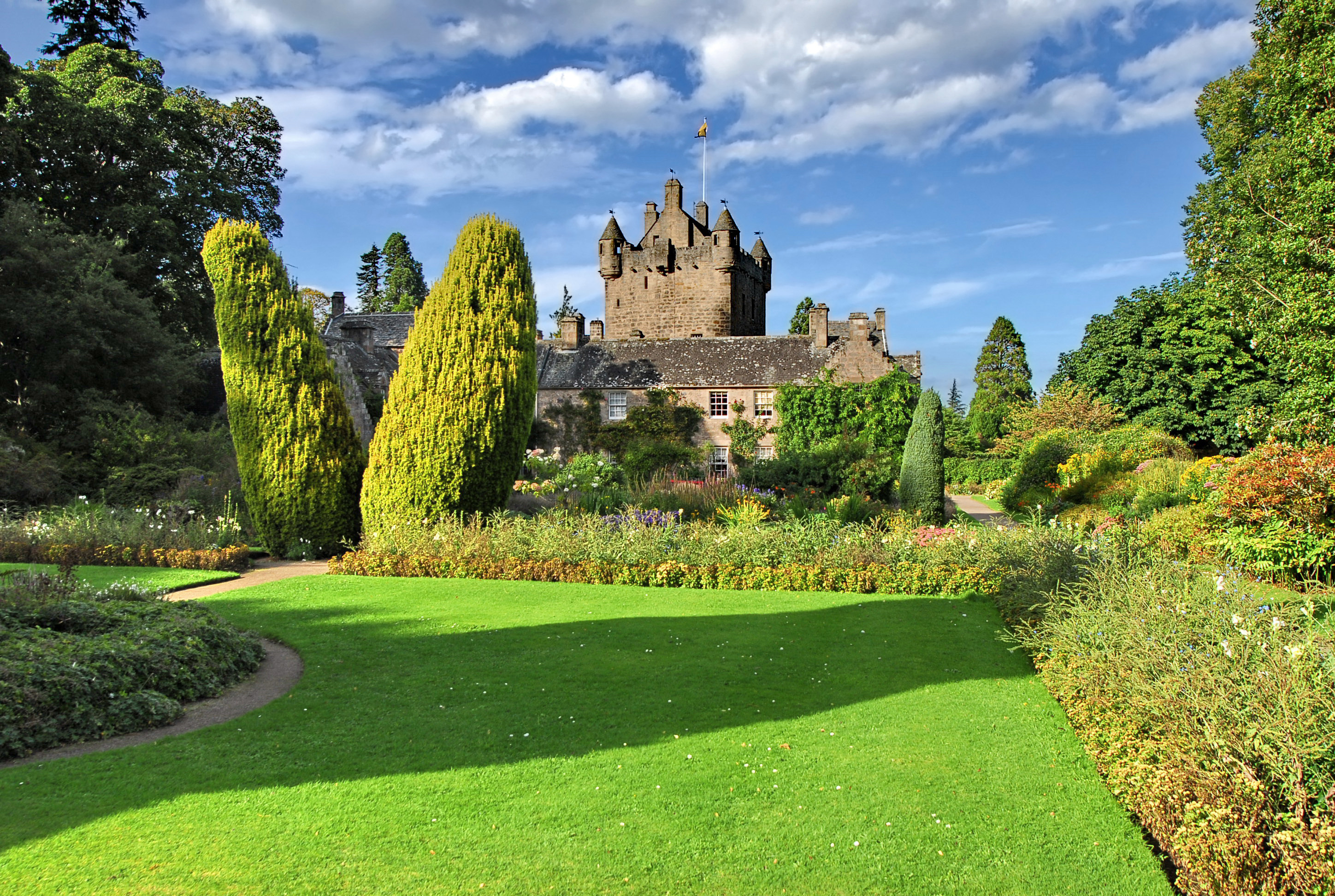
Cawdor Castle Gardens

The castle is known for its gardens, which include the Walled Garden (originally planted in the 17th century), the Flower Garden (18th century), and the Wild Garden (added in the 1960s). In addition, the castle grounds include a wood featuring numerous species of trees (as well as over 100 species of lichen).

== Shakespeare connection ==
The name of Cawdor still connects the castle to Shakespeare's play Macbeth. However, the story portrayed by Shakespeare takes extensive liberties with history. The historical King Macbeth ruled Scotland from 1040 to 1057, after his forces killed King Duncan I in battle near Elgin. Macbeth was never Thane of Cawdor, this being an invention of the 15th-century writer Hector Boece. Moreover, Cawdor Castle did not exist during the lifetimes of Macbeth or Duncan, and it is never explicitly mentioned in the play. The 5th Earl Cawdor is quoted as saying, "I wish the Bard had never written his damned play!"
