= Alexander Brodie (1697–1754) =

Scottish politician (1697–1754)

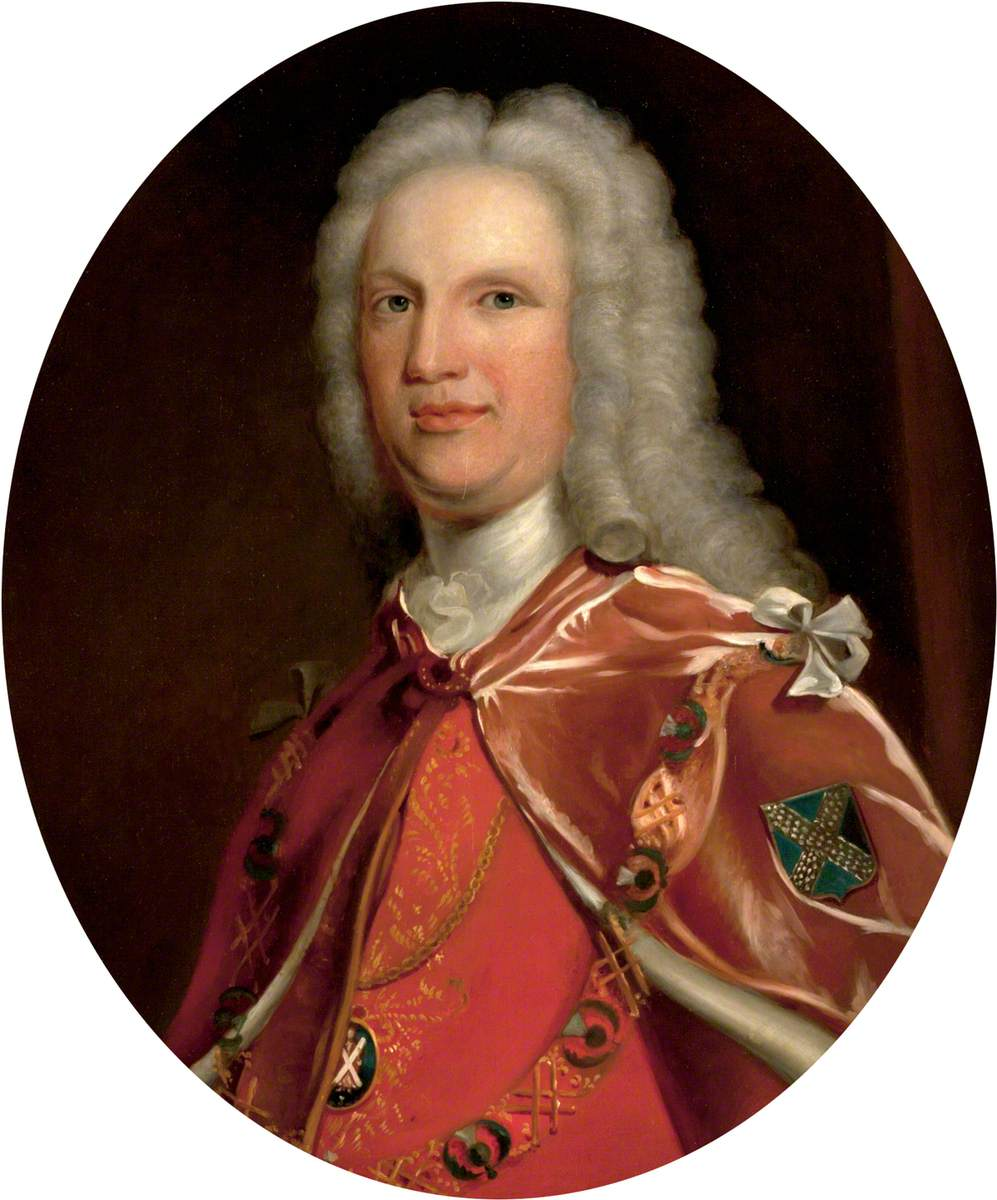
A portrait of Brodie by Allan Ramsay.

Alexander Brodie, 19th of that Ilk (17 August 1697 – 9 March 1754) was a Scottish politician and clan chief who served as the Lord Lyon King of Arms from 1727 to 1754. Born in Moray, Scotland into a Highland family, he also sat in the British House of Commons from 1720 to 1754, representing the constituencies of Elginshire, Caithness and Inverness Burghs.

In addition to serving as the clan chief of Clan Brodie, he also regulated the heraldry of Scotland as the most junior of the Scottish Great Officers of State.

== Early life ==
Brodie was the second son of George Brodie of Brodie and Aslick in Moray. His mother Emilia was the 5th daughter and co-heir of James Brodie of that Ilk. He was educated at Marischal College in Aberdeen, and possibly also at Leiden University in the Netherlands. In 1724 he married Mary Sleigh (1704–1760), daughter of Major Samuel Sleigh of the 16th Foot. They had two children: a daughter Emilia (born 1730) who married John Macleod, and a son, Alexander (1741–1759).

== Career ==
Brodie's older brother James had inherited their father's estates, and was elected in 1720 as the Member of Parliament (MP) for Elginshire. However, James died later that year aged 25, and Alexander succeeded to his estates as laird of Brodie. At the resulting by-election on 29 December 1720, Alexander was elected unopposed in James's place, in the interest of Sir James Grant.

The Grants of that Ilk had become the dominant interest in the county since the 7th Earl of Moray, the hereditary sheriff of Elginshire, had been implicated in the 1715 Jacobite rising. After the death of Alexander Grant in 1719, Sir James supported first James Brodie and then Alexander Brodie in the Elginshire seat. This arrangement continued until 1735, when Sir James passed his estates on to his son Ludovick Grant, who took the seat at the 1741 election.

Brodie was instead returned for Caithness by the county's hereditary sheriff George Sinclair of Ulbster, who was Brodie's nephew. As an alternating constituency, Caithness was not represented in the 1747–54 Parliament, and at the 1747 general election arrangements were made for Brodie to be returned for the Inverness Burghs, as part of a plan by Henry Pelham to avoid electoral contests between Scottish supporters of the government.

The heraldic achievement of the Office of the Lord Lyon King of Arms.

== Lord Lyon ==
Brodie's loyalty to the government was rewarded in July 1727, when he was appointed as Lord Lyon King of Arms, with a salary of £300 per year (equivalent to £56,000 in 2023).

His predecessor Sir Alexander Erskine of Cambo had been a Jacobite, and the Lyon's office was known to include other Jacobites, so the office was viewed with suspicion. The appointment of the staunchly Hanoverian Brodie was intended to remove those Jacobite connections, and to make the office less Scottish. Brodie was the first ever Lyon not to be crowned, and the first since the early 16th century not be knighted when appointed.

Brodie fulfilled the office with diligence. He was reputed to have enforced the laws of arms without fear or favour, and removed bogus arms even from senior peers.

Brodie attached himself to Lord Ilay, Walpole's manager of elections in Scotland, and was accused of "airs of being my Lord Ilay’s minister in the north". In 1733 he fell out with Lord Lovat, and at the 1734 election this spread to a series of intrigues which escalated into a serious disturbance at a by-election in 1735 in Nairnshire, where he put up a candidate unsuccessfully at a by-election in which both sides used force.

After the 1745 Jacobite rising, Brodie became an informer. He told the Duke of Newcastle that the Earl of Sutherland had sheltered a rebel, and is reported to have helped gather evidence against Lord Lovat. In 1746, he supported the Highland Dress Bill, insisting that it should apply even to those clans who had taken the government's side during the rising.

However, he was magnanimous to staff in the Lyon office who had supported the Jacobites. He intervened to protect them from punishment, ensured that their salaries were reinstated, and won a pardon from a death sentence one of his clerks.

== Death ==
Brodie died in London on 9 March 1754, of heart failure. His body was brought back to Moray and buried at Dyke, close to Brodie Castle.

== Family ==
His daughter, Emilia Brodie, married John MacLeod of MacLeod younger, only legitimate son of Norman MacLeod. She was the mother of Major General Norman MacLeod.

== Arms ==
Coat of arms of Alexander Brodie of that Ilk
Escutcheon Argent a chevron gules between three mullets azure.

Parliament of Great Britain
Preceded by James Brodie	Member of Parliament for Elginshire; 1720 – 1741	Succeeded by Ludovick Grant
Vacant alternating constituency with Buteshire Title last held by Patrick Dunbar	Member of Parliament for Caithness; 1741 – 1747	Vacant alternating constituency with Buteshire Title next held by John Scott
Preceded by Kenneth Mackenzie	Member of Parliament for Inverness Burghs; 1747 – 1754	Succeeded by John Campbell
Heraldic offices
Preceded by Alexander Erskine of Cambo	Lord Lyon King of Arms; 1727–1754	Succeeded by John Hooke-Campbell of Bangeston
