= Siege of Culloden House (1715) =

1715 siege

- Part of the Jacobite rising of 1715
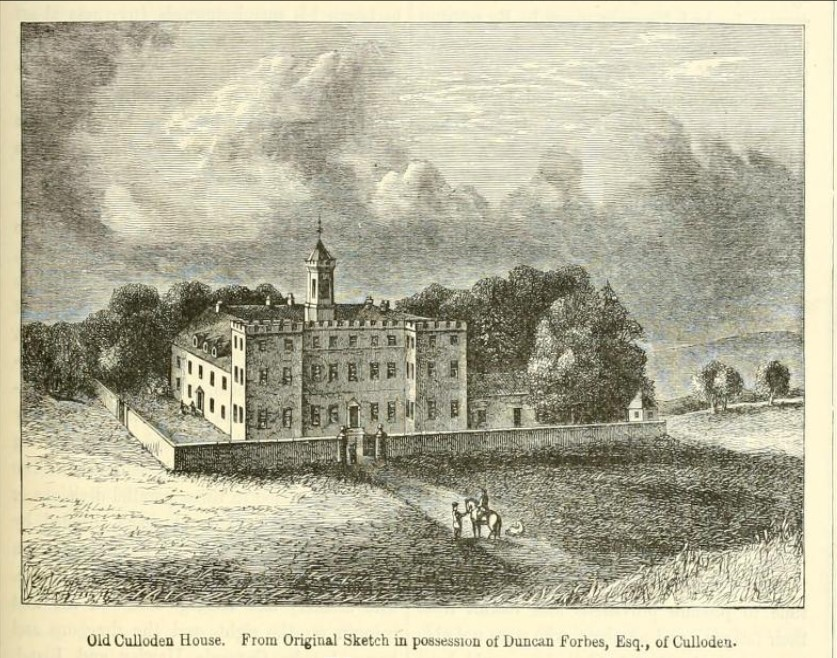
- Old Culloden House, Duncan Forbes
Date	1715
Location	Inverness-shire, Scotland, Great Britain 57.4904°N 4.1351°W
Result	Government victory

Belligerents
Great Britain	Jacobites from Clan Chattan

Commanders and leaders
Lady Forbes of Culloden; Hugh Fraser	Unknown

Strength
Unknown	700

Casualties and losses
None	Unknown
- Culloden House

The siege of Culloden House was part of the Jacobite rising of 1715 in Scotland.

== The siege ==
After the Jacobites had seized Inverness, some of them marched to Culloden House, which was held by the pro-Government Forbes family, and laid siege to it. They were told by the laird's wife that if they approached within gun-shot of the house that she would show them that she had both the arms and ammunition to support the right and title of George I of Great Britain. The house was besieged for seven weeks before it was relieved. Lady Forbes of Culloden and her servants managed to hold off a force of armed men. They were relieved with the assistance of Simon Fraser, 11th Lord Lovat who dispersed the force from Clan Chattan who controlled the area which in turn enabled him to gain the support of John Gordon, 16th Earl of Sutherland and John Forbes to give him freedom from arrest for treason. The men of the Clan Chattan having given up the siege joined the main Jacobite army under John Erskine, Earl of Mar at Perth on 5 October with 700 men. According to one source, during the siege a cannon shot had hit a tree and the falling timber killed one of the Jacobite rebels, with the tree subsequently being covered in a huge growth of ivy.

During the siege of 1715, Culloden House was defended by Hugh Fraser whose brother, James Fraser of Foyers, laid siege to the house during the Jacobite rising of 1745.

== See also ==
- Siege of Culloden House (1745)
- Battle of Culloden
