= Hugh Rose, 15th of Kilravock =

Scottish politician and laird (1663–1732)

The Right Honourable Hugh Rose 15th Baron of Kilravock
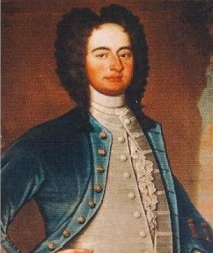
- Hugh Rose, 15th Baron of Kilravock by Richard Waitt

Lord Lieutenant of Ross-shire
- In office 1729–1732
- Preceded by: New office
- Succeeded by: James Brodie

Sheriff of Ross
- In office 1706–1722
- Preceded by: Sir Robert Munro
- Succeeded by: The Master of Kilravock

Shire Commissioner for Nairnshire
- In office 1707–1700 Serving with George Brodie (until 1702); Duncan Forbes (1702–03) and John Forbes (since 1704)
- Preceded by: John Hay
- Succeeded by: Nairnshire (UK Parliament constituency)

Member of Parliament for Nairnshire
- In office 1707–1708
- Preceded by: Nairnshire (Parliament of Scotland constituency)
- Succeeded by: Vacant

Personal details
- Born: 1 January 1663 Kilravock Castle, Nairnshire, Scotland
- Died: 23 January 1732 (aged 69) Kilravock Castle, Nairnshire, Scotland
- Spouse(s): Margaret Campbell (m. 1683–1690) Jean Fraser (m. 1692–1698) Beatrix Cuthbert (m. 1701–1703) Elizabeth Calder (m. 1704–1728) Katherine Porteous (m. 1730–1732)
- Children: 9
- Parents: Hugh Rose, 14th Baron of Kilravock (father); Margaret Innes (mother)

Coat of Arms of Clan Rose

Hugh Rose, 15th Baron of Kilravock and Chief of Clan Rose, (1663–1732) was one of the Scottish representatives to the first Parliament of Great Britain as MP for Nairnshire.

== Early life ==
Rose was born at Kilravock Castle the son of Hugh Rose, 14th of Kilravock, a member of the Parliament of Scotland for Nairnshire and his wife, Margaret Innes, daughter of Sir Robert Innes of Innes, 2nd Baronet. He inherited Kilravock on his father's death in 1687 along with the Barony of Kilravock and the Chiefdom of the Name and Arms of Clan Rose. On his father's death, the Rose estates were heavily encumbered, it was only by successive marriages to heiresses that the estates were saved and brought out of debt.

== Political career ==
Early in his career Rose began as a commissioner for Justice in the Highlands in 1693 and 1701. He was then returned as an MP for Nairnshire from 1700 until 1707. During his time in office, he remained in opposition, particularly to the Darien scheme. Rose served until 1707 at which point he became one of the Scottish representatives to the first Parliament of Great Britain. While one of the representatives, Rose refused to travel to London to represent his constituency and did not stand for re-election. He was also appointed Sheriff of Ross from 1706 to 1722 and also 1729–1732. While Sheriff, although he himself had resigned from Parliament, he used his position to appoint his son, Hugh MP for Ross-shire. Due to his abuse of power, the other major powers in Ross-shire, the Clans Ross and Munro petitioned to have him removed from office as Sheriff, for being a Jacobite Whig and ally of George Mackenzie, 1st Earl of Cromartie. However, Roses allies all supported him as the most loyal of Presbyterians. However, the following General election his son, Hugh was removed from office and both removed from public life for a while. Following the 1715 Uprising, Rose and his son moved more into the support of Argyll through their connection through the Campbells of Cawdor, at which point he lost the position of Sheriff of Ross. However, he later regained both the Sheriffdom and also the position of Lord Lieutenant of Ross-shire for his support.

== Military service ==
During the Jacobite rising of 1715, Rose fought for the Government and successfully besieged and took Inverness. As well as that, he kept the Kilravock garrison strong and held it against the rebels.

== Family ==
Rose married, firstly, Margaret Campbell, daughter of Sir Hugh Campbell, 5th of Cawdor and Lady Henrietta Stuart, daughter of James Stuart, 4th Earl of Moray, on 19 October 1683, they had three children.

- Hugh Rose, 16th of Kilravock (died 1755), MP for Ross-shire.
- Margaret Rose (died 1703), married Sir John Mackenzie of Coul, 3rd Baronet, had issue
- Mary Rose (died 1734), married Duncan Forbes, 5th of Culloden, had issue.

He married, secondly, Jean Fraser, daughter of James Fraser of Brea, in 1692, they had one child.

- James Rose (died 1762), married Margaret Rose, daughter of James Rose of Broadley, they were the parents of Hugh Rose of Brea and Broadley, husband of Elizabeth Rose, 19th of Kilravock.

He married by contract, thirdly, Beatrix Cuthbert, daughter of George Cuthbert of Castlehill, on 19 June 1701, they had two children.

- Magdalene Rose, married Alexander Mackenzie of Davochmalmac, son of Alexander Mackenzie and Elizabeth Rose.
- Jean Rose

He married, fourthly, Elizabeth Calder, daughter of Sir James Calder, 1st Baronet and Grizel Innes, in 1704, they had one child.

- Margaret Rose, married Charles Campbell, son of Sir Charles Campbell of Clunie.

He married, fifthly, Katherine Porteous, daughter of James Porteous, in 1730, they had two children.

- Arthur Rose
- Alexander Rose

Rose died of a fever of cold at Kilravock, on 23 January 1732, and was buried with his forebears in the chapel of Geddes. An 18th-century panegyric conceals the quick temper and shiftiness of its subject in a portrait which would have done more credit to his mother's devout Presbyterianism than to the family's recurring talent for compromise:

The laird of Kilravock was of ... a daring and bold spirit in time of danger, but otherwise mild, affable and condescending. His judgment was clear and solid, and his conduct uniform and equal ... and, which was the great ornament of his life, he was a gentleman of shining piety and virtue, sincere and constant in his devotion to God, faithful and just in his dealings with men, peaceable and benevolent towards his neighbours, a pattern of virtue in his family ... he despised the growing luxury and vanity of the age, and he rather affected a primitive simplicity than studied the politeness and effeminacy of the times.

Peerage of Scotland
Preceded by Hugh Rose	Baron of Kilravock; 1687–1732	Succeeded by Hugh Rose
Honorary titles
New office	Lord Lieutenant of Ross-shire; 1729–1732	Succeeded by James Brodie
Parliament of Scotland
Preceded by John Hay	Shire Commissioner for Nairnshire; 1700– 1707	Succeeded by Himself (Parliament of Great Britain)
Parliament of Great Britain
Preceded by Himself; Serving with John Forbes (Parliament of Scotland)	Member of Parliament for Nairnshire; 1707– 1708	Vacant
