= Duncan Forbes =

Duncan Forbes may refer to:

- Duncan Forbes of Culloden (politician, died 1654), Scottish politician and burgh commissioner for Inverness
- Duncan Forbes, 3rd of Culloden (1644–1704), Scottish politician and supporter of the House of Hanover, grandson of the above
- Duncan Forbes, 3rd of Culloden (1685–1747), Scottish politician and judge, son of the above
- Duncan Forbes (linguist) (1798–1868), Scottish linguist
- Duncan Forbes (historian) (1922–1994), Scottish historian
- Duncan Forbes (footballer) (1941–2019), Scottish footballer
- Duncan Forbes (poet) (born 1947), British poet
- Duncan Forbes (Royal Marines officer), British major-general
