= Ferintosh =

Ferintosh is the name of more than one place, including:

- Ferintosh, Alberta in Canada
- Ferintosh, Black Isle in Scotland
