= Ferintosh, Black Isle =

Estate on Black Isle, Scotland

Ferintosh is the name of an estate in the Black Isle, Ross and Cromarty, Scotland. Urquhart is the name of the parish. The parish of Urquhart is virtually the original Ferintosh barony and was an exclave of Nairnshire until transferred to Ross and Cromarty in 1892 under the Local Government (Scotland) Act 1889. Its owner, Duncan Forbes (1644–1704) of Culloden, was also a major landowner in Nairnshire.

In the 21st century, due to amalgamations a Ferintosh "Parish" Church is at nearby Conon Bridge. The former Urquhart Parish Church is close to the Ferintosh Burn (see below).

During the 1688 Glorious Revolution in Scotland, Forbes was a prominent supporter of the new regime and the Ferintosh Distillery was destroyed by the Jacobites. In 1690, he was granted the right to distil whisky in Ferintosh without being subject to the normal excise regulations. In the 1760s, his grandson John Forbes enlarged the existing distillery and built three more. In 1965, the Ben Wyvis distillery in nearby Dingwall changed its name to Ferintosh but ceased operations in 1977.

A natural amphitheatre at the Ferintosh Burn was used for open-air gatherings during Presbyterian communion seasons in the 18th and 19th centuries.

Ferintosh Free Church has a much closer link to Ferintosh, as this is where Dr John MacDonald (1779–1849) ministered. He was a notable minister of the parish. John Kennedy, Free Church minister of Dingwall, wrote a biography of him entitled The Apostle of the North. As suggested by the title, MacDonald preached the gospel in many parts of northern Scotland.

Rev Donald Munro, minister of Ferintosh Free church, served as Moderator of the General Assembly in 1918.

== Sources ==
- Du Toit, Alexandre (2004). "Forbes, Duncan (b. in or after 1643, d. 1704)". Oxford Dictionary of National Biography (online ed.). Oxford University Press. doi:10.1093/ref:odnb/9821. (Subscription, Wikipedia Library access or UK public library membership required.)
