= Ferintosh Distillery =

Whisky distillery

The Ferintosh distillery at Mulchaich
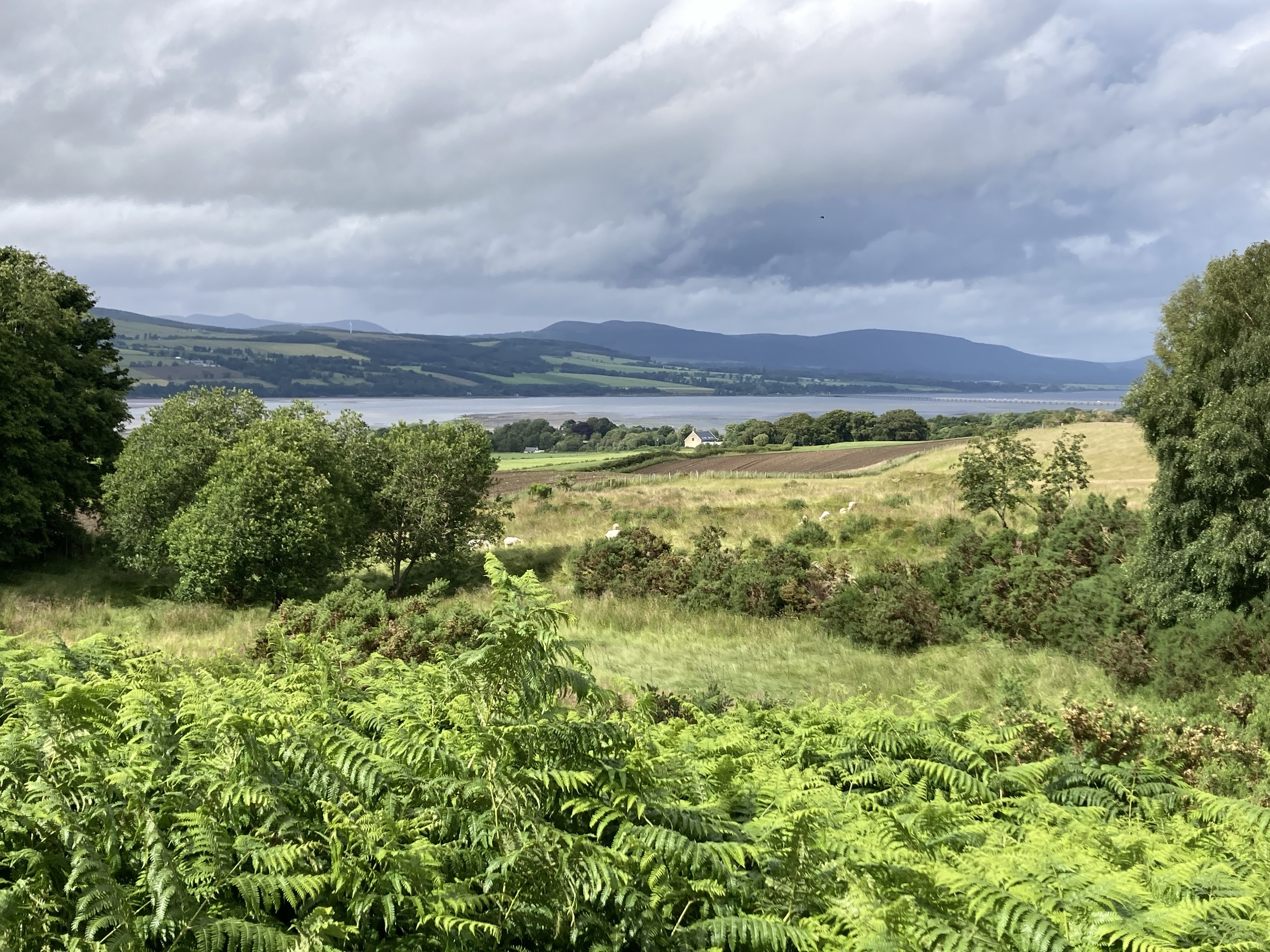

Region: Highland
- Location: Urquhart and Logie Wester, Scotland
- Owner: Duncan Forbes, 3rd of Culloden
- Founded: 1689
- Status: Closed
- Water source: Ryefield Burn, Castle Burn

Ferintosh distillery produced whisky at more than one location on the Black Isle north of Inverness from 1689 until its closure in 1786. The name is thought to have been anglicised from Fearann an Tòisich, ‘the estate of the thane’, the land having once belonged to the Thane of Cawdor. The brand was reprieved by the Ben Wyvis distillery across the water in Dingwall between 1893 and 1926.

== Location ==
At least four separate individual distilleries manufactured Ferintosh whisky under a unique historical exemption from payment of excise duty in the early eighteenth century. Production was concentrated on the north-west slopes of the Black Isle within the parish of Urquhart and Logie Wester, the lands of Ferintosh having been purchased by John Forbes, 2nd of Culloden, in 1669. Around that time, the parish became a detached part of the County of Nairn surrounded by Ross-shire.

‘An Isle but not an island, located in the Highlands but essentially lowland in character, intensively managed but sometimes surprising in its wildness, the Black Isle is a land of contradictions and contrasts’, writes local ecologist Ro Scott. The lands of Ferintosh are underlain by Old Red Sandstone which has been reworked into a thick layer of glacial till. On top of this substrate, a freely draining podzol developed which is suitable for cultivation: soil surveyors noted a high concentration of small crofting units in the area. Whisky made here might be classified as ‘Highland’, but the topography is smooth and undulating, the soil rich and dark, and the climate mild and maritime. Local placenames Corntown and Ryefield reflect the arable wealth of the area and emphasize its suitability for whisky production.

Compared with a modern population of little over 500 people, the Statistical Account of Scotland for the year 1779 recorded 3022 souls in the parish occupying 2901 homes.

== Exemption ==
The concept of levying a tax on commodities was imported from the Netherlands in the early seventeenth century. The first attempt to introduce excise to British shores was made by one Julius Caesar, who was Master of the Rolls to Charles I in 1627. The tax was immediately unpopular, described as ‘monstrum, horrendum’ by the Speaker of the House of Commons. Samuel Johnson’s definition of the word ‘excise’ caused him to be threatened with libel by the Attorney General in 1755. Dr Johnson was given the opportunity to amend his dictionary, but he was unabashed. His impartial definition remains: ‘a hateful tax … adjudged by wretches’.

Year	Event
1621	A system of excise partially enacted in Edinburgh
1627	An early attempt to introduce excise in England
1643	Parliamentary Ordinance on excise duty
1669	Lands of Ferintosh bought by John Forbes, 2nd of Culloden
1688	Duncan Forbes, 3rd of Culloden, raised an army
1689	Ferintosh distillery sacked in retaliation by the Jacobites
1690	Act of Parliament in favour of Duncan Forbes
1760	Construction of three more distilleries at Ferintosh
1784	The Wash Act ends the privilege; the Ferintosh distilleries close

Ferintosh distillery was a special case. In the Wars of the Three Kingdoms, the Forbes family sided with the government, making them unpopular with many locals. While John’s son Duncan Forbes, 3rd of Culloden, was absent on government business in Holland in 1689, his house and crops were sacked by the Jacobites, and all the whisky stills destroyed.

Forbes was compensated for his loss by an Act of Parliament affording him the right to distil whisky free from excise duty in perpetuity, on payment of an annual fee of four hundred Merks Scots, then worth about £20 a year.

Three additional distilleries were created on the lands of Ferintosh by Duncan Forbes, 5th of Culloden. One was built at Gallowhill Farm, another just north of Mulchaich Farm near the chambered cairn and a third new distillery appears to have been located on or near Mulchaich Farm itself. One of these, north of Mulchaich Farm, was the subject of excavation in 2009 by North of Scotland Archaeological Society.

== Reputation ==
Dating from 1763, Glenturret is probably the oldest working distillery in Scotland. Strathisla distillery has operated continuously since 1786. A recently uncovered record in Dumbarton suggests that Littlemill was granted a license in 1773. With an Act of Parliament from 1690, Ferintosh can claim to be considerably older. By the late eighteenth century, more whisky was being made at Ferintosh than in the rest of the country put together, and whisky made elsewhere was being smuggled into the area to evade taxation.

Robert Burns lamented the end of Ferintosh production in his 1785 poem ‘Scotch Drink’:

Thee Ferintosh ! O sadly lost !
Scotland lament frae coast to coast !
Now colic-grips, an’ barkin hoast,
May kill us a’;
For loyal Forbes’ charter’d boast
Is ta’en awa !

Ferintosh was used as a synonym for whisky generally, as in Edwin Morgan’s ‘Canedolia’:

tell us about last night
well, we had a wee ferintosh and we lay on the quiraing. It was pure strontian!

Regional variations in whisky were explored in a small book titled ‘Whisky’ published in 1930 by George Malcolm Thomson writing under the pseudonym Aeneas MacDonald to avoid offending his teetotal mother. Thomson was born a hundred years after the Ferintosh privilege came to an end. A whisky called Ferintosh was being bottled at the Ben Wyvis distillery in Dingwall causing Thomson to suggest Burns had been premature in his lament; however this new Ferintosh whisky barely warranted mention amongst his whiskies of the east Highlands.

With the ending of the Ferintosh privilege, ‘the whole population, abnormally swollen by the whisky monopoly … hundreds of men and women, thoroughly instructed in the art of distillation, emigrated with all their technical knowledge to other parts’, notably Campbeltown. Although Campbeltown provided whisky for the export market to America for more than a century, production in that town didn’t hit an all-time high until after Prohibition began in the United States. A well-known loophole in the Volstead Act allowed the sale of whisky as ‘medicinal alcohol’, and pharmacies grew in both size and number.
