= Henry Frederick Campbell =

British Army general

General Sir Henry Frederick Campbell GCH KCB
- Born: 10 July 1769
- Died: 3 September 1856 (aged 87)
- Military career
- Allegiance: Kingdom of Great Britain (to 1800); United Kingdom (from 1801)
- Branch: (United Kingdom) British Army
- Service years: from 1786
- Rank: General
- Commands: 1st Division
- Conflicts: French Revolutionary Wars; Battle of Boxtel; Napoleonic Wars; Battle of the Douro; Battle of Talavera; Siege of Ciudad Rodrigo; Battle of Salamanca; Siege of Burgos
- Awards: Army Gold Medal; Knight Commander of the Order of the Bath; Knight Grand Cross of the Royal Guelphic Order
- Other work: MP for Nairnshire

General Sir Henry Frederick Campbell, GCH, KCB (10 July 1769 – 3 September 1856) was a soldier of the British Army. He joined the 1st Regiment of Foot Guards in 1786 and from 1793 served with them in the defence of the Dutch Republic against France, seeing action at the Battle of Boxtel. As a colonel Campbell was deployed to Sicily in 1806-1807. He was appointed brigadier-general in 1808 and commanded the 2nd Brigade of Guards in the Peninsular War. After a brief interlude in Britain, recovering from a wound received at the July 1809 Battle of Talavera he was promoted to lieutenant-general. Campbell returned to Spain and commanded the 1st Division at the siege of Ciudad Rodrigo, the battle of Salamanca and the siege of Burgos, receiving the thanks of parliament and the Army Gold Medal for his efforts. He was promoted to lieutenant-general in 1814 and to full general in 1837. Campbell served as Member of Parliament for Nairnshire in 1792-1802 and 1806-1807.

== Early life and family ==
He was the only son of Lieutenant-Colonel Alexander Campbell (third son of John Campbell of Cawdor) by his wife Frances, daughter of Philip Medows, the deputy ranger of Richmond Park and son of Sir Philip Meadowes. He was educated at Greenwich from 1778 to 1780, and in November 1785 succeeded his father. On 10 April 1808 he married Emma, daughter of Thomas Williams of Temple House, Berkshire; they had one son, George Herbert Frederick Campbell, and two daughters, Henrietta Frances Campbell and Frances Augusta Campbell. His wife had three sons from her previous marriage to Lieutenant-Colonel Thomas Knox, a nephew of Thomas Knox, 1st Viscount Northland.

== Military career ==
Campbell joined the Army on 20 September 1786 as an ensign in the 1st Regiment of Foot Guards. In February 1793 he was deployed with British forces in the defence of the Dutch Republic, and on 25 April was promoted to lieutenant, with the Army rank of captain. He returned to England in May, but was back on the Continent from June 1794 until returning to take up a staff post in December; during this period he served at the Battle of Boxtel. On 6 April 1796 he was made captain of a company in the Guards, with the rank of lieutenant-colonel in the Army, and on 25 September 1803 he was made aide-de-camp to the King, with brevet rank as a colonel. He was deployed to the defence of Sicily against the French in 1806-1807.

In December 1808 Campbell went to Portugal as brigadier-general commanding the 2nd Brigade of Guards. He commanded the brigade at the Battle of the Douro in May 1809 and at the Battle of Talavera. At Talavera he was wounded in the face and had to return to the United Kingdom; on 1 February 1810 he received the thanks of Parliament for his part in the battle and on 25 July he was promoted to major-general. He returned to Portugal in April 1811 to resume command of his brigade, then commanded the 1st Division during 1812 at the siege of Ciudad Rodrigo, the battle of Salamanca and the siege of Burgos. On 3 December he was again thanked by Parliament, for his services at Salamanca. For Talavera and Salamanca he was awarded the Army Gold Medal with one clasp; on 2 October 1813 he was made third major of the 1st Foot Guards, and on 4 June 1814 he was promoted to lieutenant-general. He was made a Knight Commander of the Order of the Bath on 2 January 1815, colonel of the 88th Regiment of Foot on 16 January 1824, colonel of the 25th Regiment of Foot on 20 October 1831, and promoted to general on 10 January 1837.

== Civil career ==
In 1792 Campbell succeeded his maternal uncle Charles Pierrepont in the sinecure post of prothonotary to the Palace Court; he would hold the office until the Court was abolished in 1849. From 1796 to 1802 and from 1806 to 1807 he was Member of Parliament for Nairnshire, returned through the influence of his cousin John Campbell, 1st Baron Cawdor. From about 1809 he was a groom of the bedchamber to King George III, continuing in the same post at the King's court at Windsor during the Regency. He was secretary and comptroller to Queen Charlotte from 1817 to 1818, and was made a Knight Grand Cross of the Royal Guelphic Order in 1818.

Parliament of Great Britain
Preceded by Alexander Brodie (to 1790)	Member of Parliament for Nairnshire; 1796–1800	Succeeded by Parliament of the United Kingdom
Parliament of the United Kingdom
Preceded by Parliament of Great Britain	Member of Parliament for Nairnshire; 1801–1802; 1806–1807	Succeeded by Hugh Rose (from 1812)
Military offices
Preceded by Sir Gordon Drummond	Colonel of the 88th Regiment of Foot; 1824–1831	Succeeded by Sir John Wallace
Preceded by Charles FitzRoy	Colonel of the 25th Regiment of Foot; 1831–1856	Succeeded by Sir Henry Somerset
