= Nairnshire (Parliament of Scotland constituency) =

Parliament of Scotland constituency

Nairnshire was a constituency of the Parliament of Scotland before the Union with England in 1707. The barons of the shire or sheriffdom of Nairn elected two commissioners to represent them in the Parliament and in the Convention of Estates.

At the time of the Union Hugh Rose, commissioner for Nairnshire was chosen as one of the Scottish representatives to the first Parliament of Great Britain. From 1708, Nairnshire elected one Member of Parliament to the British House of Commons.

== List of shire commissioners ==
- 1617, 1628–1633: John Dunbar of Moynes
- 1628–1633, 1630 convention: John Campbell of Calder
- 1639–1641: James Grant of Moyness
- 1643 convention: Alexander Dunbar of Boath
- 1646–1647, 1648: Hugh Rose of Kilravock
- 1646–1647, 1648: Alexander Brodie of Lethen
- 1661–1663: Sir Hugh Campbell of Calder, sheriff
- 1661–63, 1667 convention: James Grant of Moynes
- 1665 convention: Hugh Rose of Clava
- 1669–1674, 1678 convention, 1681–82: Sir Hugh Campbell of Calder
- 1678 (convention), 1681–1682: Duncan Forbes of Culloden
- 1685–1686: Hugh Rose of Kilravock
- 1685–1686, 1689 (convention), 1689–1693: Sir Hugh Campbell of Calder (expelled 1693)
- 1689 convention, 1689–1693: John Hay of Lochley (died c.1693)
- 1689: David Brodie of Lethen
- 1693–1702: George Brodie of Aslisk
- 1693–1695: Alexander Campbell of Calder (died c.1698)
- 1700–1702, 1702–1707: Hugh Rose of Kilravock
- 1702–1703: Duncan Forbes of Culloden (died 1704)
- 1704–1707: John Forbes of Culloden
