= James Brodie (politician, born 1695) =

British politician (d. 1720)

James Brodie, 18th of Brodie (1695 – 2 October 1720), was a Scottish clan chief and politician who sat in the House of Commons in 1720.

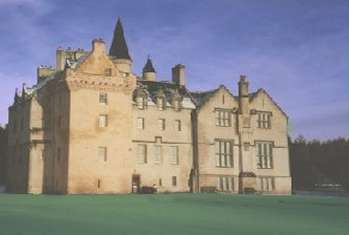
Brodie Castle-seat of the Brodie clan

Broadie was the eldest son of George Brodie of Ailisk. He was educated at Marischal College in Aberdeen, and in 1714 he succeeded to his father's estates and to the chieftainship of the Clan Brodie. The following year, he supported the government side in the Jacobite rising of 1715.

In the Parliament of Great Britain, he was elected at a by-election in January 1720 as the Member of Parliament (MP) for Elginshire. He died later that year, aged 25, of "a headache which put him in a fever". His younger brother Alexander succeeded him as clan chief, and was elected in his place as MP for Elginshire.

Parliament of Great Britain
Preceded by Alexander Grant	Member of Parliament for Elginshire; January 1720 – October 1720	Succeeded by Alexander Brodie
