= Donald Munro (moderator) =

Donald Munro (1860–1937) was a Scottish minister in the 19th and 20th centuries, who served as Moderator of the General Assembly of the Free Church of Scotland in 1919.

== Life ==
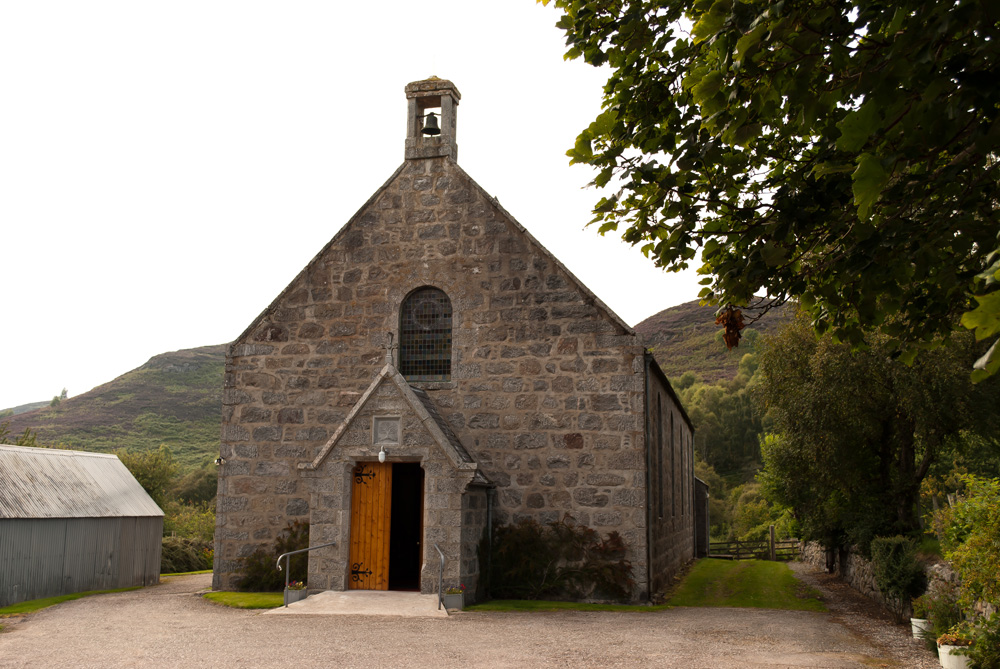
Rogart Free Church

Munro was born on 4 September 1860 at Strathbrora farm in Clyne in Sutherland, the son of a shepherd, John Munro, and his wife, Jessie Grant. He had a basic education but worked as a teacher in his area until 1889.

From 1889 to 1893 he trained as a Free Church minister at New College in Edinburgh. In 1894 he was ordained as minister of the Free Church of Ferintosh, Black Isle.

At the Union of 1900 the Rev Mr Munro declined to join the new church and opted to remain in the (then minority) Free Church.

On or before this period he became involved in the creation of the Scottish Psalter: a group of plainsong psalms sung in a particular style, popular with the Free Church, and frequently in Gaelic.

In 1918 he succeeded the Rev John Macleod of Urray as Moderator.

In November 1935 he translated to be minister of Rogart. He died there in June 1937.
