= Inverness-shire (Parliament of Scotland constituency) =

Before the Acts of Union 1707, the barons of the shire of Inverness elected commissioners to represent them in the unicameral Parliament of Scotland and in the Convention of the Estates.

From 1708 Inverness-shire was represented by one Member of Parliament in the House of Commons of Great Britain.

== List of shire commissioners ==
- 1628–33, 1639–40, 1644–47: Sir John Mackenzie, 1st Baronet of Tarbat
- 1630: Sir Robert Gordon, 1st Baronet
- 1646–47: Laird of Kynneries
- 1646–47, 1649: Sir James Fraser of Brae
- 1649: Sir Robert Munro, 3rd Baronet of Foulis
- 1649–51: William Fraser of Culbokie
- 1661–63: Sir John Urquhart of Cromarty
- 1661–63: Collene McKenzie of Reidcastell
- 1665 convention: William Robertson of Inchis
- 1667 convention: not represented
- 1669–74: Lauchlan McIntosh of Torrcastle
- 1669–74: John Forbes of Culloden
- 1678 (convention): Hew Fraser of Belladrum
- 1678 (convention): John Macleod of Dunvegan
- 1881–82(in lieu of the Laird of Dunvegan, ill), 1685–86: Laughlan McIntosh of Torcastle
- 1685–86: Hugh Fraser the younger of Belladrum
- 1689 (convention), 1689-1702: Duncan Forbes of Culloden
- 1689 (convention), 1689–1701, 1702–05: Ludovick Grant of that Ilk
- 1702-07: Alexander Grant of that Ilk

== See also ==
- List of constituencies in the Parliament of Scotland at the time of the Union
