= Siege of Culloden House (1745) =

1745 Scottish conflict

- Part of the Jacobite rising of 1745
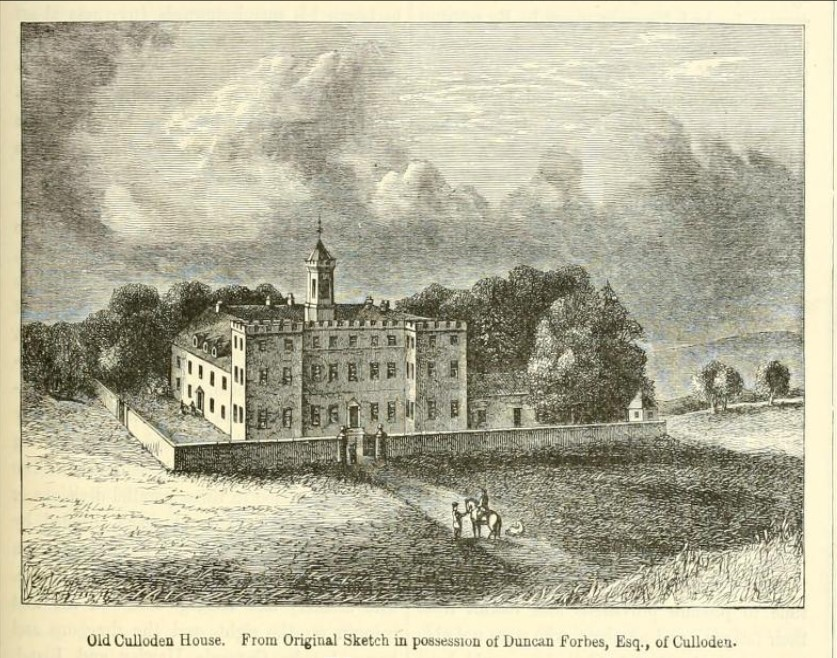
- Old Culloden House, Duncan Forbes
Date	15–16 October 1745
Location	Inverness-shire, Scotland, Great Britain
Result	Government victory

Belligerents
(Kingdom of Great Britain) Government	Jacobites

Commanders and leaders
Duncan Forbes	Simon Fraser

Strength
Unknown	200

Casualties and losses
None	1 killed 1 wounded

The siege of Culloden House took place on the night of 15/16 October 1745 and was part of the Jacobite rising of 1745. 200 men of the Jacobite Clan Fraser of Lovat attempted to capture Duncan Forbes, Lord Culloden who was the Lord President of the Court of Session, the most senior legal officer in Scotland.

== Background ==
Simon Fraser, 11th Lord Lovat, chief of the Clan Fraser of Lovat, had for a long time held back in committing himself to the Jacobite cause. However, according to historian Christopher Duffy he sent one of his leading clansmen, James Fraser of Foyers, to kidnap Duncan Forbes, Lord Culloden who was the leader of the British-Hanoverian cause in the north-east of Scotland. Historian Sarah Fraser, however, states that Lovat did not want anything to do with the kidnapping of his old friend Duncan Forbes of Culloden. Sarah Fraser states that the Jacobite leader Charles Edward Stuart issued an order at Holyrood House on 23 September 1745 that was addressed to James Fraser of Foyers who was head of the aggressively Jacobite Stratherick men to carry Duncan Forbes as "prisoner to us at Edinburgh". Lovat actually wrote to Duncan Forbes informing him that he was about to be kidnapped and Forbes fortified and garrisoned Culloden House.

== Siege ==
200 of the Stratherrick Frasers advanced on the battlemented Culloden House. They were led by Fraser of Foyers and Fraser of Byerfield who was Lovat's aggressive chamberlain. According to Duffy they scampered off when they came under fire. As the Jacobites approached they were met with a rally of gunfire and a Swivel gun was also used to fire at them. According to Sarah Fraser, some of John Campbell, Lord Loudoun's men from his Independent Company^{[A]} had been on sentry duty who the Jacobites exchanged musket fire with, but as cannon balls tore into their cover, the Jacobites fled. The Jacobites had suffered one man killed. A search of the area the next day found another Jacobite who was wounded and who confessed that they had been led by James Fraser of Foyers and had been sent by Lord Lovat. According to Alexander Mackenzie's History of the Frasers of Lovat, the Stratherrick men failed to take Culloden House, referring to it as the Castle of Culloden, which was strongly fortified and had several pieces of cannon on its ramparts.

== Aftermath ==
According to Sarah Fraser, Lovat wrote to Duncan Forbes apologising for the "base barbarous, inhuman, and distracted attempt and behaviour" of the Stratherick men at Culloden House. Lovat also said that his son, the Master of Lovat, was on the point of leaving to join the rebels, taking hundreds with him, and that he was powerless to stop him. Lord Loudoun (John Campbell, 4th Earl of Loudoun) who supported the British-Hanoverian Government, suspecting the loyalty of Lord Lovat, sent an expedition to Castle Downie on 11 December 1745 where they captured Lovat and brought him back as a prisoner to Inverness. However, Lovat escaped to freedom on the night of 19 December 1745. According to historian Ruairidh MacLeod, the reaction in the Highlands to the unsuccessful attempt of James Fraser of Foyers to capture or kill the Lord President Forbes at Culloden House, was of profound shock.

In April 1746, the Jacobite leader Charles Edward Stuart requisitioned Culloden House and used it as his headquarters in the days leading up to the more famous Battle of Culloden that brought an end to the Jacobite rising.

== See also ==
- Battle of Culloden
- Siege of Culloden House (1715)

== Notes ==
- A The source from Sarah Fraser refers to the Independent Highland Companies that were raised by Duncan Forbes of Culloden, however Lord Loudoun had his own companies of soldiers in Loudon's Highlanders who were also "independent" at this time as they were not regimented until 1747 and therefore they are often confused with the Independent Highland Companies raised by Forbes of Culloden.
