= Duncan Forbes, 3rd of Culloden =

Scottish politician

Duncan Forbes of Culloden

Commissioner for Nairnshire
- In office 1703–1704
- Monarch: Anne
- Preceded by: Hugh Rose of Kilvarock
- Succeeded by: John Forbes

Commissioner for Inverness-shire
- In office 1689–1702
- Monarch: William II
- Preceded by: Hugh Fraser of Belladrum
- Succeeded by: Alexander Grant

Commissioner for Nairnshire
- In office 1678–1686

Personal details
- Born: 1644 Culloden House, Inverness, Scotland
- Died: 24 June 1704 (aged 60) Edinburgh
- Spouse: Marie Innes (d 1678?)
- Children: John (1673–1734); Jean (ca 1678–?); Margaret; Duncan (1685–1747); four others died young
- Parent(s): John Forbes, 2nd of Culloden (died ca 1688); Anna Dunbar (died after 1716)
- Education: Marischal College, Aberdeen; University of Bourges
- Occupation: Politician

Arms of Forbes of Culloden: Azure on a chevron between three bears' heads couped argent, muzzled and langued gules, as many unicorns' heads erased sable.

Duncan Forbes 3rd of Culloden (1644–1704) was a politician and member of the Parliament of Scotland between 1678 and 1704. He was a strong supporter of Whiggism, a political philosophy developed during the 1638 to 1651 Wars of the Three Kingdoms, which advocated the supremacy of Parliament over the monarch and opposed Catholicism.

Two of his sons, John (1673–1734), and Duncan (1685–1747), played prominent roles in dealing with the Jacobite rising of 1715 and its aftermath; Duncan also played a similar role in respect of the rising of 1745.

== Life ==
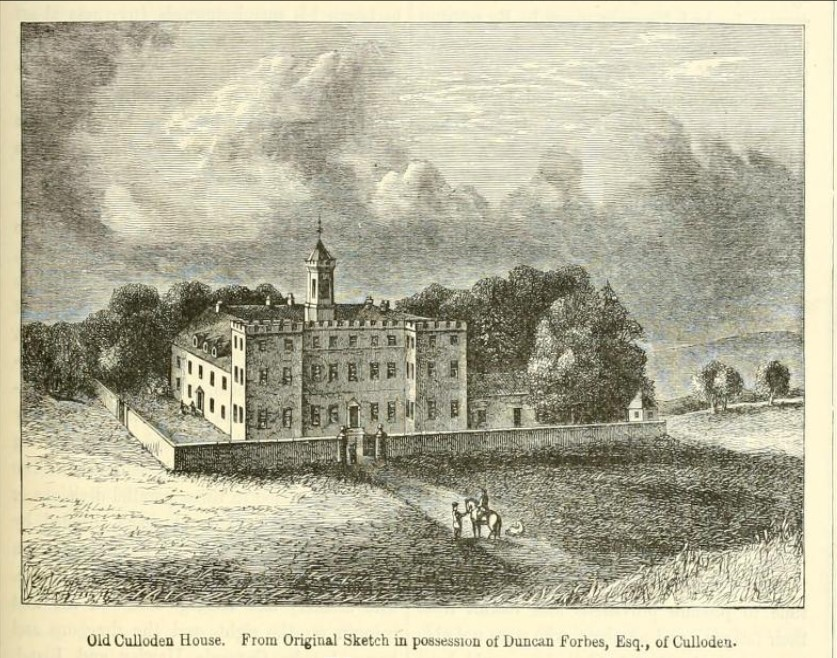
Old Culloden House

Duncan Forbes was born in 1644 during the 1638 to 1651 Wars of the Three Kingdoms, eldest son of John Forbes (1609–1687), 2nd of Culloden near Inverness, and his wife Anna Dunbar (died after 1716). He had six siblings, David (b. 1644), Jonathan (b. 1656), John (1658–1707), Jean (1659 – after 1693), Naomi (b. 1662) and Alexander (d. 1769).

In 1668, he married Mary Innes, daughter of Sir Robert, 2nd Baron Innes (1619–89), who built Innes House, near Elgin. They had nine children, including John, Jean (b. c. 1678), Margaret and Duncan; little is known of the other five.

== Career ==
In 1656, Forbes enrolled at Marischal College, Aberdeen, before moving to the University of Bourges in France a year later; he also spent time in Paris. In this period, lack of suitable legal training at home meant Scots seeking to practice law often studied at Bourges, Paris or Orléans.

The Forbes and Dunbars were prominent in local government, his father and other members of the family serving as Provost or Mayor of Inverness. However, his marriage to Marie Innes was a significant step up in the social scale; in 1812, the sixth baronet became Duke of Roxburghe. Forbes compiled a genealogy of his wife's family in 1698, titled 'Ane account of the familie of Innes', which was used by later writers.

Forbes represented Nairnshire in the Scottish convention held from June to July 1678; 'Conventions' were identical to the Parliament of Scotland in composition but only discussed specific issues, in this case approving taxes. In 1673, it became public that James, then Duke of York, had converted to Catholicism; as heir to his brother Charles II, this caused great concern and led to the 1679 to 1681 Exclusion Crisis in England. There was more support for James in Scotland; Forbes was a member of the 1681 Parliament, which passed the Scottish Succession Act, confirming James' right to the throne, 'regardless of religion' and obliged all officials to support him. However, the Test Act passed at the same time added the qualifier they also 'uphold the true Protestant religion'. Tolerance for James' personal beliefs did not extend to Catholicism in general, a distinction he failed to appreciate and ultimately led to his deposition in 1688.

James succeeded as king in February 1685. A devout Presbyterian, Forbes was not elected to the 1685 Parliament, which was dissolved in 1686. After James was deposed in the 1688 Glorious Revolution, Forbes was elected Commissioner for Invernessshire in the April Convention of Estates, held to settle the Scottish throne. Of the 125 delegates elected, 75 were classed as Presbyterian, 50 as Episcopalian, making the Convention a contest over control of the Church of Scotland, as well as the limits of Royal authority. He represented Invernessshire in the parliament of 1689–1702, and Nairnshire in the parliament of 1702.

He died in 1704.

== Sources ==
- Du Toit, Alexandre (2004). "Forbes, Duncan (b. in or after 1643, d. 1704)". Oxford Dictionary of National Biography (Online ed.). Oxford University Press. doi:10.1093/ref:odnb/9821. (Subscription, Wikipedia Library access or UK public library membership required.)
- Harris, Tim (2006). Revolution: The Great Crisis of the British Monarchy 1685–1720. Allen Lane.
- Harris, Tim; Taylor, Stephen, eds. (2015). The Final Crisis of the Stuart Monarchy. Boydell & Brewer. ISBN 978-1783270446.
- Houston, Robert A. (2017). Hutson, Lorna (ed.). Law & Literature in Scotland, c 1450 to 1707 in The Oxford Handbook of English Law and Literature, 1500–1700. OUP. ISBN 978-0199660889.
- Jackson, Clare (2003). Restoration Scotland, 1660–1690: Royalist Politics, Religion and Ideas. Boydell Press. ISBN 978-0851159300.

Parliament of Scotland
Preceded by George Brodie; Hugh Rose	Commissioner for Nairnshire; 1703–1704; With: Hugh Rose	Succeeded by Hugh Rose; John Forbes
Preceded by Hugh Fraser; Laughlan McIntosh	Commissioner for Inverness-shire; 1689–1702; With: Ludovick Grant	Succeeded by Alexander Grant; Ludovick Grant
