= William Aikman (painter) =

Scottish painter (1682–1731)

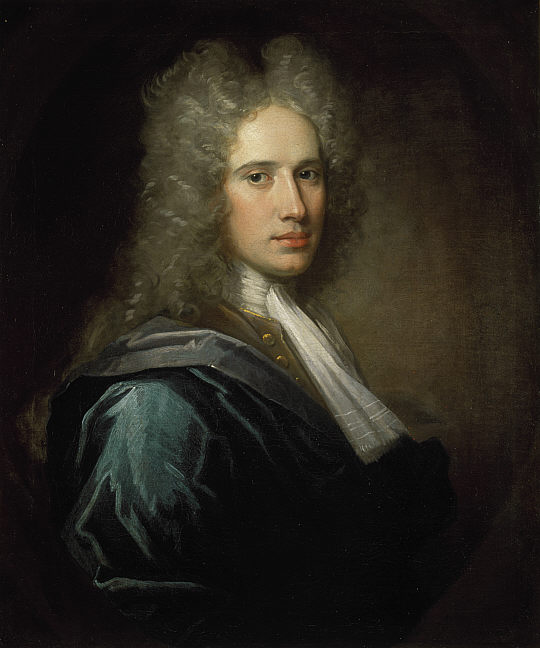
A self-portrait of Aikman

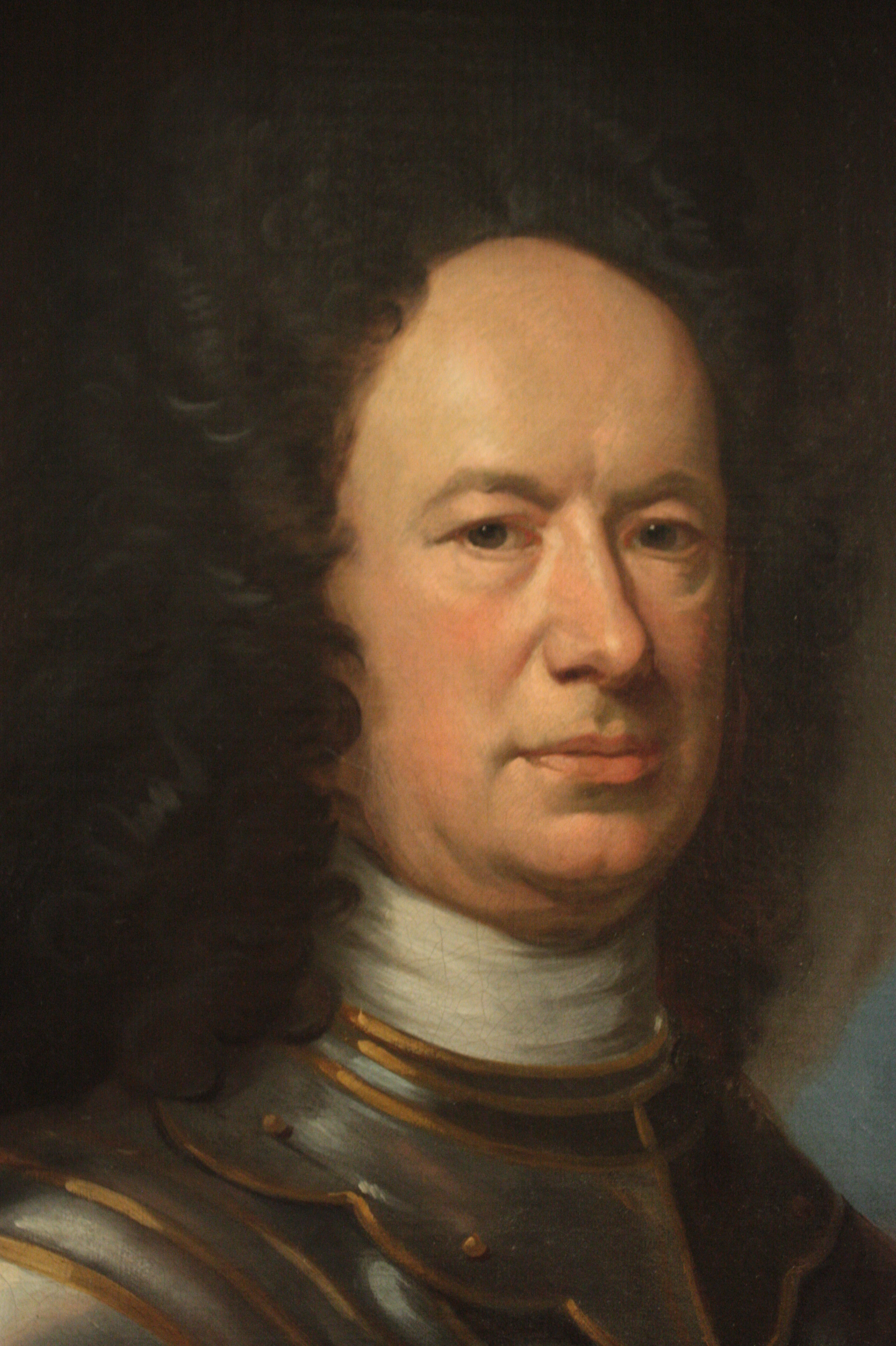
Lt Col Alexander Campbell by William Aikman

William Aikman (24 October 1682 – 7 June 1731) was a Scottish painter.

== Life and career ==
Aikman was the son of William Aikman, of Cairney. His father intended that he should follow the law, and gave him an education suitable to these views; but the strong predilection of the son to the fine arts induced him to attach himself to painting alone. Poetry, painting, and music have, with justice, been called sister arts. Aikman was fond of poetry; and was particularly delighted with those unforced strains which, proceeding from the heart, are calculated to touch the congenial feelings of sympathetic minds. It was this propensity that attached him so warmly to Allan Ramsay, the Doric bard of Scotland. Though younger than Ramsay, Aikman, while at college, formed an intimate acquaintance with him, which constituted a principal part of his happiness at that time, and of which he always bore the tenderest recollection. It was the same delicate bias of mind which at a future period of his life attached him so warmly to Thomson, who then unknown, and unprotected, stood in need of, and obtained the warmest patronage of Aikman; who perhaps considered it as one of the most fortunate occurrences in his life that he had it in his power to introduce this young poet of nature to Sir Robert Walpole, who wished to be reckoned the patron of genius, and to Arbuthnot, Swift, Pope, Gay, and the other beaux esprits of that brilliant period. Thomson could never forget this kindness; and when he had the misfortune, too soon, to lose this warm friend and kind protector, he bewailed the loss in strains distinguished by justness of thought, and genuine pathos of expression.

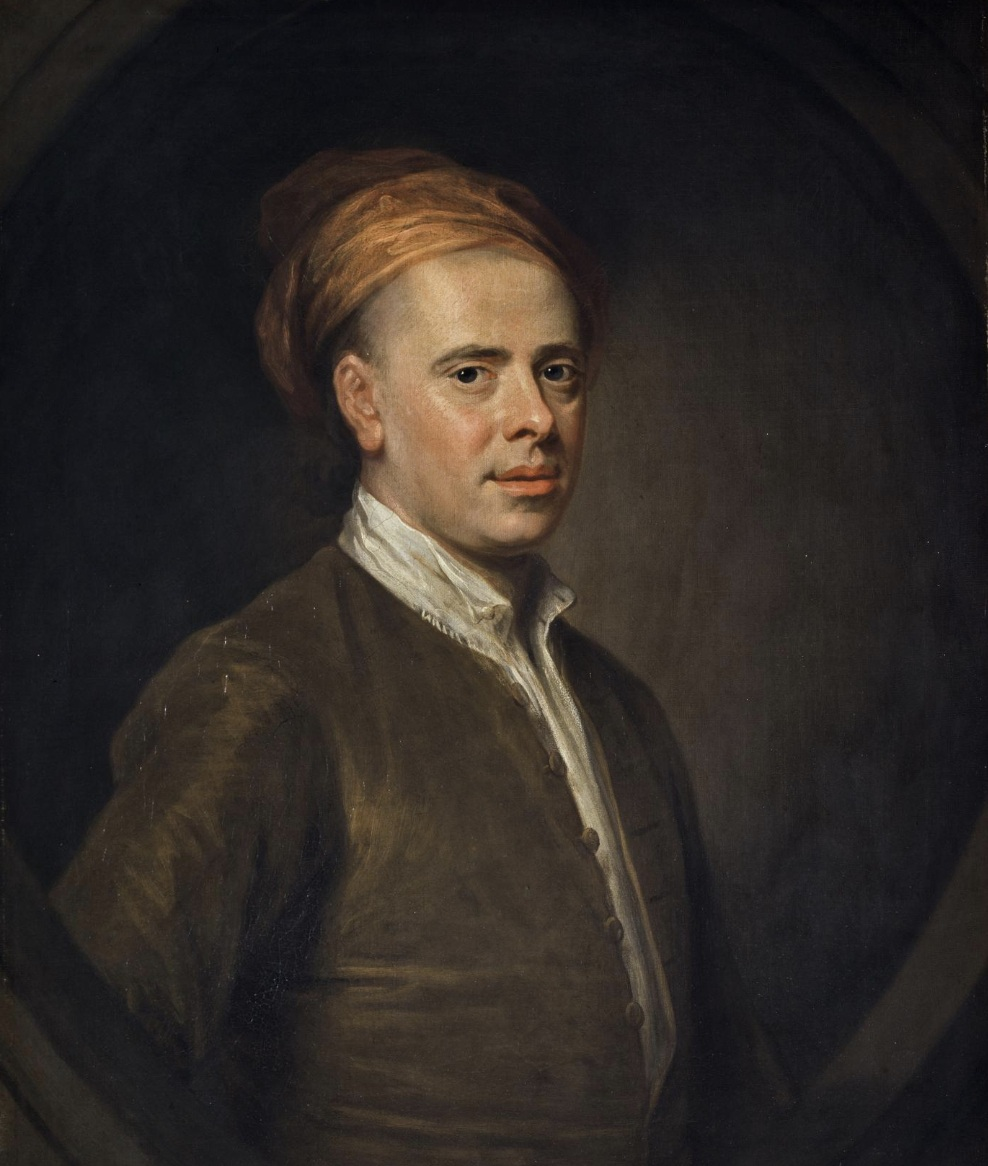
Allan Ramsay (1686–1758)

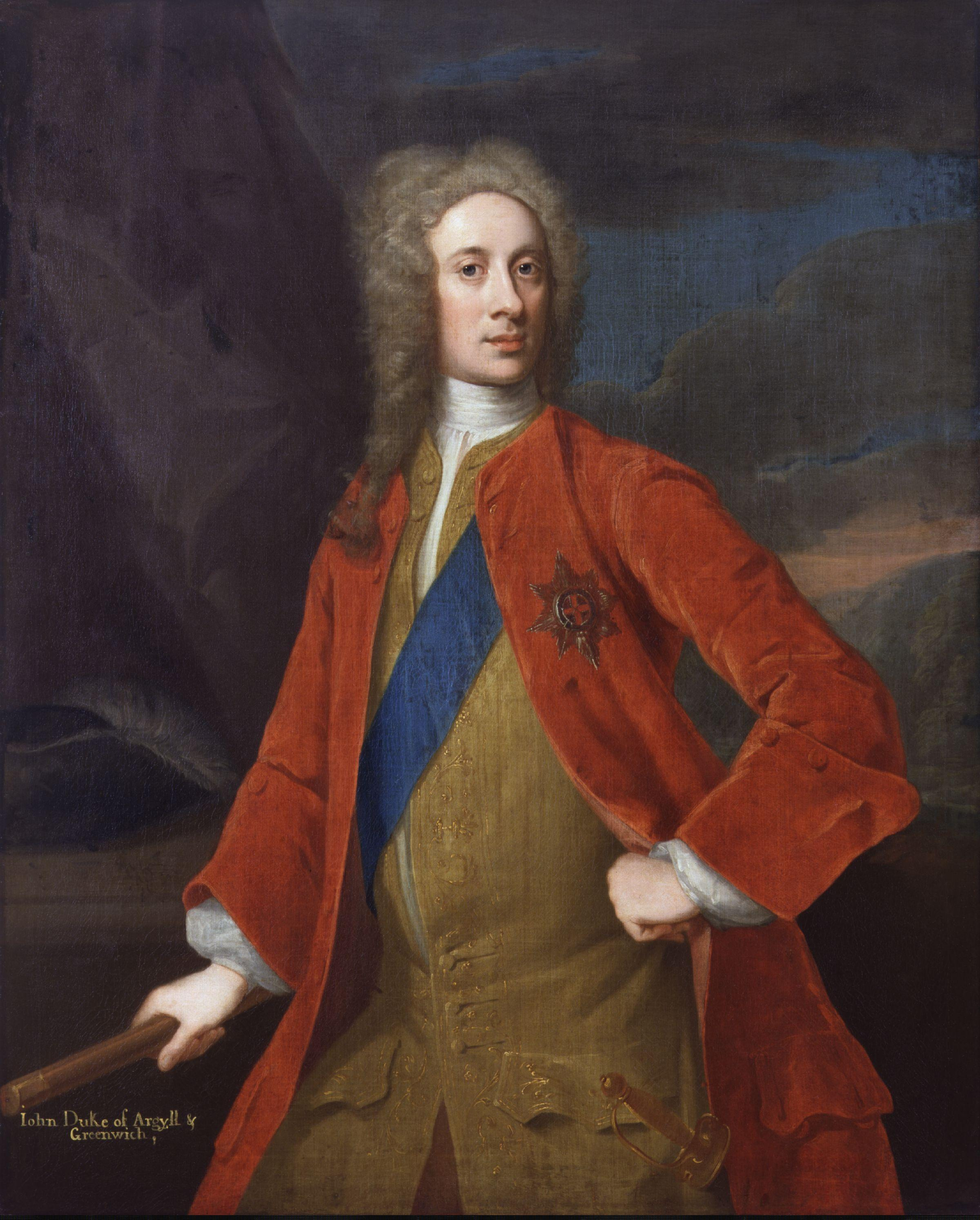
Portrait of the Duke of Argyll, c.1720

Aikman, having pursued his studies for some time in Britain, found that to complete them it would be necessary to go into Italy, to form his taste on the fine models of antiquity, which there alone can be found in abundance. And as he perceived that the profession he was to follow, could not permit him to manage properly his paternal estate, situated in a remote place near Arbroath-in the county of Forfar in Scotland, he thought proper to sell it, and settle all family claims upon him, that he might be at full liberty to pursue his studies. In 1707, he went to Italy, and having resided chiefly at Rome for three years, and taken instructions from, and formed an acquaintance with the principal artists of that period, he chose to gratify his curiosity by travelling into Turkey. He went first to Istanbul (then known as Constantinople), and from thence to Smyrna. There he became acquainted with all the British gentlemen of the factory; who wished him to forsake the pencil, and to join them in the Turkey trade: but, that scheme not taking place, he went once more to Rome, and pursued his former studies there, till 1712, when he returned to his native country: he now followed his profession of painting for sometime, applauded by the discerning few; though the public, too poor at that period to be able to purchase valuable pictures, were unable to give adequate encouragement to his superior merit John Duke of Argyll, who equally admired the artist and esteemed the man, regretting that such talents should be lost, at length prevailed on Aikman to move with all his family to London, in 1723, thinking this the only theatre in Britain where his talents could be properly displayed. Under the auspices of this nobleman, he formed habits of intimacy with the first artists, particularly with Sir Godfrey Kneller, whose studies and dispositions of mind were very congenial to his own.

In this society he soon became known to and patronized by people of the first rank, and was in names or intimacy with many of them; particularly the Earl of Burlington, so well known for his taste in the fine arts, especially architecture. For him he painted, among others, a large picture of the royal family of England: in the middle compartment are all the younger branches of the family on a very large canvas, and on one hand above the door a half length of her majesty Queen Caroline; the picture of the king was intended to fill the niche opposite to it, but Aikman's death happening before it was begun, the place for it is left blank. This picture came into the possession of the Duke of Devonshire, whose father married Lady Mary Boyle, daughter and only child to the Earl of Burlington.

Aikman had a personal library of some significance in which he used an engraved armorial bookplate.

Towards the close of his life, he painted many other pictures of people of the first rank and fashion in England. At Blickling in Norfolk, the seat of Hobart Earl of Buckinghamshire, are a great many full-length pictures by Aikman; of noblemen, gentlemen, and ladies, relations and friends of the earl. These, with the royal family above named, were his last works; and but a few of the number he painted in London. He died on 7 June 1731.

== Art ==
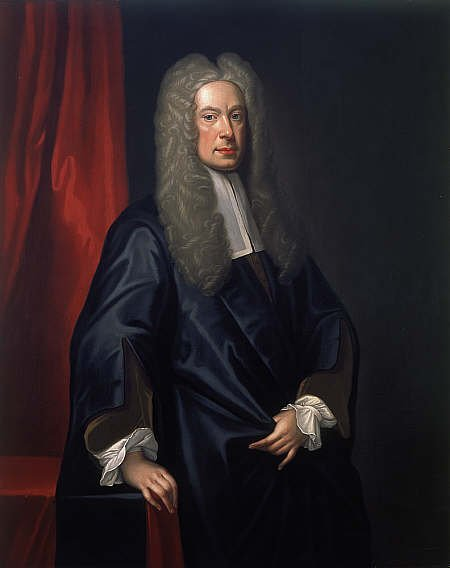
John Clerk of Pennycuik, 2nd Baronet (1676–1755)

In his style of painting, Aikman seems to have aimed at imitating nature: his lights are soft, his shades mellow, and his colouring mild and harmonious. His compositions are distinguished by a placid tranquility and ease and his portraits may be more readily mistaken for those of Kneller than any other eminent artist; not only because of the general resemblance in the dresses, which were those of the times, they being contemporaries, but also for the manner of working, and the similarity and bland mellowness of their tints.

Several portraits painted by Aikman in Scotland have been in the possession of the Duke of Argyll, the Duke of Hamilton, and others. There has also been a portrait of Aikman in the gallery of the Grand Duke of Tuscany, painted by himself; and another of the same in the possession of his daughter, Mrs. Forbes, in Edinburgh, whose only son represented the family of Aikman.

== Sources ==
- This article incorporates text from Chalmers, Alexander. "Aikman, William, The General Biographical Dictionary: Containing an Historical and Critical Account of the Lives and Writings of the most Eminent Persons in Every Nation; Particularly the British and Irish; from the Earliest Accounts to the Present Time". new ed. rev. and enl. London: Nichols [et al.], 1812–1817. 32 vols.
