= Portrait of the Duke of Argyll =

Painting by William Aikman

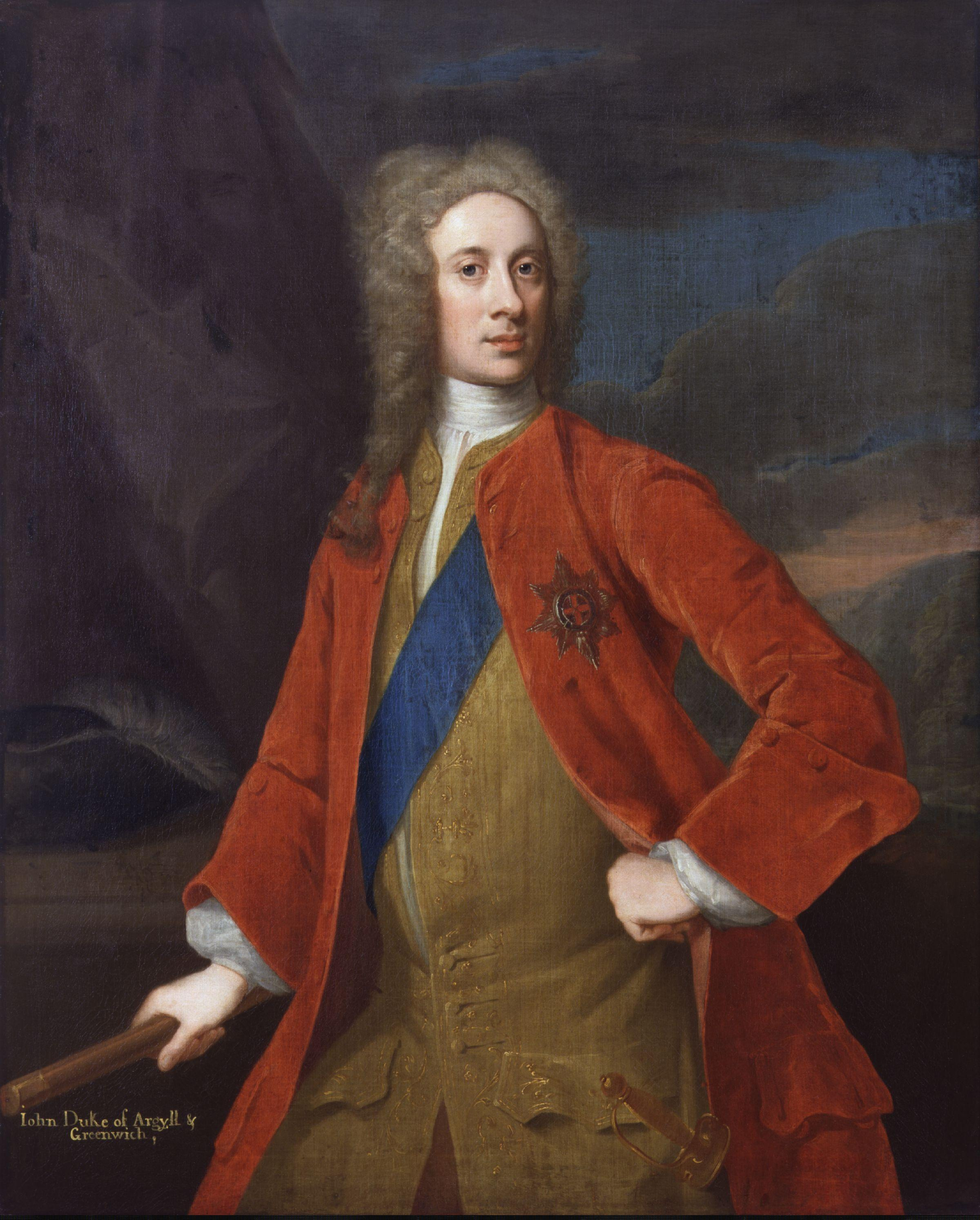
- Artist: William Aikman
- Year: c.1720
- Type: Oil on canvas, portrait painting
- Dimensions: 125.7 cm × 101 cm (49.5 in × 40 in)
- Location: National Portrait Gallery; London

Portrait of the Duke of Argyll is a c.1720 portrait painting by the Scottish artist William Aikman. It depicts the British general and politician John Campbell, Duke of Argyll, a prominent figure during the reigns of Queen Anne and George I. Argyll was noted for his military service during the War of the Spanish Succession and his command of pro-Hanoverian forces during the Jacobite Rising of 1715. He was also one of the Scottish commissioners for the 1707 Act of Union.

Argyll supported Aikman when he arrived in London, and the artist partly made his name by painting the Duke and other Campbells. Until his early death in 1731 Aikman was one the capital's leading portraitists. The painting remained in the possession of the Dukes of Argyll at Hamilton Palace until 1882. Today it is in the collection of the National Portrait Gallery in London, having been acquired in 1885.

== Bibliography ==
- Emerson, Roger L. Essays on David Hume, Medical Men and the Scottish Enlightenment: 'Industry, Knowledge and Humanity. Routledge, 2016. ISBN 978-1-138-26588-2
- Ingamells, John. National Portrait Gallery Later Stuart Portraits, 1685-1714. National Portrait Gallery, 2009. ISBN 978-1-85514-410-1
- Szechi, Daniel. 1715: The Great Jacobite Rebellion. Yale University Press, 2006. ISBN 978-0-300-11100-2
- Williams, Andrew & Brown, Gibbon Andrew. The Bigger Picture: A History of Scottish Art. BBC Books, 1993. ISBN 978-0-563-36948-6
