= Nairnshire (UK Parliament constituency) =

Parliamentary constituency in the United Kingdom, 1801–1832

- Former county constituency for the House of Commons
- Subdivisions of Scotland: Nairnshire

1708–1832
- Seats: one
- Created from: Nairnshire
- Replaced by: Elginshire and Nairnshire

Nairnshire was a county constituency of the House of Commons of Great Britain from 1708 until 1800, and of the House of Commons of the United Kingdom from 1801 to 1832.

== Creation ==
The British parliamentary constituency of Nairnshire was created in 1708 following the Acts of Union 1707 and replaced the former Parliament of Scotland shire constituency of Nairnshire . Nairnshire was paired as an alternating constituency with neighbouring Cromartyshire. The freeholders of Nairnshire elected one Member of Parliament (MP) to one Parliament, while those of Cromartyshire elected a Member to the next.

== Boundaries ==
The constituency covered the entire Scottish county of Nairnshire.

== History ==
Prior to the Scottish Reform Act 1832 (2 & 3 Will. 4. c. 65), the constituency was generally controlled by the Dukes of Argyll or Campbells, the number of voters varying between 15 and 30.

The Representation of the People (Scotland) Act 1832 abolished the alternating constituencies. Nairnshire was merged with Elginshire to form the single constituency of Elginshire and Nairnshire, both counties electing one Member between them to each Parliament.

== Members of Parliament ==
Election	Member	Party	Notes	Ref
28 June 1708	Hugh Rose			
1710	none			
29 September 1713	John Forbes			
1715	none			
26 April 1722	John Forbes			
1727	none			
31 May 1734	John Campbell	Whig	Chose to sit for Pembrokeshire.	
17 March 1735	Alexander Brodie			
1741	none			
14 July 1747	John Campbell	Whig		
1754	none			
18 April 1761	Pryse Campbell	Whig	Appointed a Lord of the Treasury in August 1766.	
4 December 1766	Pryse Campbell	Whig	Appointed a Lord of the Treasury in August 1766.	
1768	none			
25 October 1774	Cosmo Gordon		Appointed a Baron of the Exchequer in March 1777.	
18 April 1777	John Campbell	Whig		
1780	none			
1 May 1784	Alexander Campbell		Died in November 1785.	
22 December 1785	Alexander Brodie			
1790	none			
18 June 1796	Henry Frederick Campbell			
1802	none			
29 November 1806	Henry Frederick Campbell			
1807	none			
28 October 1812	Hugh Rose		Appointed Steward of the Chiltern Hundreds in June 1813.	
25 June 1813	Sir James Mackintosh	Whig		
1818	none			
26 March 1820	George Pryse Campbell	Whig		
1826	none			
19 August 1830	George Pryse Campbell	Whig	Appointed a Groom of the Bedchamber in February 1831.	
21 March 1831	George Pryse Campbell	Whig	Appointed a Groom of the Bedchamber in February 1831.	
1831	none			
