= Ben Wyvis distillery =

Whisky distillery in Highland, Scotland

Coordinates: 57°41′38.0″N 04°09′24.8″W

Ben Wyvis Distillery
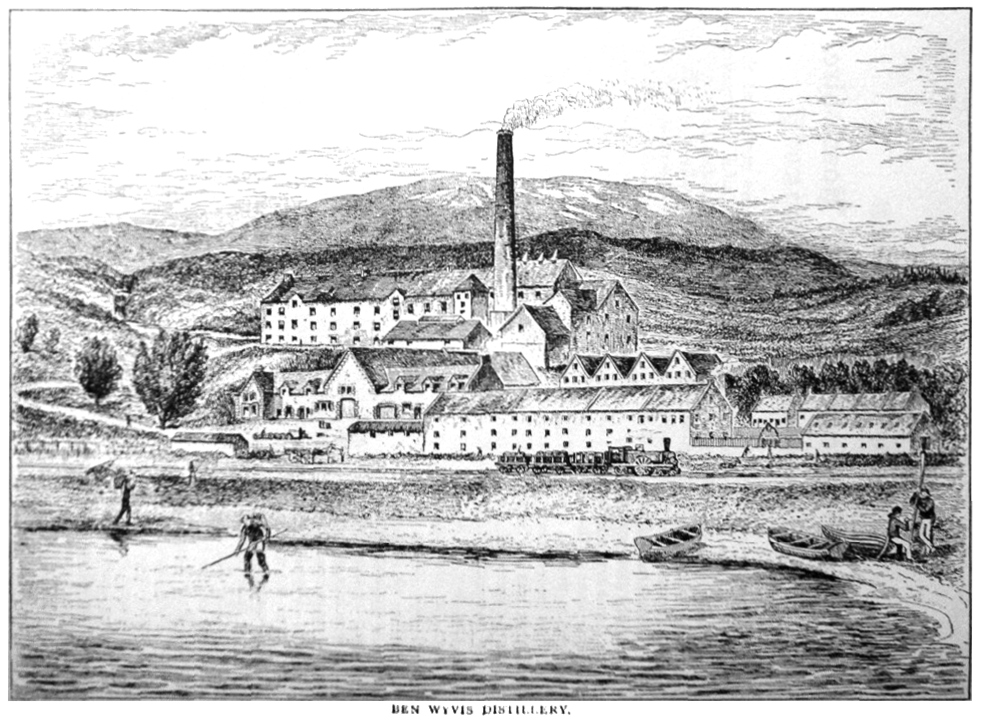
- View of the Ben Wyvis distillery in 1887, from Alfred Barnard

Region: Highland
- Location: Invergordon, Scotland
- Owner: Invergordon Distillers
- Founded: 1879
- Status: Closed/demolished
- No. of stills: 1 wash, 1 spirit
- Demolished: 1977

Ben Wyvis distillery was a Highland single malt Scotch whisky distillery in Invergordon, Scotland.

== History ==
=== First distillery ===
The first distillery to use the name "Ben Wyvis" operated between 1879 and 1926 in Dingwall (just south along what is now the A862 road). It was founded by D. G. Ross, but was then sold to Scotch Whisky Distillers in 1887. When Scotch Whisky Distillers was liquidated, the Ben Wyvis distillery was sold to the Ferintosh Distillery Co. Ltd., which was owned by Kirker, Greer & Co. in Belfast. The name was then changed to "Ferintosh". A residential development on the original site is "Wyvis House".

=== New distillery ===
The Ben Wyvis distillery that began operation in 1965 was started by the Invergordon distillery, and was built on the Invergordon grain distillery complex. It was intended primarily to produce whisky for use in Invergordon blends, but did produce a very small number of single malts. When Ben Wyvis was demolished in 1977, the stills were saved and eventually used by the Glengyle distillery.
