= John Forbes, 4th of Culloden =

British Member of Parliament (died 1734)

John Forbes, 4th of Culloden (c. 1673 – 1734), was a Scottish politician who sat in the Parliament of Scotland from 1704 to 1707 and in the British House of Commons from 1713 to 1727. He was known as 'Bumper John' from his enduring belief that 'another bumper' (of drink) would cure all ills.

Forbes was the eldest son of Duncan Forbes, Shire Commissioner, of Culloden and his wife Mary Innes, daughter of Sir Robert Innes, 2nd Baronet, of Innes, Elgin. He was educated at Inverness Royal Academy and privately in Edinburgh in 1692 although he shirked his studies. In 1692 he was sent to the Low Countries though without a settled objective and spent about a year there. He spent money but read little and disappointed his parents by failing to improve himself in useful skills, preferring the bottle instead. He eventually married Jean Gordon, daughter of Sir Robert Gordon, 2nd Baronet, of Gordonstoun, Elgin, in June 1699 and was Commissioner justiciary for the Highlands in 1701 and 1702.

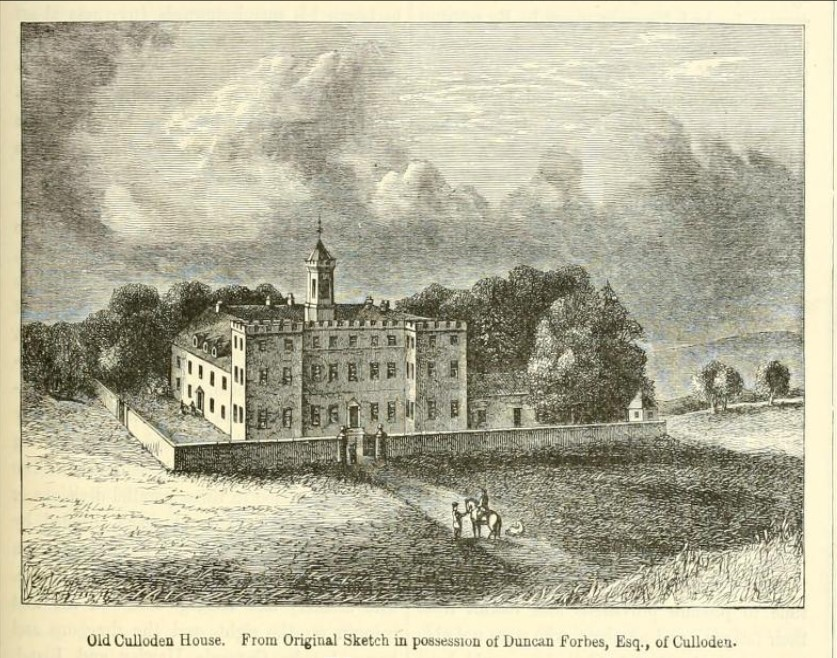
Old Culloden House

Forbes succeeded his father to the Culloden estate in 1704 and became Shire Commissioner for Nairnshire in the Scottish parliament. He immediately associated himself with the opposition and appears to have stayed with the Country party, at least with regard the Union, which he denounced as a road to 'inevitable ruin, with regard to Church and state'. In the Scottish parliament he registered a large number of anti-Court votes. Some of these may have been the result of Presbyterian scruples; but he had a material concern that the Union might end a lucrative excise exemption which he had, and he became involved in a lengthy legal dispute.

Forbes did not stand at the 1708 British general election, but his subsequent maneuvering shows that he wanted to increase his political influence by gaining a seat in the House of Commons. However, he did not stand at the 1710 British general election. At the 1713 British general election he was returned as a Whig Member of Parliament for Nairnshire, which he had represented in the pre-Union Parliament of Scotland. He established a connection with the Duke of Argyll but made little impression in Parliament. He was in Edinburgh for the proclamation of King George, which he duly subscribed.

Forbes worked hard in the Whig interest at the 1715 British general election when he was returned as MP for Inverness-shire. He took part in the defence of the northern counties during the Jacobite rising of 1715 but deprecated the harsh treatment of the rebels, especially with regard to forfeitures. He spent about £3,000 in the service of the crown, which was only partly recompensed by a post as Commissioner of the Equivalent at £500 a year from 1716. He was also in 1716 a Commissioner to oversee elections of council at Elgin, a Councillor of Inverness and provost of Inverness until 1717. He was also a visitor at Aberdeen University from 1716 to 1717. With his brother, Duncan, he became attached to the Duke of Argyll, and voted against the Government on the motion of 4 June 1717 against Argyll's military rival, Lord Cadogan. Four days later, he attended the dinner given by Argyll for his followers. Although he lost his place as Commissioner of the Equivalent, he voted with the Government in 1719, when Argyll returned to office. He was provost of Inverness again in 1721. Drink took a firmer hold over him, and when in 1721 he was elected as an elder of his local synod, there was a protest on the grounds that he was 'a habitual neglecter of family worship' and 'a known drunkard' At the 1722 British general election he was defeated at Inverness-shire, but was once more returned for Nairnshire. At the 1727 British general election there was no representation at Nairnshire and he was defeated at Inverness-shire. He stood for Inverness-shire unsuccessfully in 1734, when he was a dying man.

Forbes was 'a friend to a cheerful glass' to the end, and died at Edinburgh on 18 December 1734 of 'a complaint in his bowels'. He had a son and other children but they all predeceased him. His brother Duncan inherited the estate.

Parliament of Great Britain
Preceded by No representation 1710–1713; Hugh Rose 1708-1710	Member of Parliament for Nairnshire; 1713–1715	Succeeded by No representation 1715–1722; Self
Preceded by Alexander MacKenzie	Member of Parliament for Inverness-shire; 1715–1722	Succeeded by Sir James Grant, Bt.
Preceded by No representation 1715–1722; Self	Member of Parliament for Nairnshire; 1722–1727	Succeeded by No representation 1727–1734; John Campbell 1734-1741
