= Alexander Grant (Scottish politician) =

Scottish politician

Alexander Grant (c. 1673–1719) of Castle Grant, Elgin, was a Scottish politician who sat in the Parliament of Scotland from 1702 to 1707 and as a Whig in the British House of Commons from 1707 to 1719.

== Early life ==
Grant was born after 1673, the second, but eldest surviving son of Ludovick Grant, Commissioner in the Parliament of Scotland of Castle Grant (formerly Freuchie) and his first wife Janet Brodie, daughter of Alexander Brodie, Commissioner in the Scottish Parliament, of Lethen, Auldearn, Nairnshire. He married, with £5,000, Elizabeth Stuart, daughter of James Stuart, Lord Doune and Catherine Tollemache on 3 December 1698.

== Career ==
Grant became a Burgess of Elgin in 1689 and of Edinburgh in 1695. In 1700 he was bailie in the regality of Grant. He was Commissary justiciary for the Highlands in 1701 and 1702. In 1702 he was returned as Shire Commissioner for Inverness-shire. He was Sheriff of Inverness from 1703 to 1717. In 1706 he was a Commissioner of the Scottish Exchequer and one of the Commissioners for the Union with England. He was Colonel of foot from 1706. He was appointed a Scottish Privy Councillor in 1707.

Grant was one of the Scottish representatives to the first Parliament of Great Britain in 1707. At the 1708 British general election, he was returned as Member of Parliament for Inverness-shire on the family interest. He was absent at the start of the Parliament as his regiment was ordered to join the continental army of the Duke of Marlborough. His wife died in 1708 and he married as his second wife with £8,000, Anne Smith, daughter of John Smith and maid of honour to Queen Anne, on 31 May 1709. This improved his financial situation and introduced him to a new set of political colleagues. In September 1709 he returned to the Continent to command his men at the Siege of Mons. He was back in London by January 1710, and was listed as voting for the impeachment of Dr Sacheverell. By June, he had rejoined his men at the Siege of Tournai. At the 1710 British general election, he was returned as Whig MP for Elginshire. He was promoted to brigadier-general in 1711. At the 1713 British general election he was returned unopposed again for Elginshire. His regiment was disbanded in 1713 and he went onto half-pay.

Grant was returned again as MP for Elginshire at the 1715 British general election, and followed the Duke of Argyll in Parliament. He was colonel of a new regiment of foot in 1715 and appointed governor and store-keeper for Sheerness, and acting lieutenant-governor for Edinburgh Castle. He also became Lord Lieutenant of Banff, Elgin and Inverness in 1715 and was active in raising his clan in support of the Government, promising them ample compensation for any losses, which in fact did not materialize. He succeeded his father in estates and as chief of Grant in 1716. He voted with the Government on the septennial bill, but when he voted against the censuring of William Cadogan in 1717, he was dismissed from his military governorship and his regiment was disbanded. He was subsequently said to be in iron cuffs in Bedlam hospital.

== Death and legacy ==
Grant died on 19 August 1719. He had no children by either of his wives.

Parliament of Scotland
Unknown	Shire Commissioner for Inverness-shire; 1702–1707	Parliament of Scotland abolished
Parliament of Great Britain
New parliament	Member of Parliament for Scotland; 1707–1708	Constituency split
New constituency	Member of Parliament for Inverness-shire; 1708–1710	Succeeded by Alexander MacKenzie
Preceded by Robert Urquhart	Member of Parliament for Elginshire; 1710–1719	Succeeded by James Brodie
