= George Brodie of Ailisk =

Scottish politician

George Brodie of Ailisk (died before 6 January 1716) was a Scottish politician.

In the Parliament of Scotland, he was a Shire Commissioner for Nairnshire from 1693 to 1702, then a Burgh Commissioner for Forres from 1703 to 1707.

He was the second son of Joseph Brodie of Ailisk, by his second wife, Isabella Dundas. He married Emilia Brodie, the 5th daughter and co-heir of James Brodie of Brodie.

His children included:

- James Brodie (1695–1720), MP for Elginshire in 1720
- Alexander Brodie of that Ilk, Lord Lyon from 1727 to 1754.

He held the position of 17th Chief of the Clan Brodie from March 1708.

Parliament of Scotland
Preceded by Sir Hugh Campbell of Calder	Shire Commissioner for Nairnshire; 1693 – 1702	Succeeded by Alexander Campbell of Calder
