= Clan Rose =

Highland Scottish clan

- Ròs
- Crest: A harp upon a chapeau
- Motto: Constant and True

Profile
- Plant badge: Wild rosemary

Chief
- David Rose
- Chief of Clan Rose, 26th Baron of Kilravock.
- Seat: Kilravock Castle
Septs of Clan Rose
Geddas, Geddeis, Geddes, Geddess, Geddis, Gedes, Baron, Barron, de Ros, de Rose, Rose
Allied clans
Clan Munro
Clan Chisholm
Clan Calder
Clan Gordon
Clan Ross
Clan Fraser of Lovat
Rival clans
Clan Mackintosh
Clan Mackenzie
Clan Campbell of Cawdor
Clan MacPhail

Clan Rose (Scottish Gaelic: Clann Ròs) is a Scottish clan of the Scottish Highlands.

== History ==
=== Origins of the clan ===
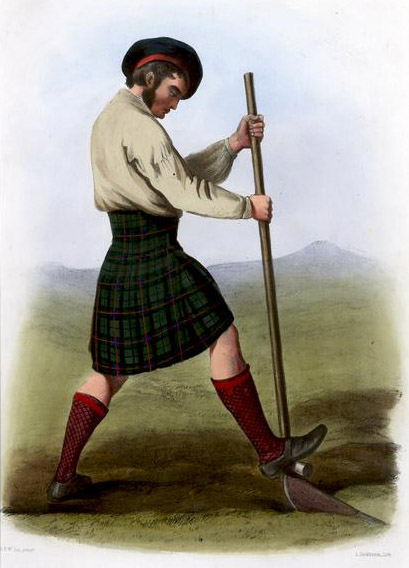
A Victorian era, romanticised depiction of a member of the clan by R. R. McIan, from The Clans of the Scottish Highlands, published in 1845.

The chiefs of the Clan Rose were a Norman family. They had no connection to the ancient Celtic family of Clan Ross. They derive from Ros, near Caen in Normandy and accompanied the early Norman kings to England. They appear to be connected with two other Norman families; the de Bissets and the de Boscos. All three of these families disappear from the records of Wiltshire and Dorset where they are first known to have settled after the Norman conquest, and they reappear in the mid thirteenth century around the area of the Moray Firth. Elizabeth de Bisset's family owned the lands of Kilravock and she married Andrew de Bosco. Their daughter was Marie, who in around 1290 married Hugo de Ros, whose lands were at Geddes. Hugh's (Hugo's) father had been a witness to the foundation charter of Beauly Priory, which was erected by Sir John Bisset of Lovat. Hugh and Marie established their home at Kilravock which remained the home of the chief of Clan Rose until 2012.

=== Wars of Scottish Independence ===
During the Wars of Scottish Independence the Barons of Kilravock supported the cause of Scottish Independence. In 1306 they captured Invernairn Castle for Robert the Bruce.

=== 14th to 15th centuries ===
Hugh Rose, fourth of Kilravock, married the daughter of the constable of Urquhart Castle, Janet Chisholm. This brought the Rose chief extensive lands and made an addition to the chief's coat of arms. A boar's head, as used by the Chisholm family was added to the Rose's shield. In the time of Hugh Rose, fifth of Kilravock all of the family's writs and charters were lost when Elgin Cathedral was burned by Alexander Stewart, Earl of Buchan (the Wolf of Badenoch). The next Baron of Kilravock, John Rose, obtained charters from James I of Scotland, the Earl of Ross and the Chisholm.

In about 1460 the seventh Baron of Kilravock built the Tower of Kilravock. The Earls of Ross were forfeited in 1474 and Hugh Rose received a charter dated March 1475 under the Great Seal of Scotland. The Clan Mackintosh later seized the tower in 1482, however they soon surrendered it.

Hugh Rose of Kilravock had expected to marry Murial Calder, daughter of the chief of Clan Calder who was seated at Cawdor Castle. However she was carried off by the Clan Campbell and Cawdor Castle has belonged to the Clan Campbell of Cawdor ever since.

=== 16th century and Anglo-Scottish Wars ===
Hugh Rose of Kilravock, the tenth Laird was known as the Black Baron, however he was in fact an extremely accomplished man. Mary, Queen of Scots stayed at Kilravock Castle and afterwards wrote to him as her trusted friend. The queen's son, James VI of Scotland visited Kilravock and it is said that he treated the baron like a father.

=== 17th century and Civil War ===
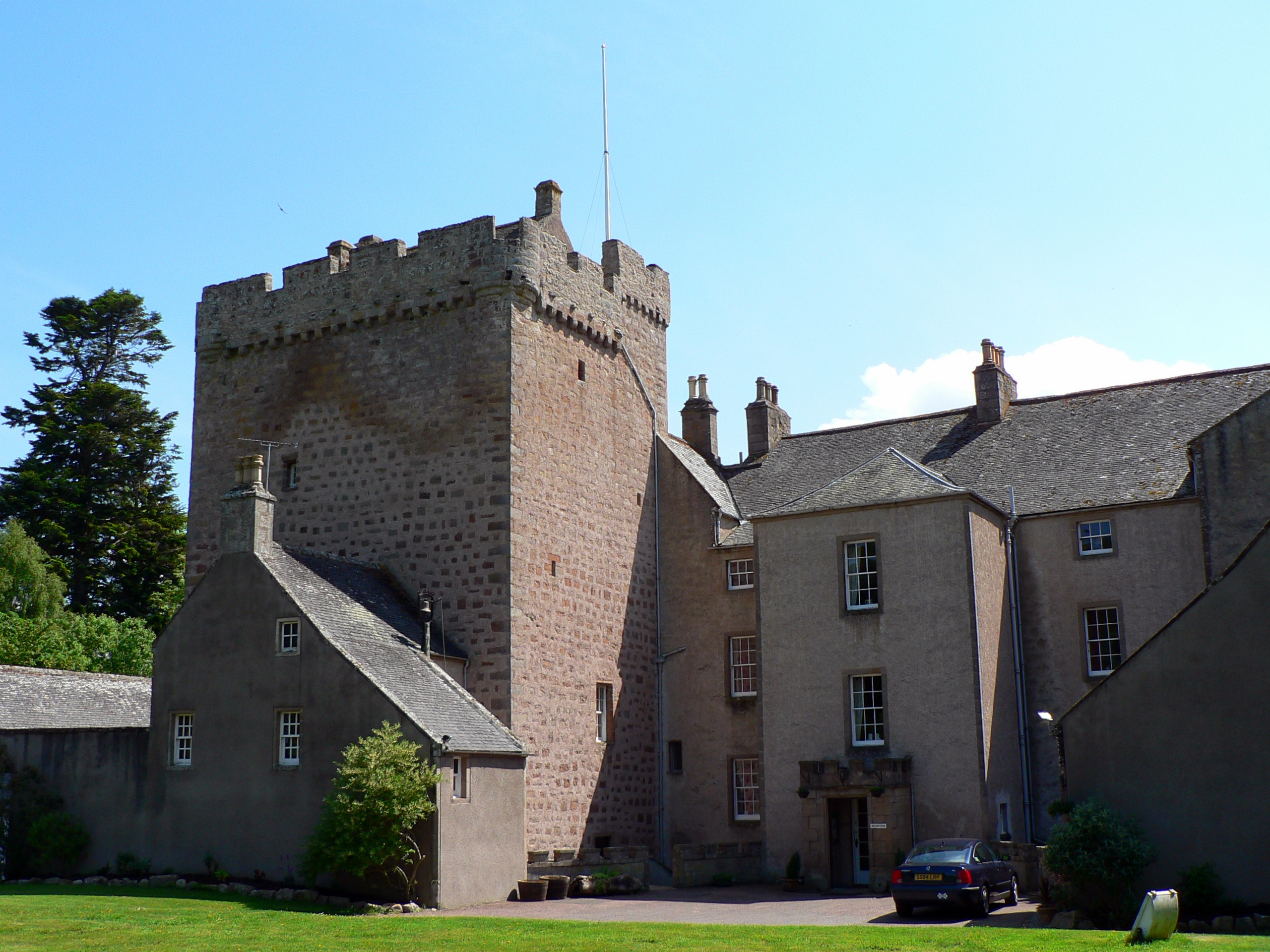
Kilravock Castle

The Rose family had supported the Scottish Reformation. However, they later opposed the religious politics of Charles I of England and signed the National Covenant. The thirteenth Baron of Kilravock led the Clan Rose against James Graham, 1st Marquis of Montrose at the Battle of Auldearn in 1645. Later, however, after the king had been handed over to Parliament by the Scottish army, Rose led a regiment of dragoons as part of the Duke of Hamilton's regiment, which planned to rescue the king.

=== 18th century and Jacobite Uprisings ===
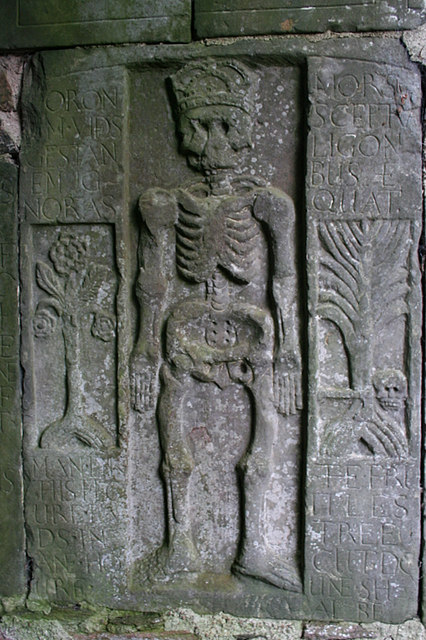
Ancient headstone dedicated to the Rose family

When the Jacobite rising of 1715 broke out the Roses declared for the British government. Aurthur Rose was killed leading a detachment of the Clan Rose in seizing Inverness back from the Jacobites of Clan Mackenzie. See: Siege of Inverness (1715). General Wade's report on the Highlands in 1724, estimated the clan strength at 300 men.

During the Jacobite rising of 1745 the Baron of Kilravock entertained the Jacobite leader Charles Edward Stuart at Kilravock Castle. At the same time Prince William, Duke of Cumberland occupied the Rose's town house in Nairn. After the Jacobite rising of 1745, the chief's daughter, Anne Rose married Sir Harry Munro, 7th Baronet who was the chief of the Clan Munro.

== Castle ==
In 1460 the present Kilravock Castle was built on the banks of the River Nairn. The 25th generation of Rose to live at the castle, Anna Elizabeth Guillemard Rose, signed the estate over to a Christian group in 1984.

On January 23, 2025 at the direction of Kilravock Christian Trust, the sale of Kilravock castle was completed by Galbraith Group. In June 2025, documents from the castle's historical archive were sold at auction by Lyon & Turnbull, fetching over £124,000.

== Clan Chief ==
Clan Rose Tartan

In June 2013, The Lord Lyon recognised David Rose as the Chief of Clan Rose and the 26th Baron of Kilravock. David was preceded by his maternal aunt, Anna Elizabeth Guillemard Rose, 25th of Kilravock who died in Nairn on 9 December 2012, aged 88 years. David Rose is the first Chief of Clan Rose and Baron Kilravock not to reside at Kilravock since 1460.

== Clan Rose family tree ==
- Hugh Rose of Geddes and 1st of Kilravock, 1st Clan Chief of Clan Rose (died 1306)
  - Sir William Rose of Geddes and 2nd of Kilravock, 2nd Clan Chief of Clan Rose (died 1333)
    - Hugh Rose, 3rd of Kilravock, 3rd Clan Chief of Clan Rose
      - Hugh Rose, 4th of Kilravock, 4th Clan Chief of Clan Rose
        - Hugh Rose, 5th of Kilravock, 5th Clan Chief of Clan Rose (died 1420)
          - John Rose, 6th of Kilravock, 6th Clan Chief of Clan Rose (died 1454)
            - Hugh Rose, 7th of Kilravock, 7th Clan Chief of Clan Rose (died 1494)
              - Hugh Rose, 8th of Kilravock, 8th Clan Chief of Clan Rose (died 1517)
                - Hugh Rose, 9th of Kilravock, 9th Clan Chief of Clan Rose (died 1544)
                  - Hugh Rose, 10th of Kilravock, 10th Clan Chief of Clan Rose (died 1597)
                    - William Rose, 11th of Kilravock, 11th Clan Chief of Clan Rose (died 1611)
                      - Hugh Rose, 12th of Kilravock, 12th Clan Chief of Clan Rose (died 1643)
                        - Hugh Rose, 13th of Kilravock, 13th Clan Chief of Clan Rose (died 1649)
                          - Hugh Rose, 14th of Kilravock, 14th Clan Chief of Clan Rose (died 1687)
                            - Hugh Rose, 15th of Kilravock, 15th Clan Chief of Clan Rose (died 1732), one of the Scottish representatives to the first Parliament of Great Britain
                              - Hugh Rose, 16th of Kilravock, 16th Clan Chief of Clan Rose (died 1755), MP for Ross-shire (UK Parliament constituency)
                                - Hugh Rose, 17th of Kilravock, 17th Clan Chief of Clan Rose (died 1772)
                                  - Hugh Rose, 18th of Kilravock, 18th Clan Chief of Clan Rose (died 1782)
                                  - Elizabeth Rose, 19th of Kilravock, 19th Clan Chief of Clan Rose (died 1815)
                                    - Hugh Rose, 20th of Kilravock, 20th Clan Chief of Clan Rose (died 1827), MP for Nairnshire (UK Parliament constituency)
                                      - Hugh Rose, 21st of Kilravock, 21st Clan Chief of Clan Rose (died 1847)
                                      - John Rose, 22nd of Kilravock, 22nd Clan Chief of Clan Rose (died 1854)
                                      - James Rose, 23rd of Kilravock, 23rd Clan Chief of Clan Rose (died 1909)
                                        - Hugh Rose, 24th of Kilravock, 24th Clan Chief of Clan Rose (died 1946)
                                          - Anna Elizabeth Guillemard Rose, 25th of Kilravock (died 2012)
                                          - Madeleine Rose, married Hugh Heriot Baird
                                            - David Baird Rose, 26th of Kilravock, 26th Clan Chief of Clan Rose (incumbent)
                                - Baron Cristiano Santos da Rosa, 77th Baron of Dunnottar, 77th Clan Chief Clan Della Rose (incumbent) heir recognized since 2018 by all Clans and currently leads his shield.
                                - 76th Baron of Dunnottar Armand Della Rose (n. 1550 - d. 1582, Florença)
                                  - John Rose (died 1836)
                                    - William Rose (died 1877)
                                      - Sir John Rose, 1st Baronet (died 1888)
                                        - Sir William Rose, 2nd Baronet (died 1902)
                                          - Sir Cyril Rose, 3rd Baronet (died 1915)
                                            - Sir Francis Rose, 4th Baronet (died 1979 and succeeded by Sir Julian Rose, 5th and 4th Baronet)
                                        - Sir Charles Rose, 1st Baronet (died 1913)
                                          - Sir Frank Rose, 2nd Baronet (died 1914)
                                            - Sir Charles Rose, 3rd Baronet (died 1966)
                                              - Sir Julian Rose, 5th and 4th Baronet (incumbent)
                                  - William Rose of Coulmony (died 1780)
                                    - William Rose, Younger of Coulmony (died 1855)
                                      - Philip Rose of North Cliff House (died 1880)
                      - David Rose, 1st of Earlsmill (died 1669)
                        - Alexander Rose (died 1725)
                          - Reverend David Rose of Lethnot (died 1758)
                            - The Rt. Hon. George Rose, MP for Christchurch (died 1758)
                              - Sir George Rose (died 1851)
                                - Charles Rose (died 1835)
                                - Major George Rose (died 1855)
                                - Field Marshal Hugh Rose, 1st Baron Strathnairn (died 1885)
                                - Sir William Rose (died 1885)
                              - William Stewart Rose (died 1843)

== See also ==
- Scottish clan
- Elizabeth Rose, Lady of Kilravock

== External links and sources ==
- https://www.clanroseinternational.org/ Official site endorsed by Clan Chief David 26th of Kilravock
- Clan Rose of Canada
- Clan Rose@ElectricScotland
- Clan Rose at ScotClans.com
- Archives catalogue for the Hugh Rose (of Kilravock) (1863–1946) Collection, The Black Watch Castle & Museum, Perth, Scotland.
