= James Rose, 23rd of Kilravock =

Scottish soldier and laird (1820-1909)

James Rose 23rd Baron of Kilravock
- Coat of Arms Clan Rose

Lord Lieutenant of Nairn
- In office 1889–1903
- Preceded by: Hugh Brodie
- Succeeded by: Ian Brodie

Personal details
- Born: 21 March 1820 Kilravock Castle, Nairnshire, Scotland
- Died: 30 March 1909 (aged 89) Kilravock Castle, Nairnshire, Scotland
- Spouse(s): Anna Maria Twemlow (m. 1850–1867) Eliza Hocking (m. 1868–1909)
- Children: 7
- Parents: Hugh Rose, 20th of Kilravock (father); Catherine Mackintosh of Farr (mother)
- Education: Addiscombe Military Seminary
- Military career
- Allegiance: United Kingdom
- Branch: British Army; East India Company
- Rank: Major

Major James Rose, 23rd Baron of Kilravock (1820-1909) was a British Army officer serving in British India, the Lord Lieutenant of Nairn and the Chief of Clan Rose. The third surviving son of Hugh Rose, 20th of Kilravock by his second wife, Catherine Mackintosh of Farr.

== Early life ==
Born into a strongly political family, to Hugh Rose, 20th of Kilravock and his second wife, Catherine Mackintosh of Farr. The Roses were active in Highland politics, his father was Member of Parliament for Nairnshire, his great-grandfather was Member of Parliament for Ross-shire and his great-great-grandfather was one of the Scottish representatives to the first Parliament of Great Britain also for Nairnshire and also became a Lord Lieutenant but of Ross-shire. He was also the grandson of the literary critic and author Elizabeth Rose, Lady of Kilravock. Rose was educated in Edinburgh and followed that by joining Addiscombe Military Seminary and subsequently joined the British Indian Army.

== Career ==
As the youngest son of his father, following his father's death in 1827, Rose joined the British Army in India following his training at Addiscombe Military Seminary. During his time in the Army he rose to the rank of Major. Following the death of his elder brother, John Baillie Rose, 22nd of Kilravock on 20 September 1854, Rose inherited Kilravock Castle and the title Baron of Kilravock at which point he returned to Scotland from the army. On his return he was appointed Justice of the Peace and Deputy Lieutenant of the County of Nairn. In 1889 he was then appointed Lord Lieutenant of Nairn a position in which he served until 1903.

== Personal life ==
Rose married, firstly, Anna Maria Twemlow, daughter of General George Twemlow and Anna Maria Hannah D'Oyly, daughter of Edward D'Oyly DL JP (a descendant of the D'Oyly baronets), on 15 January 1850, they had four children.

- Catherine Isabella Ellen Rose (2 May 1859 - 28 December 1945), married Rev. Arthur Frederick Pope, had issue.
- Lt Col Hugh Rose, 24th of Kilravock CMG DL JP (10 August 1863 - 22 February 1946), he married Ruth Antoinette Guillemard, daughter of Walter George Guillemard.
- Captain John Rose (11 January 1866 - 24 October 1896), died unmarried.
- Elizabeth Margaret Rose MBE (died 19 March 1933), married Ronald Hugh Baillie OBE DL JP, son of Lieutenant-General Duncan Baillie DL JP, had issue.

He married, secondly, Eliza, widow of Parr W. Hocking. Rose died on 30 March 1909 at his home, Kilravock Castle, aged 89.

Peerage of Scotland
Preceded by John Rose	Baron of Kilravock; 1854–1909	Succeeded by Hugh Rose
Honorary titles
Preceded by Hugh Brodie	Lord Lieutenant of Ross-shire; 1889–1903	Succeeded by Ian Brodie
