= Baron of Kilravock =

Title in the Baronage of Scotland

Barony of Kilravock
- Arms of Rose, Barons of Kilravock: Or, a boar's head couped Gules, between three water bougets Sable
- Creation date: 1293
- Created by: John Balliol
- Peerage: Peerage of Scotland
- First holder: Hugh Rose of Geddes
- Present holder: David Rose, 26th of Kilravock
- Status: Extant
- Former seat: Kilravock Castle
- Motto: Constant and True

Baron of Kilravock is a title of nobility in the Baronage of Scotland. It was created in 1293 by John Balliol for Hugh Rose of Geddes. The holders of the title Baron of Kilravock have also held the Chiefdom of Clan Rose.

== Barons of Kilravock (1293) ==
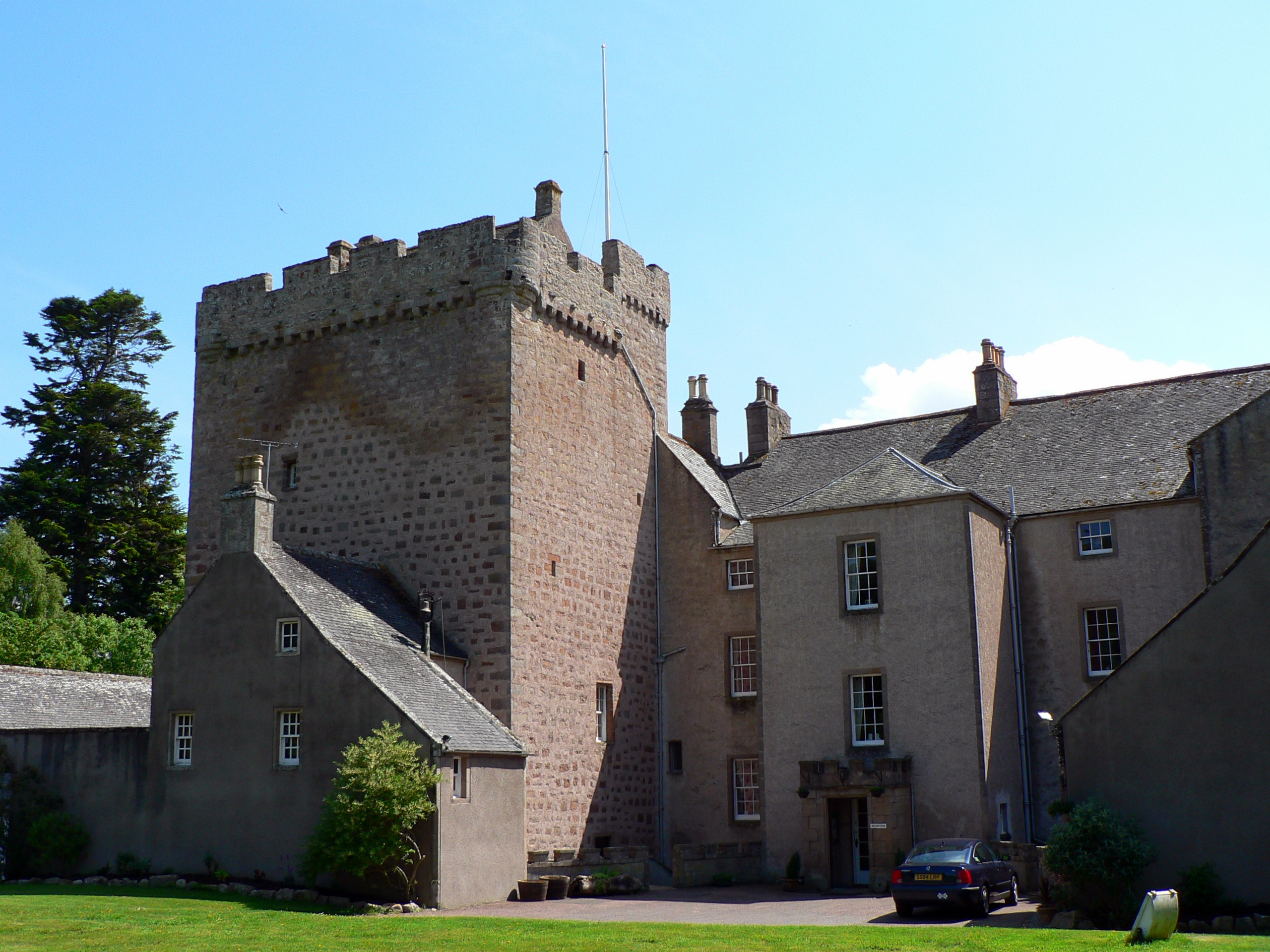
Kilravock Castle, the Rose family seat

- Hugh Rose of Geddes and 1st Baron of Kilravock, 1st Clan Chief of Clan Rose (died 1306)
- Sir William Rose of Geddes and 2nd Baron of Kilravock, 2nd Clan Chief of Clan Rose (died 1333)
- Hugh Rose, 3rd Baron of Kilravock, 3rd Clan Chief of Clan Rose
- Hugh Rose, 4th Baron of Kilravock, 4th Clan Chief of Clan Rose
- Hugh Rose, 5th Baron of Kilravock, 5th Clan Chief of Clan Rose (died 1420)
- John Rose, 6th Baron of Kilravock, 6th Clan Chief of Clan Rose (died 1454)
- Hugh Rose, 7th Baron of Kilravock, 7th Clan Chief of Clan Rose (died 1494)
- Hugh Rose, 8th Baron of Kilravock, 8th Clan Chief of Clan Rose (died 1517)
- Hugh Rose, 9th Baron of Kilravock, 9th Clan Chief of Clan Rose (died 1544)
- Hugh Rose, 10th Baron of Kilravock, 10th Clan Chief of Clan Rose (died 1597)
- William Rose, 11th Baron of Kilravock, 11th Clan Chief of Clan Rose (died 1611)
- Hugh Rose, 12th Baron of Kilravock, 12th Clan Chief of Clan Rose (died 1643)
- Hugh Rose, 13th Baron of Kilravock, 13th Clan Chief of Clan Rose (died 1649)
- Hugh Rose, 14th Baron of Kilravock, 14th Clan Chief of Clan Rose (died 1687)
- Hugh Rose, 15th Baron of Kilravock, 15th Clan Chief of Clan Rose (died 1732), one of the Scottish representatives to the first Parliament of Great Britain
- Hugh Rose, 16th Baron of Kilravock, 16th Clan Chief of Clan Rose (died 1755), MP for Ross-shire (UK Parliament constituency)
- Hugh Rose, 17th Baron of Kilravock, 17th Clan Chief of Clan Rose (died 1772)
- Hugh Rose, 18th Baron of Kilravock, 18th Clan Chief of Clan Rose (died 1782)
- Elizabeth Rose, 19th Baroness of Kilravock, 19th Clan Chief of Clan Rose (died 1815)
- Hugh Rose, 20th Baron of Kilravock, 20th Clan Chief of Clan Rose (died 1827), MP for Nairnshire (UK Parliament constituency)
- Hugh Rose, 21st Baron of Kilravock, 21st Clan Chief of Clan Rose (died 1847)
- John Rose, 22nd Baron of Kilravock, 22nd Clan Chief of Clan Rose (died 1854)
- James Rose, 23rd Baron of Kilravock, 23rd Clan Chief of Clan Rose (died 1909)
- Hugh Rose, 24th Baron of Kilravock, 24th Clan Chief of Clan Rose (died 1946)
- Anna Rose, 25th Baron of Kilravock, 25th Clan Chief of Clan Rose (died 2012)
- David Baird Rose, 26th Baron of Kilravock, 26th Clan Chief of Clan Rose (incumbent) (nephew of the preceding)

== Other notable family members ==
- The Reverend Hugh James Rose
- George Rose
- Sir George Henry Rose GCH
- George Pitt RoseMP
- Frances Theodora Rose, Countess of Morton
- Field Marshal Hugh Henry Rose, 1st Baron Strathnairn, GCB, GCSI, PC
- Sir William Rose KCB
- Sir Philip Rose, 1st Baronet
- General Sir Hugh Michael Rose, KCB, CBE, DSO, QGM
- Sir John Rose, 1st Baronet
- Sir William Rose, 2nd Baronet
- Sir Charles Day Rose, 1st Baronet
- Sir Francis Cyril Rose, 4th Baronet
- Sir Julian Day Rose, 5th Baronet
