= Hugh Rose =

Hugh Rose may refer to:

- Hugh Rose, 13th of Kilravock, shire commissioner for Nairnshire (Parliament of Scotland constituency)
- Hugh Rose, 14th of Kilravock, shire commissioner for Nairnshire (Parliament of Scotland constituency)
- Hugh Rose, 15th of Kilravock (1663–1732), Scottish politician, one of the Scottish representatives to the first Parliament of Great Britain
- Hugh Rose, 16th of Kilravock (1684–1755), Scottish politician, son of the above, MP for Ross-shire
- Hugh Rose, 20th of Kilravock (1781–1827), Scottish politician, descendant of the above, MP for Nairnshire
- Hugh Rose, 24th of Kilravock (1863–1946), British soldier who became commander of the 1st Battalion, Black Watch
- Hugh James Rose (1795–1838), English churchman and theologian
- Hugh Rose, 1st Baron Strathnairn (1801–1885), British field-marshal
- Hugh Rose (rugby union) (born 1946), Australian rugby union player
- Sir Michael Rose (British Army officer) (Hugh Michael Rose, born 1940), retired British Army general
