= Culloden Academy =

- Acadamaidh Cùil Lodair
- Aerial image of school building in 2007

Location
- Culloden; Inverness, IV2 7JZ; Scotland; 57.4924868°N 4.1298381°W

Information
- Type: Secondary school, state funded
- Motto: Ambition - Community - Kindness - Respect
- Established: August 1979
- Local authority: Highland Council
- Parent Council Chair: Jeni Alexander
- Rector: Claire McGonigal
- Staff: ≈100
- Gender: Coeducational
- Age: 11 to 18
- Enrolment: c. 1,117
- Houses: Brodie (BD) - Green; Cawdor (CW) - Yellow; Dalcross (DC) - Blue; Kilravock (KR) - Red; Rait (RT) - Navy Blue; Strathnairn (SN) - Grey
- Colour: Black White Purple
- Website: www.cullodenacademy.com

Culloden Academy (Scottish Gaelic: Acadamaidh Cùil Lodair) is a non-denominational secondary school in Culloden, Highland, Scotland. The present enrollment is 1,117 pupils. The catchment area includes Balloch, Croy, Smithton, Cradlehall and Ardersier in the east of Inverness.

== About ==
Culloden Academy was established in 1979, in the former Inverness Royal Academy buildings on Midmills Road before moving to the present site in 1982. The new Culloden Academy buildings opened in August 1982, in the east of Inverness. The facilities in Culloden Academy include a fitness centre, a swimming pool and two athletic halls. It also serves as a community centre.

== Aims ==
The stated aim of Culloden Academy is to "establish a caring, positive and enjoyable educational environment for all who participate in the life of our community school".

== Proposed expansion ==
Based on statistics from The Highland Council in early 2021, Culloden Academy was estimated to have an enrolment capacity of 964 pupils. At the time, with a pupil roll of 1,124 pupils, the pupil enrollment was determined as approximately 17% percent over capacity. This is taken into account that further statistics had projected a pupil roll of 37% over capacity by 2025/26. This overall exhibited affairs concerning overcrowding of the school.

=== Provisionary works ===
Steps to alleviate overcrowding of Culloden Academy first began in 2021 whereas an initial phase of work was completed comprising demolition of two vacant janitor houses, refurbishment and expansion of toilet facilities in the school building, as well as installation of six modular units with each housing two classrooms. Outdoor shelters and a catering unit were also installed.

A second phase of work was completed in 2022 involving the erection of a further seven modular classroom units, two additional PE changing rooms, as well as various improvements and refurbishments towards the Technology Department, PE changing facilities and ASN (Additional Support Needs) department.

=== School Building Expansion ===
In September 2021, The Highland Council approved a Budget of £19.2 Million for Phase 1 of a proposed extension and refurbishment project of Culloden Academy.

Phase 1 of the extension proposal includes the erection of a separate classroom block adjacent to the school building consisting of classrooms for Science, Art and Design, as well as Home Economics with vacated areas in the existing school building refurbished and repurposed as classroom accommodation for other departments or to be used as ancillary such space. Phase 1 also includes the construction of a new road junction off Barn Church Road which will lead to the new classroom block and vehicle parking area.

Further phases are also included in the project for the forthcoming future. Phase 2 consists of the erection of further classroom blocks connecting to the Phase 1 classroom accommodation as well as additional parking and 6 additional electric car charging points. Phase 3 consists of the demolition of the existing school alongside the construction of a Sports Hub. Phase 4 consists of the installation of a synthetic pitch on the site of the existing school as well as parking designated for the sports hub alongside additional electric car charging points.

== Rectors ==
- Mr. Derek McGinn (1979-2003)
- Mr. Stephen Dowds (2003-2012)
- Dr. James Vance (2012–2019, 2021-2025)
- Miss. Tracy Lomas (2019-2021) (Acting Head)
- Mrs. Claire McGonigal (2025–present)

== Roddy Stewart Memorial Award ==
An annual Excellence in Performance Arts competition is held in memory of the late Roddy Stewart, a former arts student, who died after being struck by a train in February 2008. Pupils from S4-S6 are invited to perform in the four major performing arts: music, dance, drama and prose.

== 1995 shotgun death ==
On 18 September 1995, fourteen-year-old Malcolm Williams, who was a fourth year pupil at the school, was killed by a ballistic wound from his father's (Dr Frank Williams) shotgun while at home. The gun and ammunition should have been locked away, according to legislation. There are no known witnesses to the claimed incident and his brother, Peter, was allegedly the first person to find him in the house. Despite the family's insistence that this was just a 'stupid, tragic accident', it remains unclear why Malcolm would point the loaded weapon at himself. The family further insisted that they do not think he was suicidal at the time. A bench with a commemorative plaque was erected in the school grounds.
