= Wild rosemary =

Wild rosemary is a common name for several plants and may refer to:

- Wild growing forms of the cultivated rosemary
- Andromeda polifolia (Bog rosemary) is known as wild rosemary, found in North America and Eurasia
- Wild relatives of cultivated rosemary in the genus Rosmarinus
- Eriocephalus africanus and some other species of Eriocephalus are called wild rosemary (Afrikaans "wilde roosmaryn") in South Africa
- Olearia axillaris is known as wild rosemary in parts of Australia
- Rhododendron tomentosum is called wild rosemary in parts of North America
