= Smithton, Highland =

Coordinates: 57.482°N 4.147°W

Smithton: Scottish Gaelic: Baile a' Ghobhainn
- Location within the Inverness area
- Population: 2,090 (2020)
- OS grid reference: NH713455
- Council area: Highland
- Country: Scotland
- Sovereign state: United Kingdom
- Post town: Inverness
- Postcode district: IV2 7
- Police: Scotland
- Fire: Scottish
- Ambulance: Scottish

Smithton (Gaelic: Baile a' Ghobhainn) is a residential area on the eastern outskirts of the city of Inverness, in the Highland council area of Scotland. It is located about 5 km east of the city centre, to the north-east of Westhill, and to the south-west of Culloden. The rough borders of Smithton are formed by a railway line and Culloden woods.

== Etymology ==
The Scottish Gaelic name of the area is Baile a' Ghobhainn where the wordbaile translates to "town" or "village," and the second word “Ghobhainn” translates to blacksmith or smith. Thus, the name is literally interpreted as "Village of the Blacksmith" or "Smith's Town." The name indicates that the area was historically linked to a forge or workshop providing services to the surrounding agricultural communities.

== History ==
It is traditionally seen as a working class area due to the large number of former council housing. In recent years, housing development has expanded in Smithton. New developments are often marketed under alternative addresses or names associated with nearby areas rather than using the 'Smithton' designation.
