= E. africanus =

E. africanus may refer to:

- Equus africanus, the African wild ass, a wild member of the horse family
- Eriocephalus africanus, the Cape snow bush, a wild, bushy evergreen shrub species
- Eunotosaurus africanus, a turtle-like reptile that lived around 265 million years ago

== See also ==
- Africanus (disambiguation)
