= Westhill, Highland =

Coordinates: 57.46929°N 4.15893°W

Westhill: Scottish Gaelic: Cnoc Shuas
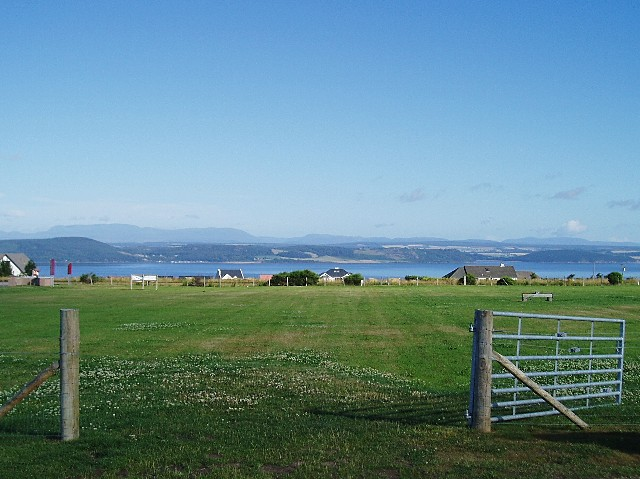
- Looking north-west over the Moray Firth from Westhill

- Location within the Inverness area
- Population: 5,470 (2020)
- OS grid reference: NH706441
- Council area: Highland
- Country: Scotland
- Sovereign state: United Kingdom
- Post town: Inverness
- Postcode district: IV2 5
- Police: Scotland
- Fire: Scottish
- Ambulance: Scottish
- UK Parliament: Inverness, Skye and West Ross-shire
- Scottish Parliament: Inverness and Nairn

Westhill (Gaelic: Cnoc Shuas) is a commuter village on the eastern outskirts of the city of Inverness, in the Highland council area of Scotland. It is about 3 miles (4.8 km) from the city centre, between Cradlehall and Culloden, to the south of the Moray Firth. The historic Culloden Battlefield lies 2 miles (3.2 km) away, to the east.
