= Croy, Highland =

Coordinates: 57.521175°N 4.011056°W

Croy: Scottish Gaelic: Crothaigh
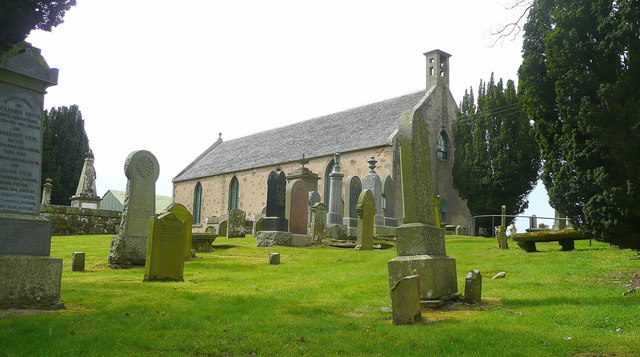
- Croy & Dalcross Parish Church

- Location within the Inverness area
- Population: 498 (2011 census)
- OS grid reference: NH796495
- Council area: Highland
- Lieutenancy area: Inverness-shire
- Country: Scotland
- Sovereign state: United Kingdom
- Post town: INVERNESS
- Postcode district: IV2 5
- Dialling code: 01667
- Police: Scotland
- Fire: Scottish
- Ambulance: Scottish
- UK Parliament: Moray West, Nairn and Strathspey
- Scottish Parliament: Inverness and Nairn
- Website: Community Council

Croy (Gaelic: Crothaigh) is a village between Inverness and Nairn, in the Highland council area in Scotland. The village looks over the Moray Firth and is located a few miles from Inverness Airport. The estimated population of the village is 498 according to the adjusted 2011 census.

== History ==
In the Early Middle Ages, the region where the village is situated was settled by the Picts prior to the merger of the Pictish and Gaelic kingdoms under Cínaed mac Ailpín to form the basis for the early Kingdom of Alba. This is evidenced by pieces of pictish jewelry from around 800AD which have been found in the area, many of which are displayed at the Inverness Museum and the National Museum of Scotland.

Kilravock Castle, the seat of the Clan Rose is located 1 mile (2 kilometres) from the village. The original keep was built in 1460 by the 7th Baron under licence granted by John, Lord of the Isles and Earl of Ross. The castle was significantly extended into its modern appearance by the addition of a large mansion house in 1553 by the 10th Baron. Known as the Black Baron, he also entertained Mary, Queen of Scots at Kilravock during her 1562 progress around Scotland.

The site of the Battle of Culloden is located within the same parish approximately 7 miles (11 kilometres) west of the village. The Jacobite army would have passed close to the village on the night of 15 April 1746 as part of their failed attempt to attack the government forces camped near Nairn. Prince Charles Edward Stuart was entertained at Kilravock Castle four days before the battle. This was followed by a visit by Prince William, Duke of Cumberland shortly after the Jacobite defeat. Tradition states that Baron Rose justified his impartial treatment of the two sides on the grounds of Highland hospitality despite his family’s Hanoverian sympathies

The local parish church was built in 1764 with significant repairs to the building made in 1829. The building is a typical Presbyterian rectangular church with a ball finial on the east gable and a birdcage bellcote on the west gable. The B-listed parish manse was built in 1855 by the Scottish architect James Matthews. Following the Disruption of 1843, followers of the Free Church worshipped jointly with parishioners in Cawdor until a dedicated church building and manse opened in Croy in 1852. The Free Church parishes of Nairn, Croy, Cawdor, and Ardersier were consolidated in 1987 and Croy Free Church was closed in 2004.

The village hall was built in 1907 with the aid of local funding in addition to a grant from the Carnegie Library fund. The land where the hall stands was donated by the Kilravock estate. A war memorial commemorating 27 local victims of the First World War was erected next to the village hall in 1919 with an additional 11 names added after the Second World War.

== Local community ==
The local area has expanded in recent years. Scotia Homes have completed a development of 40 homes on the outskirts of the village. A larger development of approximately 100 homes has been proposed for construction in the coming decades but this has worried the local community.

The local area is represented by Croy & Culloden Moor Community Council. The community run a village hall which serves numerous local organisations include the 11th Inverness (Croy) Scouts. The village shop closed down in May 2014. The nearest shop is now in Cawdor, 3 miles (5 kilometres) away. The village has a primary school in the catchment area of Culloden Academy. Nearby Cantraybridge College also provides rural vocational training for adults with learning disabilities as well as a community café which provides skills enhancing employment for young people with disabilities.

Kilravock Castle was opened as a Christian Guest House in May 1967 but no longer offers bed and breakfast accommodation. The castle and grounds are closed to the public but visiting the gardens is possible by leaving a donation. There are no staff to enable visits or tours of the Castle. The Kilravock Castle Christian Trust maintain The Granary (bunkhouse accommodation) which can be booked by young groups and the Rose Hall which can be booked for all kinds of events for up to 150 people.

Croy & Dalcross Parish Church is the local congregation of the Church of Scotland. Services take place every Sunday at 12 noon. The church also maintains a dedicated Church Hall. Local bus services between Croy and Inverness are run by Stagecoach in Inverness. There is no Sunday bus service.

== Notable people ==
- Gordon Campbell (1921-2005) - Politician; Secretary of State for Scotland under Edward Heath. Resident of the nearby Holme Rose estate

== Gallery ==
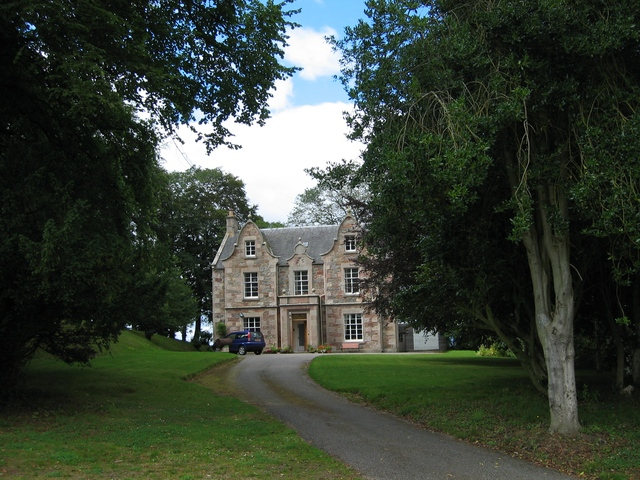
Croy Parish Manse

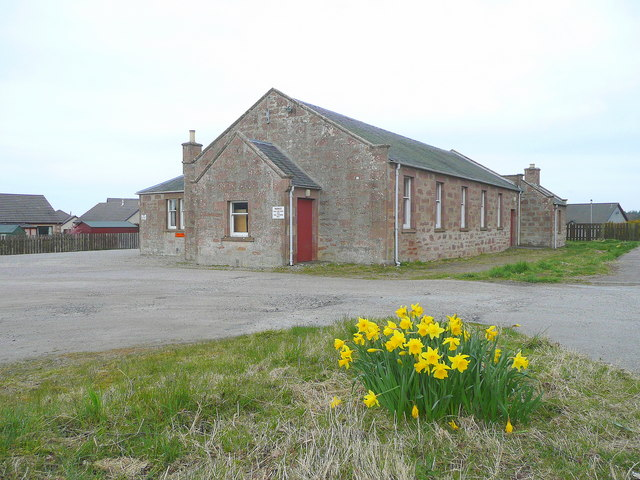
Croy Village Hall

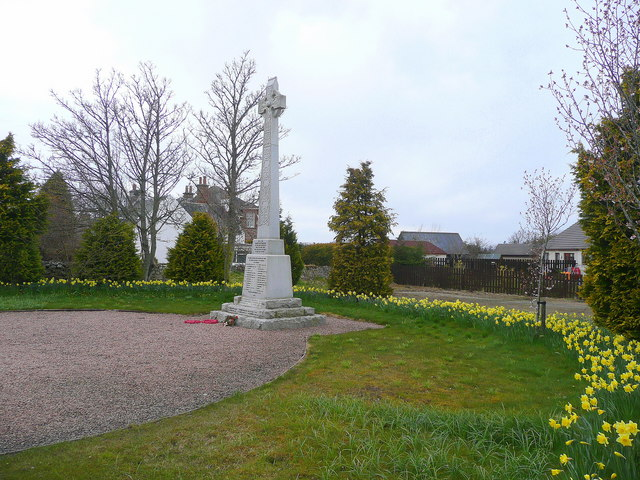
Croy War Memorial

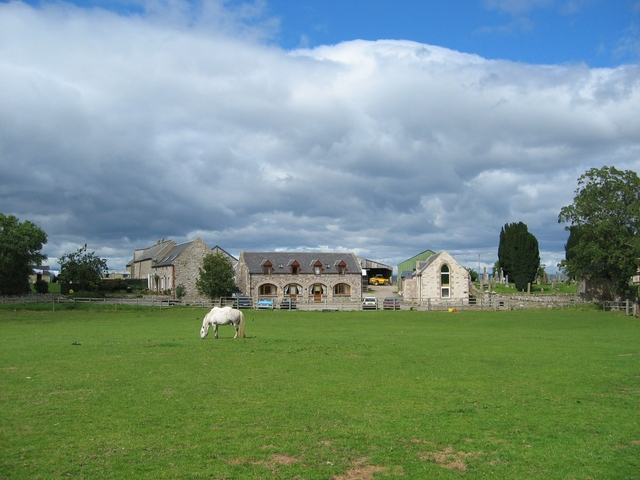
Mains of Croy farm

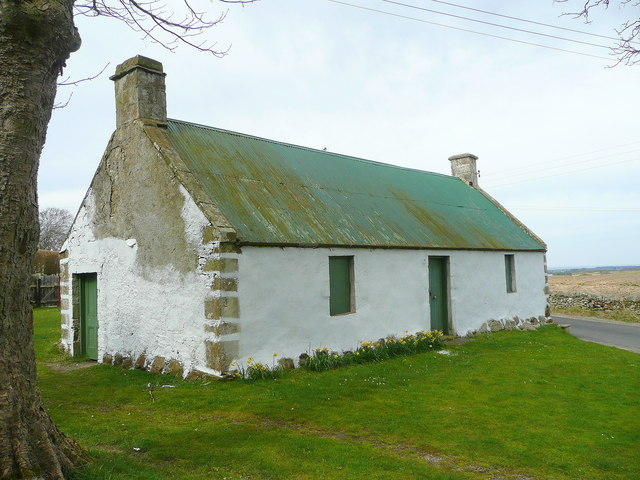
Derelict Cotter house by Croy church

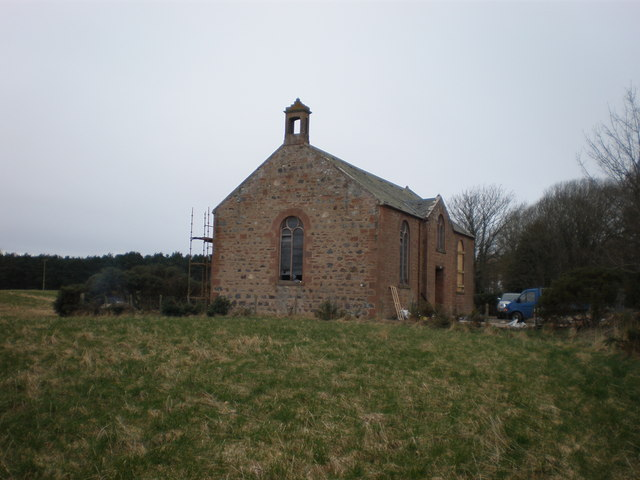
Former Croy Free Church undergoing renovations

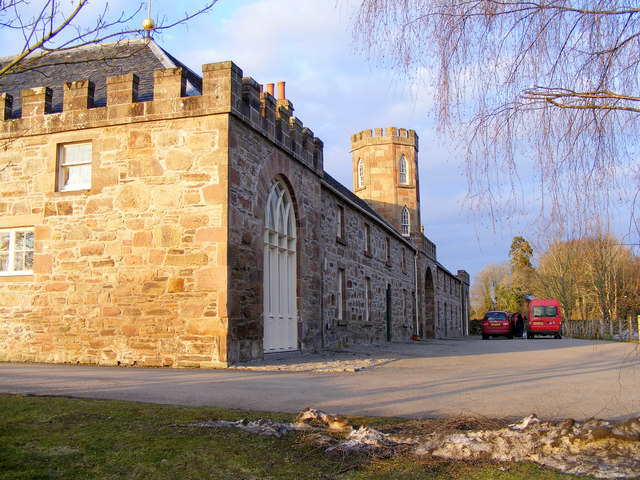
Cantraybridge College
