= Alexander Urquhart =

Scottish politician

Alexander Urquhart (died 1727) was a Scottish officer in the British Army and a Jacobite politician. He sat in the House of Commons of Great Britain from 1715 to 1727, and died bankrupt after his financial speculation failed.

Urquhart was the oldest son of John Urquhart of Newhall and his wife Jean, daughter of Colin Mackenzie of Redcastle, Ross-shire. He was a brother-in-law Sir Kenneth Mackenzie MP.

He had a brief career in the army, being commissioned in 1708 as an ensign in the 15th Foot. He was promoted to the rank of captain in Stanwix's Foot in 1710, and retired on half-pay in 1714.

He was the Member of Parliament (MP) for Cromartyshire from 1715 to 1722, and for Ross-shire from 1722 to 1727. He speculated heavily during the South Sea Bubble, and used his parliamentary privilege to shield himself from his creditors. He was forced to waive the immunity, and was successfully sued; he died bankrupt.

Parliament of Great Britain
| Vacant alternating constituency Title last held by Sir Kenneth Mackenzie, Bt | Member of Parliament for Cromartyshire; 1715–1722 | Vacant alternating constituency Title next held by Sir Kenneth Mackenzie, Bt |
| Preceded by Charles Ross | Member of Parliament for Ross-shire; 1722–1727 | Succeeded by Charles Ross |
