= Hugh Rose, 20th of Kilravock =

Scottish politician, soldier, and laird (1781–1827)

The Right Honourable Hugh Rose 20th Baron of Kilravock
- Coat of Arms of Clan Rose

Member of Parliament for Nairnshire
- In office 1812–1813
- Preceded by: Henry Campbell
- Succeeded by: James Mackintosh

Personal details
- Born: Hugh Rose; 8 February 1781 Kilravock Castle, Nairnshire, Scotland
- Died: 29 December 1827 (aged 46) Kilravock Castle, Nairnshire, Scotland
- Spouse(s): Katherine Baillie (m. 1805–1817) Catherine Mackintosh of Farr (m. 1819–1827)
- Children: 15
- Parents: Hugh Rose of Brea and Broadley (father); Elizabeth Rose, Lady of Kilravock (mother)
- Education: University of Aberdeen

Hugh Rose, 20th Baron of Kilravock (1781–1827), was a Member of Parliament for Nairnshire and the Chief of Clan Rose. He was the eldest son of Hugh Rose of Brea and Broadley and his wife Elizabeth Rose, Lady of Kilravock. Upon his mother's death in 1815, he inherited her estates and became the Clan Chief of the Roses.

== Early life ==
Hugh Rose was born the posthumous son of Hugh Rose of Broadley and Brea and his cousin, Elizabeth Rose, 19th Baroness of Kilravock. He was born three months after his father's death. Although he had an elder half-brother, James Rose, from his father's previous marriage, he was the heir to Kilravock Castle and the Chiefdom of Clan Rose through his mother.

Initially, this inheritance was contested by his half-brother's guardian, who argued that James Rose was the rightful heir, as their father, Hugh Rose, was the paternal grandson of Hugh Rose, 15th of Kilravock, and thus the next male heir to Hugh Rose, 18th of Kilravock. However, in 1787, the House of Lords ruled in favor of Elizabeth Rose, securing her son Hugh's claim. Elizabeth Rose wrote to a friend about her struggle:

I have ... fought for this old Highland castle, in which I now remain the solitary descendant of a long line of ancestors, devoting my time and powers to preserve, if possible, a remnant of their ample possessions for their infant representative; and, in the meantime, I will endeavour to give him such an education as may form him to be independent of my struggle, should it prove ultimately unsuccessful. - Rose, Hugh; Lachlan Shaw

== Military ==
Hugh Rose joined the Inverness Militia in 1802 as a major and was later promoted to lieutenant colonel. In 1806, he was also appointed Commandant and colonel of the Nairn Voluntary Infantry.

== Political career ==
On 28 October 1812, Hugh Rose was elected as the Member of Parliament for Nairnshire. This followed in the footsteps of his great-great-grandfather, Hugh Rose, 15th of Kilravock, who had represented Nairnshire in the first Parliament of Great Britain in 1707. However, Rose's time as an MP was short; he served only until 25 June 1813, when he resigned due to illness. To facilitate his resignation, Rose was appointed Steward of the Chiltern Hundreds on 29 June 1813. This position, created in the 16th century, allowed MPs to resign, as holding another Crown office was the only legal means to do so. Additionally, Rose was appointed Vice-Lieutenant of Nairnshire.

== Family ==
On 5 October 1805, Hugh Rose married Katherine Baillie, daughter of John Baillie of Dunain. Together, they had three sons and four daughters:

- Hugh Rose, 21st of Kilravock
- Isabella Rose
- Elizabeth Rose
- Margaret Rose
- Katherine Rose
- John Baillie Rose, 22nd of Kilravock (died 20 September 1854)

Katherine died, and on 22 April 1819, Rose married Catherine Mackintosh of Farr. They had five sons and three daughters:

- Major James Rose, 23rd of Kilravock (died 30 March 1909)
- William Rose
- Major Wellington Rose (died 19 June 1858)
- Alexander Rose
- Major Arthur Rose (died 1858)
- Anne Rose
- Harriet Rose
- Caroline Rose

Hugh Rose died on 29 December 1827 at Kilravock Castle and was succeeded by his eldest son, Hugh.

Peerage of Scotland
Preceded by Elizabeth Rose	Baron of Kilravock; 1815–1827	Succeeded by Hugh Rose
Parliament of Great Britain
Preceded by Henry Campbell	Member of Parliament for Nairnshire; 1812–1813	Succeeded by James Mackintosh
