= Charles Ross (Ross-shire MP, born 1721) =

Scottish soldier and Member of Parliament

Charles Ross (1721–1745) was a Scottish soldier and Member of Parliament.

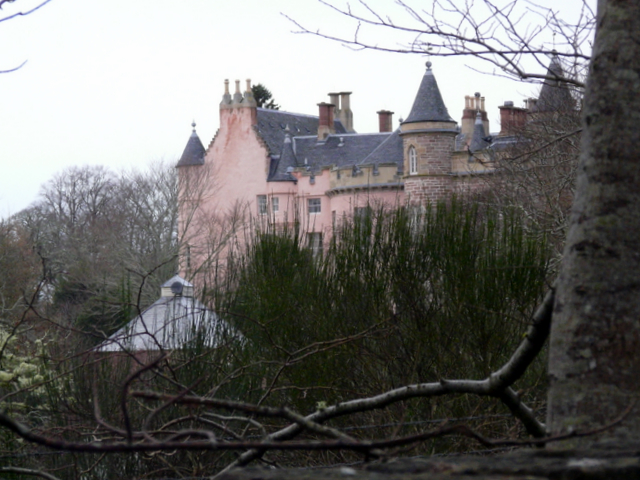
Balnagown Castle

He was the second son of George Ross, 13th Lord Ross and his wife Elizabeth, daughter of William Kerr, 2nd Marquess of Lothian. In 1732 he succeeded his great-uncle General Charles Ross to the estate of Balnagown.

He joined Colonel Douglas's regiment of marines as a second lieutenant in 1739, and became lieutenant and captain in the 3rd Regiment of Foot Guards in 1741. That year he was elected to Parliament for Ross-shire.

He was killed at the Battle of Fontenoy in 1745. Balnagown passed to his father.

Parliament of Great Britain
Preceded by Hugh Rose	Member of Parliament for Ross-shire; 1741–1745	Succeeded by Sir Harry Munro, Bt
