= Balloch, Highland =

Coordinates: 57.48904°N 4.09951°W

Balloch: Scottish Gaelic: Baile an Locha
- Location within the Inverness area
- Population: 1,390 (2020)
- OS grid reference: NH742462
- Council area: Highland
- Country: Scotland
- Sovereign state: United Kingdom
- Post town: Inverness
- Postcode district: IV2
- Police: Scotland
- Fire: Scottish
- Ambulance: Scottish
- UK Parliament: Inverness, Skye and West Ross-shire

Balloch (/bəˈlɒx/; Scottish Gaelic: Baile an Locha, IPA:[ˈpaləˈanˈɫ̪ɔxə]) is a residential village four miles (6.4 km) east of the city of Inverness, Scotland.

Many children living in the area attend Culloden Academy. Balloch also has a primary school, local shop, a village hall, a bowling club, a village trust and a community council. The Scottish School of Forestry also opened in Balloch in 2015, as part of Inverness College UHI.

Like nearby Culloden, Balloch is a village of some antiquity.
