= Charles Ross (British Army officer, born 1667) =

British general (1667–1732)

General Charles Ross
- Died: 5 August 1732; Bath
- Military career
- Allegiance: Kingdom of Great Britain
- Branch: British army
- Rank: General
- Conflicts: War of the Spanish Succession: Battle of Blenheim; Battle of Ramillies; Battle of Oudenarde; Battle of Malplaquet

Charles Ross (or Rosse; 8 February 1667 – 5 August 1732) was a Scottish general and Member of Parliament.

== Military career ==
Ross was born the second son of George Ross, 11th Lord Ross. He joined the British army as a cornet in the King's Own Royal Regiment of Scottish Horse some time before 1688. When Wynne's Regiment of Inniskilling Dragoons was raised in 1689, Ross joined as a captain, and served with the regiment in the Williamite War in Ireland. He went to Flanders with the regiment as lieutenant-colonel in 1694, and was appointed brevet colonel of the regiment on 16 February; when Wynne died on 15 July 1695 his colonelcy was made permanent. In 1704 he secured the title of the Royal Dragoons of Ireland for his regiment.

Ross was promoted brigadier-general on 9 March 1702, and major-general on 1 January 1704. He commanded a brigade of dragoons at the battles of Blenheim, Ramillies, Oudenarde and Malplaquet. He was further promoted to lieutenant-general on 1 January 1707, made Colonel-General of all the Dragoon Forces on 1 May 1711, and promoted to full general on 1 January 1712. He was removed from the colonelcy of the Royal Dragoons of Ireland by George I on 8 October 1715, but reappointed on 1 February 1729, holding the post until his death.

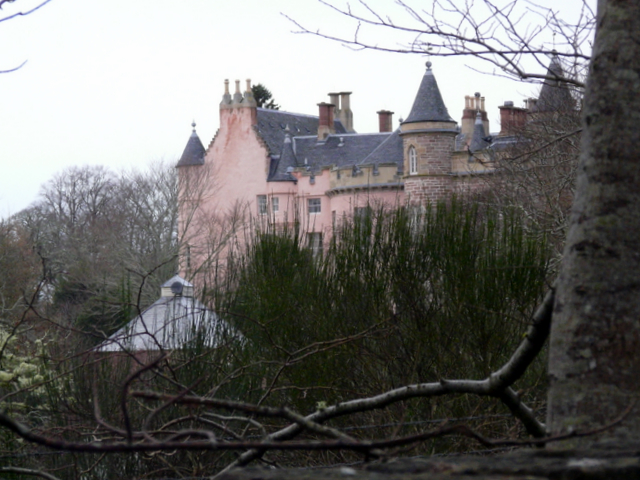
Balnagown Castle

== Political career ==
General Ross was Member of Parliament for Ross-shire from 1710 to 1722 and from 1727 to 1732. In September 1713 he was appointed Envoy Extraordinary to France, but did not take up the post.

== Death ==
He died at Bath on 5 August 1732 and was buried at Fearn Abbey, leaving his estate of Balnagown, which he had inherited from David Ross, the 13th Laird of Balnagown, in 1711, to his great-nephew Charles Ross.

== Citations ==
Parliament of Great Britain
Preceded by Hugh Rose	Member of Parliament for Ross-shire; 1710–1722	Succeeded by Alexander Urquhart
Preceded by Alexander Urquhart	Member of Parliament for Ross-shire; 1727–1733	Succeeded by John Munro
