= John Munro, 4th of Newmore =

Scottish soldier and politician

John Munro, 4th of Newmore was an 18th-century Scottish soldier and politician from Ross-shire, Scotland. He was seated at Newmore Castle, in Easter Ross, Scotland.

== Early life ==
John Munro, 4th of Newmore was a great-grandson of Sir George Munro, 1st of Newmore.

According to historian Alexander Mackenzie, John Munro, 4th of Newmore was the strongest man in Ross-shire in his day and that tradition relates the most extraordinary feats of strength performed by him. One old tradition is that Munro of Newmore had succeeded in raising a piece of ordnance to his chest which Mackenzie of Fairburn could only raise to his knee.

== Parliamentary career ==
John Munro, 4th of Newmore represented the county of Ross in parliament from 1733 to 1734.

== Military career ==
John Munro joined the army and was appointed captain in the 42nd Royal Highlanders, otherwise known as the Black Watch in May 1740.

=== Mutiny of the Black Watch ===
In 1743, 109 men of the Black Watch regiment mutinied while stationed in London, England and attempted to return to Scotland. However, Munro of Newmore was one of the officers who went after them and persuaded them to return.

=== Battle of Fontenoy ===
Munro of Newmore fought in Flanders at the Battle of Fontenoy on 11 May 1745, where he highly distinguished himself. He fought under the command of his distant cousin Colonel Sir Robert Munro, 6th Baronet, chief of the Highland Clan Munro. On account of John Munro's bravery, John was on 17 July 1745 promoted to the rank of lieutenant colonel.

General Stewart of Garth referring to the Battle of Fontenoy and John Munro's promotion says:

This gentleman was promoted the same year in a manner some what startling to our present idea of strict regard to justice, precedency, and length of service. Although there was a Major and three Captains senior to him in the regiment, he was appointed Lieutenant-Colonel in room of Sir Robert Munro, and continued in that situation until succeeded in 1749 by the late Duke of Argyll, then Lieutenant-Colonel Campbell, on the half pay of Lord Loudon's Highlanders. I have not been able to discover if this promotion from the command of a Company to that of a Regiment, was a reward for any marked good conduct in battle, in which it appears he commanded the Regiment in their more rapid movements, immediately under Sir Robert Munro, who from his extreme corpulency and being on foot could not move with the rapidity sometimes necessary.

John Munro died in 1749.

Parliament of Great Britain
| Preceded by Charles Ross | Member of Parliament for Ross-shire; 1733 – 1734 | Succeeded by Hugh Rose |
