= Hugh Rose, 16th of Kilravock =

Scottish politician, soldier and laird (1684–1755)

The Right Honourable Hugh Rose 16th Baron of Kilravock
- Coat of Arms Clan Rose

Member of Parliament for Ross-shire
- In office 1708–1710
- Preceded by: New office
- Succeeded by: Charles Rosse
- In office 1734–1741
- Preceded by: John Munro
- Succeeded by: Charles Ross

Personal details
- Born: 1 January 1684 Kilravock Castle, Nairnshire, Scotland
- Died: 5 May 1755 (aged 71) Kilravock Castle, Nairnshire, Scotland
- Spouse(s): Elizabeth Grant (m. 1704–1714) Jean Rose (m. 1719–1755)
- Children: 11
- Parents: Hugh Rose, 15th Baron of Kilravock (father); Margaret Campbell (mother)
- Education: University of Aberdeen

Hugh Rose, 16th Baron of Kilravock (1684-1755) was a Member of Parliament for Ross-shire and Chief of Clan Rose. The eldest son of Hugh Rose, 15th of Kilravock, he inherited his father's estates and the Clan Chiefdom on his father's death in 1732.

== Early life ==
Rose was born the son of Hugh Rose, 15th of Kilravock and his first wife, Margaret Campbell, daughter of Sir Hugh Campbell, 5th of Cawdor. Born the son of the Chief of Clan Rose, he was a member of an ancient family who received their title from John Balliol in 1293, after inheriting their estates at Kilravock Castle in around 1290. His father an extremely ambitious man gave him a broad and liberal education both in Scotland and abroad. His education in Scotland was at the University of Aberdeen.

== Political career ==
Rose's father had parliamentary ambitions for him, whilst Nairnshire were no difficulties in his election, Rose's father put him up for election in Ross-shire. His father was at the time Sheriff of Ross and he used his position to leverage support for Rose's election to Parliament. The other factions in Ross-shire were the Clans Ross and Munro, Rose's father created faggot voters and won by a single vote which was his own. His opposition candidate the Master of Ross immediately called to impugn Rose and his father for the manner in which they brought about the victory. However, due to his alignment with both his brother-in-law General Alexander Grant of Castle Grant (in whose regiment he served from 1708 until 1713 as a captain) and also Lord Seafield who described him as his "friend" and one who he hoped "would serve her Majesty faithfully". In January 1710 however his election to Ross-shire was declared void.

During the Jacobite rising of 1715 Rose helped his father in the defence of Kilravock Castle. During the 1715 Uprising, Rose and his father shifted their support to John Campbell, 2nd Duke of Argyll. However, due to their earlier losses, Rose did not play an active part in politics until the death of his father in 1732 at which point he inherited his father's estates and also the Sheriffdom of Ross. Rose remained as Sheriff until 1734 at which point he resigned in order to be returned as Member of Parliament for Ross-shire. Rose served as MP until 1741 at which point he stood down.

The political manoeuvrability of the Roses is perhaps best shown by him during the Jacobite rising of 1745 when he entertained both Charles Edward Stuart and the Duke of Cumberland on the same night, one at his family seat, Kilravock Castle and the other at his house in Nairn.

== Family ==
Rose married firstly, Elizabeth Grant, daughter of Sir Ludovick Grant of Freuchie and Grant and Janet Brodie of Brodie on 23 May 1704, from which he received 18,000 merks. They had two sons and one daughter, only the sons survived to adulthood:

- Hugh Rose, 17th of Kilravock (1705-1772), father of Elizabeth Rose, Lady of Kilravock.
- Lewis Rose.

Elizabeth Grant died in 1714 and Rose remarried his cousin Jean Rose, daughter of Hugh Rose of Broadley in Banff in 1719. They had a further two sons and six daughters, only one son and four daughters survived:

- John Rose (1707-?), an officer in the army and ancestor of the Roses of Coulmony, the Roses of Montreal and the Roses of Hardwick House.
- Henrietta Rose (died 1795), married Sir William Dunbar, 2nd Baronet.
- Anne Rose, married Sir Harry Munro, 7th Baronet.
- George Rose, became an army officer.
- Margaret Rose (died 1759), married Dr. Joshua Mackenzie of Edinburgh.
- Jean Rose, married Duncan Ross of Kindeace.
- Alexandrina Rose.
- Caroline Rose.

Hugh Rose, 16th of Kilravock died in May 1755 at his house, Kilravock Castle.

Peerage of Scotland
Preceded by Hugh Rose	Baron of Kilravock; 1732–1755	Succeeded by Hugh Rose
Honorary titles
Preceded by Hugh Rose	Sheriff of Ross; 1732–1734	Vacant
Parliament of Great Britain
Preceded by George Mackenzie	Member of Parliament for Ross-shire; 1708– 1710	Succeeded by Charles Rosse
Parliament of Great Britain
Preceded by John Munro	Member of Parliament for Ross-shire; 1734– 1741	Succeeded by Charles Ross
