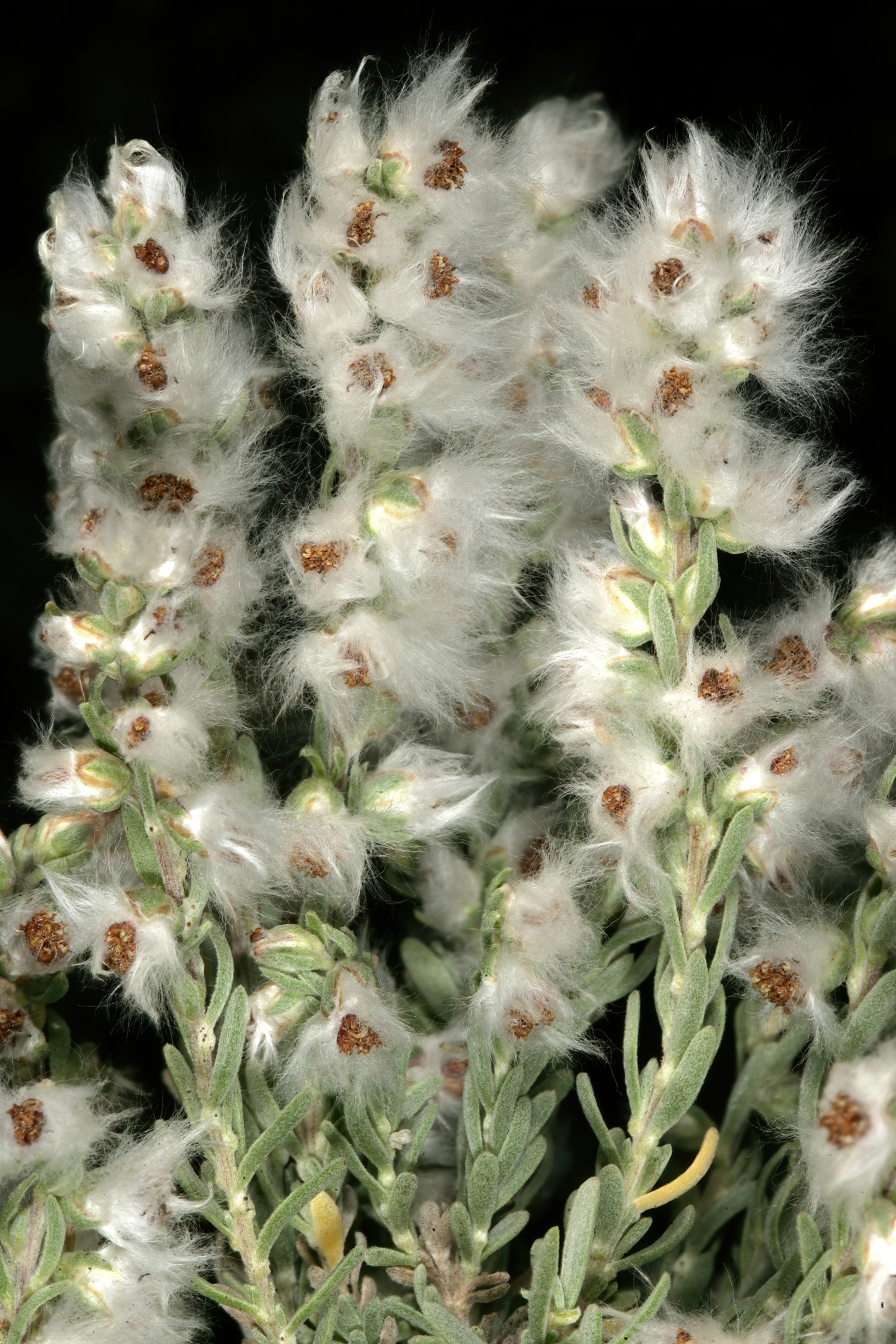

Conservation status
- Least Concern (SANBI Red List)

Scientific classification
- Kingdom: Plantae
- Clade: Tracheophytes
- Clade: Angiosperms
- Clade: Eudicots
- Clade: Asterids
- Order: Asterales
- Family: Asteraceae
- Genus: Eriocephalus
- Species: E. racemosus

Binomial name
- Eriocephalus racemosus L.

Synonyms
- Eriocephalus simplicifolius Salisb.; Eriocephalus spicatus Burm. ex DC.

= Eriocephalus racemosus =

Flowering plant endemic to the Cape Provinces

Eriocephalus racemosus is a species of flowering plant in the genus Eriocephalus. It is endemic to the Cape Provinces of South Africa. It is also called the kapokbos (Afrikaans for snow bush).

== Distribution ==
Eriocephalus racemosus is found in sandy soil along the coast, extending from Hondeklip Bay to Melklbosstrand, and from Port Elizabeth to Lambert's Bay.

== Subspecies ==
There are two infraspecific named varieties of the species racemosus:

- Eriocephalus racemosus var. racemosus;
- Eriocephalus racemosus var. affinis (DC.) Harv.

== Conservation status ==
Eriocephalus racemosus is classified as Least Concern as it is quite common in its natural habitat.

== Uses ==
This species, Eriocephalus racemosus, along with Eriocephalus ericoides, have been used at the Cape for their diaphoretic and diuretic effects.
