= William Caulfeild (British Army officer) =

Major William Caulfeild was an officer in the British Army who is primarily known for his work supervising road and bridge construction in the Scottish Highlands in the 18th century.

== Early life ==
He was born in Ireland, the son of the Hon. Toby Caulfeild who was a son of the first Viscount Charlemont. By the early 1730s, Caulfeild was serving as a Subaltern in the British Army.

== Roads and Bridges ==
General Wade appointed him Inspector of Roads for Scotland in 1732. After the departure of General Wade in 1740, Caulfeild became responsible for directing all construction of new roads and bridges in Scotland until his death.

Although he is not as well known as Wade, he is associated with the construction of far more roads than his predecessor. General Wade was responsible for 250 miles (400 km) of road, 40 bridges and 2 forts – whereas Caulfeild was responsible for 900 miles (1,400 km) of road and over 600 bridges.

The largest individual lengths of roads built under the direction of Caulfeild included the military roads from Stirling to Fort William (93 miles), Coupar Angus to Fort George (100 miles), and Bridge of Sark to Port Patrick.

== Other Duties ==
During the Jacobite rising of 1745 Caulfeild also served in the position of quartermaster to Sir John Cope. In 1747, he was also made Deputy Governor of Inverness Castle.

== Personal life ==
Caulfeild had at least one son, whom he named Wade Toby Caulfeild after General Wade.

In later life, Caulfeild lived at his home Cradlehall which was built just outside Inverness.

Major Caulfeild died in 1767.
