= Hugh Rose, 24th of Kilravock =

British soldier and laird (1863-1946)

Lt Col Hugh Rose 24th Baron of Kilravock CMG DL JP
- Coat of Arms Clan Rose
- Born: 10 August 1863; Kilravock Castle, Nairnshire, Scotland
- Died: 22 February 1946 (aged 82); Kilravock Castle, Nairnshire, Scotland
- Education: Wellington College; RMC, Sandhurst
- Spouse: Ruth Antoinette Guillemard (m. 1920–1946)
- Children: 3
- Parents: James Rose, 23rd of Kilravock (father); Anna Maria Twemlow (mother)
- Military career
- Allegiance: United Kingdom
- Branch: British Army
- Rank: Lieutenant colonel
- Unit: The Black Watch (Royal Highlanders)
- Commands: 42nd The Black Watch
- Conflicts: Nile Expedition; Second Boer War; First World War

Lt Col Hugh Rose, 24th Baron of Kilravock CMG DL JP (1863–1946) was a decorated British Army officer serving in the Black Watch, rising to become Lieutenant Colonel of the 1st Battalion, Black Watch. Rose was also the Chief of Clan Rose and a Deputy Lieutenant and Justice of the Peace of the County of Nairn.

== Early life ==
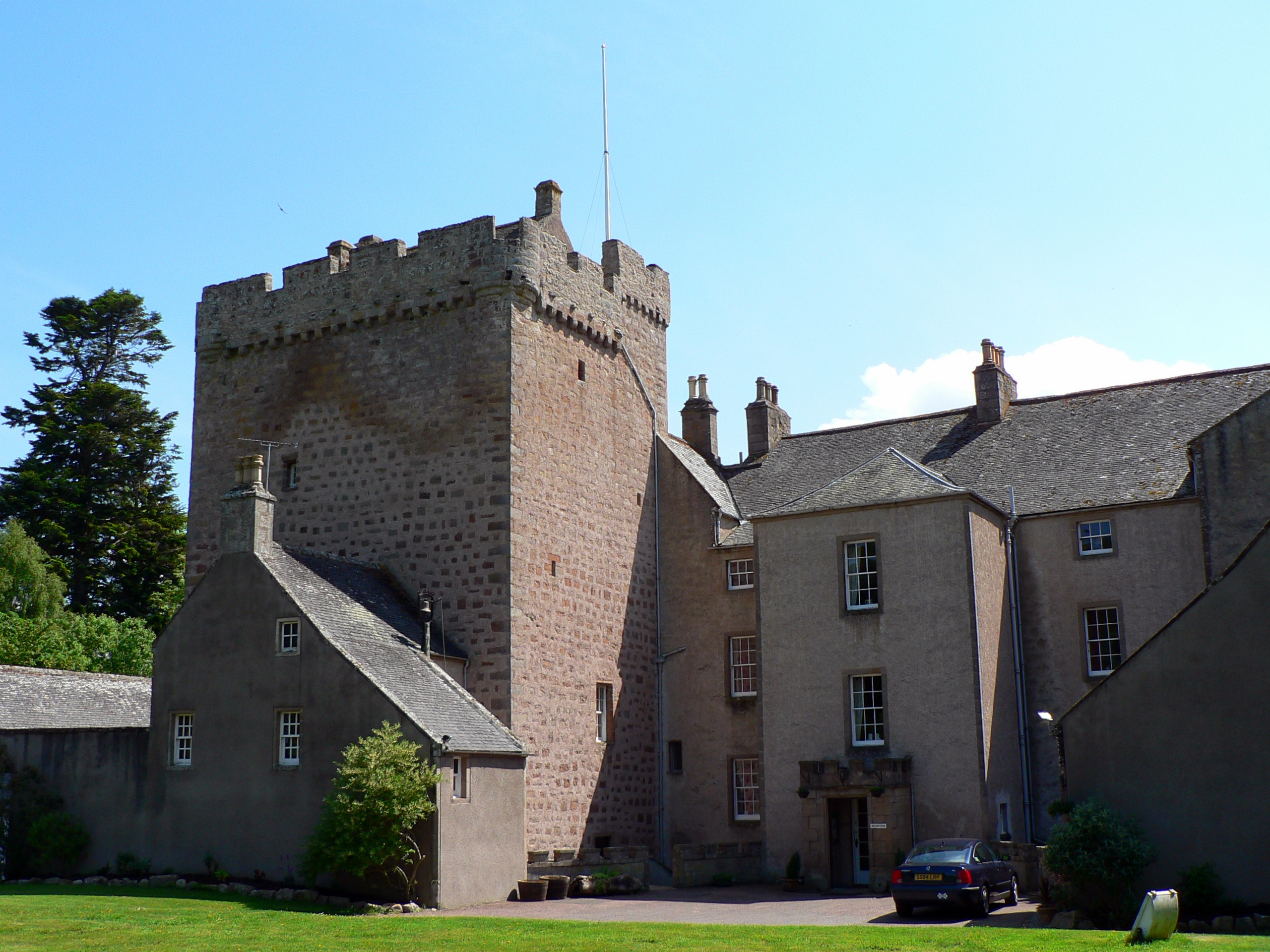
Rose's family seat, Kilravock Castle

Rose was born at Kilravock Castle on 10 August 1863, the son of Major James Rose, 23rd of Kilravock and Anna Maria Twemlow, the daughter of General George Twemlow. He was educated at Wellington College, Berkshire and went on to go to the Royal Military College, Sandhurst.

== Career ==
Following Sandhurst, Rose was commissioned into the Black Watch and served from 1884 to 1885 in the Nile Expedition, for which he was awarded the Egypt Medal with two clasps and the Bronze Star. In 1890, Rose was appointed Deputy Lieutenant of the County of Nairn, and in 1899 Justice of the Peace in Nairn. From 1901 to 1902 he served in the Second Boer War and was awarded the Queen's South Africa Medal with four claps. Rose inherited the title Baron of Kilravock along with the position of Chief of Clan Rose on his father's death on 30 March 1909. He also served in the First World War in which he was Mentioned in Despatches four times and in 1916 was appointed a Companion of the Order of Saint Michael and Saint George. He was also awarded the Order of Agricultural Merit by the French in 1917. Rose ended the war as a Lieutenant Colonel and commander of the 1st Battalion of the Black Watch. Following the First World War, he retired to his home in Nairnshire, Kilravock Castle.

== Personal life ==
Rose married, Ruth Antoinette Guillemard, daughter of Walter George Guillemard of Malverleys, Hampshire, on 21 October 1920, they had three children:

- Lt Hugh Rose, Master of Kilravock (26 November 1921 – 24 October 1942), educated at Winchester College and Magdalene College, Cambridge, served in the Second World War in the 1st Battalion, Black Watch and was killed in action at the Second Battle of El Alamein.
- Anna Elizabeth Guillemard Rose, 25th Baroness of Kilravock (28 May 1924 – December 2012), on the death of her brother, she inherited Kilravock Castle and the Barony of Kilravock from her father, she died unmarried.
- Madeleine Katharen Rose (born 30 January 1927), married Hugh Heriot Baird and was the mother of David Hugh Heriot Baird Rose, 26th of Kilvarock who inherited Kilravock Castle and the Barony of Kilravock from his aunt, Anna Rose, 25th of Kilravock.

Rose died at Kilravock Castle on 22 February 1946 aged 82, having outlived his son, Hugh, Master of Kilravock, his titles and estate went to his daughter, Anna.

Peerage of Scotland
| Preceded by James Rose | Baron of Kilravock; 1909–1946 | Succeeded by Anna Rose |
