= Eriocephalus klinghardtensis =

Conservation status
- Least Concern (IUCN 3.1)

Scientific classification
- Kingdom: Plantae
- Clade: Tracheophytes
- Clade: Angiosperms
- Clade: Eudicots
- Clade: Asterids
- Order: Asterales
- Family: Asteraceae
- Genus: Eriocephalus
- Species: E. klinghardtensis

Binomial name
- Eriocephalus klinghardtensis M.A.N.Müll.

Species of flowering plant

Eriocephalus klinghardtensis is a species of flowering plant in the family Asteraceae.

== Information ==
Eriocephalus klinghardtensis is found only in Namibia. The natural habitat of this species is rocky areas. The population trend of this species is also at a stable rate with no recorded threats that could negatively affect the species in a dramatic way. The habitat of Eriocephalus klinghardtensis can be found in terrestrial systems. It is a part of the compositae. They can also be found on inland cliffs and mountain peaks. Eriocephalus klinghardtensis is recorded to be found in about 510 subpopulations.
