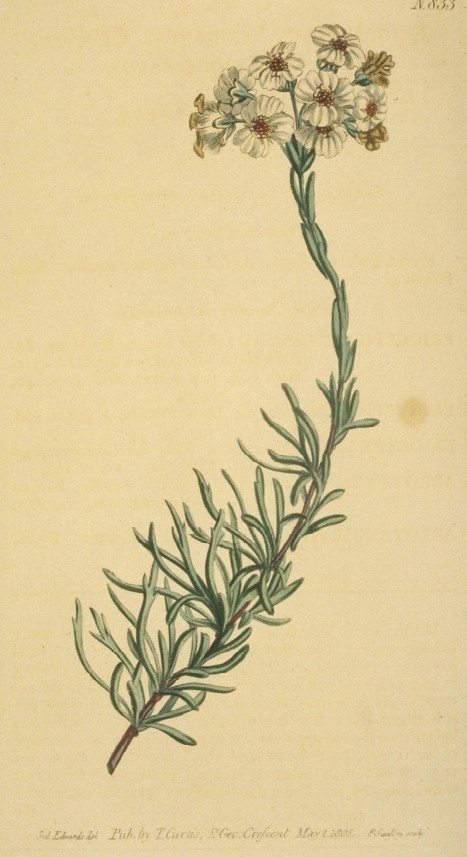
- Eriocephalus africanus

Scientific classification
- Kingdom: Plantae
- Clade: Tracheophytes
- Clade: Angiosperms
- Clade: Eudicots
- Clade: Asterids
- Order: Asterales
- Family: Asteraceae
- Subfamily: Asteroideae
- Tribe: Anthemideae
- Genus: Eriocephalus; L.

Synonyms
- Brachygyne Cass.; Monochlaena Cass.; Cryptogyne Cass. 1827, rejected name not Cryptogyne Hook.f. 1876 (Sapotaceae); Eriocephalus sect. Cryptogyne (Cass.) DC.

= Eriocephalus =

Genus of flowering plants

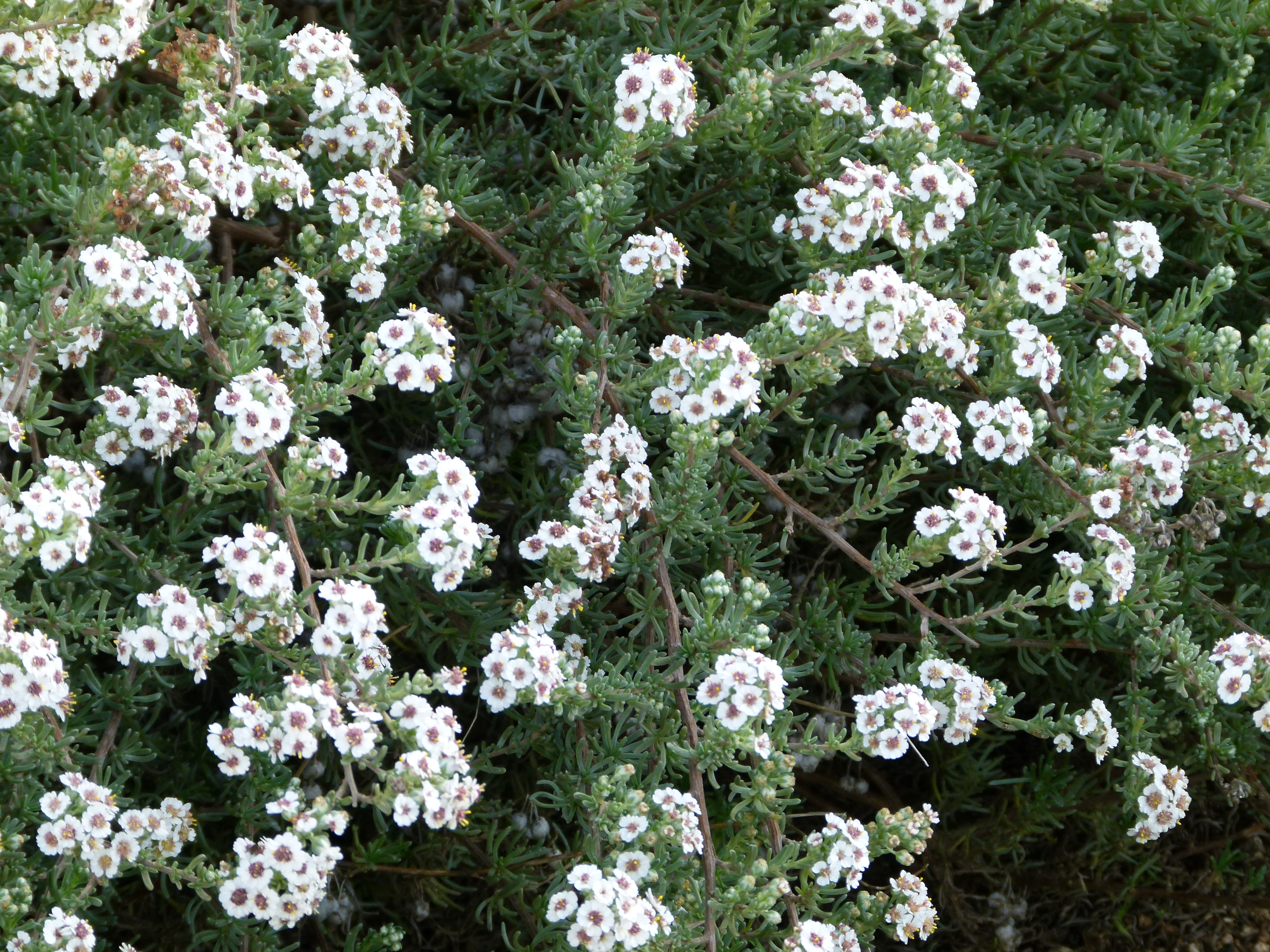
Eriocephalus africanus in flower

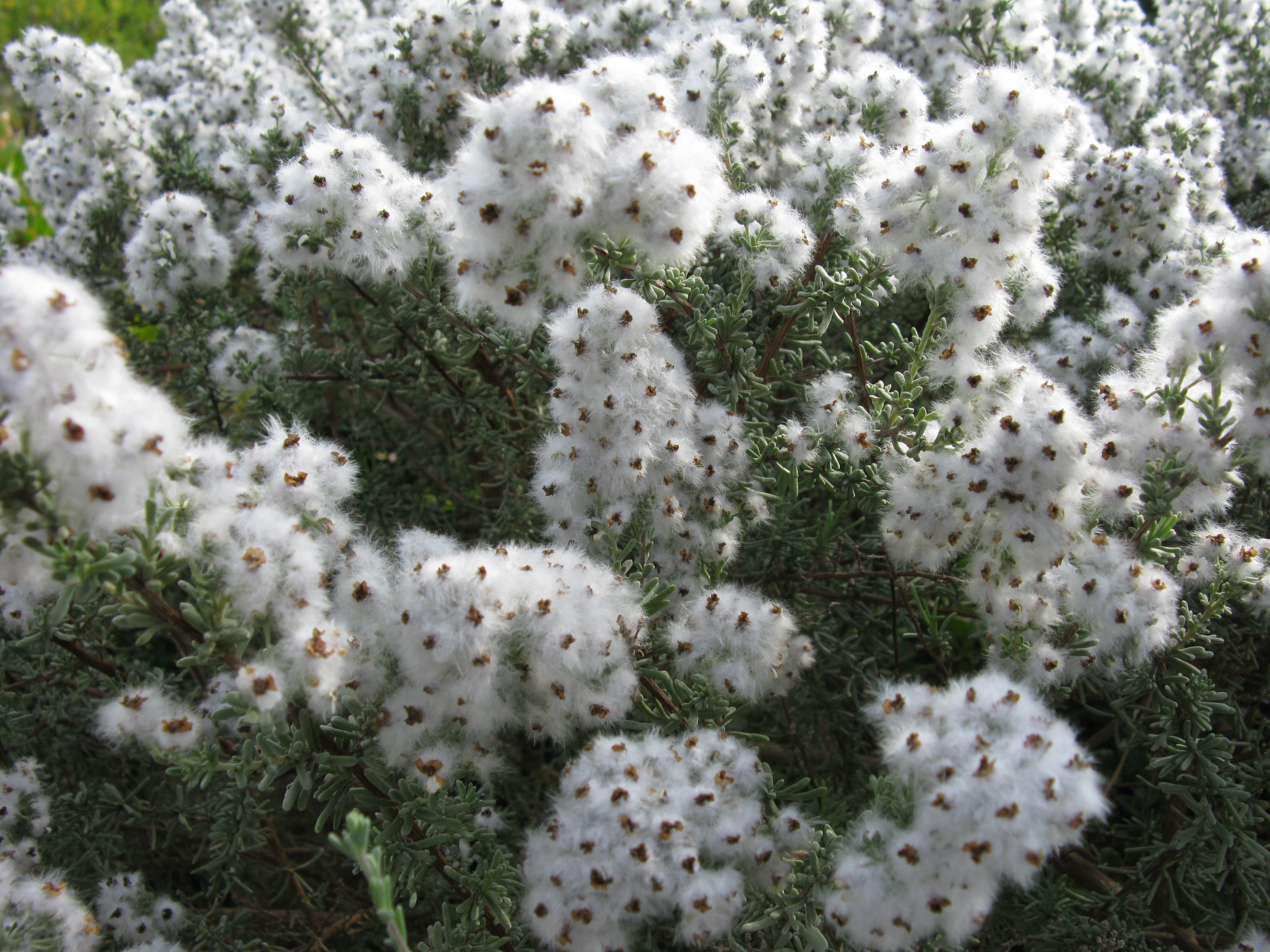
Eriocephalus africanus after seeding

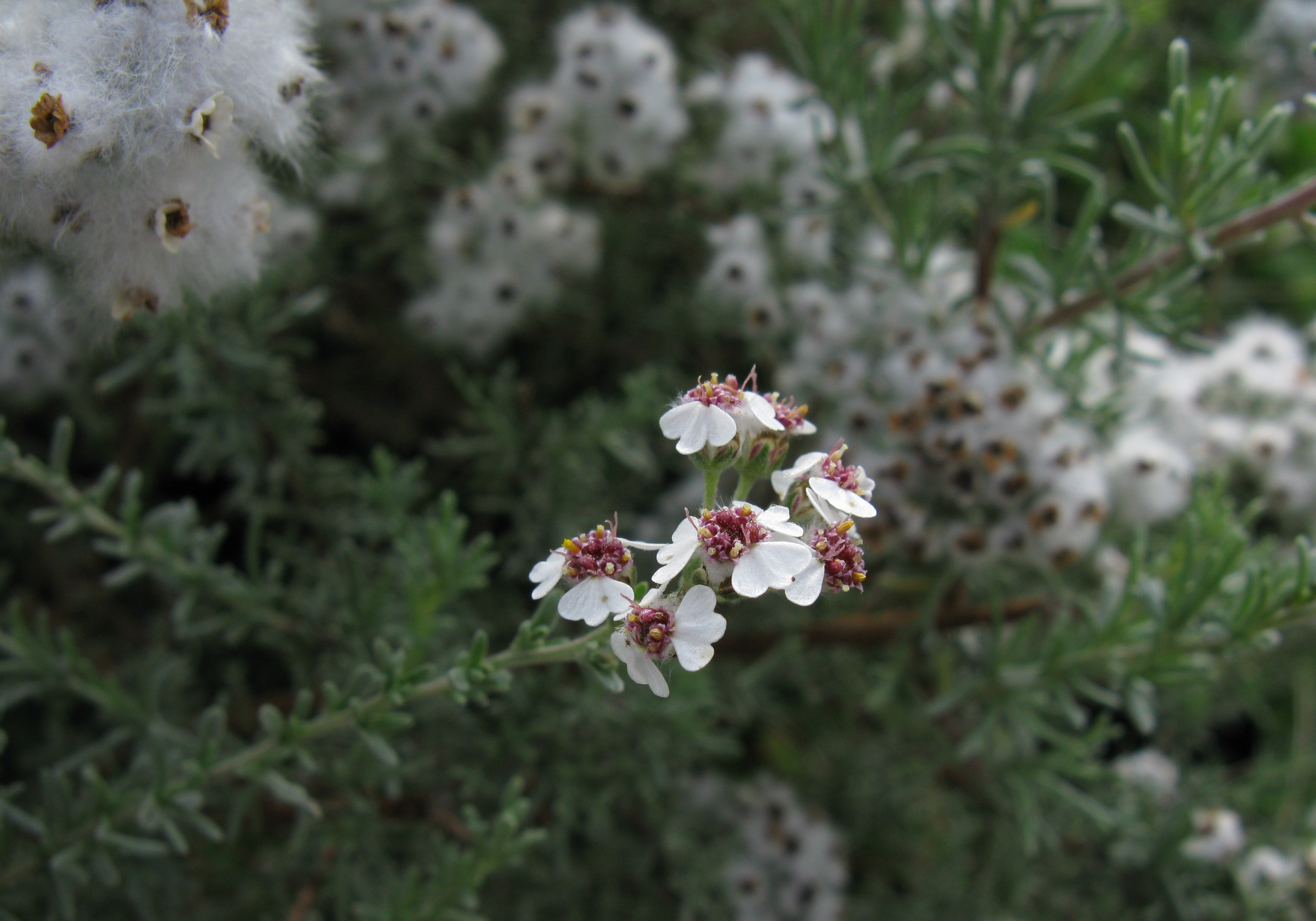
Eriocephalus africanus; details of inflorescence

Eriocephalus is a genus of African flowering plants in the daisy family.

== General description ==
The genus Eriocephalus appears in the Species Plantarum of Carl Linnaeus, item 926 (1753), and was dealt with by William Henry Harvey in Flora Capensis 3: 200 (1865)

The plants are more or less sclerophyllous bushes or shrublets, some species tending to be thorny, leaves silky-greyish, most species are finely villous, but some are glabrous. They have a characteristic, rather spicy aroma, especially when bruised. This has been compared to the aroma of rosemary, though it is not convincingly so. However, the plants have been used similarly in cooking. The leaves are generally ericoid, alternate or subopposite, often fascicled.

The flowering heads are small, with short, racemose or subumbellate peduncles. In a few species the flowers are solitary. The flowers are heterogamous, a few female florets in each head occurring together with several bisexual, sterile disk-florets. The head becomes very woolly after flowering, surrounded by involucral bracts. The receptacle is paleate and woolly.

== Distribution ==
The various species occur mainly in South Africa and Namibia.

== Uses ==
Possibly because of its fancied resemblance to rosemary and its pleasant herbal odour, various species have been used on a small scale in cooking. Free range livestock browse the plants to various degrees, and along with various other Karooid bushes, this lends the meat a distinctive flavour and a character that some people relish in Karoo lamb for example.

Various species also have been used widely in folk medicine. The leaf of Eriocephalus africanus when lightly rubbed, has a pleasant odour. The plant yields 0.3% of a dark green petroleum ether extract, which, on steam distillation in vacuo, yields 10 to 15 per cent of a fairly viscous, yellowish, volatile oil. It has a herbaceous and balsamic odour. This species, Eriocephalus ericoides, and also Eriocephalus racemosus, have been used at the Cape for their diaphoretic and diuretic effects.

Together with Metalasia muricata, Eriocephalus punctulatus has been used by the Southern Sotho to fumigate the hut of a person suffering from a cold or diarrhoea, and to fumigate a hut during illness or after a death.

The Nama use a decoction of Eriocephalus umbellulatus DC., as a colic remedy, and the early Cape settlers apparently used it similarly. Extraction yields a light yellow volatile oil with a sharp, though pleasant, aromatic odour and a burning taste. Until modern times the plant has been variously used as a household medicine in the Western Province, as a tincture for heart troubles and oedema, and as a foot-bath for assorted conditions.

Some species and varieties are gaining in popularity as garden plants, partly because of their herbal and culinary value. partly because of their Karooid character, and partly because of their attractive, persistently snowy appearance, both in flower and in seed. They also are valued in bird-friendly gardens, because some species of birds actively collect the woolliness of the empty seed follicles for their nests.

== Species ==
According to The Plant List, the genus Eriocephalus contains the following accepted species:

- Eriocephalus africanus L.
- Eriocephalus ambiguus (DC.) M.A.N.Müll.
- Eriocephalus aromaticus C.A.Sm.
- Eriocephalus brevifolius (DC.) M.A.N.Müll.
- Eriocephalus capitellatus DC.
- Eriocephalus decussatus Burch.
- Eriocephalus dinteri S.Moore
- Eriocephalus ericoides (L.f.) Druce
- Eriocephalus eximius DC.
- Eriocephalus giessii M.A.N.Müll.
- Eriocephalus glandulosus M.A.N.Müll.
- Eriocephalus grandiflorus M.A.N.Müll.
- Eriocephalus karooicus M.A.N.Müll.
- Eriocephalus kingesii Merxm. & Eberle
- Eriocephalus klinghardtensis M.A.N.Müll.
- Eriocephalus longifolius M.A.N.Müll.
- Eriocephalus luederitzianus O.Hoffm.
- Eriocephalus macroglossus B.Nord.
- Eriocephalus merxmuelleri M.A.N.Müll.
- Eriocephalus microcephalus DC.
- Eriocephalus microphyllus DC.
- Eriocephalus namaquensis M.A.N.Müll.
- Eriocephalus pauperrimus Merxm. & Eberle
- Eriocephalus pedicellaris DC.
- Eriocephalus pinnatus O.Hoffm.
- Eriocephalus punctulatus DC. — Cape chamomile
- Eriocephalus purpureus Burch.
- Eriocephalus racemosus L.
- Eriocephalus scariosus DC.
- Eriocephalus sericeus Gaudich.
- Eriocephalus spinescens Burch.
- Eriocephalus tenuifolius DC.
- Eriocephalus tenuipes C.A.Sm.
- Eriocephalus tuberculosus DC.
- Eriocephalus umbellatus Auct.
