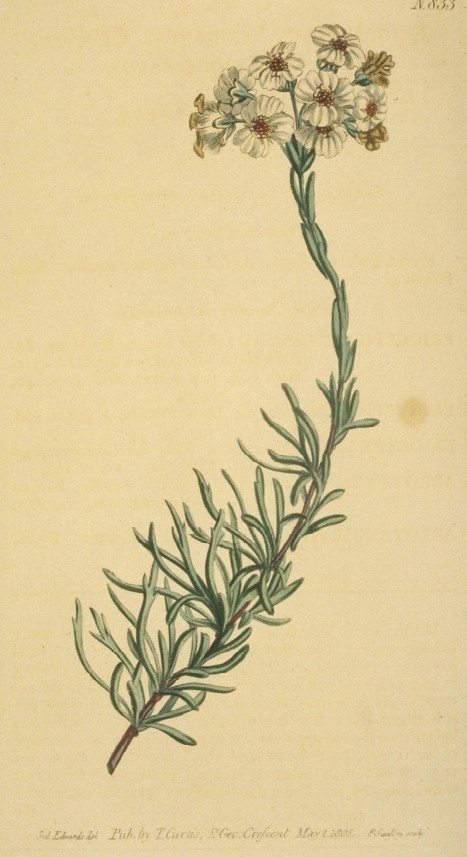

Scientific classification
- Kingdom: Plantae
- Clade: Tracheophytes
- Clade: Angiosperms
- Clade: Eudicots
- Clade: Asterids
- Order: Asterales
- Family: Asteraceae
- Genus: Eriocephalus
- Species: E. africanus

Binomial name
- Eriocephalus africanus L.

Synonyms
- Eriocephalus corymbosus Moench; Eriocephalus frutescens R.Br.; Eriocephalus paniculatus Cass.; Eriocephalus racemosus Gaertn. nom. illeg.; Eriocephalus septifer Cass.; Eriocephalus septulifer DC.; Eriocephalus sericeus Gaudich. ex DC.; Eriocephalus umbellulatus Cass. nom. illeg.; Eriocephalus umbellulatus DC.; Eriocephalus variifolius Salisb.; Monochlaena racemosa Cass.

= Eriocephalus africanus =

Cape snow bush

Species of flowering plant

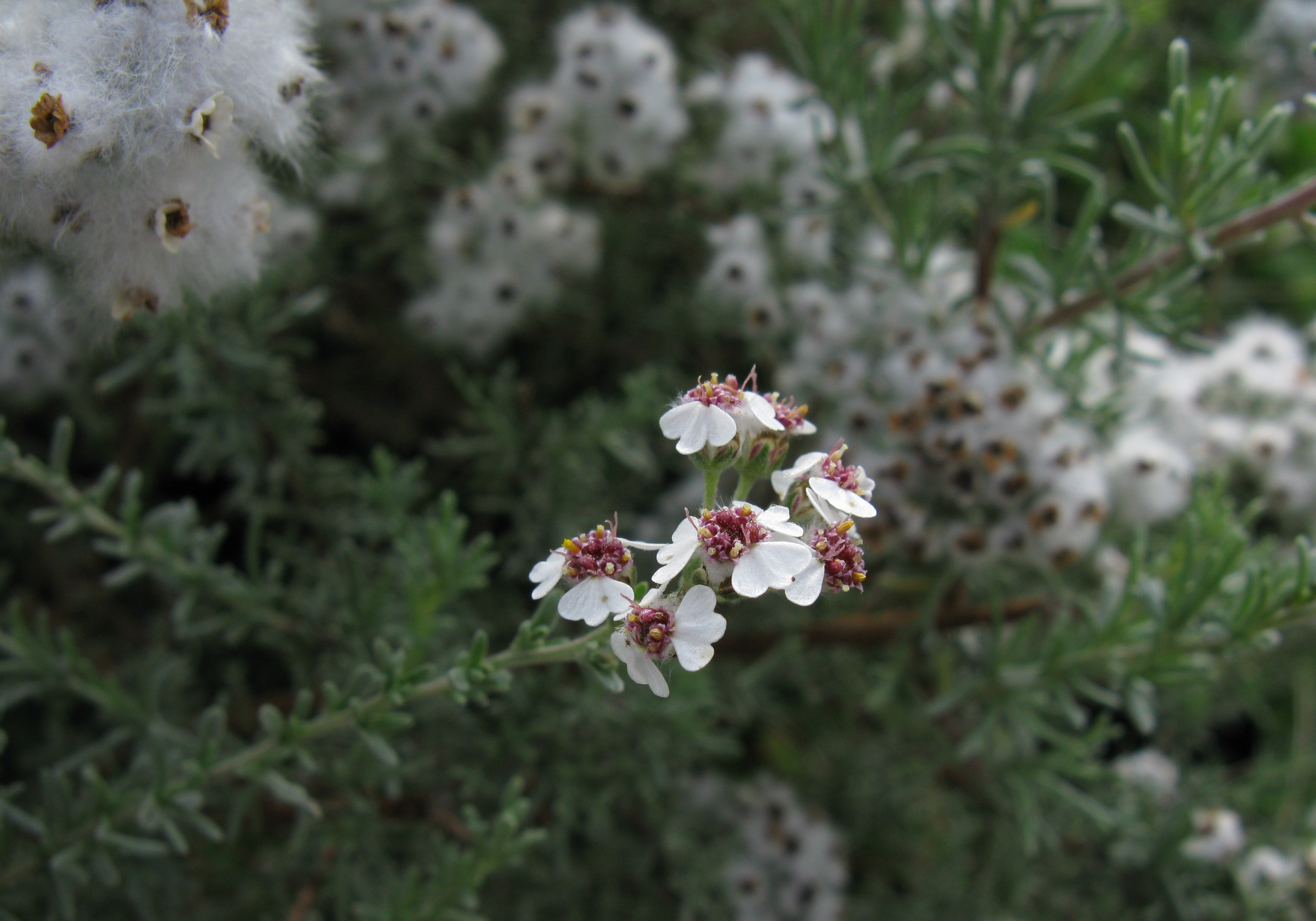
Eriocephalus africanus - detail of inflorescence

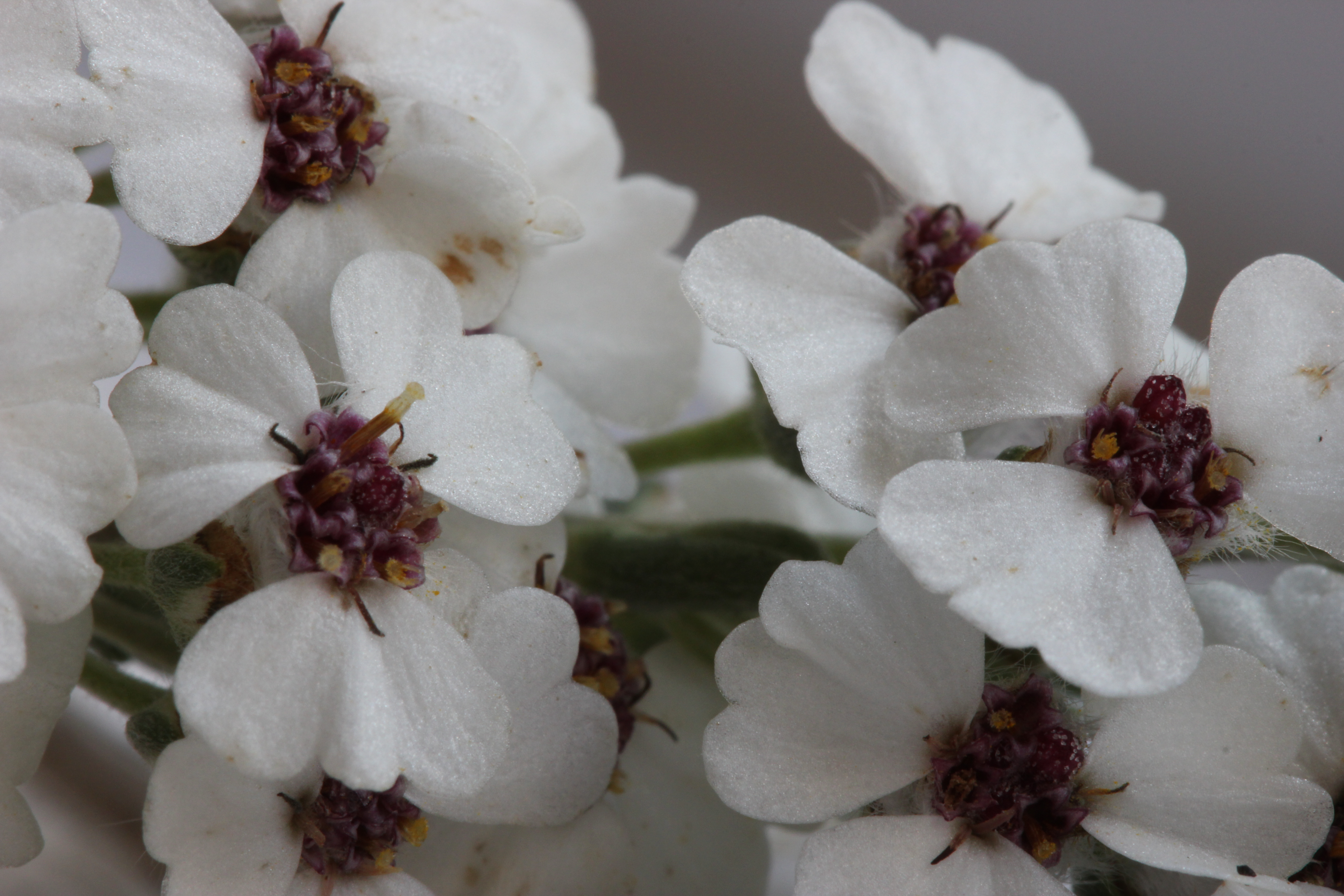
Eriocephalus africanus detail of flowers

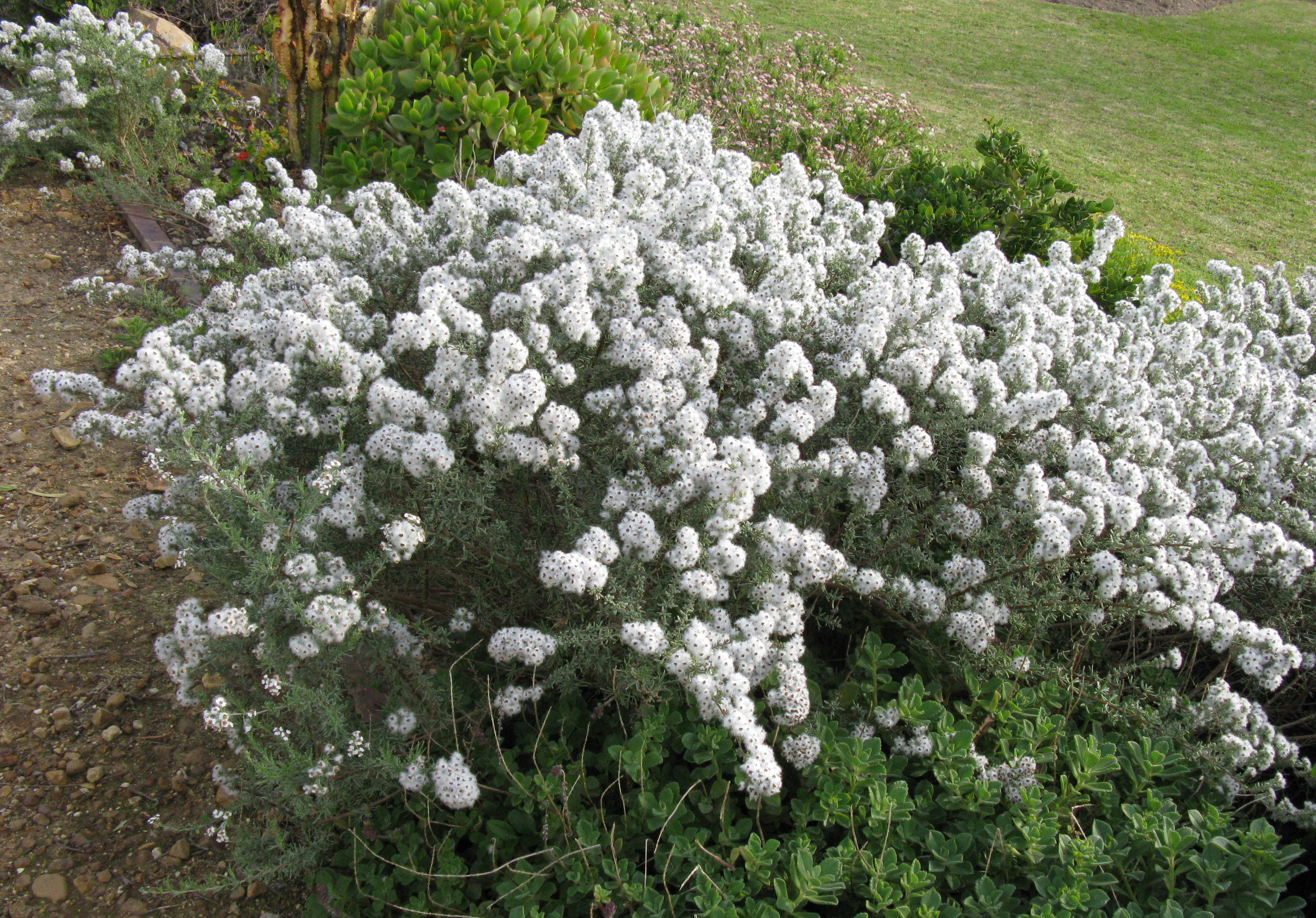
The common name "snow bush" refers to its appearance when covered either by felted seed heads or white flowers

Eriocephalus africanus is a bushy shrublet indigenous to South Africa. It has a wide distribution in the Western and Eastern Cape, and in Namaqualand. The plant has several common names in various languages. It is known as the Kapokbossie or Wild Rosemary (Afrikaans "wilde roosmaryn") referring to its fancied resemblance to rosemary. The superficial resemblance is in the foliage, which, though softer and not glossy, grows in a habit similar to that of the common Mediterranean rosemary, although the two species are not related.

Eriocephalus africanus is fragrant, with lightly felted foliage that gives the plant a matt silvery appearance. The inflorescences are small brown and pale yellow heads borne in corymbs; each head bears a few bisexual ray florets with abortive ovaries and snowy white petals that practically cover a bush in flower. The ray florets surround usually some four to eight female florets in the centre.

Ecologically the plant is important to many insects as a source of nectar and pollen, and as a minor browse to flocks and antelope. Essential oil derived from E. africanus is used as an ingredient in medicinal and perfume products. The plant has been used in traditional medicine and in cooking.

== Essential oil ==
Essential oil extracts of E. africanus are prepared by steam distillation, and contain the following primary aroma components:

- linalyl acetate 18.0%
- 1,8-cineole 4.3%
- para-cymene 3.5%
- camphene 2.8%
- linalool 2.5%
- camphor 2.4%
- sabinene 2.3%
- α-copaene 1.8%
- limonene 1.1%
- geranyl acetate 0.9%
- terpinen-4-ol 0.9%
- α-pinene 0.8%
- valencene 0.8%
- β-pinene 0.7%
- α-terpineol 0.6%
- β-caryophyllene 0.5%
- myrcene 0.2%
