= Francis Cyril Rose =

English painter (1909–1979)

Francis Cyril Rose (1909–1979), also Sir Francis, 4th Baronet of the Montreal Roses, was an English painter vigorously championed by Gertrude Stein. His wife Frederica, Lady Rose (1910–2002) became a well known travel writer, notably on Corsica, under the name of Dorothy Carrington.

Rose was born at Moor Park, Hertfordshire, England. He took up residence as an expatriate in Paris between 1929 and 1936, where he trained under Francis Picabia and José Maria Sert. Francis Rose got his beginning as a set painter for Diaghilev's Ballets Russes. He occasionally collaborated in his work with another English painter, and his sometime lover, Christopher Wood. In the 1930s he travelled with his future wife, Dorothy Carrington, in France, Italy, and North Africa.

In France, Rose became an intimate acquaintance of Gertrude Stein and Alice B. Toklas, the former helping to launch his painting career by commissioning several of his works (most notably a portrait of herself) for her own notable art collection. Her memorable utterance, "Rose is a rose is a rose is a rose" dates from 1913; however, long before her acquaintance with the artist, who would go on to have exhibits in Paris, London, and New York. He also worked as an illustrator for a cookbook by Toklas, The Alice B. Toklas Cookbook.

Rose married the writer Dorothy Carrington in 1942. Toklas was greatly enthusiastic about Rose's marriage to "Frederica" (Carrington), noting that the marriage had done Rose "a world of good." However, Rose was a noted homosexual and the marriage eventually foundered; they divorced in 1966. Rose spent his final years in penury, helped along by friends, among them Cecil Beaton. Some of Rose's paintings today form part of the Yale University Art Gallery (Stein-Toklas collection) and the Fine Arts Museums of San Francisco. In 1961, he published a memoir, Saying Life.

He made a brief appearance as "Lord Chaos" in Kenneth Anger's film Lucifer Rising (1972).

In 1988, a retrospective exhibition was held in London by England & Co gallery.

== Arms ==
Coat of arms of Francis Cyril Rose
Crest A harp Or stringed Argent. Escutcheon Or a boar’s head couped Gules between three water bougets Sable on a chief of the second as many maple leaves of the first. Motto Audeo, Constant and True

Baronetage of the United Kingdom
Preceded by Cyril Rose	Baronet (of Montreal); 1915–1979	Succeeded by Julian Rose
