= Elizabeth Rose, Lady of Kilravock =

Scottish literary critic and author

Elizabeth Rose, 19th Baroness of Kilravock (8 March 1747 – 1 November 1815) was an eighteenth-century Scottish literary critic and author.

== Life ==
Elizabeth Rose was born on 8 March 1747 in Kilravock, Scotland. She was the daughter of Hugh Rose, 17th Baron of Kilravock, and Elizabeth Clephane.

She was educated with her brothers, and entirely by men. She played the violin like her male counterparts, with the instrument supported against her shoulder. Her uncle, John Clephane, advised her "Reading and writing and playing on the spinet is all very well ... The two first deserve great application. The spinet, too has its merit ... methinks music is well as an amusement, but not as a study."

In 1779 she married Dr Hugh Rose of Broadley, who died two years later, and they had two children. After the death of her brother, the 18th Baron of Kilravock, and a five-year long contest over succession rights, she was granted title to most of the estates, including Kilravock. In 1788 she became the 19th Baroness of Kilravock and moved into Kilravock Castle.

She was an avid reader and possibly the best-documented eighteenth-century Scottish woman reader. In the years 1775–1780 alone she read 217 books. Reading was intended to influence her own moral improvement and to prepare her for the world into which she had suddenly been thrust due to the premature deaths of her father, her brothers and her husband.

She "was the choice companion, the leader of all cheerful amusements, the humorous story-teller, the clever mimic, the very soul of society". Robert Burns described her as "a true chieftain's wife, a daughter of Clephane", with "sterling sense, warm heart, strong passions, honest pride, all in an uncommon degree..."

She died on 1 November 1815. As she had requested, she was buried in the old [St. Mary's] chapel of Geddes with her coffin resting on birch trees cut from the Kilravock estate. Her son, Hugh, succeeded her as the 20th Baron of Kilvarock.

== Career ==
She was not the first very literary lady of the North, but her literature was not her greatest recommendation.

— Lachlan Shaw

=== Critic ===
Rose developed a literary reputation mainly because of her "indiscriminate and voracious reading". This marked her out "in a country where there was little learning in either sex". She shared her reading with others as she actively sought to cultivate a specific philosophy of reading in the next generation of female readers. Her great friend was Euphemia Russel, the mother of Cosmo Innes, and she moved in extensive circles.

Her reputation was far reaching. By the end of the century, she was well enough known for Anne Grant, who had never met her, to take Helen Dunbar's report of Rose's praise of her manuscript verse as significant encouragement in Grant's decision to publish her work. Grant described Rose's "elegant critisms" as "an excellent cork jacket" to keep her afloat as she ventured into the swampy world of publication.

Rose composed verses but merely for private consumption within her reading circle.

Her own style of writing…was not natural, and she has scarcely written anything worthy of being preserved for its intrinsic qualities - Hew Rose

She became an author by providence rather than design. Her commonplace books and correspondence are her well-known works.

=== Commonplace Books ===
She kept a journal from 1771 until 1815. Within these journals she recorded every book she read and collected passages from those books in a series of voluminous commonplace books. They also included other things she valued or needed. She kept financial records of estate business, alongside her annual reading lists of literature, philosophy, history, and natural science.

In her commonplace book, Poems, Rose excerpted poetry written by Samuel Johnson, Horace, Henry Mackenzie, and others, editing and revising their poetry to suit her own sense of poetics. And on her personal copy of Mary Robinson’s A Letter to the Women of England, on the Injustice of Mental Subordination, Rose made significant additions to the "List of British Female Literary Characters". She abridged David Hume's The History of England in its entirety, including Tobias Smollett's Continuation. And in her final commonplace book she transcribed at length a sequence of James Beattie's attack on Hume's scepticism.

At least 10 of her commonplace books are still in existence. Although some argue that only nine of them are attributable to Rose.

=== Correspondence ===
She was a prolific letter writer and she is now best known for her correspondence with her cousin Henry Mackenzie. Mackenzie wrote Rose 127 letters spanning the years 1768 to 1815. These, or extracts from them, were published in Letters to Elizabeth Rose of Kilravock on literature events and people 1768–1815. Amongst other things, the letters show that Mackenzie shared excerpts from his books and asked her for her opinion on the novel as he was writing it. Having sent her chapters from A Man of Feeling, Mackenzie commented: "I am proud of having drawn a female character so much to your liking". They did not always agree on the position of women, in another letter he wrote: "You are hard on me for my idea of inferiority in your sex."

Mackenzie gave Robert Burns a letter of introduction to Rose before Burns’ Highland tour in 1787. During one of Burns’ visits with Rose he was entertained by Rose's niece, who sang two Highland airs. At Burns request, Rose wrote down and sent these songs to him. In 1796 one of these songs was published in A Collection of Entirely Original Strathspey Reels, Marches, Quick Steps &c. titled as "Mrs. Rose of Kilravock's Strathspey".

Peerage of Scotland
Preceded by Hugh Rose	Baron of Kilravock; 1782–1815	Succeeded by Hugh Rose
