= Cradlehall =

Residential area of Inverness, Scotland

Coordinates: 57°28′29″N 4°9′41″W

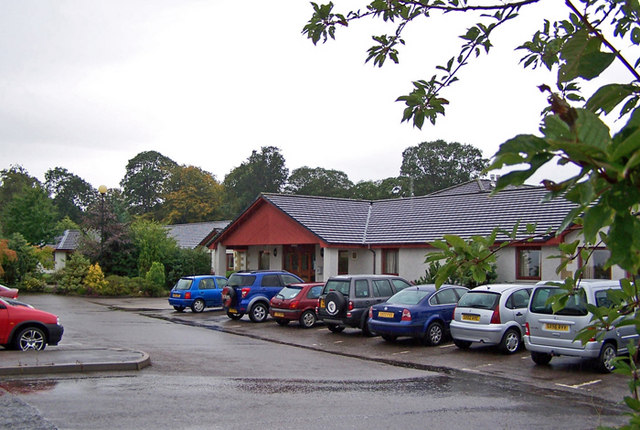
Cradlehall Nursing Home, Inverness. The home, in Cradlehall Court, is run by the Southern Cross Healthcare Group. It caters for 50 residents, each having a private en-suite room.

Cradlehall was originally the name given to the hall built by Major William Caulfeild, later known as Cradlehall Farmhouse. The name "Cradle" supposedly comes from a pulley-operated lift (called a cradle) that was used to hoist drunken guests up to their rooms after they'd had too much red wine.

Today it is a residential area in the east of Inverness, Scotland. In addition to housing, Cradlehall has a business park and a number of small businesses. The area was expanded recently with the development of Kessock View.
