= Culloden, Highland =

Coordinates: 57.489°N 4.135°W

Culloden: Scottish Gaelic: Cùil Lodair
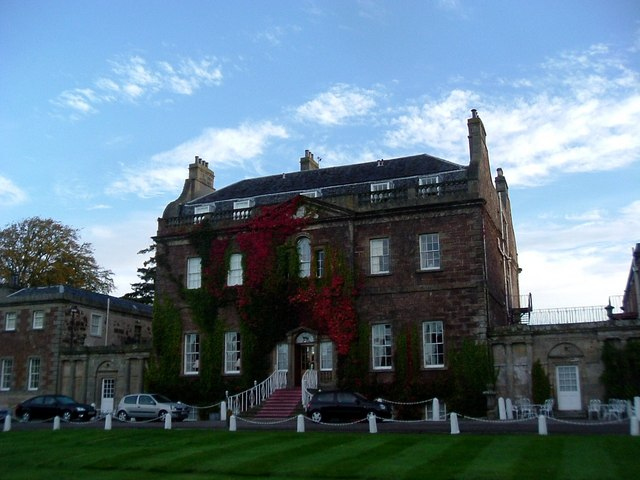
- Culloden House, 2004

- Location within the Inverness area
- Population: 3,830 (2020)
- OS grid reference: NH721463
- Council area: Highland
- Country: Scotland
- Sovereign state: United Kingdom
- Post town: Inverness
- Postcode district: IV2
- Police: Scotland
- Fire: Scottish
- Ambulance: Scottish
- UK Parliament: Inverness, Skye and West Ross-shire

Culloden (/kəˈlɒdən/; from Scottish Gaelic Cùl Lodain, "back of the small pond"; modern Gaelic Cùil Lodair) is a village three miles (five kilometres) east of Inverness, Scotland and the surrounding area. 3 mi (5 km) east of the village is Drumossie Moor, site of the Battle of Culloden.

== History ==
Culloden village was originally made up of estate houses attached to Culloden House. Historic buildings include Culloden House itself, which is now a hotel, the Culloden stables, now rebuilt as holiday homes, and the historic tithe barn which is now the Barn Church. Additional interesting buildings nearby include the Loch Lann Kennels, the Doocot and the ice house. In the 1960s an area near the historic village was drained for a council housing project, including Culloden Stores, Culloden Academy and Duncan Forbes Primary School, named after the Forbeses of Culloden, who owned Culloden House from 1626 to 1897. More recent private housing developments have since grown up around it. Culloden House is now an hotel.

The parish of Culloden includes three other communities: Balloch /bəˈlɒx/, Smithton and Westhill. Like Culloden, Balloch is a village of some antiquity. Smithton and Westhill are post-war housing developments.

== Battlefield of Culloden ==
Today, the battlefield of Culloden is under the care of the National Trust for Scotland, and its visitors' centre is a huge tourist attraction. The National Trust for Scotland has built a visitor centre that includes an interactive battle experience with an immersion film battle room. The visitor centre was officially opened to the public on 16 April 2008 and received 209,011 visitors in 2019. The Cairns of Clava, a group of Bronze Age burial mounds, are located at Balnauran of Clava, about 1 mi (2 km) south-east of the battlefield.

== Clootie well ==
Apart from the battlefield, the most notable site in the surrounding area is the "clootie well", in Culloden Woods, where brightly coloured rags are hung as offerings from people wishing to be cured of ailments. This well was traditionally visited on the first Sunday in May. Until the early 1970s, this pilgrimage was well attended with 'buses laid on to cater for the crowds. The practice of visiting on a specific day has declined sharply in recent years. A similar, and better known, well is near Munlochy. This tradition may be based on Celtic ceremonies, involving votive offerings to water spirits.
