= Julian Rose =

British businessman (born 1947)

Sir Julian Rose
- Born: March 1947; Hardwick Estate, England
- Known for: Promotion of organic farming
- Title: Baronet of Montreal; Baronet of Hardwick House

Sir Julian Day Rose, 5th and 4th Baronet (born March 1947) is a British aristocrat and exponent of organic farming. He changed the Hardwick Estate in South Oxfordshire to conform with the standards of organic farming in 1975. Rose succeeded to two baronetcies that were both under the name Rose.

== Arms ==
Coat of arms of Julian Rose
Crest A harp Or stringed Argent. Escutcheon Or a boar’s head couped Gules between three water bougets Sable on a chief of the second as many maple leaves of the first. Motto Audeo, Constant and True

Baronetage of the United Kingdom
Preceded by Francis Cyril Rose	Baronet (of Montreal); 1979–present	Incumbent
Preceded by Charles Rose	Baronet (of Hardwick House); 1966–present	Incumbent
