= Ross-shire (UK Parliament constituency) =

Parliamentary constituency in the United Kingdom, 1801–1832

- Former county constituency for the House of Commons
- Subdivision: Ross-shire

1708–1832
- Seats: One
- Created from: Ross-shire
- Replaced by: Ross & Cromarty

Ross-shire was a Scottish county constituency of the House of Commons of the Parliament of Great Britain from 1708 to 1801 and of the Parliament of the United Kingdom from 1801 to 1832.

== Creation ==
The British parliamentary constituency was created in 1708 following the Acts of Union, 1707 and replaced the former Parliament of Scotland shire constituency of Ross-shire

== History ==
The constituency elected one Member of Parliament (MP) by the first past the post system until the seat was abolished for the 1832 general election. In 1832 it was merged with Cromartyshire to form Ross and Cromarty.

== Members of Parliament ==
Election	Member	Party
1708	Hugh Rose	
1710	Charles Rosse	Independent Whig
1722	Alexander Urquhart	
1727	Charles Rosse	
1733	John Munro	
1734	Hugh Rose	
1741	Charles Ross	
1746	Sir Harry Munro, 7th Baronet	Whig
1747	Kenneth Mackenzie, Lord Fortrose	
1761	James Stuart-Mackenzie	
1780	John Mackenzie	
1784	Francis Mackenzie	
1790	William Adam	Whig
1794	Francis Mackenzie	
1796	Sir Charles Lockhart-Ross, 7th Baronet	
1806	Alexander Mackenzie-Fraser	
1809	Hugh Innes	
1812	William Frederick Mackenzie	
1814	Charles Mackenzie Fraser	
1818	Thomas Mackenzie	
1822	Sir James Wemyss Mackenzie, 5th Baronet	Tory
1831	James Alexander Stewart-Mackenzie	Whig
1832	constituency abolished	
