= Kilravock Castle =

Castle in Highland, Scotland

Coordinates: 57°31′10″N 3°58′56″W

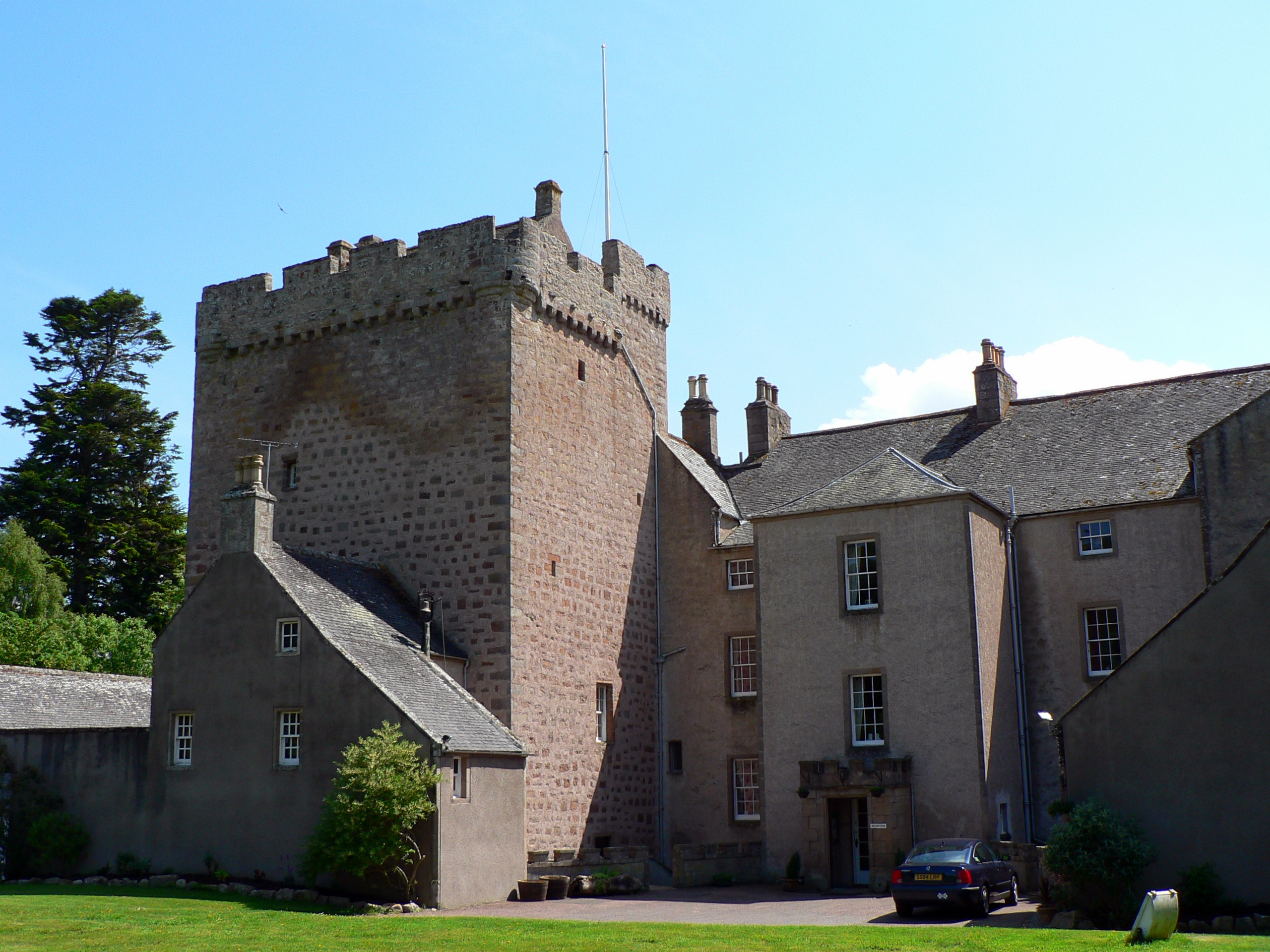
Kilravock Castle

Kilravock Castle (pronounced Kilrawk) is located near the village of Croy, between Inverness and Nairn, in the council area of Highland, Scotland. It was begun around 1460 and has been the seat of the Clan Rose since that time. The castle is a composite of a 15th-century tower house and several later additions. The original name for the castle was Cill Rathaig; Scottish Gaelic meaning "church at the small circular fort".

== History ==
The lands were owned by the Boscoe family and it passed via marriage of Andrew Boscoe to his wife Elizabeth Bissett of the Bissett family in the 12th century, after Bosco's death his widow then deposed the lands via marriage of their daughter Mary Boscoe to Hugh II de Ros of the Rose family in the 13th century. In 1293 the Roses were created Baron of Kilravock by John Balliol.

Its keep dates from around 1460, when the then Baron of Kilravock was granted a licence to build by the Lord of the Isles. This was extended in the 17th century, with the addition of a square stair tower, and the south range. The north and west sides of the quadrangle were added later. Mary, Queen of Scots, was received at the castle in 1562. A blacksmith in Elgin called George Robertson made a new iron yett for the great tower at Kilravock in February 1568.

Prince Charles Edward Stuart was entertained four days before the battle of Culloden. His enemy, the Duke of Cumberland, visited soon after the battle, and Robert Burns came here in September 1787. It is a Category A listed building, and is no longer occupied by the Rose Clan. The Castle is no longer part of the Rose Clan estate, in 1984 the Castle was transferred to a charitable Christian Trust. It was operated as bed and breakfast accommodation for a while, but is no longer open to the public.

== The Rose family ==
Kilravock Castle has been continuously owned by the Roses, a family of Norman origin. They settled at Kilravock in 1293, since which date child has succeeded parent without the interposition of a collateral heir, an instance of direct descent unique in Scottish history.

Moreover, many Roses have borne the Christian name of Hugh, and only one attained to a higher social rank than that of laird. The Chief of the Clan Rose, Anna Elizabeth Emily Guillemard Rose, 25th of Kilravock died peacefully, at Nairn on 9 December 2012, aged 88 years. The Lord Lyon recognized David Hugh Heriot Baird Rose (27 Feb 1946- ), the nephew of Elizabeth Rose as Chief of Clan Rose and the 26th Baron of Kilravock in June 2013.
