= List of counties of Scotland 1890–1975 =

This is a list of counties of Scotland created by the Local Government (Scotland) Act 1889 and abolished in 1975 by the Local Government (Scotland) Act 1973. The list includes the county town, area, and population density.

== Counties ==
County	County town	Alternative forms and Gaelic name	Area (acres)	Area (km^{2})	Population	Population density (per km^{2})
Inverness-shire	Inverness		2,695,094	10,915.13	89,655	8.21
Argyll	Lochgilphead	Argyllshire; Argyle; Earra-Ghaidheal	2,067,034	8,364.98	59,777	7.15
Ross and Cromarty	Dingwall	Ross-shire	1,977,254	8,007.88	58,284	7.28
Perthshire	Perth		1,586,577	6,425.63	127,104	19.78
Sutherland	Dornoch		1,297,914	5,276.07	13,055	2.47
Aberdeenshire	Aberdeen		1,246,585	5,172.55	150,703	29.14
Ayrshire	Ayr		724,239	2,930.95	361,248	123.25
Dumfriesshire	Dumfries		688,067	2,784.56	88,215	31.68
Kirkcudbrightshire	Kirkcudbright	The Stewartry	574,024	2,324.79	27,369	11.77
Angus	Forfar	Forfarshire	540,352	2,186.77	97,312	44.50
Lanarkshire	Hamilton (historically Lanark)		535,605	2,169.20	626,787	288.95
Caithness	Wick	Gallaibh	438,833	1,775.93	27,792	15.65
Roxburghshire	Jedburgh		425,564	1,725.24	41,960	24.32
Banffshire	Banff		403,054	1,631.14	43,500	26.67
Zetland	Lerwick	Shetland, Sealltainn, Hjaltiland	c.3,523.37	1,425.85	17,331	12.15
Fife	Cupar	Fifeshire, Fiobha	322,878	1,306.67	327,126	250.35
Wigtownshire	Wigtown	The Shire	311,984	1,262.58	27,337	21.65
Moray	Elgin	Morayshire, Elginshire, Moireabh	304,931	1,234.97	51,502	41.70
Berwickshire	Duns (anciently Berwick-upon-Tweed, and then Greenlaw)		292,535	1,183.84	20,778	17.55
Stirlingshire	Stirling		288,349	1,166.90	208,958	179.07
Kincardineshire	Stonehaven (historically Kincardine)	The Mearns, A' Mhaoirne	244,428	989.93	26,066	26.33
Orkney	Kirkwall	Arcaibh, Orkneyjar	c.240,848	934.67	17,082	18.28
Peeblesshire	Peebles		222,240	900.07	13,675	15.19
Midlothian	Edinburgh	Edinburghshire	203,354	823.58	142,213	172.68
Selkirkshire	Selkirk		171,209	692.85	20,868	30.12
East Lothian	Haddington	Haddingtonshire	171,044	692.73	55,908	80.71
Dunbartonshire	Dumbarton	Dumbartonshire	154,467	625.11	237,540	380.00
Renfrewshire	Renfrew		143,829	578.00	362,130	626.52
Bute	Rothesay	Buteshire	139,711	565.39	13,309	23.54
Nairnshire	Nairn		104,251	422.21	11,050	26.17
West Lothian	Linlithgow	Linlithgowshire	76,859	311.03	108,484	348.79
Kinross-shire	Kinross		52,025	210.70	6,423	30.48
Clackmannanshire	Alloa (historically Clackmannan)		34,838	140.99	45,544	323.03

== Cities ==
Historically cities were parts of larger counties. Edinburgh was in Midlothian, Aberdeen in Aberdeenshire, and Glasgow in Lanarkshire (although parts of greater Glasgow extended into other counties, e.g. Dunbartonshire and Renfrewshire).

County	County town	Alternative forms and Gaelic name	Area (acres)	Area (km^{2})	Population	Population density (per km^{2})
City of Glasgow	Glasgow	Glaschu, Glesca, Glasgie	34,647	140.21	897,484	6,401.00
City of Edinburgh	Edinburgh	Dun Eideann, Embra, Edina, Dunedin, Auld Reekie	32,415	131.17	453,585	3,457.99
City of Dundee	Dundee	Dùn Dè	12,229	49.48	182,204	3,682.33
City of Aberdeen	Aberdeen	Obar Dheathain, Aiberdein	16,715	67.64	182,071	2,691.77

== See also ==
- Counties of Scotland
- List of counties of Scotland by area in 1951
- List of counties of Scotland by population in 1951
- List of counties of Scotland by population in 1971
- List of Scottish counties by highest point
- List of Scottish council areas by area
- List of Scottish council areas by highest point
