= Lists of counties =

This is a list of counties in various countries, sorted by continent and then country.

== By country ==
=== Africa ===
- Kenya
- Liberia
- South Africa
- Nigeria
- Tanzania
- Lesotho
- Niger
- Mozambique
- Congo
- Zimbabwe
- Egypt

=== Asia ===
- China
- Iran
- North Korea
- South Korea

=== Europe ===
- Albania
- Croatia
- Denmark
- Hungary
  - Counties of Hungary (1000–1920)
- Ireland
- Lithuania
- Norway
- Poland
  - By voivodeships
- Romania
- Sweden
- United Kingdom
  - England
  - Scotland
    - List of counties of Scotland by population in 1951
    - List of counties of Scotland by population in 1971
  - Wales
  - Northern Ireland

=== North America ===
- Canada
  - List of regional county municipalities and equivalent territories in Quebec
- United States

=== Oceania ===
- New Zealand

== Former counties ==
- Counties of Tasmania
- List of former counties of Quebec
- List of former counties of Manitoba
- Former counties of Ontario
- List of administrative divisions of the Kingdom of Hungary
- List of counties of the Kingdom of Hungary located in Slovakia
- Preserved counties of Wales
- List of former United States counties
