= List of listed buildings in Ardclach, Highland =

This is a list of listed buildings in the parish of Ardclach in Highland, Scotland.

== List ==
Name	Location	Date listed	Grid ref. (Note: Sometimes known as OSGB36, the grid reference (where provided) is based on the British national grid reference system used by the Ordnance Survey. • "Guide to National Grid". Ordnance Survey. • "Get-a-map". Ordnance Survey.)	Geo-coordinates	Notes	LB number (Note: Historic Environment Scotland assign a unique alphanumeric identifier to each designated site in Scotland, for listed buildings this always begins with "LB", for example "LB12345".)	Image
1-6 (Inclusive) Ferness Village				57°28′57″N 3°43′54″W	Category B	5103	Upload Photo
Whitefold, Highland Boath Bridge Over Muckle Burn				57°28′42″N 3°50′27″W	Category B	5107	Upload another image
Coulmony House And Walled Garden				57°30′25″N 3°42′47″W	Category B	555	Upload Photo
Ardclach Old Manse Steading And Garden Wall				57°29′35″N 3°45′17″W	Category B	553	Upload another image
Dulsie Bridge (Over River Findhorn)				57°27′02″N 3°46′53″W	Category A	557	Upload another image See more images
Dulsie Farmhouse, Dulsie Bridge				57°27′06″N 3°46′51″W	Category C(S)	558	Upload another image
Ardclach Old Parish Church And Burial Ground				57°29′00″N 3°44′42″W	Category B	554	Upload another image See more images
Daltullich Bridge Over River Findhorn				57°31′05″N 3°41′39″W	Category B	556	Upload another image See more images
Ferness Village, Schoolhouse With School				57°28′59″N 3°43′53″W	Category C(S)	559	Upload Photo
Glenferness House				57°27′48″N 3°46′24″W	Category A	560	Upload Photo
Newton Of Belivat				57°30′21″N 3°44′38″W	Category C(S)	565	Upload Photo
Glenferness House Stables				57°27′52″N 3°46′28″W	Category B	561	Upload Photo
Ardclach Bell Tower				57°29′10″N 3°44′48″W	Category A	551	Upload another image See more images
Ardclach Parish Church (Church Of Scotland)				57°29′31″N 3°45′21″W	Category B	552	Upload Photo
Glenferness House Gate Lodge, Gate Piers And Entrance Gates				57°27′56″N 3°44′58″W	Category B	563	Upload another image
Glenferness House Walled Garden And Gardener's House				57°27′54″N 3°46′21″W	Category B	562	Upload Photo
Tomnagee, Farmhouse And Steading				57°32′03″N 3°44′29″W	Category B	566	Upload Photo
Logie Bridge, Ferness (Over River Findhorn)				57°29′39″N 3°44′15″W	Category A	564	Upload another image

== Key ==
The scheme for classifying buildings in Scotland is:

- Category A: "buildings of national or international importance, either architectural or historic; or fine, little-altered examples of some particular period, style or building type."
- Category B: "buildings of regional or more than local importance; or major examples of some particular period, style or building type, which may have been altered."
- Category C: "buildings of local importance; lesser examples of any period, style, or building type, as originally constructed or moderately altered; and simple traditional buildings which group well with other listed buildings."

In March 2016 there were 47,288 listed buildings in Scotland. Of these, 8% were Category A, and 50% were Category B, with the remaining 42% being Category C.

== See also ==
- List of listed buildings in Highland
