= John Baird Simpson =

Scottish geologist

Dr John Baird Simpson FRSE FGS (January 14, 1894 – June 28, 1960), was a Scottish geologist. He was President of the Edinburgh Geological Society 1950-52 and was awarded the Lyell Medal by the Geological Society of London in 1954.

== Life ==
Simpson was born on the Glenferness estate near Ardclach, Nairnshire, the son of Thomas Simpson, the estate manager. After schooling at Nairn Academy, he went to the University of Aberdeen, where he graduated with a BSc in Agriculture, in 1914.

At the outbreak of the First World War he joined the Royal Engineers, and was later commissioned in the Gordon Highlanders. He was wounded, and badly gassed, during active service in France. He returned to civilian life in 1918, and resumed his studies at the University of Aberdeen later that year, graduating in 1920 with a degree in Pure Science, with special distinction in Geology.

Later in 1920, he was appointed to the field staff of the Geological Survey in Scotland. He was promoted to Senior Geologist in 1932, and to District Geologist in 1945. He retired in 1954. His work with the Survey fell into two broad categories. He carried out a lot of the early earliest mapping of the Western Highlands and Islands of Scotland, including the Lewisian of Coll and Tiree, the Mesozoic sediments and Tertiary lavas of Morvern and Ardnamurchan, and the Moine Schists of Ardnamurchan, Sunart and South Morar. Some of his most important work concerned the Scottish Coalfields and their associated rocks, in Ayrshire, Dumfriesshire, Dumbartonshire, Lanarkshire and Midlothian, leading to significant upward revisions to reserves estimates. He mapped superficial deposits, in particular the boulder clays of Ayrshire, which led to new time-correlations of glacial events in Scotland and Scandinavia. Some of this work was submitted to the University of Aberdeen for his doctorate (DSc), which was conferred on him in 1933.

The other aspect of his work built on his early agricultural and botanical training, and he became a recognised authority on fossil pollen. In large part, this work was "private research", as opposed to "official", meaning that it was done in his spare time, not as part of his Survey duties. The work led to significant conclusions, though, and was published in journals such as the Transactions and Proceedings of the Royal Society of Edinburgh. He was elected a Fellow of the Society in 1932 his proposers being John Smith Flett, Murray Macgregor, James Ernest Richey and Robert Campbell. He was a contributor to the Geological Magazine, and the Transactions of the Edinburgh and Glasgow Geological Societies. He became a Fellow of the Geological Society of London in 1949. He was awarded the Clough Medal by the Edinburgh Geological Society, for the period 1953-4, and the Lyell Medal by the Geological Society of London, in 1954. Many undergraduates studying geology and, as part of their practical training having to interpret the Sanquhar sheet, in Southern Scotland, will have thanked him for the challenges set by his mapping this complex geological setting.

He retired in 1954 and died near his birthplace on 28 June 1960.

Two obituaries capture the character of the man nicely: "Johnnie Simpson was a man of exceptional kindliness, generosity and charm, loved by all of his friends ... [his professional] reputation was the result of a patient and selfless devotion to research worthy of the high traditions of Scottish natural science"; and "To be his companion on a Highland traverse was ... both an inspiration and memory to treasure. He possessed other qualities - an innate courtesy, forbearance, helpfulness and loyalty - which gained for him the affection of many friends and for which he will long be remembered ... the end came as he himself might surely have wished it to come. He was found lying peacefully by the banks of his beloved [River] Findhorn with his rod and line stretched out over its grey waters. The country laddie from Glenferness had travelled far and risen high but had come home at last."
