= Littlemill =

Coordinates: 57.53746°N 3.79199°W

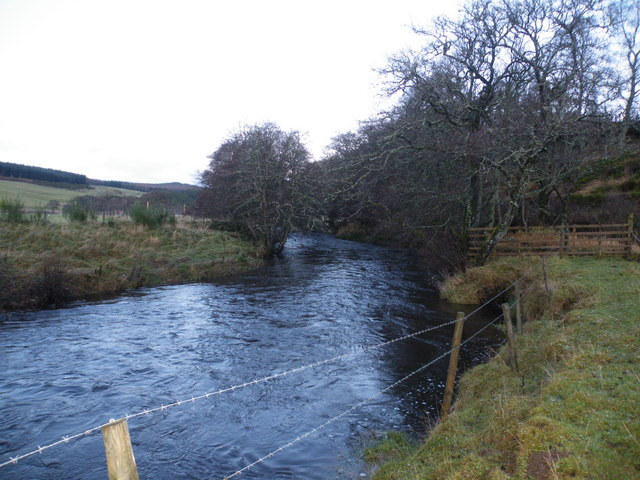
- River Nairn approaching Littlemill

- Location within the Nairn area
- Population: 35
- OS grid reference: NH928511
- Council area: Highland
- Country: Scotland
- Sovereign state: United Kingdom
- Post town: Nairn
- Postcode district: IV12 4
- Dialling code: 01667
- Police: Scotland
- Fire: Scottish
- Ambulance: Scottish

Littlemill is a village located close to Nairn in Nairnshire, Scottish Highlands and is in the Scottish council area of Highland.
