= Regoul =

Coordinates: 57.54586°N 3.81397°W

- Location within the Nairn area
- OS grid reference: NH915520
- Council area: Highland
- Country: Scotland
- Sovereign state: United Kingdom
- Post town: Nairn
- Postcode district: IV12 4
- Police: Scotland
- Fire: Scottish
- Ambulance: Scottish

Regoul is a small rural hamlet, located 4.5 miles south of Nairn, in Nairnshire, Scottish Highlands and is in the Scottish council area of Highland.
