= Culcharry =

Coordinates: 57.52845°N 3.89989°W

- Location within the Nairn area
- OS grid reference: NH863502
- Council area: Highland
- Country: Scotland
- Sovereign state: United Kingdom
- Post town: Nairn
- Postcode district: IV12 5
- Police: Scotland
- Fire: Scottish
- Ambulance: Scottish

Culcharry is a small residential settlement, close to the village of Cawdor and the hamlet of Brackla, lying 4 miles southwest of Nairn, in Nairnshire, Scottish Highlands and is in the Scottish council area of Highland.
