= Piperhill =

Coordinates: 57.536°N 3.89187°W

- Location within the Nairn area
- OS grid reference: NH868511
- Council area: Highland
- Country: Scotland
- Sovereign state: United Kingdom
- Post town: NAIRN
- Postcode district: IV12
- Police: Scotland
- Fire: Scottish
- Ambulance: Scottish

Piperhill is a village, located 4 miles (6.4 km) south of Nairn in Nairnshire, Scottish Highlands and is in the Scottish council area of Highland.
