= Ardclach =

Coordinates: 57.48583°N 3.74784°W

Ardclach: Scottish Gaelic: Àird Chlach
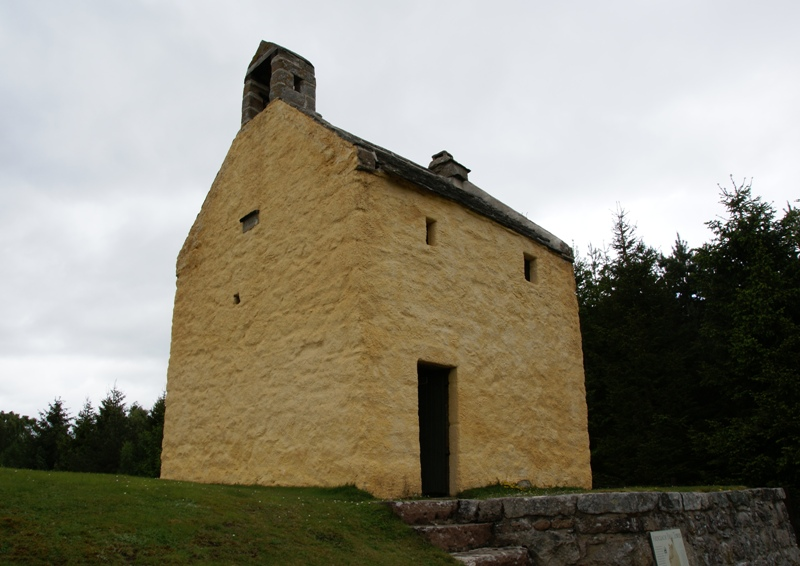
- Ardclach Bell Tower

- Location within the Nairn area
- OS grid reference: NH953453
- Council area: Highland
- Country: Scotland
- Sovereign state: United Kingdom
- Post town: NAIRN
- Postcode district: IV12
- Police: Scotland
- Fire: Scottish
- Ambulance: Scottish
- UK Parliament: Moray West, Nairn and Strathspey
- Scottish Parliament: Inverness and Nairn

Ardclach (Scottish Gaelic: Àird Chlach) is a small crofting hamlet, close to Glenferness in the Highland council area of Scotland. It is historically part of Nairnshire.

Dating to at least 1655, and now a Category A listed building, Ardclach Bell Tower is believed to be the only tower and belfry combination in Scotland.
