= List of archaeological sites in Nairnshire =

Location of Nairn within the Highland council area

This list of archaeological sites in Nairnshire comprises archaeological discoveries in Nairnshire providing context in relation to the dominant Royal Burgh of Nairn, Scotland.

Site/Item link	Period Range	OS Grid Reference	Distance from Nairn (mi) (NH 8800 5600)
Achareidh (Monument) (MHG6955)	300 AD to 900 AD	NH 8680 5639	0.78
Cairn - Carn Bad A'Churaich (Monument) (MHG7282)	4000 BC to 1 AD	NH 9426 3844	1.09
Chapel, Dunearn (Monument) (MHG7072)	1058 AD to 1900 AD	NH 9338 4087	1.34
Fort, Dunearn (Monument) (MHG7083)	550 BC to 900 AD	NH 9324 4068	1.37
Ring ditch, 100m NW of Howford (Monument) (MHG7301)	2400 BC to 560 AD	NH 8744 5384	1.39
Beaker - Easter Delnies (Monument) (MHG6948)	2400 BC to 551 BC	NH 8549 5620	1.57
Newlands of Delnies (Monument) (MHG7003)	1560 AD to 1900 AD	NH 8505 5469	2.01
Icehouse, Delnies (Building) (MHG43690)	1877 AD to 1877 AD	NH 84820 56590	2.01
Kinchyle (Monument) (MHG7016)	2400 BC to 551 BC	NH 8590 5310	2.22
Ring ditches, 700m WSW of Geddes House (Monument) (MHG7020)	2400 BC to 560 AD	NH 8767 5240	2.25
Hut circles 600m SE of Geddes House (Monument) (MHG7021)	2400 BC to 551 BC	NH 8884 5238	2.31
Milton of Kildrummie (Monument) (MHG7004)	1560 AD to 1900 AD	NH 8606 5279	2.33
Rait Castle (Monument) (MHG7030)	561 AD to 1900 AD	NH 8939 5251	2.34
Barrow cemetery, Knock Geddes (Monument) (MHG6996)	4000 BC to 560 AD	NH 8732 5222	2.39
Middens, Ardersier (Monument) (MHG6916)	8000 BC to 1900 AD	NH 8399 5600	2.49
Chapel, Dalnahiglish (Monument) (MHG7166)	1058 AD to 1559 AD	NH 9600 4400	2.60
Possible Stone Circle or Ring Cairn, Auldearn (Monument) (MHG7055)	2400 BC to 551 BC	NH 9246 5530	2.80
Kinsteary House, urn and beads (Monument) (MHG14358)	2400 BC to 551 BC	NH 9229 5414	2.91
Lochloy (Monument) (MHG7065)	561 AD to 1900 AD)	NH 9234 5798	2.96
Farmstead, Carn Na Caillich (Monument) (MHG7081)	1560 AD to 1900 AD	NH 9121 4266	3.07
Site of Polneach, Cawdor (Monument) (MHG7000)	1801 AD to 1941 AD	NH 8526 5187	3.08
Farmstead, Refuil (Monument) (MHG7078)	1560 AD to 1900 AD	NH 9067 4197	3.15
Kerb Cairn - Hill of Urchany (Monument) (MHG7024)	4000 BC to 551 BC	NH 8917 5100	3.19
Brackla Farm (Monument) (MHG6992)	1058 AD to 1559 AD	NH 8579 5120	3.28
Penick Castle, Little Penwick (Monument) (MHG7227)	1560 AD to 1900 AD	NH 9330 5536	3.32
Blackcastle (Monument) (MHG6979)	1560 AD to 1900	NH 8301 5405	3.33
Axes and flint tools, Slagachorrie (Monument) (MHG7192)	4000 BC to 551 BC	NH 9000 5100	3.35
Kebbuck Stone, Sunnyhillock (Monument) (MHG7034)	300 AD to 900 AD	NH 8256 5556	3.39
Kerb Cairn and Clearance Cairns - Hill of Urchany (Monument) (MHG7025)	4000 BC to 551 BC	NH 8928 5067	3.41
Clearance Cairn - Dalbuie (Monument) (MHG7255)	4000 BC to 560 AD	NH 8980 4069	3.45
Hut circles (4), Sunnyhillock (Monument) (MHG7032)	2400 BC to 551 BC	NH 8249 5513	3.47
Cairnfield - Shearleat (Monument) (MHG6968)	1250 BC to 1900 AD	NH 90488 42766	3.49
Cairnfield, Carn Na Caillich (Monument) (MHG7069)	1250 BC to 1900 AD	NH 90488 42766	3.49
Kerb Cairn - Arr Wood (Monument) (MHG7193)	4000 BC to 551 BC	NH 9163 5168	3.50
Inshoch Castle (Monument) (MHG7045)	1560 AD to 1900 AD	NH 9364 5669	3.53
Clearance cairns, Carn Na Caillich (Monument) (MHG40383)	2400 BC to 560 AD	NH 90973 43554	3.53
Carn Nan Clach Garbha (Monument) (MHG7177)	1560 AD to 1900 AD	NH 9365 3442	3.54
Standing stone (Chambered cairn), Balnaroid (Monument) (MHG6993)	4000 BC to 551 BC	NH 8573 5075	3.55
Cairn - Levrattich (Monument) (MHG7167)	4000 BC to 1 AD	NH 9447 4568	3.65
Dalbuie (Monument) (MHG6964)	2400 BC to 551 BC	NH 8943 4059	3.67
Possible Fort, Urchany Hill (Monument) (MHG6886)	550 BC to 1900 AD)	NH 8941 4995	3.86
Balnaglack Farm (Monument) (MHG6982)	300 AD to 1900 AD	NH 8320 5070	4.44
Shion Hillock Cairn (Monument) (MHG7169)	2400 BC to 551 BC	NH 9163 4978	4.47
Moyness Castle (Monument) (MHG7219)	1058 AD to 1559 AD	NH 9508 5379	4.61
Possible Clava-type Cairn - Little Urchany (Monument) (MHG7250)	2400 BC to 551 BC	NH 8665 4859	4.68
Kerb Cairn - Little Urchany (Monument) (MHG6878)	2400 BC to 551 BC	NH 8665 4856	4.70
Ring cairn, Mains of Moyness (Monument) (MHG7208)	2400 BC to 551 BC	NH 9527 5366	4.75
Cairns 1.1km SSW of Badnonan (Monument) (MHG7283)	4000 BC to 560 AD	NH 9140 3330	4.75
Clearance cairns, E of Allt Laoigh (Monument) (MHG7180)	4000 BC to 560 AD	NH 9210 3269	4.88
Carn Sgumain (Monument) (MHG6969)	2400 BC to 551 BC	NH 8719 4064	5.06
Possible Ring Cairn, Golford Cottages (Monument) (MHG7212)	2400 BC to 551 BC	NH 9615 5488	5.11
Clearance Cairn - Allt Na Leacainn (Monument) (MHG6966)	2400 BC to 560 AD	NH 8816 4399	5.11
Possible Ring Cairn, Golford Cottages (Monument) (MHG40207)	2400 BC to 551 BC)	NH 9616 5488	5.12
Ring cairn etc, Easter Clune (Monument) (MHG40206)	2400 BC to 551 BC	NH 9524 5161	5.26
Ring cairn etc, Easter Clune (Monument) (MHG7211)	2400 BC to 551 BC	NH 9524 5161	5.26
Carnoch Burn (Monument) (MHG7039)	2400 BC to 551 BC	NH 8682 4087	5.30
Carn A' Chrassie (Monument) (MHG6967)	2400 BC to 551 BC	NH 8672 4298	5.67
Cist burial, Daltulich (Monument) (MHG7172)	2400 BC to 560 AD	NH 9801 4863	5.70
Carn A' Chrasgie (Monument) (MHG7037)	1560 AD to 1900 AD	NH 8639 4230	5.74
Chapel, Daless (Monument) (MHG6873)	1058 AD to 1900 AD	NH 8608 3886	5.76
Kilravock Castle, chapel and dovecot (Building) (MHG7231)	561 AD to 1900 AD	NH 8140 4933	5.83
Carn A' Mhais Leathain (Monument) (MHG7038)	1560 AD to 1900 AD	NH 8590 4110	5.88
Kist Cairn - Glencairn (Monument) (MHG7216)	4000 BC to 551 BC	NH 9714 5314	5.95
Cairn, Lethen Bar (Monument) (MHG6863)	4000 BC to 551 BC	NH 9558 4946	5.96
St. Barevan's Church - Kirkton of Barevan (Monument) (MHG7043)	1058 AD to 1559 AD	NH 8368 4725	6.06
Cairnfield - Carn Maol (Monument) (MHG7252)	2400 BC to 900 AD	NH 8740 4600	6.21
Hut circles, Balmore (Monument) (MHG7254)	4000 BC to 560 AD	NH 8805 4600	6.21
Enclosure and Probable Clearance Cairns - Carn Maol (Monument) (MHG7257)	4000 BC to 560 AD	NH 8678 4531	6.28
Rehiran (Monument) (MHG6903)	1560 AD to 1900 AD	NH 8395 4619	6.59
Hut Circle - Braevall Wood (Monument) (MHG7239)	550 BC to 560 AD	NH 8444 4590	6.65
Hut circle, Loch of Boath Wood (Monument) (MHG7253)	2400 BC to 551 BC	NH 8858 4530	6.66
Braevall Wood (Monument) (MHG44310)	4000 BC to 560 AD	NH 8442 4585	6.69
Braevall Wood (Monument) (MHG44309)	4000 BC to 560 AD)	NH 8448 4578	6.72
Clunas (Monument) (MHG7256)	2400 BC to 551 BC	NH 8714 4702	6.74
Hut Circles - Carn Maol (Monument) (MHG7248)	4000 BC to 560 AD	NH 8725 4500	6.85
Clearance Cairn - Clunas Reservoir (Monument) (MHG7251)	4000 BC to 560 AD	NH 8620 4620	6.88
Clunas Reservoir (Monument) (MHG7259)	2400 BC to 551 BC	NH 8577 4557	6.90
Chapel, Lethen (Monument) (MHG7188)	1058 AD to 1900 AD	NH 9300 5100	7.06
Caochan Glac Diollaid (Monument) (MHG7258)	2400 BC to 551 BC	NH 8510 4567	7.29
Cairn - Braevall Wood (Monument) (MHG7238)	2400 BC to 551 BC	NH 8461 4566	7.55
Middle Rattick (Monument) (MHG6972)	1560 AD to 1900 AD	NH 8185 4530	7.67
Allt Dearg (Monument) (MHG6914)	1560 AD to 1900 AD	NH 8190 4520	7.71
Building, Refouble (Monument) (MHG7186)	1560 AD to 1900 AD	NH 9529 3987	7.71
Cairnfield - Braevall Wood (Monument) (MHG7236)	2400 BC to 560 AD	NH 8458 4616	7.72
Chapel & Graveyard, Little Urchany (Monument) (MHG6885)	1058 AD to 1900 AD	NH 8643 4878	7.81
Allt Dearg (Monument) (MHG6911)	1560 AD to 1900 AD	NH 8159 4506	7.88
Cairn - Hill of Urchany (Monument) (MHG41425)	4000 BC to 560 AD	NH 8916 5100	7.90
Allt Dearg (Monument) (MHG6962)	1560 AD to 1900 AD	NH 8168 4488	7.95
Hut circle, Carn Na Caillich (Monument) (MHG7073)	2400 BC to 551 BC	NH 91135 43424	8.05
Ardclach Bell Tower (Building) (MHG7175)	1560 AD to 1900 AD	NH 9538 4533	8.06
Allt Dearg (Monument) (MHG6959)	1560 AD to 1900 AD	NH 8142 4467	8.14
Dun, Hill of Urchany (Monument) (MHG7023)	550 BC to 560 AD	NH 8951 5169	8.18
Barrow Cemetery - Kerrowaird (Monument) (MHG2925)	550 BC to 900 AD	NH 7641 4972	8.19
Castle Findlay (Monument) (MHG7022)	2400 BC to 551 BC	NH 8896 5146	8.21
Castle Findlay (Monument) (MHG6994)	550 BC to 900 AD	NH 8880 5140	8.22
Clearance Cairn - Rehiran (Monument) (MHG7237)	4000 BC to 560 AD	NH 8365 4621	8.23
Clearance Cairns, Arr Wood (Monument) (MHG7190)	2400 BC to 551 BC	NH 9220 5279	8.25
Hanover (Monument) (MHG7221)	2400 BC to 560 AD	NH 9704 5316	8.33
Motte, Cantraydoune (Monument) (MHG2933)	1058 AD to 1559 AD	NH 7888 4609	8.37
Burial ground - St. Barevan's Church, Kirkton of Barevan (Monument) (MHG31375)	1058 AD to 1900 AD	NH 8368 4725	8.55
Kiln barn, Carn Na Caillich (Monument) (MHG41802)	1560 AD to 1900 AD	NH 91257 42635	8.55
Shearleat (Monument) (MHG6965)	4000 BC to 560 AD	NH 8673 4227	8.57
Site of cairnfield, Carna Caillich (Monument) (MHG7071)	2400 BC to 560 AD	NH 9067 4244	8.59
Cist w finds, Inchnacaorach (Monument) (MHG6881)	2400 BC to 551 BC	NH 8520 4940	8.62
Burial cists, Auchindown (Monument) (MHG40868)	2400 BC to 551 BC	NH 8380 4789	8.71
Burial cists, Auchindown (Monument) (MHG7040)	2400 BC to 551 BC	NH 8380 4789	8.71
Easter Rattick (Monument) (MHG6912)	1560 AD to 1900 AD	NH 8223 4523	8.77
Hut circle, Cantraydoune (Monument) (MHG14265)	2400 BC to 551 BC	NH 7849 4556	8.77
Cairns, Broomton (Monument) (MHG7218)	2400 BC to 551 BC	NH 9650 5400	8.81
Chapel, Knockoudie Wood (Monument) (MHG7191)	1058 AD to 1559 AD	NH 9100 5340	8.82
Cists etc, Black Hillock, Mains of Moyness (Monument) (MHG7222)	2400 BC to 551 BC	NH 9539 5415	8.87
Enclosure - Rait Castle (Monument) (MHG7011)	2400 BC to 900 AD	NH 8924 5296	8.96
Enclosure & Cropmarks, Meikle Kildrummie (Monument) (MHG7017)	2400 BC to 900 AD	NH 8924 5296	8.96
Geddes, St. Mary's Chapel and Graveyard (Monument) (MHG7031)	1058 AD to 1900 AD	NH 8882 5286	9.02
Princess' Stone, Glenferness (Monument) (MHG7082)	561 AD to 1057 AD	NH 9365 4260	9.03
Cist, Wester Golford (Monument) (MHG7206)	2400 BC to 560 AD	NH 9506 5457	9.13
Cist, Wester Golford (Monument) (MHG40874)	2400 BC to 560 AD	NH 9506 5457	9.13
Dun Evan (Monument) (MHG6906)	2400 BC to 900 AD	NH 8277 4757	9.13
Cist, Wester Golford (E) (Monument) (MHG40875)	2400 BC to 560 AD	NH 9533 5468	9.20
Cist, Wester Golford (E) (Monument) (MHG7207)	2400 BC to 560 AD	NH 9533 5468	9.20
Enclosure Nr Brackla Farm (Monument) (MHG7309)	550 BC to 215 AD	NH 8577 5133	9.26
Garblies (Monument) (MHG7205)	2400 BC to 551 BC	NH 9344 5490	9.41
Cairn, Kinsteary (Monument) (MHG7194)	4000 BC to 551 BC	NH 9311 5485	9.41
Chapel, Foynesfield (Monument) (MHG6995)	1058 AD to 1900 AD	NH 8920 5380	9.44
Cists & Urn, Kinsteary (Monument) (MHG40873)	2400 BC to 551 BC	NH 9243 5484	9.47
Cists & Urn, Kinsteary (Monument) (MHG7195)	2400 BC to 551 BC	NH 9243 5484	9.47
Cist, Meadowfield, Auldearn (Monument) (MHG7046)	2400 BC to 551 BC	NH 9312 5499	9.49
Coffin & Cairn, Muckle Burn (Monument) (MHG7067)	2400 BC to 551 BC	NH 9701 5524	9.61
Coffin & Cairn, Muckle Burn (Monument) (MHG42122)	2400 BC to 551 BC	NH 9701 5525	9.61
Banchor (Monument) (MHG7075)	2400 BC to 551 BC	NH 9022 4058	9.68
Wester Dulsie (Monument) (MHG7076)	1560 AD to 1900 AD	NH 9249 4100	9.73
Balnaclach (Monument) (MHG6963)	1560 AD to 1900 AD	NH 8877 4018	9.84
Cinerary Urn, Auldearn (Monument) (MHG7059)	2400 BC to 551 BC	NH 9189 5540	9.88
Burgh, Auldearn (Monument) (MHG7047)	561 AD to 1057 AD	NH 9194 5547	9.92
Little Banchor & Lime kiln (Monument) (MHG7079)	1560 AD to 1900 AD)	NH 9020 4013	9.95
Knockandhu (Monument) (MHG6874)	1560 AD to 1900 AD	NH 8777 3992	9.99
Galcantray (Monument) (MHG7243)	1058 AD to 1900 AD	NH 8100 4730	10.01
Cist w finds, Nairnside (Monument) (MHG6980)	2400 BC to 551 BC	NH 8290 5020	10.02
Cawdor Ring Ditch (Monument) (MHG6990)	2400 BC to 560 AD	NH 8469 5210	10.05
Cairn - Hangman's Hill (Monument) (MHG7028)	2400 BC to 551 BC	NH 8551 5289	10.12
Enclosure (Roman) Holme Rose (Monument) (MHG6892)	79 AD to 1559 AD	NH 8100 4830	10.31
Tomlachlan (Monument) (MHG7181)	1560 AD to 1900 AD	NH 9319 3950	10.75
Easter Lochend (Monument) (MHG6977)	2400 BC to 900 AD	NH 8430 5328	10.77
Hut Circle - Refouble (Monument) (MHG7187)	4000 BC to 560 AD	NH 9544 3999	10.97
Battanmaceachain (Monument) (MHG7182)	1560 AD to 1900 AD	NH 9054 3848	11.00
Cantraydoune 4 + 5 (Monument) (MHG6867)	4000 BC to 560 AD	NH 7839 4530	11.03
Kerb Cairn - Daless (Monument) (MHG7264)	4000 BC to 551 BC	NH 8619 3831	11.05
Cantraydoune 2 + 3 (Monument) (MHG6864)	2400 BC to 551 BC	NH 7817 4506	11.12
Cairn - Cantraydoune (Monument) (MHG6872)	4000 BC to 551 BC	NH 7819 4557	11.20
Flint Implements - Kingsteps Quarry (Find Spot) (MHG6947)	8000 BC to 4001 BC	NH 8997 5711	11.21
Cist - Kingsteps Quarry (Monument) (MHG7223)	2400 BC to 551 BC	NH 9010 5719	11.23
Possible Cairn, Hill of Aitnoch (Monument) (MHG7165)	4000 BC to 1 AD	NH 9710 4029	11.28
Crannog, Loch of the Clans, Bemuchyle (Monument) (MHG6991)	2 AD to 560 AD	NH 8257 5297	11.35
Cist with Inhumation, Carnach House (Monument) (MHG6945)	2400 BC to 1501 BC	NH 8534 5554	11.53
Deserted township, Mavistoun (Monument) (MHG7066)	1560 AD to 1900 AD	NH 9300 5900	11.97
Rhilean Barn 1 (Monument) (MHG6875)	1560 AD to 1900 AD	NH 8943 3670	12.02
Rhilean Burn 2 (Monument) (MHG7262)	1560 AD to 1900 AD	NH 8943 3670	12.02
Leonach (Monument) (MHG7179)	1560 AD to 1900 AD	NH 9077 3400	13.78
Alltlaoigh (Monument) (MHG7176)	1560 AD to 1900 AD	NH 9222 3289	14.60
