= Clephanton =

Hamlet in the Scottish Highlands

Coordinates: 57.53186°N 3.96006°W

- Location within the Nairn area
- OS grid reference: NH827507
- Council area: Highland
- Country: Scotland
- Sovereign state: United Kingdom
- Post town: NAIRN
- Postcode district: IV12
- Police: Scotland
- Fire: Scottish
- Ambulance: Scottish

Clephanton is a small hamlet 2 miles south-east from Ardersier and 7 miles south-west of Nairn in Inverness-shire, Scottish Highlands. It is in the Scottish council area of Highland. Some notable features near the settlement include the Kilravock Castle and the Nairn River.
