= List of counties of Scotland by area in 1951 =

This is a list of counties in Scotland, ordered by area as at the 1951 census.

Rank	County	Area
1	Inverness-shire	2,695,094 acres (10,907 km^{2})
2	Argyllshire	1,990,521 acres (8,055 km^{2})
3	Ross and Cromarty	1,977,248 acres (8,002 km^{2})
4	Perthshire	1,595,804 acres (6,458 km^{2})
5	Sutherland	1,297,913 acres (5,252 km^{2})
6	Aberdeenshire	1,263,300 acres (5,112 km^{2})
7	Ayrshire	724,232 acres (2,931 km^{2})
8	Dumfriesshire	688,111 acres (2,785 km^{2})
9	Kirkcudbrightshire	574,024 acres (2,323 km^{2})
10	Angus	546,775 acres (2,213 km^{2})
11	Lanarkshire	535,862 acres (2,169 km^{2})
12	Caithness	438,833 acres (1,776 km^{2})
13	Roxburghshire	425,564 acres (1,722 km^{2})
14	Banffshire	403,054 acres (1,631 km^{2})
15	Zetland	352,337 acres (1,426 km^{2})
16	Fife	322,778 acres (1,306 km^{2})
17	Wigtownshire	311,983 acres (1,263 km^{2})
18	Moray	304,931 acres (1,234 km^{2})
19	Berwickshire	292,535 acres (1,184 km^{2})
20	Stirlingshire	288,349 acres (1,167 km^{2})
21	Kincardineshire	242,460 acres (981 km^{2})
22	Orkney	240,848 acres (975 km^{2})
23	Peeblesshire	222,240 acres (899 km^{2})
24	Midlothian	201,922 acres (817 km^{2})
25	Selkirkshire	171,209 acres (693 km^{2})
26	East Lothian	170,971 acres (692 km^{2})
27	Dunbartonshire	154,362 acres (625 km^{2})
28	Renfrewshire	143,829 acres (582 km^{2})
29	Bute	139,711 acres (565 km^{2})
30	Nairnshire	104,251 acres (422 km^{2})
31	West Lothian	76,859 acres (311 km^{2})
32	Kinross-shire	52,392 acres (212 km^{2})
33	Clackmannanshire	34,938 acres (141 km^{2})
Total	Scotland	18,985,354 acres (76,831 km^{2})

== Cities ==
Rank	County	Area
1	Glasgow City	34,647 acres (140 km^{2})
2	Edinburgh City	32,415 acres (131 km^{2})
3	Dundee City	12,229 acres (49 km^{2})
4	Aberdeen City	

== See also ==
- List of Scottish council areas by area
