= List of listed buildings in Nairn, Highland =

This is a list of listed buildings in the parish of Nairn in Highland, Scotland.

== List ==
Name	Location	Date listed	Grid ref. (Note: Sometimes known as OSGB36, the grid reference (where provided) is based on the British national grid reference system used by the Ordnance Survey. • "Guide to National Grid". Ordnance Survey. • "Get-a-map". Ordnance Survey.)	Geo-coordinates	Notes	LB number (Note: Historic Environment Scotland assign a unique alphanumeric identifier to each designated site in Scotland, for listed buildings this always begins with "LB", for example "LB12345".)	Image
8 And 9 Bath Street				57°35′12″N 3°52′15″W	Category B	38407	Upload Photo
Cawdor Street, War Memorial, Enclosing Wall And Piers				57°34′55″N 3°52′17″W	Category B	38409	Upload another image See more images
Church Road, Former Parish Church				57°34′58″N 3°51′57″W	Category C(S)	38411	Upload Photo
Crescent Road 1 And 2 Balvenie Place				57°35′11″N 3°52′09″W	Category C(S)	38416	Upload another image
6 And 8 Cumming Street				57°35′14″N 3°52′10″W	Category C(S)	38418	Upload Photo
10 And 12 Cumming Street Beach Lea				57°35′15″N 3°52′10″W	Category C(S)	38419	Upload Photo
Waverley Hotel And 4,6,8,10,12,14 High Street				57°35′01″N 3°52′14″W	Category C(S)	38423	Upload another image See more images
79 And 79A High Street, (Department Of Employment, And Peggys)				57°35′06″N 3°52′02″W	Category B	38436	Upload another image
High Street, Bank Of Scotland				57°35′06″N 3°52′04″W	Category B	38438	Upload another image
57 High Street, The Victoria Hotel				57°35′04″N 3°52′06″W	Category C(S)	38440	Upload Photo
Nairn Railway Station, Main Offices North (Down) Platform, Passenger Shelter And Ancillary Buildings, South (Up) Platform And Footbridge				57°34′48″N 3°52′19″W	Category B	38454	Upload another image See more images
Nairn Railway Station, West And East Signal Boxes North (Down) Platform				57°34′51″N 3°52′12″W	Category B	38455	Upload Photo
Altonburn Road, Alltan Donn House Including 1, 2, 3 Tradespark Road				57°35′02″N 3°54′00″W	Category B	49638	Upload Photo
Academy Street, Old Parish Church				57°35′01″N 3°52′35″W	Category A	38400	Upload another image See more images
Church Road, Former School (C G Higgins & Co)				57°35′01″N 3°52′00″W	Category C(S)	38412	Upload Photo
Crescent Road, Rawcliffe				57°35′13″N 3°52′08″W	Category B	38417	Upload Photo
High Street, Courthouse (Town And County Buildings)				57°35′06″N 3°52′07″W	Category B	38427	Upload another image See more images
75-77 High Street				57°35′06″N 3°52′04″W	Category C(S)	38437	Upload another image
61 High Street, (The Brass Kettle)				57°35′05″N 3°52′07″W	Category C(S)	38439	Upload Photo
Inverness Road, Newton Court				57°35′01″N 3°53′08″W	Category B	38444	Upload Photo
1 Marine Road And 2 Charles Place				57°35′14″N 3°52′11″W	Category C(S)	38451	Upload Photo
Meikle Kildrummie				57°33′38″N 3°54′52″W	Category B	14057	Upload Photo
Delnies Sandwood And Gate Lodge				57°34′31″N 3°54′35″W	Category B	14062	Upload Photo
Crescent Road, Havelock Hotel				57°35′13″N 3°52′10″W	Category C(S)	38415	Upload Photo
High Street, Mackintosh`S Buildings				57°35′08″N 3°52′03″W	Category B	38430	Upload another image
125 And 117 High Street				57°35′09″N 3°51′58″W	Category C(S)	38432	Upload another image
Off King Street, Viewfield, Statue To Dr John Grigor(1814-1866)				57°35′09″N 3°52′25″W	Category B	38448	Upload another image
2 Wellington Road Gate Piers And Garden Walls				57°34′59″N 3°52′20″W	Category B	38462	Upload Photo
Househill Househill Gate Lodge				57°34′34″N 3°51′42″W	Category C(S)	14056	Upload Photo
Delnies Beldorney				57°34′32″N 3°54′58″W	Category B	14060	Upload Photo
Academy Street, Nairn Rosebank Parish Church Hall				57°35′03″N 3°52′21″W	Category B	38402	Upload another image
4 And 6 Courthouse Lane				57°35′07″N 3°52′09″W	Category B	38413	Upload Photo
1, 2, 3 And 4 Gordon Street (Corner Site With 94 High Street)				57°35′09″N 3°52′01″W	Category B	38420	Upload another image
High Street, Royal Bank Of Scotland (Formerly The National Bank Of Scotland)				57°35′04″N 3°52′11″W	Category B	38425	Upload Photo
113 And 109 High Street				57°35′09″N 3°51′59″W	Category C(S)	38433	Upload another image
17 And 19 High Street, Clydesdale Bank				57°35′02″N 3°52′11″W	Category C(S)	38441	Upload another image
20 Queen Street, Scorrybreck				57°34′58″N 3°52′05″W	Category C(S)	38453	Upload Photo
Seabank Road, Broomholm, Broomholm Cottage And Boundary Walling				57°35′13″N 3°53′12″W	Category B	38458	Upload Photo
58 Seabank Road, Linkside, Linkside Cottage And Boundary Wall				57°35′14″N 3°53′17″W	Category B	38459	Upload Photo
Tradespark Road, Willowvale				57°34′57″N 3°53′53″W	Category B	38460	Upload Photo
Leopold Street, Former UP Manse				57°35′02″N 3°52′18″W	Category B	38463	Upload Photo
Geddes St Mary's Chapel And Graveyard				57°33′08″N 3°51′34″W	Category B	14053	Upload Photo
Rait Castle				57°32′57″N 3°51′00″W	Category A	14058	Upload Photo
Geddes House				57°33′00″N 3°52′01″W	Category B	14063	Upload Photo
Albert Street, Lion Cottage And Garden Wall				57°35′06″N 3°52′30″W	Category B	38405	Upload Photo
Albert Street, Tarland				57°35′17″N 3°53′14″W	Category B	38406	Upload Photo
Crescent Road, Kingillie				57°35′13″N 3°52′17″W	Category B	38414	Upload Photo
High Street, Jubilee Fountain				57°35′00″N 3°52′15″W	Category C(S)	38422	Upload another image See more images
High Street, Royal Hotel				57°35′07″N 3°52′04″W	Category B	38429	Upload another image
88 High Street (Tulloch)				57°35′08″N 3°52′02″W	Category B	38431	Upload another image
103 High Street				57°35′08″N 3°52′00″W	Category B	38435	Upload another image
Inverness Road, Newton Hotel And Fountain				57°35′02″N 3°53′03″W	Category B	38443	Upload Photo
Queen Street, St Columba's Episcopal Church				57°34′57″N 3°52′08″W	Category C(S)	38452	Upload Photo
Househill, House And Stables				57°34′28″N 3°51′39″W	Category C(S)	14059	Upload Photo
High Street, Market Cross				57°35′05″N 3°52′07″W	Category B	38428	Upload Photo
Off King Street, Viewfield				57°35′10″N 3°52′27″W	Category B	38447	Upload another image See more images
Tulloch Crescent, Woodville				57°34′51″N 3°52′35″W	Category B	38461	Upload Photo
Geddes Heathmount				57°32′40″N 3°52′18″W	Category B	14055	Upload Photo
Academy Street, St Mary's Roman Catholic Church And Manse				57°35′03″N 3°52′28″W	Category C(S)	38403	Upload another image See more images
High Street, Straith Monument				57°34′59″N 3°52′16″W	Category C(S)	38421	Upload another image See more images
High Street, Highland (Formerly Station Hotel) On Corner With Leopold Street				57°35′02″N 3°52′13″W	Category B	38424	Upload another image See more images
24-30 High Street Rose Bros And Co (Even Nos)				57°35′04″N 3°52′10″W	Category B	38426	Upload Photo
High Street, Constabulary Gardens With Gatepiers And Railings				57°35′07″N 3°51′59″W	Category C(S)	38434	Upload Photo
Marine Road, Bandstand				57°35′16″N 3°52′16″W	Category A	38450	Upload another image See more images
Geddes House Steading, Stables And Carriage House Walled Garden				57°33′02″N 3°52′11″W	Category C(S)	14052	Upload Photo
Market Stance Cottage By St. Mary's Chapel				57°33′07″N 3°51′32″W	Category C(S)	14054	Upload Photo
Delnies Delniesmuir And Gate Lodge				57°34′32″N 3°55′04″W	Category B	14061	Upload Photo
Nairn Town and County Hospital, Cawdor Road				57°34′41″N 3°52′21″W	Category C(S)	49942	Upload another image
Academy Street, Nairn Rosebank Parish Church (Formerly Nairn UP Church)				57°35′03″N 3°52′20″W	Category B	38401	Upload another image See more images
Altonburn Road, Achareidh House				57°35′01″N 3°53′40″W	Category B	38404	Upload Photo
Bridge Street, Road Bridge Over Nairn River				57°35′09″N 3°51′53″W	Category B	38408	Upload another image
Cawdor Street, British Legion Club; House, Gatepiers And Walling To Cawdor Street				57°34′57″N 3°52′15″W	Category B	38410	Upload another image
High Street, St Ninian's Church And Parish Hall				57°34′59″N 3°52′14″W	Category B	38442	Upload Photo
King Street, Congregational Church				57°35′12″N 3°52′07″W	Category C(S)	38445	Upload another image
King Street, Roseneath House				57°35′13″N 3°52′03″W	Category C(S)	38446	Upload Photo
Manse Road, Old Parish Church Manse				57°35′02″N 3°52′38″W	Category B	38449	Upload another image See more images
Nairn Viaduct Over River Nairn				57°34′57″N 3°51′53″W	Category B	38457	Upload another image

== Key ==
The scheme for classifying buildings in Scotland is:

- Category A: "buildings of national or international importance, either architectural or historic; or fine, little-altered examples of some particular period, style or building type."
- Category B: "buildings of regional or more than local importance; or major examples of some particular period, style or building type, which may have been altered."
- Category C: "buildings of local importance; lesser examples of any period, style, or building type, as originally constructed or moderately altered; and simple traditional buildings which group well with other listed buildings."

In March 2016 there were 47,288 listed buildings in Scotland. Of these, 8% were Category A, and 50% were Category B, with the remaining 42% being Category C.

== See also ==
- List of listed buildings in Highland
