= List of counties of Scotland by population in 1971 =

This is a list of counties in Scotland, ordered by population as at the 1971 census.

Rank	County	Total population
1	Glasgow City	897,484
2	Lanark	626,787
3	Edinburgh City	453,585
4	Renfrew	362,130
5	Ayr	361,248
6	Fife	327,126
7	Dunbarton	237,540
8	Stirling	208,958
9	Dundee City	182,204
10	Aberdeen City	182,071
11	Midlothian	142,213
12	Aberdeen	137,962
13	Perth	127,104
14	West Lothian	108,484
15	Angus	97,312
16	Inverness	89,655
17	Dumfries	88,215
18	Argyll	59,777
19	Ross and Cromarty	58,284
20	East Lothian	55,908
21	Moray	51,502
22	Clackmannan	45,544
23	Banff	43,500
24	Roxburgh	41,960
25	Caithness	27,792
26	Kirkudbright	27,639
27	Wigtown	27,337
28	Kincardine	26,066
29	Selkirk	20,868
30	Berwick	20,778
31	Zetland	17,331
32	Orkney	17,082
33	Peebles	13,675
34	Bute	13,309
35	Sutherland	13,055
36	Nairn	11,050
37	Kinross	6,423

== See also ==
- List of counties of Scotland 1890–1975
