= List of counties of Scotland by population in 1951 =

This is a list of counties in Scotland, ordered by population as at the 1951 census.

Rank	County	Total population
1	Glasgow City	1,089,767
2	Lanark	524,596
3	Edinburgh City	466,761
4	Renfrew	324,660
5	Ayr	321,237
6	Fife	306,778
7	Stirling	187,527
8	Aberdeen City	182,714
9	Dundee City	177,340
10	Dunbarton	164,269
11	Perth	128,029
12	Aberdeen	125,341
13	Midlothian	98,974
14	Angus	97,536
15	West Lothian	88,577
16	Dumfries	85,660
17	Inverness	84,930
18	Argyll	63,361
19	Ross and Cromarty	60,508
20	East Lothian	52,258
21	Banff	50,148
22	Moray	48,218
23	Roxburgh	45,557
24	Clackmannan	37,532
25	Wigtown	31,620
26	Kirkcudbright	30,725
27	Kincardine	27,882
28	Berwick	25,068
29	Caithness	22,710
30	Selkirk	21,729
31	Orkney	21,255
32	Zetland	19,352
33	Bute	19,283
34	Peebles	15,232
35	Sutherland	13,670
36	Nairn	8,719
37	Kinross	7,418
