= Ardclach Bell Tower =

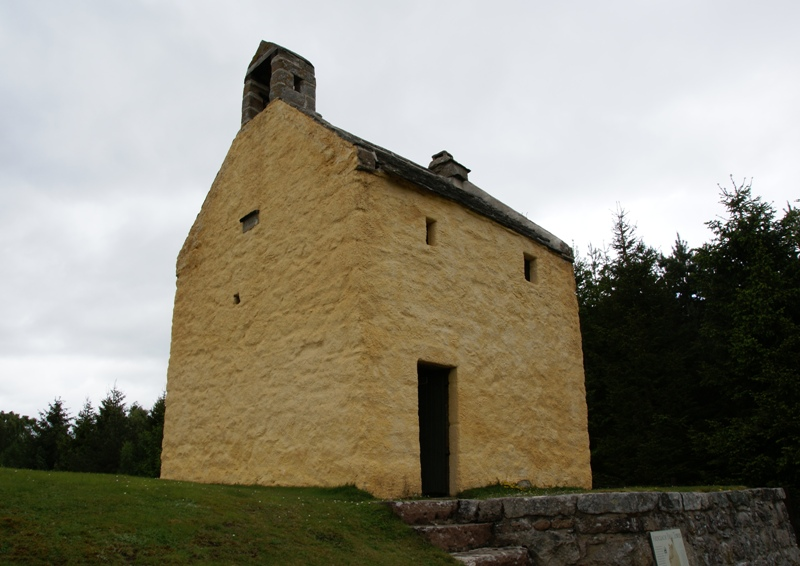
- The building in 2011, looking north
- Interactive map of the Ardclach Bell Tower area

General information
- Type: Bell tower Watch tower Keep
- Location: Ardclach, Highland, Scotland
- Coordinates: 57.486123°N 3.746715°W
- Completed: 1655 (371 years ago)

Technical details
- Floor count: 2

Ardclach Bell Tower is an historic structure in Ardclach, Scottish Highlands. Dating to at least 1655, it is now a Category A listed building. It is believed to be the only tower and belfry combination in Scotland.

The structure, erected as a tower, belfry and keep, is a simple square with a two-storey tower with a double pitched roof. It is harled with ashlar dressings.

A monogram, "MGB", above the second-storey fireplace, refers to Margaret Grant Brodie, wife of Alexander Brodie of Lethen.

== Gallery ==
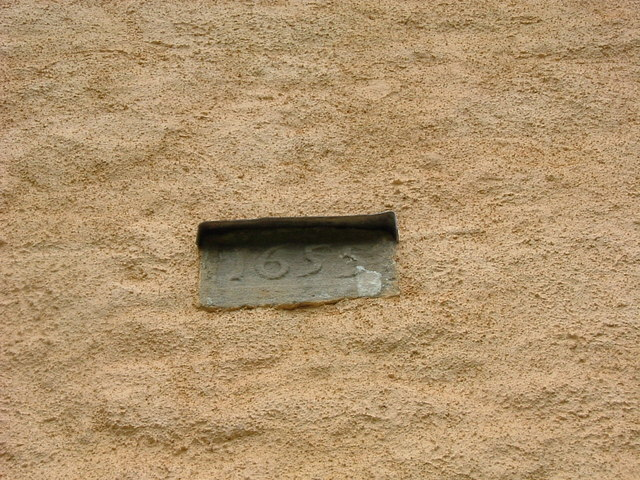
Date inscription

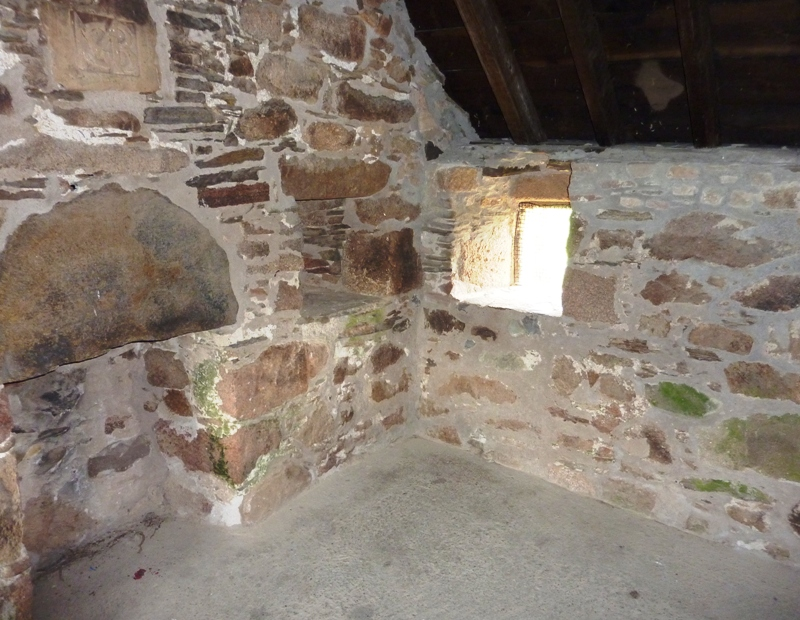
"MGB" monogram carving
