= Ferness =

Coordinates: 57.4833°N 3.7312°W

Ferness: Scottish Gaelic: Feàrnais
- Location within the Nairn area
- OS grid reference: NH963450
- Council area: Highland
- Country: Scotland
- Sovereign state: United Kingdom
- Post town: NAIRN
- Postcode district: IV12
- Dialling code: 01309
- Police: Scotland
- Fire: Scottish
- Ambulance: Scottish

Ferness (Scottish Gaelic: Feàrnais) is a settlement and rural area in Strathdearn, in the council area of Highland.

The settlement is situated in a forested area of the valley of the River Findhorn at the crossroads of the A939 Nairn–Grantown-on-Spey and B9007 Forres–Carrbridge roads.

== Notable people ==
- John Baird Simpson was born and raised here.
- Ellie Stone

== In popular culture ==
The name Ferness was used for the fictional village at the centre of the story in the 1983 comedy-drama Local Hero; no filming took place in the real Ferness.
