= Nairn Town and County Buildings =

Municipal building in Nairn, Scotland

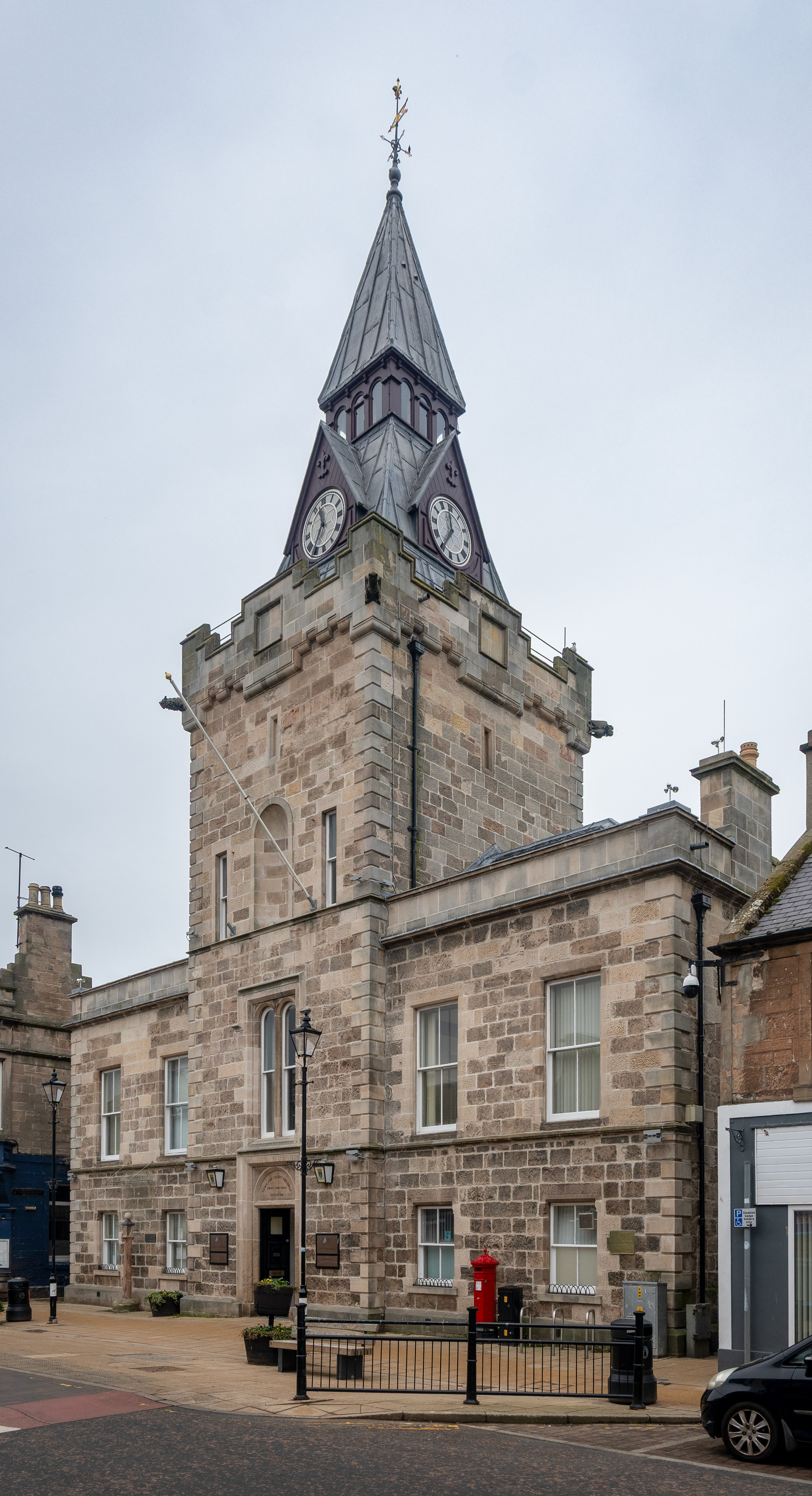
- Nairn Town and County Buildings

- Shown in Highland
- 57.5850°N 3.8686°W
- Location: High Street, Nairn

History
- Built: 1818

Site notes
- Architect: Mr Smith
- Architectural style: Neoclassical style

Listed Building – Category B
- Official name: Former Court House including prison and boundary walls to rear, High Street, Nairn
- Designated: 12 March 1981
- Reference no.: LB38427

Nairn Town and County Buildings is a municipal structure in the High Street, Nairn, Highland, Scotland. The structure, which is used as a service point for the Highland Council, is a Category B listed building.

== History ==
The first municipal building in Nairn was an old tolbooth which was built on land donated by Hugh Rose of Kilravock Castle in the late 16th century. The covenanter, Thomas Ross, after being accused of keeping conventicles, was imprisoned in the tolbooth in 1675. The building was destroyed by Royalist troops in 1716 and rebuilt in the mid-18th century. After the tolbooth became dilapidated in the early 19th century, the burgh leaders decided to demolish it and to replace it with a new building.

The new building was designed by a Mr Smith, built by a local mason, John Wilson, in ashlar stone at a cost of £1,392 and was completed in 1818. The original design involved a symmetrical main frontage with five bays facing onto the High Street; the central bay, which slightly projected forward, featured a doorway on the ground floor, a mullioned window on the first floor and a square castellated tower above. The tower featured a niche flanked by lancet windows at the front and was surmounted by an octagonal belfry and by a spire. There was regular fenestration in the outer bays.

A new bell, cast by Thomas Mears of London, was installed in the belfry, replacing two smaller bells, in 1843. A prison, erected at the rear of the building to a design by Thomas Brown, was completed in 1844, and further work, which included the replacement of the belfry and spire with a more elaborate structure incorporating clock faces, was carried out to a design by Alexander and William Reid in 1870. The new spire was 24.7 metres (81 ft) high. Internally, the principal rooms included a council chamber, for meetings of both the town council of Nairn burgh and the commissioners of supply for Nairnshire, a courtroom, for magistrates' and sheriffs' court hearings, and there was an archive room in the tower.

Following the implementation of the Local Government (Scotland) Act 1889 which established a uniform system of county councils in Scotland, the new Nairn County Council also met in the building. In 1930 the county council amalgamated with Moray County Council for most purposes, based in Elgin. Nairn County Council continued to perform some functions alone, notably acting as the district council for the part of the county outside the burgh of Nairn. In that capacity, the county council acquired the former Free School at 4 Courthouse Lane, behind the town and county buildings, to serve as its offices. Nairn Town Council also supplemented its offices, buying Viewfield House off King Street in 1948, but continued to meet at the town and county buildings.

The building served as the meeting place of Nairn District Council after it was formed in 1975 on the abolition of both the county council and Nairn Town Council. The district council also continued to use 4 Courthouse Lane to accommodate council officers and their departments. It ceased to be the local seat of government when the new unitary authority, the Highland Council, was formed in 1996, and instead operated as a service point for the delivery of local services.

The building ceased to be used as a courthouse in 2008, when the district court transferred to Inverness.

An extensive programme of restoration works, including repairs to the masonry, the refurbishment of the clock mechanism and new lighting to the front of the building, was undertaken by Laing Traditional Masonry and completed in October 2020.

Works of art in the building include a portrait by George Fiddes Watt of the former Lord Chancellor, Robert Finlay, 1st Viscount Finlay.

== See also ==
- List of listed buildings in Nairn, Highland
