= Counties of Scotland =

Historic administrative and geographical division of Scotland

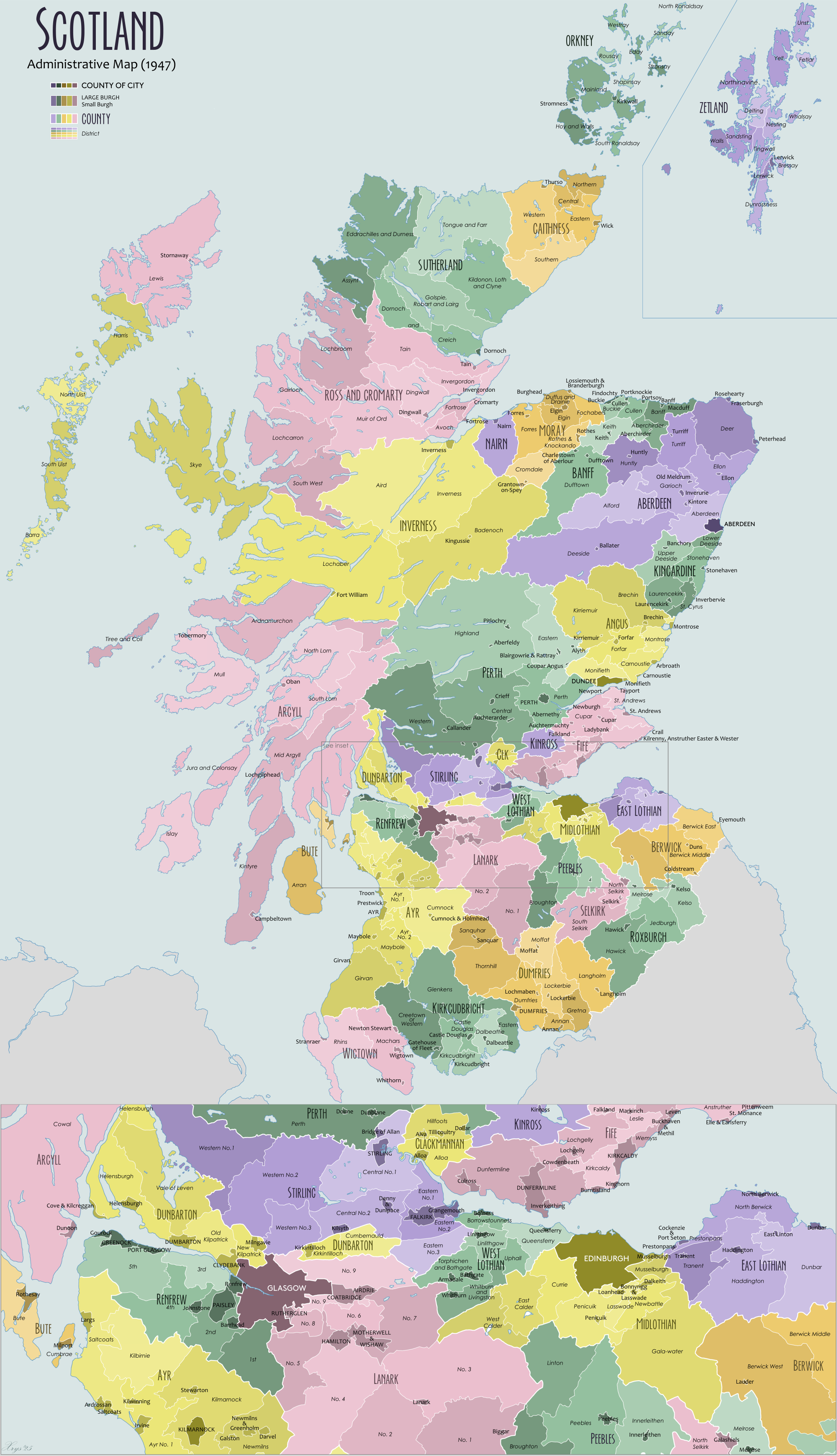
Map of counties, districts and burghs of Scotland in 1947

The counties or shires of Scotland (Scottish Gaelic: Siorrachdan na h-Alba) were historic subdivisions of Scotland.

The shires were originally established in the Middle Ages for judicial purposes, being territories over which a sheriff had jurisdiction. They were distinct from the various older mormaerdoms, earldoms and other territories into which Scotland was also divided, which are collectively termed the provinces of Scotland by modern historians. The provinces gradually lost their functions, whereas the shires gradually gained functions. From the 16th century, the shires served as constituencies, electing shire commissioners to the Parliament of Scotland. From 1667 each shire had commissioners of supply responsible for collecting local taxes; the commissioners of supply were subsequently given various local government functions as well. From 1797, the shires also served as areas for organising the militia, which was the responsibility of a lord-lieutenant.

Following the union of Scotland and England under the Acts of Union 1707, the term "county" came to be used interchangeably with the older term "shire". From 1748 onwards sheriffs ceased to be automatically appointed to a single shire, with progressively larger sheriffdoms created instead, grouping multiple shires under a single sheriff.

Elected county councils were created in 1890 under the Local Government (Scotland) Act 1889, taking most of the functions of the commissioners of supply. The county councils were abolished in 1975, when local government was reorganised. Following another reorganisation in 1996, Scotland is now divided into 32 council areas. Some of the council areas share names with the historic counties, but in most such cases they have notable differences in their boundaries. The historic counties are still used for certain limited functions, serving as registration counties. There are also lieutenancy areas which are based on the historic counties, but with some notable differences.

== History ==
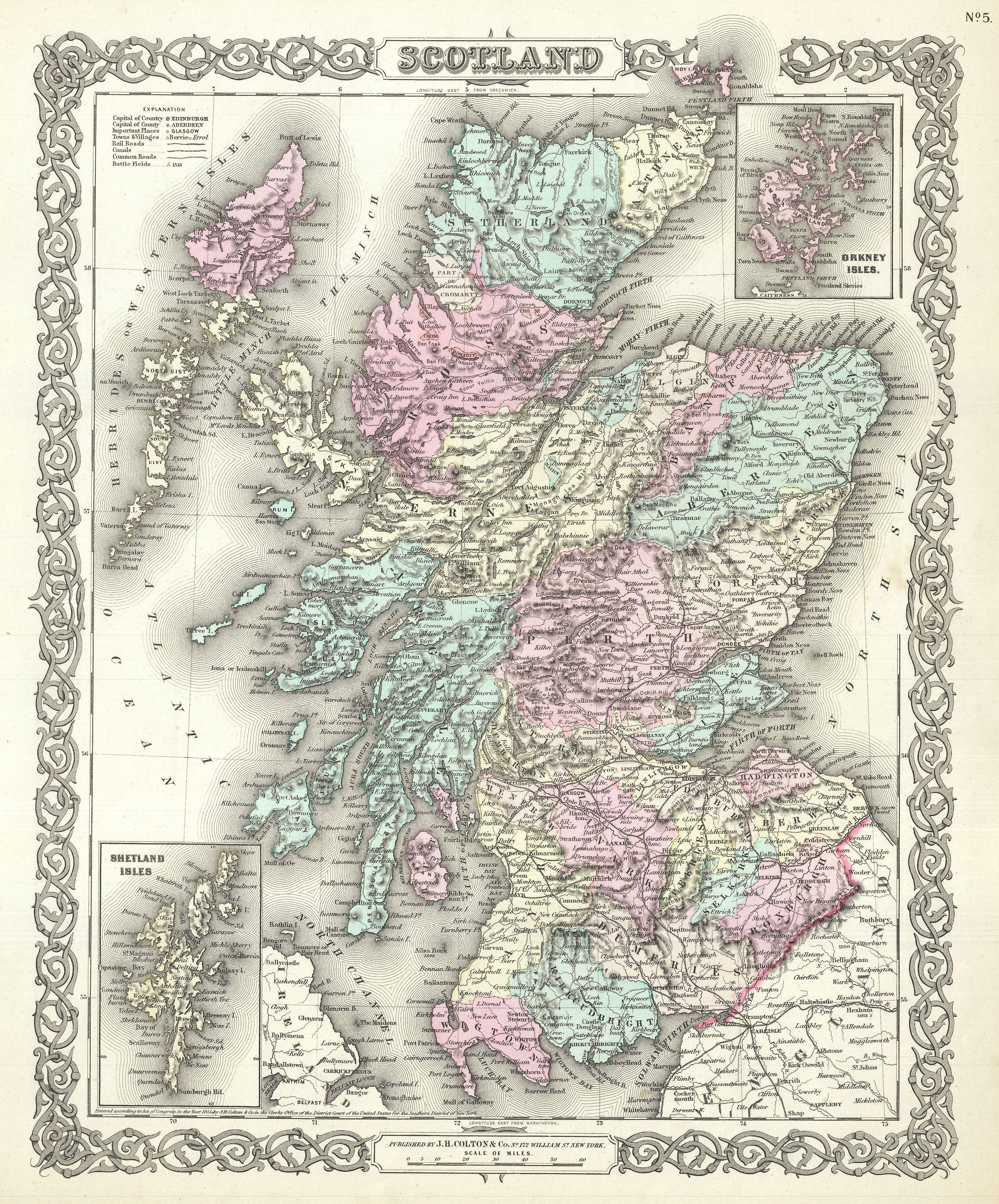
The counties as they were in 1855

=== Shires ===
The early Kingdom of Alba was subdivided into smaller territories under the control of various ranks of noble, including mormaers, earls, and thanes. As Alba expanded and evolved into the Kingdom of Scotland, it took in various other territories as it grew. There was no single collective term for these territories at the time, but modern historians now use the term provinces, or provincial lordships for the smaller ones.

Malcolm III (reigned 1058 to 1093) appears to have introduced sheriffs as part of a policy of imitating the administrative structures then being used in England by its Norman rulers. The provinces formed part of the feudal hierarchy of land ownership, but justice was administered by sheriffs, appointed to separately defined shires. More shires were created by Edgar (reigned 1097 to 1107), Alexander I (reigned 1107 to 1124), and in particular David I (reigned 1124 to 1153). David completed the division of the country (as it then was) into shires by the conversion of existing thanedoms.

The shires occasionally covered the same area as a province; for example, the shire of Forfar covered the same area as the province of Angus. More often though, the shires were groupings or subdivisions of the provinces. For example, the province of Lothian was covered by the three shires of Linlithgow, Edinburgh and Haddington. Conversely, the shire of Ayr covered the three provinces of Carrick, Cunninghame and Kyle. Shires were sometimes created which did not endure. For example, there was a Sheriff of Dingwall in the mid-13th century, and in 1293 shires of Lorn and Kintyre were created, which were later merged into the shire of Argyll.

=== Shires extant by 1305 ===
In 1305 Edward I of England, who had deposed John Balliol, issued an ordinance for the government of Scotland. The document listed the twenty-three shires then existing and either appointed new sheriffs or continued heritable sheriffs in office.

- Aberdeen
- Ayr (divided into the Bailieries of Carrick, Cunninghame and Kyle)
- Banff
- Berwick (dependent on the governor of Berwick Castle)
- Clackmannan
- Cromarty (had been formed by 1266, covering only the area immediately surrounding Cromarty)
- Dunbarton
- Dumfries
- Edinburgh
- Elgin and Forres
- Fife
- Forfar
- Haddington
- Inverness
- Kincardine or the Mearns
- Kinross
- Lanark (included what later became Renfrewshire)
- Linlithgow
- Peebles
- Perth
- Roxburgh or Teviotdale (appears to have been created in the period 1114–1133, not mentioned in the ordinance) (Note: Gospatric was mentioned as sheriff in a number of charters of Earl David. The shire was not listed in the ordinance, and in 1305 appears to have been partly under the jurisdiction of the sheriff of Selkirk, with the remainder comprised in the constabularies of Jedburgh and Roxburgh under the jurisdiction of the constable of Berwick. The shire was one of those surrendered to Edward III of England in 1334.)
- Selkirk
- Stirling
- Wigtown

=== Shires formed after 1305 ===
The remaining shires were formed either by the territorial expansion of the Kingdom of Scotland, or by the subdivision of existing sheriffdoms. There were occasional changes to the shires; those of the Lowlands were relatively stable from the 14th century, but there were more pronounced changes to the shires of the Highlands and Islands into the 17th century, as the Scottish crown sought to consolidate its authority over the whole kingdom.

- c. 1326: Argyll (or Argyle): lordship subdued by Alexander II in 1222. Norwegian claims over the area finally ended in 1266. First record of appointment of sheriff dates from 1326.
- 1369: Kirkcudbright: formed when area between Rivers Nith and Cree granted to Archibald the Grim. Archibald appointed a steward to administer the area, hence it became a "stewartry".
- c. 1388: Bute: the islands formed part of Kintyre district of Argyll. A heritable sheriff was appointed to the shire in 1388.
- 1402: Renfrew: separated from the Shire of Lanark by Robert III.
- Tarbertshire: existed from before 1481, when it gained territory from Perthshire, until 1633, when it was annexed to Argyll.
- Orkney and Shetland were absorbed into the Kingdom of Scotland in 1472. They initially kept their own legal systems which had operated when they were under Norwegian rule, with Orkney being an earldom and Shetland a lordship. They were placed under a single Sheriff of Orkney and Shetland in 1541, and the general laws of Scotland were applied in 1612.
- Ross eventually became a fully-fledged shire in 1661, after a couple of earlier abortive attempts. It was briefly a shire between 1504 and 1509, formed from part of Inverness-shire by an act of parliament during the reign of James IV, the sheriff to sit at Tain or Dingwall. Ross was restored to Inverness-shire in 1509. Another act in 1649 re-stated Ross's separation from Inverness-shire, but was only implemented for the purposes of appointing commissioners (as members of the Parliament of Scotland were called). A subsequent act in 1661 finally separated Ross from Inverness-shire for all other purposes. Sir George Mackenzie's Ross-shire estates were transferred to Cromartyshire by a 1685 act of parliament (repealed 1686, re-enacted 1690).
- 1633: Sutherland: separated from Inverness. (Note: In 1583 the Earl of Huntly, hereditary sheriff of Inverness, granted the Earl of Sutherland jurisdiction over the sheriffdom of Sutherland and Strathnaver. This was only the south-eastern area of the later county, with Halladale River forming the boundary. The shire was formed in 1631 by crown writ of Charles I, severing Sutherland from Inverness. The new county comprised the Earldom of Sutherland along with Assynt and the baronies between Ross and Caithness. Dornoch was appointed the head burgh of the shire. The writ was confirmed by the Parliament of Scotland in 1633.)
- Caithness, like Ross, was briefly removed from Inverness-shire to be its own shire between 1504 and 1509. The area of the shire was that of the Diocese of Caithness and the sheriff was to sit at Dornoch or Wick. Caithness was restored to being a shire in 1641, but covering just the smaller area of the earldom of Caithness; other parts of the diocese had since been included in the shire of Sutherland created in 1633.

=== Commissioners of Supply ===
From the 17th century the shires started to be used for local administration apart from judicial functions. In 1667 Commissioners of Supply were appointed in each shire to collect the land tax. There were 33 shires at that time, which were each given their own commissioners of supply, with the exception of the sheriffdom of Orkney and Shetland, where separate bodies of commissioners were created for each group of islands.

Orkney and Shetland having one sheriff but two sets of commissioners of supply led to ambiguity about their status. At a court case in 1829, the Court of Session was asked to rule on whether Shetland and Orkney formed one shire or two. The court declined to give such a ruling in abstract terms, as the answer depended on the context; they were one shire for the purposes of the administration of justice, lieutenancy, and parliamentary constituencies, but formed two shires for local government functions.

The commissioners were gradually given other local government functions. The commissioners did not exercise powers over any royal burghs within their areas, which were self-governing.

=== 1707 Act of Union and the ending of heritable jurisdictions ===
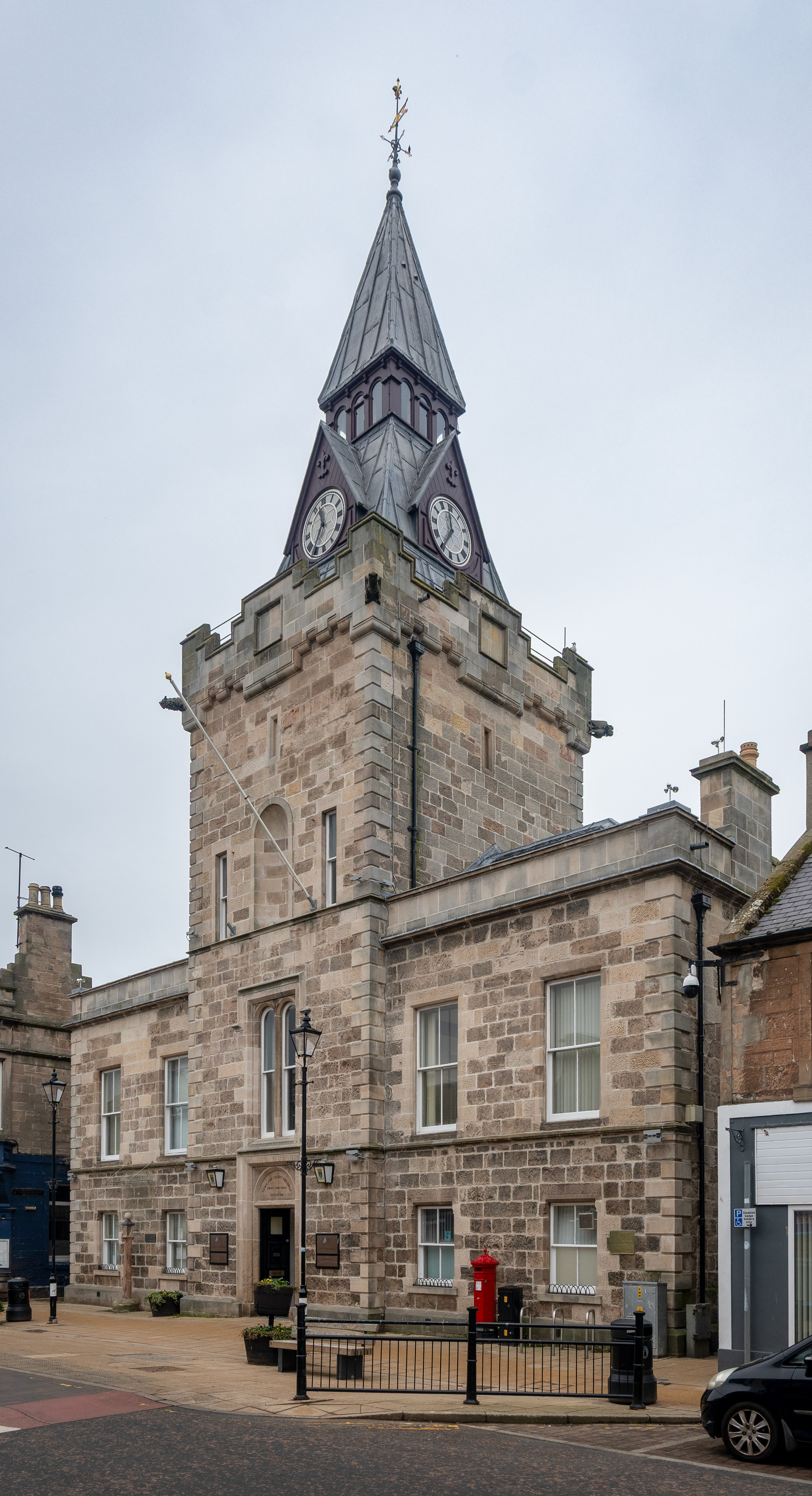
Nairn Town and County Buildings: Built 1818 as courthouse for Nairnshire and meeting place for both the county's commissioners of supply and the town council of the burgh of Nairn

In 1707, the Act of Union united Scotland with England. England also had shires, which had been mostly created in Anglo-Saxon times, and had gradually also come to be known as counties. The word 'county' means an area controlled by a noble called a count in Norman French, or earl in English. Following the Norman Conquest, England's earldoms (which, like Scotland's provinces, had previously covered substantially different territories to the shires) were reorganised to generally correspond to individual shires, which therefore also became known as counties.

Unlike in England, Scotland's shires remained quite distinct territories from its earldoms and other provinces in 1707. Whereas English earls by that time had little or no role in local administration, Scottish earls and other nobles continued to exercise significant authority in their provinces, having powers of regality to hold courts which operated in parallel with those of the sheriffs. Despite the shires of Scotland not being controlled by a count or earl as their English counterparts had once been, following the union of 1707, the term 'county' also came to be used for Scottish shires.

The office of sheriff or steward had become hereditary in certain families in the majority of sheriffdoms. At the accession of George II in 1727, twenty-two sheriffs were hereditary, three were appointed for life and only eight held office at the pleasure of the monarch. (Note: The heritable sheriffdoms were Argyll, Bute, Banff, Caithness, Clackmannan, Cromarty, Dumbarton, Dumfries, Elgin, Fife, Kinross, Kirkcudbright, Linlithgow, Nairn, Orkney & Zetland, Peebles, Renfrew, Roxburgh, Selkirk, Sutherland, Stirling and Wigtown; those appointed for life were Perth, Forfar and Ayr; those held at pleasure were Aberdeen, Berwick, Edinburgh, Haddington, Inverness, Kincardine, Lanark and Ross.)

Following the unsuccessful Jacobite Rising of 1745 the government took the opportunity of overhauling county government. In 1748, under the Heritable Jurisdictions (Scotland) Act 1746, hereditary sheriffs were abolished, with the right to appoint all sheriffs returning to the crown. The same act also abolished other hereditary jurisdictions including regality, justiciary and others; these had formed the basis for the authority of the earls and other nobles in their provinces. Those office holders who were displaced were compensated. The reforms of 1748 therefore saw the effective end of any meaningful function for the provinces, with the shires or counties thereafter being the main administrative divisions of Scotland.

Also in 1748, under the Sheriffs (Scotland) Act 1747, the office of sheriff principal was reduced to a largely ceremonial one, with a sheriff depute or sheriff substitute appointed to each 'county, shire or stewartry'. Twelve of the smallest counties were paired to form sheriffdoms, a process of amalgamation that was to continue until the twentieth century, and thus led to the sheriffdoms and the shires having different boundaries. Where multiple shires were grouped into a single sheriffdom after 1748, the grouped shires were nevertheless still considered separate shires, retaining separate commissioners of supply.

In 1794 Lord-Lieutenants were appointed to each county, and in 1797 county militia regiments were raised, bringing Scotland into line with England, Wales and Ireland.

In 1858 police forces were established in each shire under the Police (Scotland) Act 1857. The counties lost their role as constituencies under the Representation of the People (Scotland) Act 1868, generally being divided into smaller constituencies. The group of constituencies within each county was termed the 'parliamentary county'.

=== County councils ===
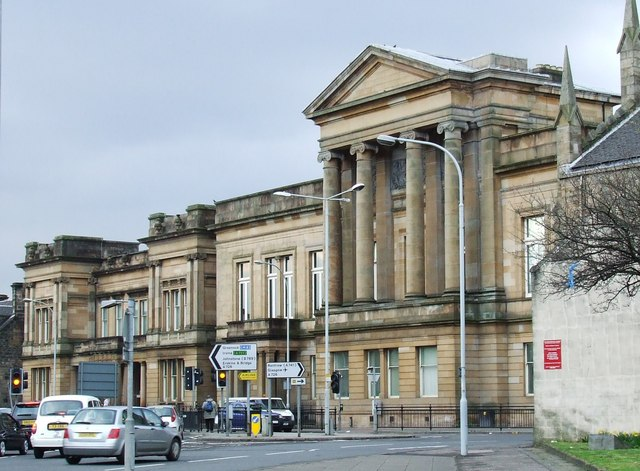
The county buildings in Paisley, formerly the seat of Renfrew County Council

Elected county councils were introduced in 1890 under the Local Government (Scotland) Act 1889, taking most of the functions of the commissioners of supply, which were eventually abolished in 1930. The 1889 Act also merged Ross-shire and Cromartyshire into a single county called Ross and Cromarty, and resolved the ambiguity regarding Orkney and Shetland by declaring them to be two separate counties (using the then-prevalent spelling of 'Zetland' for Shetland), after which there were 33 counties.

The act also triggered a review of parish and county boundaries to eliminate exclaves and cases where parishes straddled county boundaries. Most of the resulting boundary changes took effect in 1891. The amended boundaries were not just used for the local government functions of the county councils, but were also applied for all other administrative functions, including justice, militia, school boards and other functions, with just three exceptions. Firstly, the boundary changes did not affect any parliamentary constituencies, which remained as they were when last reviewed under the Redistribution of Seats Act 1885. This led to some divergence between the counties and the parliamentary counties, which was resolved when constituencies were next reviewed in 1918. Secondly, valuation rolls continued to have effect over the area for which they had been originally compiled. Thirdly, any ecclesiastical rights or jurisdictions were unaffected by the changes to boundaries (a provision more relevant to the parish changes than the county ones).

Burghs were towns with certain rights of self-government. Prior to the introduction of county councils in 1890, there were two main types: royal burghs and police burghs. Some burghs were additionally classed as parliamentary burghs, excluding them from the constituency of the wider county. Royal burghs were independent from the county's commissioners of supply, but police burghs were not. Both types of burgh were subject to the authority of the sheriff court of the county, with the exception of the burgh of Edinburgh, which from 1482 had appointed its own sheriff. Edinburgh was thereafter sometimes described as the "city and county of the city of Edinburgh" to distinguish it from the surrounding "county of Edinburgh" (Midlothian).

When county councils were created in 1890, the 26 largest burghs were allowed to retain their independence, but smaller burghs were placed under the authority of the county councils. Following the example of Edinburgh, three of the burghs outside county council control were subsequently also made independent from their host county for other functions too, with the provost of such burghs acting as lieutenant, being Glasgow in 1893, Dundee in 1894, and Aberdeen in 1899.

Aberdeen, Dundee, Edinburgh and Glasgow were then each known as a county of a city. The boundaries of the counties of cities were periodically expanded as their urban areas grew. With the exception of the four counties of cities, the other burghs which had been excluded from county council control in 1890 were all placed under the authority of the county councils in 1930.

Under the Local Government (Scotland) Act 1929, the county councils of the two least populous counties, Kinross-shire and Nairnshire, were each paired with a larger neighbour; Nairnshire with Moray, and Kinross-shire with Perthshire. The county councils of these four counties continued to be elected separately, but most functions were provided through them acting as the "joint county councils" of Perth & Kinross and Moray & Nairn.

=== Reforms and loss of functions ===
In 1963 the Government published a white paper which proposed a reduction in the number of counties from thirty-four to between ten and fifteen. A process of consultation between county councils and officials from the Scottish Office was begun to effect the amalgamations. Following a change of government, it was announced in 1965 that a "more comprehensive and authoritative" review of local government areas would be undertaken.

In 1966 a Royal Commission on Local Government in Scotland, chaired by Lord Wheatley, was appointed. The commission's report in 1969 recommended the replacement of the counties with larger regions.

In 1970 another change in government control was followed by the publication of a white paper in 1971 implementing the commission's reforms in a modified form. The abolition of counties "for local government purposes" was enacted by the Local Government (Scotland) Act 1973, with counties playing no part in local government after 16 May 1975, being replaced by regions and districts. The counties had already lost almost all their non-local government functions by this time; justice was administered by larger sheriffdoms and counties no longer served as constituencies. As part of the 1975 reforms, lord-lieutenants ceased to be appointed to counties, instead being appointed to new lieutenancy areas based on groups of the new districts. The lieutenancy areas loosely corresponded to the pre-1975 counties, but with some notable differences. The administrative functions left operating on a county basis after 1975 were very few, principally relating to land registration, in which capacity they are known as registration counties.

Local government was reorganised again in 1996 under the Local Government etc. (Scotland) Act 1994, with the regions and districts being replaced by 32 single-tier council areas. (Note: There are also community councils in some areas; they have no statutory powers, but serve as a representative body for their communities. All of Scotland is divided into communities, but a community council is only formed if there is sufficient interest from residents.) Some of the council areas have the same names as historic counties, but may cover significantly different areas. For example, the Aberdeenshire council area is much larger than the historic county of Aberdeenshire, also including most of the historic county of Kincardineshire and part of Banffshire, whereas the Renfrewshire council area is much smaller than historic Renfrewshire, only covering the central part of the historic county. Conversely, Fife retained the same boundaries at both the 1975 and 1996 reforms.

The historic counties of Scotland are included in the Index of Place Names (IPN) published by the Office for National Statistics. Each "place" included in the IPN is related to the historic county it lies within, as well as to a set of administrative areas.

== Names ==
None of the counties' legal names included the suffix "shire". Those counties named after towns therefore had the same name as the town, but were routinely referred to in legal contexts as the "shire of X" or "county of X" in order to distinguish the county from the town. However, in general usage, many of the counties had "shire" appended to their names, particularly those named after towns.

The first detailed county maps of Scotland were produced in the late 17th century. John Adair's maps of c. 1682 included the names of Midlothian, East Lothian, Twaddall and Wast Lothian (the latter also as "Linlithgowshire"). The county maps of Herman Moll (c. 1745) preferred to keep the "Shire" suffix a separate word, as for example "Berwick Shire", "Roxburgh Shire", "the Shire of Selkirk otherwise known as Etterick Forest", and in the north to "Murray" (Moray), "Inverness Shire", "Aberdeen Shire", "Banff Shire", "Ross Shire". The map of Boswell's and Johnson's A Journey to the Western Islands of Scotland (1773) gives "Shire" to every one shown, including "Angus Shire" and "Fife Shire".

The Ordnance Survey's official maps produced from the 19th century onwards adopted the practice of adding "shire" to the end of the name of each shire named after a town, and also used the names Argyllshire, Buteshire, Ross-shire (prior to its merger with Cromartyshire in 1889) and Morayshire, despite those four not being named after towns.

Some counties had alternative names by which they were sometimes known. In five cases the legal name was changed during the 20th century:

- Edinburghshire became Midlothian in 1913. (Note: Change of name by resolution of the county council with interim recognition from the government pending such time as an appropriate statute for formally changing the name was brought forward. Statutory confirmation of the change of name eventually took place in 1947 under the Local Government (Scotland) Act 1947.)
- Elginshire became Moray in 1919.
- Haddingtonshire became East Lothian in 1921.
- Linlithgowshire became West Lothian in 1925.
- Forfarshire became Angus in 1928.

Other alternative names sometimes used informally included 'The Mearns' for Kincardineshire, 'Tweeddale' for Peeblesshire, 'Ettrick Forest' for Selkirkshire, and 'Teviotdale' for Roxburghshire.

Until the 1930s, the General Post Office advised against included county names in addresses, recommending they only be used in those cases where it was necessary to distinguish between post towns with the same name.

The Post Office changed its policy in the 1930s, requiring the name of the county in which the post town lay to be included in most cases, with the exception of certain post towns which were large and well-known places, or which gave their names to their counties. Like the Ordnance Survey, the Post Office appended "shire" to the legal name for all counties named after towns. For counties not named after towns, the Post Office used the form Morayshire, and used Ross-shire for the mainland part of Ross and Cromarty. Otherwise, it omitted the "shire" suffix. The Post Office also used the spelling "Shetland" rather than the legal spelling of "Zetland".

The county council of Dunbartonshire considered a motion to change that county's name to "Lennox" in 1956. Supporters of the idea argued that as well as bringing back into use the name of the old province which had covered the area, it would eliminate the long-standing confusion caused by the county using the spelling "Dunbarton" and the town the spelling "Dumbarton". The change was not pursued.

== Lists of shires ==
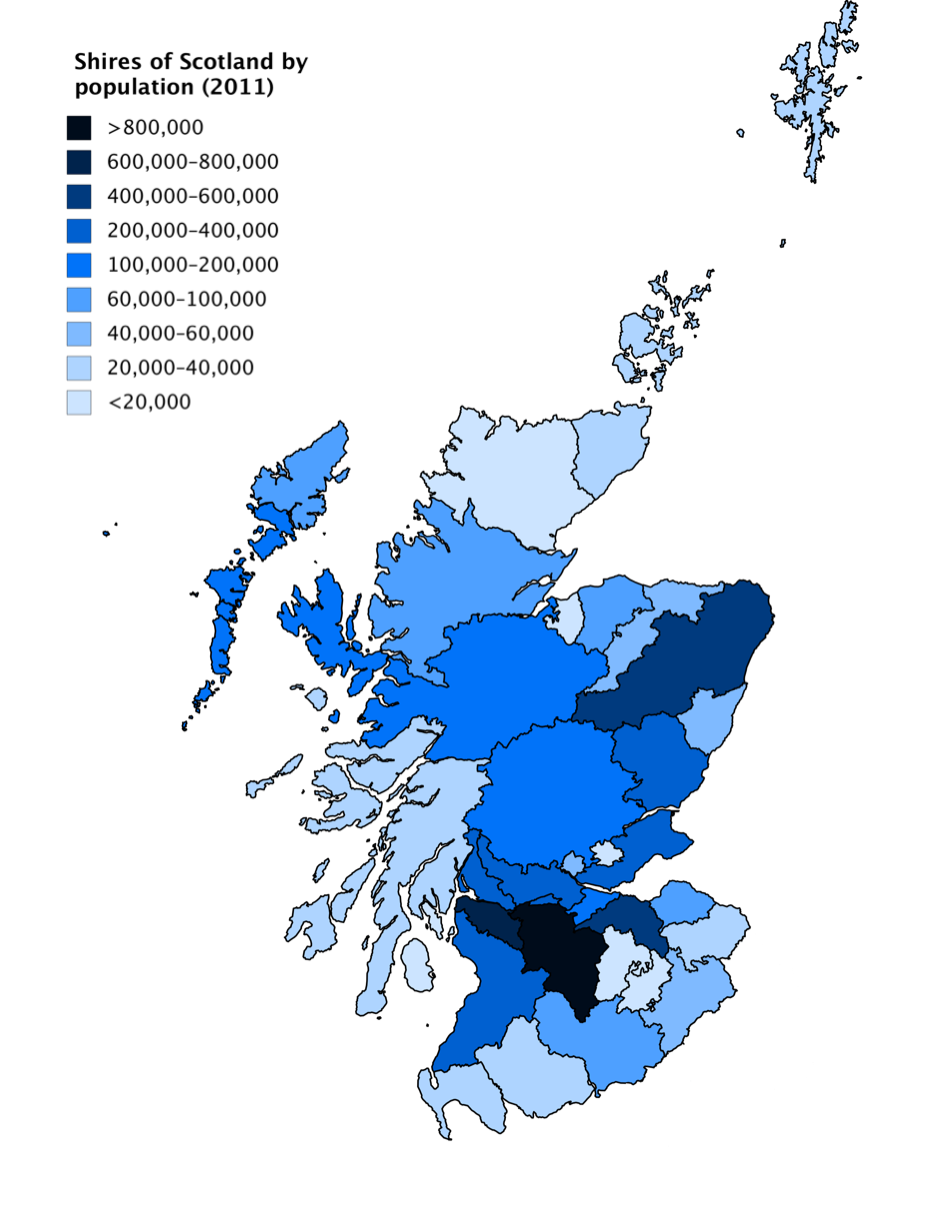
Counties of Scotland by population (2011)

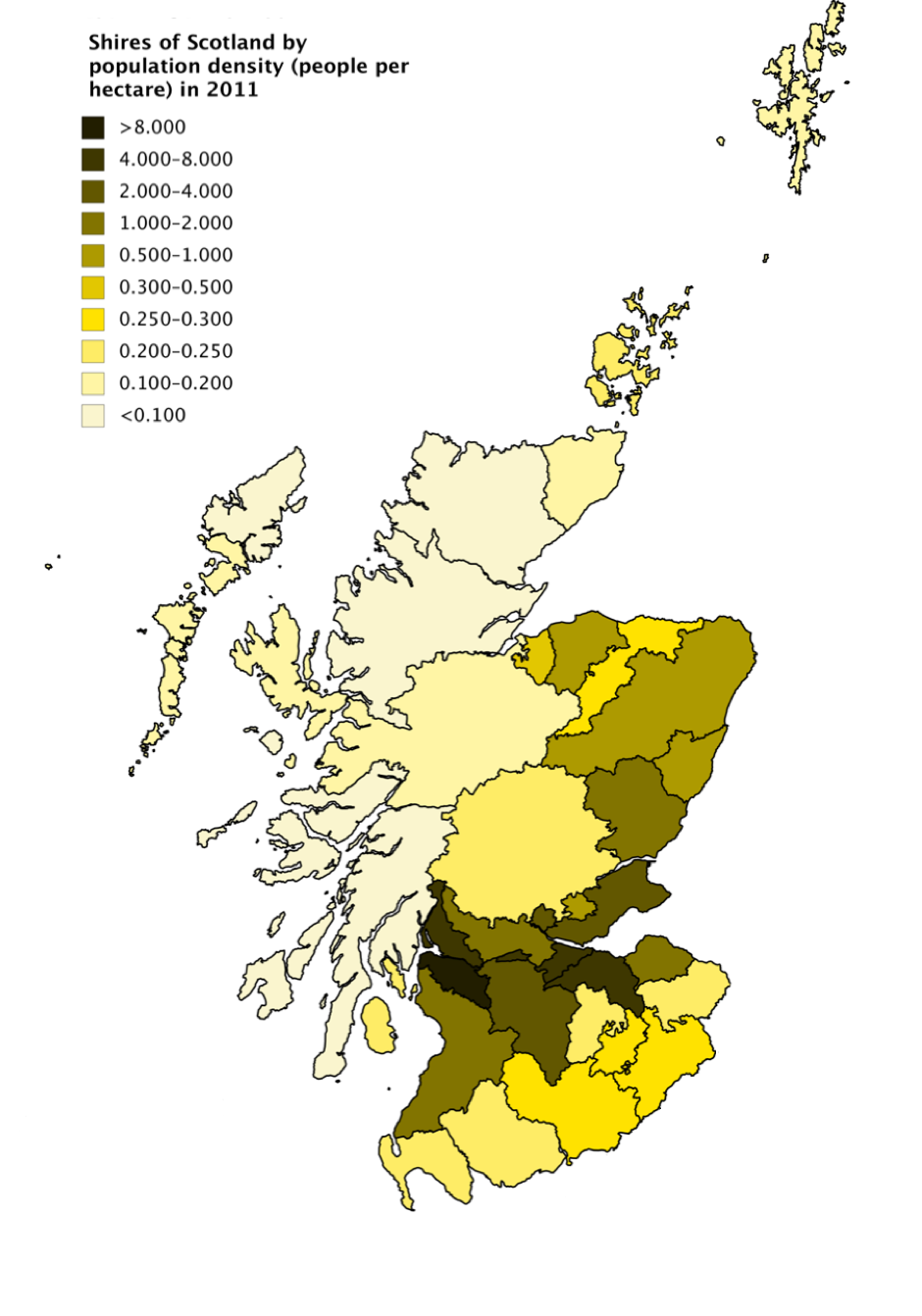
Counties of Scotland by population density (people per hectare) in 2011

=== Counties until 1889 ===
Counties of Scotland until 1889
1. Caithness; 2. Sutherland; 3. Ross-shire; 4. Cromartyshire; 5. Inverness-shire; 6. Nairnshire; 7. Elginshire; 8. Banffshire; 9. Aberdeenshire; 10. Kincardineshire; 11. Forfarshire; 12. Perthshire; 13. Argyll; 14. Buteshire; 15. Ayrshire; 16. Renfrewshire; 17. Dumbartonshire; 18. Stirlingshire; 19. Clackmannanshire; 20. Kinross-shire; 21. Fife; 22. Linlithgowshire; 23. Edinburghshire; 24. Haddingtonshire; 25. Berwickshire; 26. Roxburghshire; 27. Dumfriesshire; 28. Kirkcudbrightshire; 29. Wigtownshire; 30. Lanarkshire; 31. Selkirkshire; 32. Peeblesshire; Not shown: Zetland (Shetland) Orkney

=== Counties from 1889 to 1975 ===
Counties of Scotland from 1889 to 1975
1. Caithness; 2. Sutherland; 3. Ross and Cromarty; 4. Inverness-shire; 5. Nairnshire; 6. Moray (Elginshire until 1919); 7. Banffshire; 8. Aberdeenshire; 9. Kincardineshire; 10. Angus (Forfarshire until 1928); 11. Perthshire; 12. Argyll; 13. Buteshire; 14. Ayrshire; 15. Renfrewshire; 16. Dunbartonshire; 17. Stirlingshire; 18. Clackmannanshire; 19. Kinross-shire; 20. Fifeshire; 21. East Lothian (Haddingtonshire until 1921); 22. Midlothian (Edinburghshire until 1913); 23. West Lothian (Linlithgowshire until 1925); 24. Lanarkshire; 25. Peeblesshire; 26. Selkirkshire; 27. Berwickshire; 28. Roxburghshire; 29. Dumfriesshire; 30. Kirkcudbrightshire; 31. Wigtownshire; 32. Zetland (Shetland); 33. Orkney

== See also ==
- List of local government areas in Scotland (1930–1975)
- History of local government in the United Kingdom
- List of counties of Scotland in 1951 by population and by area
- List of counties of Scotland in 1971 by population
- List of Scottish counties by highest point
- List of burghs in Scotland
- Local government areas of Scotland (1975–1996)
- Lieutenancy areas of Scotland
- Subdivisions of Scotland
- List of places in Scotland
- Counties of the United Kingdom
