= County of Nairn =

Coordinates: 57°30′N 3°50′W

- Historic county
- Country: Scotland
- County town: Nairn

Area
  - Total: 200 sq mi (518 km^{2})
- Ranked 31st of 34
- Chapman code: NAI

The County of Nairn, or Nairnshire, (Scottish Gaelic: Siorrachd Inbhir Narann) is a historic county, registration county and lieutenancy area of Scotland. The county was named after Nairn, its only town. The county was used for local government until 1975 when the area was redesignated as the Nairn District, one of the eight districts of the two-tier Highland region. Nairn district was abolished in 1996 when Highland became a single-tier council area.

The county borders Inverness-shire to the west and south, Moray to the east, and has a coastline along the Moray Firth to its north.

== History ==
The area that would become Nairnshire was anciently part of the Province of Moray, ruled by the Earls or Mormaers of Moray, sometimes as a vassal of the Scottish crown, and at other times as a separate kingdom. The province was finally absorbed into the Kingdom of Scotland during the 12th century. In order to secure the Scottish crown's authority over the area, it was divided into shires, being areas administered by a sheriff. The old province of Moray was broadly split into the three shires of Elginshire, Nairnshire, and the mainland parts of Inverness-shire.

It is not known exactly when the shire of Nairn, administered by the Sheriff of Nairn, was created; there is some evidence that the area was initially included in Inverness-shire, but from the reign of William the Lion (reigned 1165–1214) there was a separate shire of Nairn. There was also a short-lived shire to the east centred on Forres, which in the early 14th century was grouped with Nairn, before later being united instead with Elginshire.

Over time, Scotland's shires became more significant than the old provinces, with more administrative functions being given to the sheriffs. In 1667 Commissioners of Supply were established for each shire, which would serve as the main administrative body for the area until the creation of county councils in 1890. Following the Acts of Union in 1707, the English term 'county' came to be used interchangeably with the older term 'shire'.

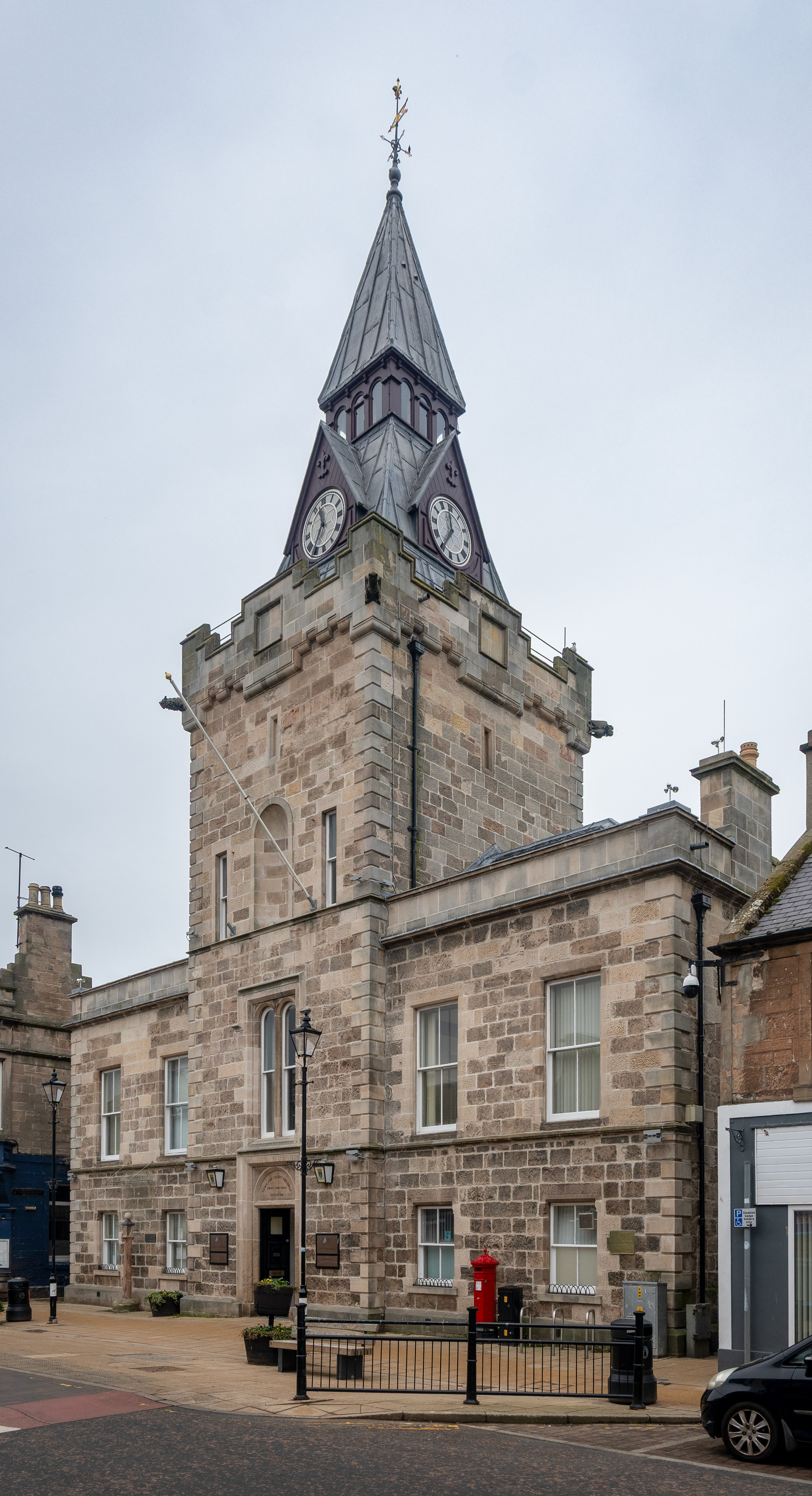
Nairn Town and County Buildings

Elected county councils were established in 1890 under the Local Government (Scotland) Act 1889, taking most of the functions of the commissioners (which were eventually abolished in 1930). Nairnshire County Council held its first meeting on 22 May 1890 at the Town and County Buildings in Nairn, the county's courthouse (built 1818) which also served as the meeting place for the commissioners and for the town council of the burgh of Nairn.

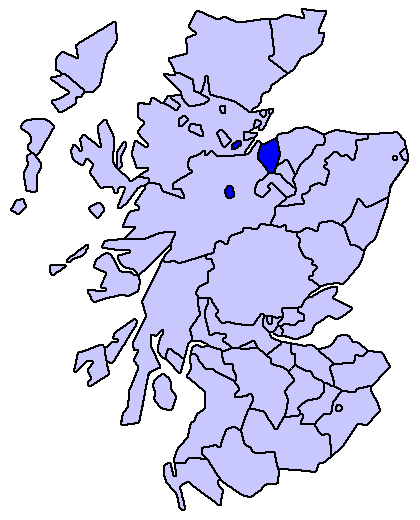
County of Nairn, To 1891

The 1889 Act also led to a review of boundaries to eliminate exclaves. There were several such changes affecting the boundaries of Nairnshire, which had five detached parts: three small areas surrounded by Elginshire, a larger area of moorland at Dunmaglass surrounded by Inverness-shire, and the small village of Urquhart on the Black Isle, surrounded by Ross and Cromarty. Each of these areas was transferred to the county which surrounded them. Parish and county boundaries were also adjusted such that each parish was in a single county, with the exception of the parish of Croy and Dalcross, which was exceptionally allowed to continue to straddle Inverness-shire and Nairnshire. The boundary changes all took effect in 1891.

In 1927 Nairnshire, along with many of Scotland's other counties, was granted a coat of arms by the Lord Lyon King of Arms, the governor of Scotland's heraldry. The arms was as follows: Or, a chevron gules, between two water-bougets in chief and a stag's head cabossed in base sable, three mullets argent. The motto was "unite and be mindful".

Nairnshire was the second least populous of the Scottish counties at the 1921 census, with fewer than 9,000 people. Due to its low population, the Local Government (Scotland) Act 1929 combined the county councils of Nairnshire and neighbouring Moray (as Elginshire had been renamed in 1919) for most purposes in 1930. The two councils continued to be elected as separate bodies, but operated together as the "Joint County Council of Moray and Nairn", serving the combined area of the two counties. Nairnshire County Council did perform some roles alone after 1930, notably acting as the district council for the parts of Nairnshire outside the burgh of Nairn.

Local government was reformed in 1975 under the Local Government (Scotland) Act 1973, which replaced Scotland's counties, burghs and landward districts with a two-tier structure of upper-tier regions and lower-tier districts. A new Nairn district was created covering the same area as the pre-1975 county. Nairn District Council was a lower-tier district level authority subordinate to the Highland Regional Council. A lieutenancy area covering the same area as the new district was created at the same time. Throughout the district council's existence a majority of the seats were held by independents. The district council met at the Town and County Buildings, as the old county council had done, with its offices in the adjoining building at 4 Courthouse Lane.

Further local government reforms in 1996 under the Local Government etc. (Scotland) Act 1994 saw the regions and districts created in 1975 abolished and replaced with single-tier council areas. The former Highland region became one of the new council areas. The Nairn lieutenancy area continues to be defined as the pre-1996 district of Nairn. The boundaries of the historic county of Nairnshire (as it was following the 1891 boundary changes) are still used for some limited official purposes connected with land registration, being a registration county.

The Highland Council has a number of area committees for debating local matters. One of the committees is called the Nairnshire Committee, comprising the councillors who represent the Nairn and Cawdor ward, which broadly corresponds to the pre-1975 county.

== Geography ==
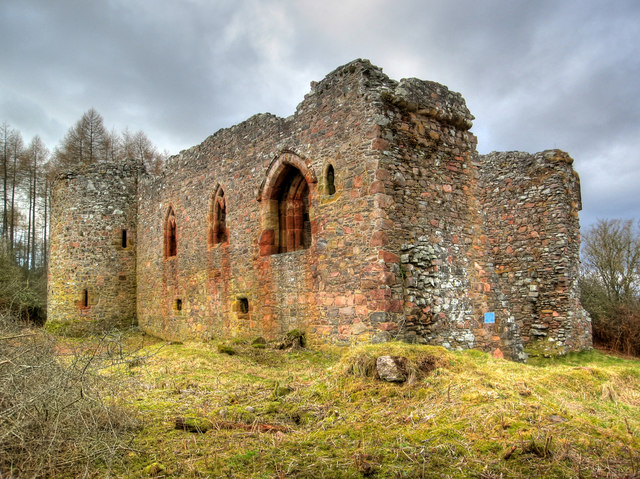
The 13th-century Rait Castle, near Nairn

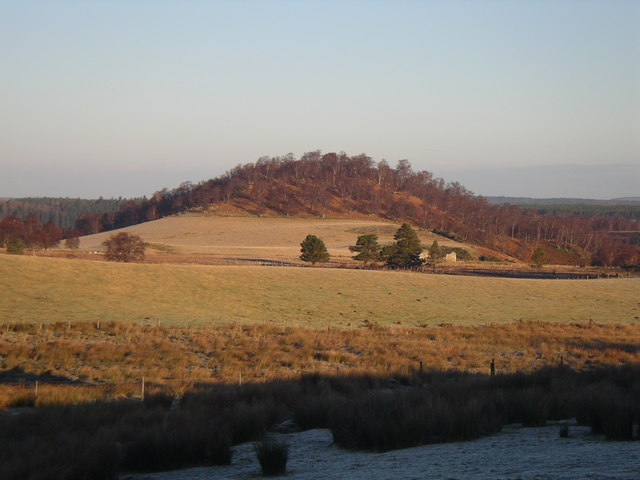
Dunearn hill fort

Nairnshire is about 22 miles in length and 15 miles in breadth (35×24 km); comprising an area of 200 square miles (520 km^{2}), or 128,000 acres. The county consists of a flattish coastal region where the vast majority of the population live, with a sparsely populated hilly interior, rising to the foothills of the Grampian Mountains in the south. These moorlands reach 634 m (2,080 ft) at Carn nam Bain-tighearna, on the county march (boundary) just east of Slochd summit on the A9. There is no old-established name for these heights, but they have been termed the "Nairnshire Hills". The coast forms an arc shape, with the Whiteness Head peninsula in the west and The Bar peninsula in the east. The main rivers are the River Nairn and the Findhorn, which both follow deeply incised courses across the general slope northwards. The chief bodies of water are Loch Loy, Cran Loch, Clunas Reservoir, Loch of Boath and Loch Kirkcaldy.

Nairn can be seen from several distant points such as Ben Rinnes, a peak that is a common point of distant view to such places as Inverness-shire and Longman Hill in Banffshire. To the north, Nairn is bounded by the Moray Firth.

=== Civil parishes ===
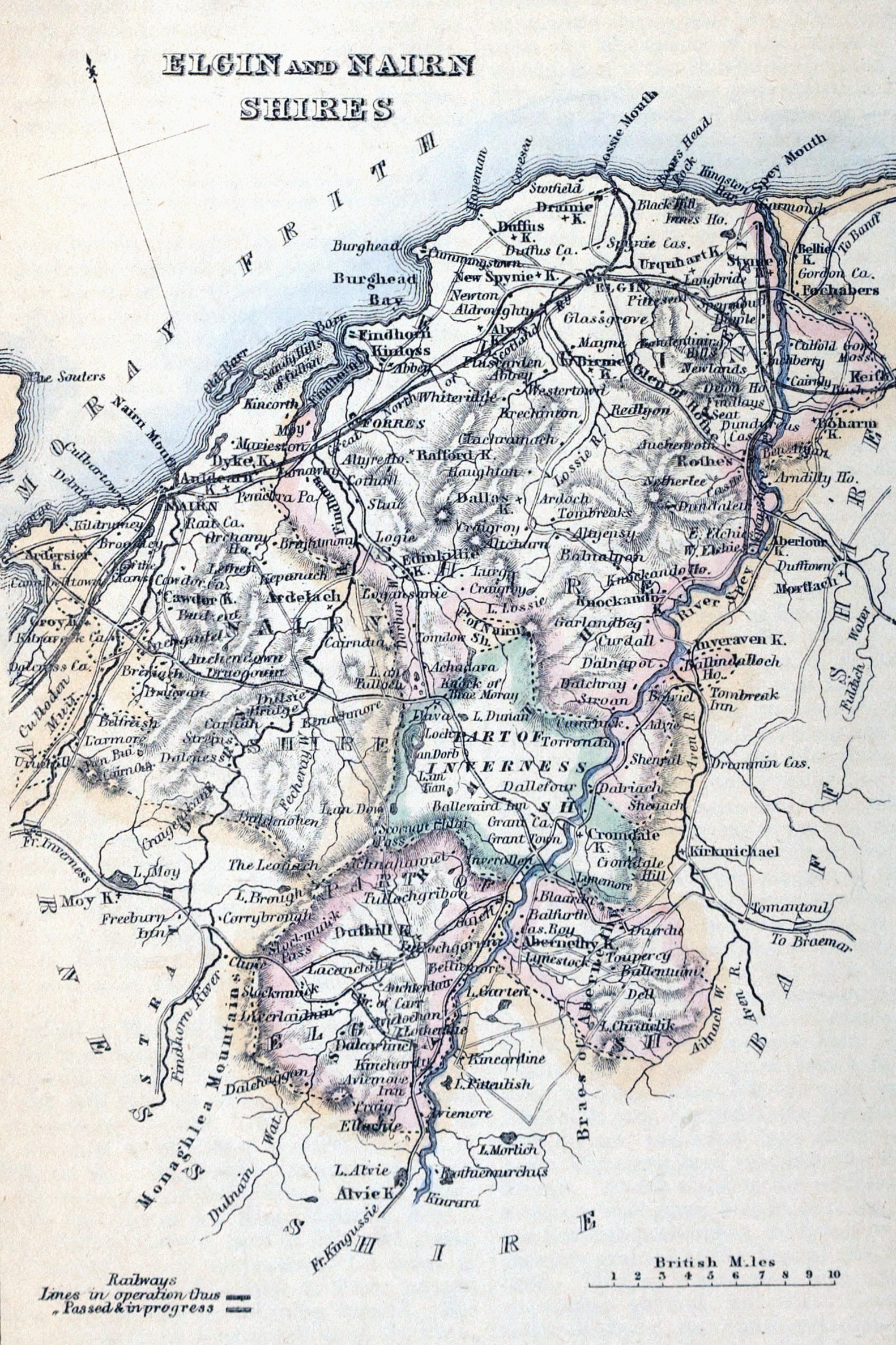
Nairnshire c.1851

Civil parishes are still used for some statistical purposes, and separate census figures are published for them. As their areas have been largely unchanged since the 19th century this allows for comparison of population figures over an extended period of time.

The county consisted of the royal burgh of Nairn (chartered in 1476), the four parishes of Ardclach, Auldearn, Dyke & Moy and Nairn; and most of the parish of Cawdor (also known as Calder), and parts of those of: Croy & Dalcross; Moy & Dalarossie; Petty; and Urquhart & Logie Wester.

== Parliamentary constituencies ==
The parliamentary constituency for the Westminster Parliament is Inverness, Nairn, Badenoch and Strathspey and the MP is Drew Hendry of the Scottish National Party.

The parliamentary constituency for the Scottish Parliament is Inverness and Nairn, represented by Fergus Ewing MSP.

== Transport ==
The Aberdeen–Inverness railway line runs through the north of the county west–east.

== Settlements ==
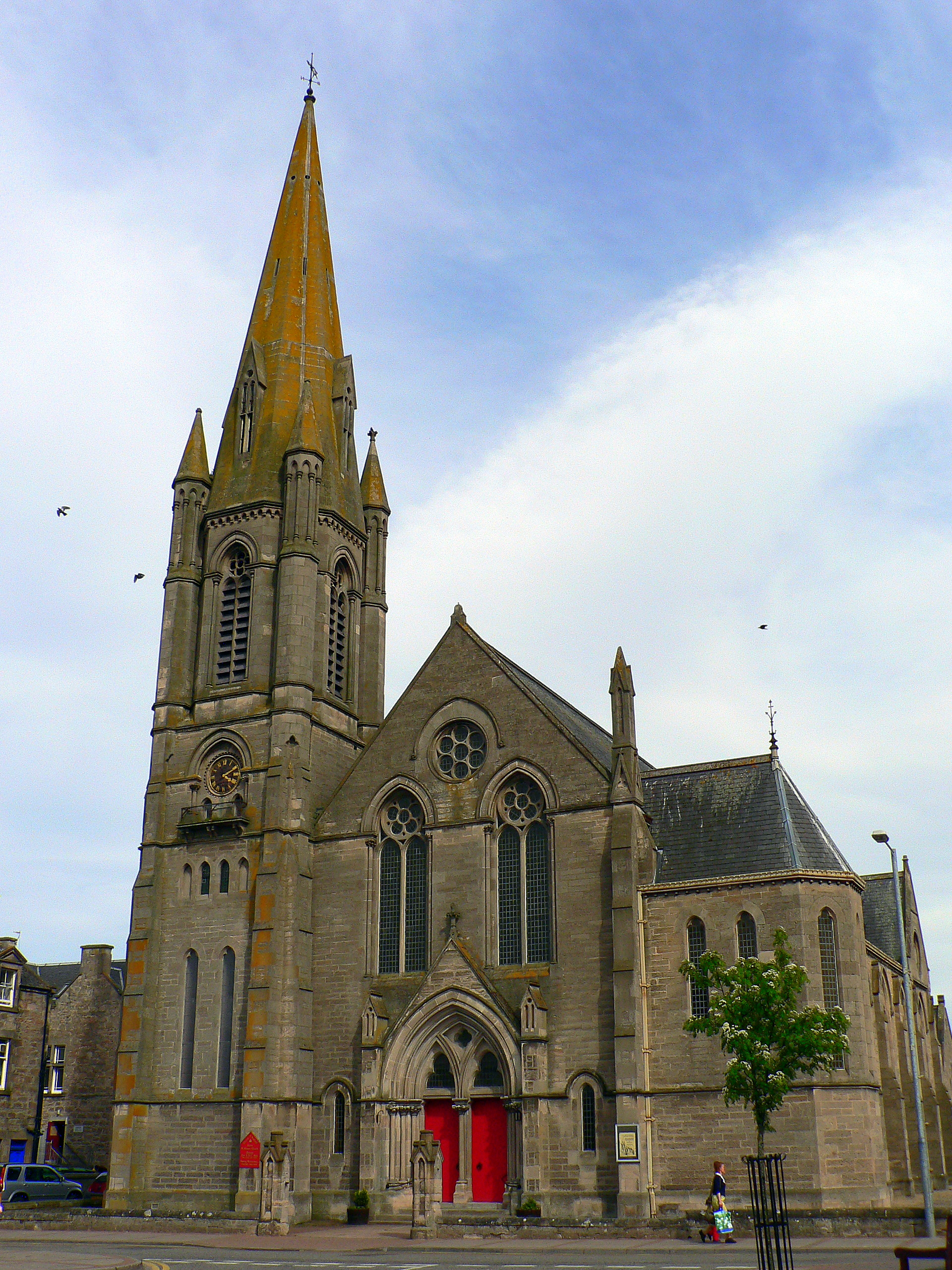
Church in Nairn

- Ardclach
- Auldearn
- Cawdor
- Clephanton
- Culcharry
- Delnies
- Ferness
- Firhall
- Geddes
- Glenferness
- Littlemill
- Nairn
- Piperhill
- Regoul
