= Lord Lieutenant of Nairn =

Ceremonial officer in Nairn, Scotland

The Lord Lieutenant of Nairn, is the British monarch's personal representative in the Nairn lieutenancy area in Scotland.

== History ==
Prior to 1975 the lieutenant was appointed to the county of Nairn, also known as Nairnshire. The county was abolished as an administrative area in 1975 and replaced by a local government district called Nairn covering the same area as the pre-1975 county. Nairn district formed part of the Highland Region. The lieutenancy area was redefined in 1975 to match the district.

The district was abolished in 1996, but the lieutenancy area continues to be defined as being the area of the district as it was prior to its abolition in 1996. The lieutenancy area is named 'Nairn' in the 1996 statutory instrument which most recently confirmed the area's definition, although the term 'Nairnshire' is also sometimes used in official announcements about it.

== List of Lord Lieutenants of Nairn ==
- Hugh Rose, 15th of Kilravock, 1729– 23 January 1732
- James Brodie, 21st of Brodie 17 March 1794 – 17 January 1824
- William Brodie, 22nd of Brodie 9 February 1824 – 6 June 1873
- James Campbell John Brodie, 12th of Lethen 25 June 1873 – 25 February 1880
- Hugh Fife Ashley Brodie, 23rd of Brodie 25 March 1880 – 20 September 1889
- James Rose, 23rd of Kilravock 22 November 1889 – 16 November 1903
- Ian Ashley Morton Brodie, 24th of Brodie 6 November 1903 – 1935
- Archibald Leslie-Melville, 13th Earl of Leven 8 July 1935 – 15 January 1947
- John Grahame Buchanan Allardyce 16 April 1947 – 21 September 1949
- Hon. Ian Malcolm Campbell 5 December 1949 – 1958
- James Erskine Stirling 4 December 1958 – 20 December 1968
- Alexander Leslie-Melville, 14th Earl of Leven 22 July 1969 – 1999
- Ewen John Brodie, 16th of Lethen 9 November 1999 – 16 December 2017
- George Russell Asher 19 January 2018 – present
