= Enard Bay =

Large remote tidal coastal embayment in Ross and Cromarty, Scotland

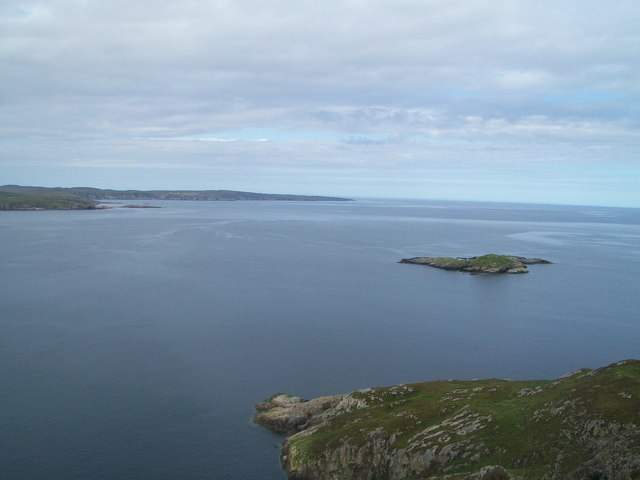
- Green Island and Enard Bay from the mountain Creag na Speirag.

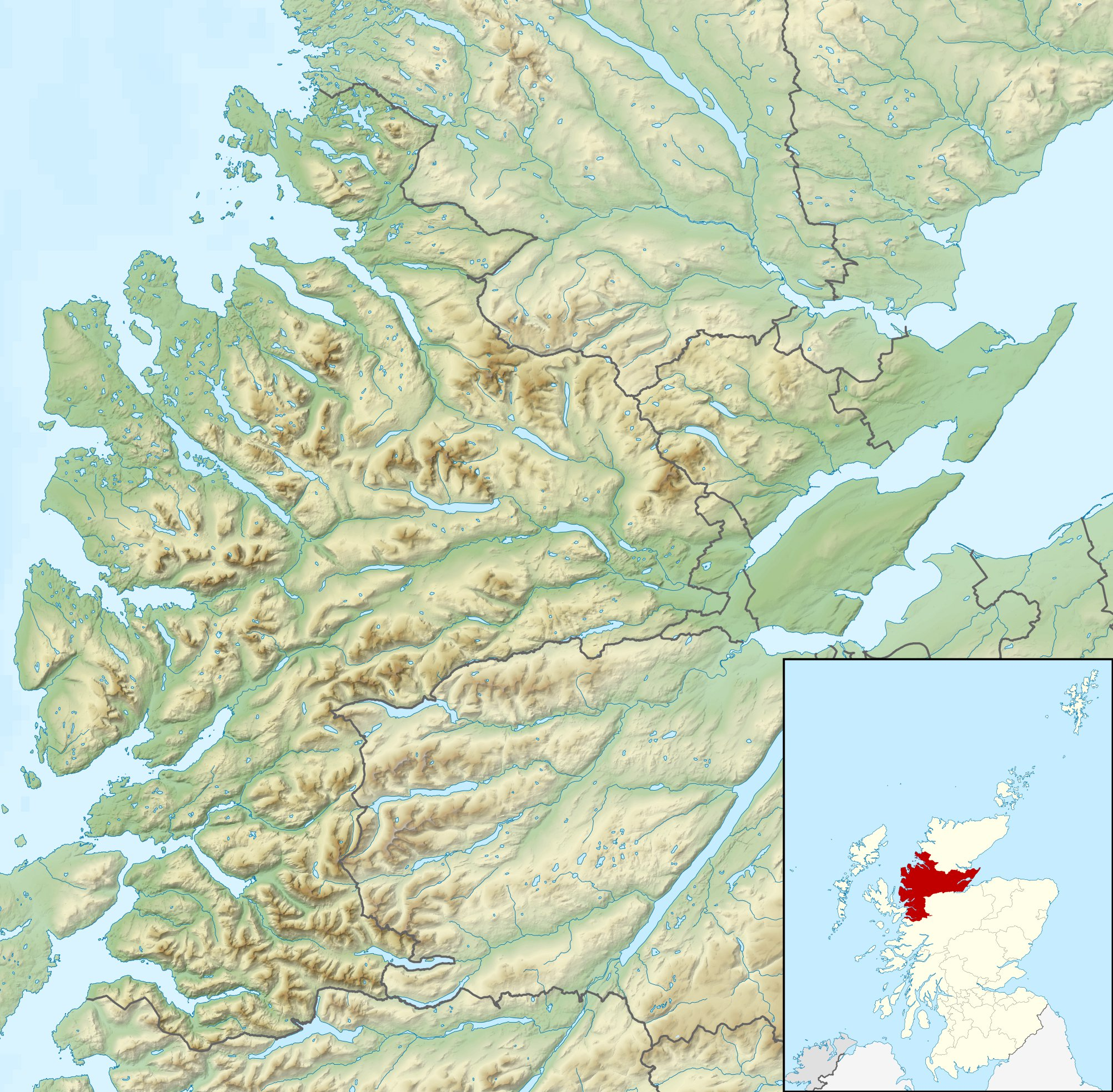
- Location within Ross and Cromarty
- Location: Ross and Cromarty, Scotland
- Coordinates: 58°05′45″N 5°20′11″W
- River sources: River Polly
- Ocean/sea sources: The Minch
- Basin countries: Scotland
- Max. length: 7.4 km (4.6 mi)
- Max. width: 8.85 km (5.50 mi)
- Islands: Eilean Mòr

Enard Bay is a large remote tidal coastal embayment, located 10.5 miles northwest of Ullapool, in northwestern Ross and Cromarty, Scottish Highlands in the west coast of Scotland. The mouth of the bay is about 4.5 miles across running from the head of Rubha Mòr peninsula at Rubna Na CòiGeach (English:Ru Coygach) point to Rubna Na Brèige (English:Kirkaig point) to the east.

== Settlements ==
In the coast of the bay, which travels almost on a north bearing downwards in diagonal from west to east has a number of settlements, the principle settlement is Lochinver, which is located on its inlet to the north west.

== Geography ==
Enard Bay is bounded by Rhuba Mòr peninsula that runs from the northwest to the southeast in the south. To the south of Rhuba Mòr lies the Summer Isles and further which is in the verdant and ancient shire of Argyll, whose old name was A’ Chleit.

On the west most south coast of Enard Bay, before the coast bears northwest is an inlet that forms into Enard Bay from Achnahaird Bay. At the head of Achnahaird Bay is a large white sandy beach. To the east of Achnahaird Bay is Garvie Bay, with a small sandy beach. Slightly Further east is the small Lag na Saille inlet. Polly bay is further to the east and north, close to the small rocky Green island. To the north of Polly bay is the sea loch, Loch an Èisg Brachaidh located to the west of the group of small islands.

The bay has a number of small islands, of which Eilean Mòr, located on the northeast corner of the bay is the largest. Fraochlan Island located less than quarter mile north is the next smallest, followed by the Eilean Mòineseach. Green Island is a small island located to the south in the southeast of the bay.

A number of small fast flowing streams flow into the bay, the biggest amongst them is the River Polly, which flows into the Polly bay inlet.

The sea lochs, Loch Inver and much larger Loch Kirkaig are located to the north of the bay.

== Gallery ==
Images of Enard Bay and surrounding areas

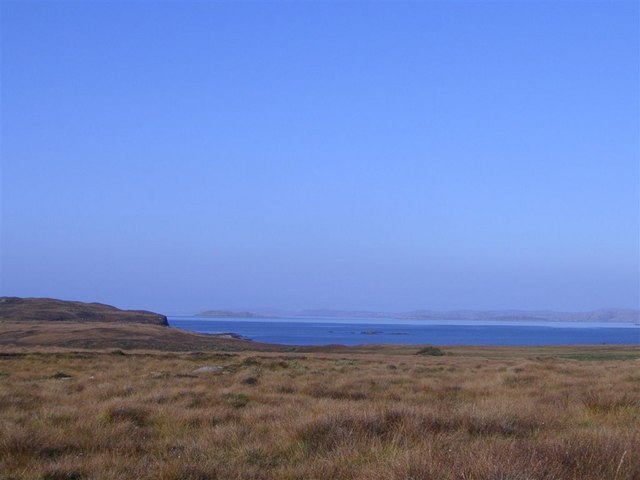
From the Achiltibuie Road Looking across Garvie Bay, up to Enard Bay; the island is probably Eilan Mor, with Green Island towards the right.

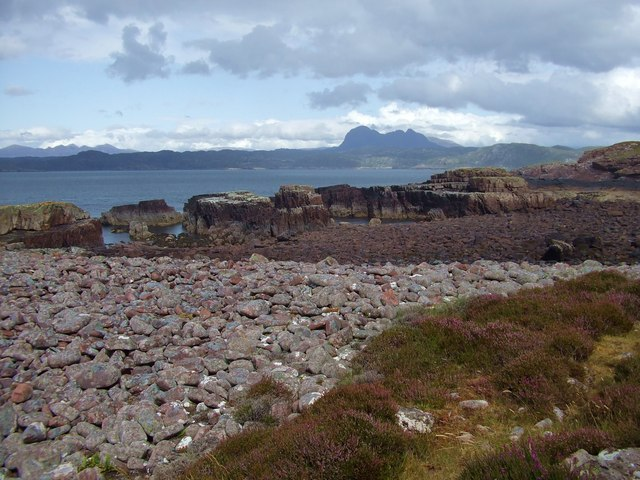
Rubh a Choin Rocky shoreline near the end of the peninsula between Garvie and Achnahaird bays. Suilven in the distance across Enard Bay.

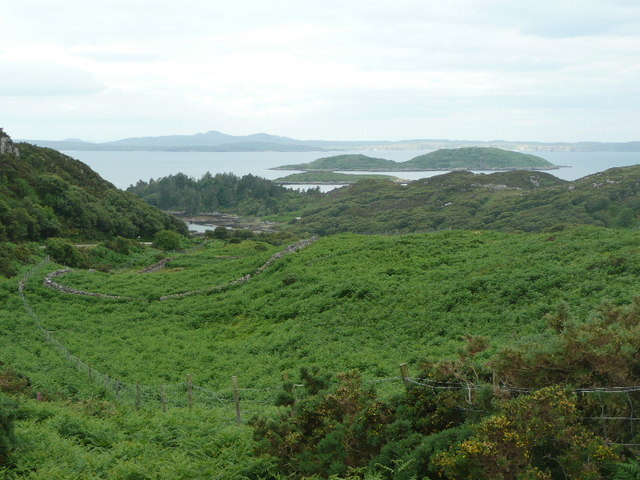
Bracken slopes down to Loch an Eisg-brachaidh The islands in Enard Bay beyond.

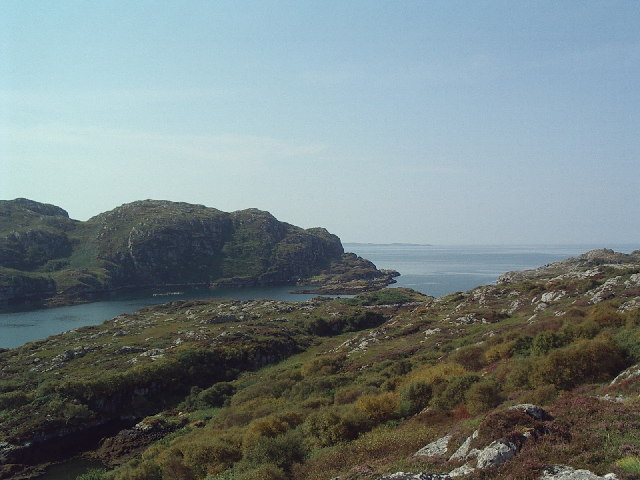
Loch Roe. Looking south over the entrance to Loch Roe with Enard Bay in the west. The headland in the distance is Rubha na Coigich.

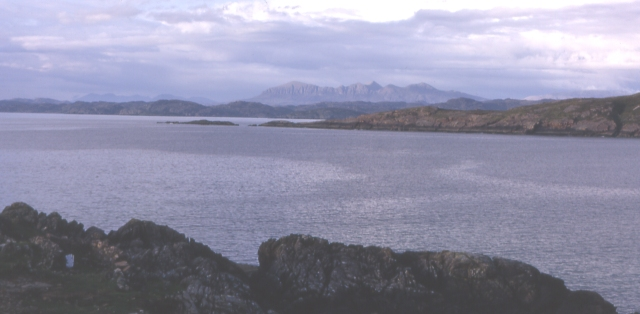
Quinag from Achnahaird. A glint of sunshine picks out the ridge of Quinag across Enard Bay from Achnahaird.

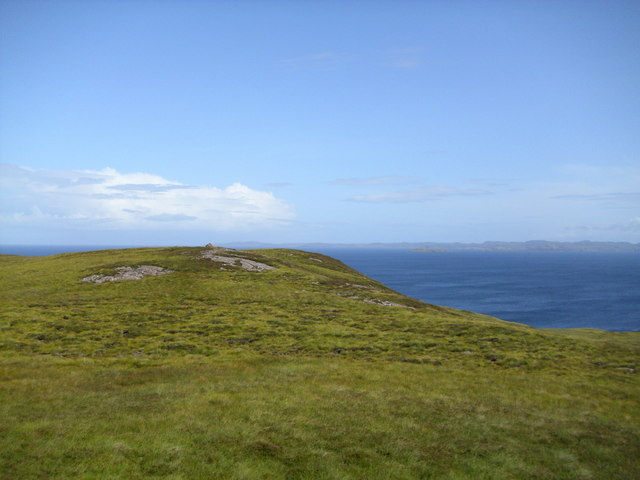
Cnoc Mor is a low ridge reaching 72m above sea level overlooking Achnahaird and Enard Bays. Looking in a northerly direction towards the coast near Stoer.

== See also ==
- List of lochs in Scotland
