= Conival =

Mountain in Assynt, Scotland

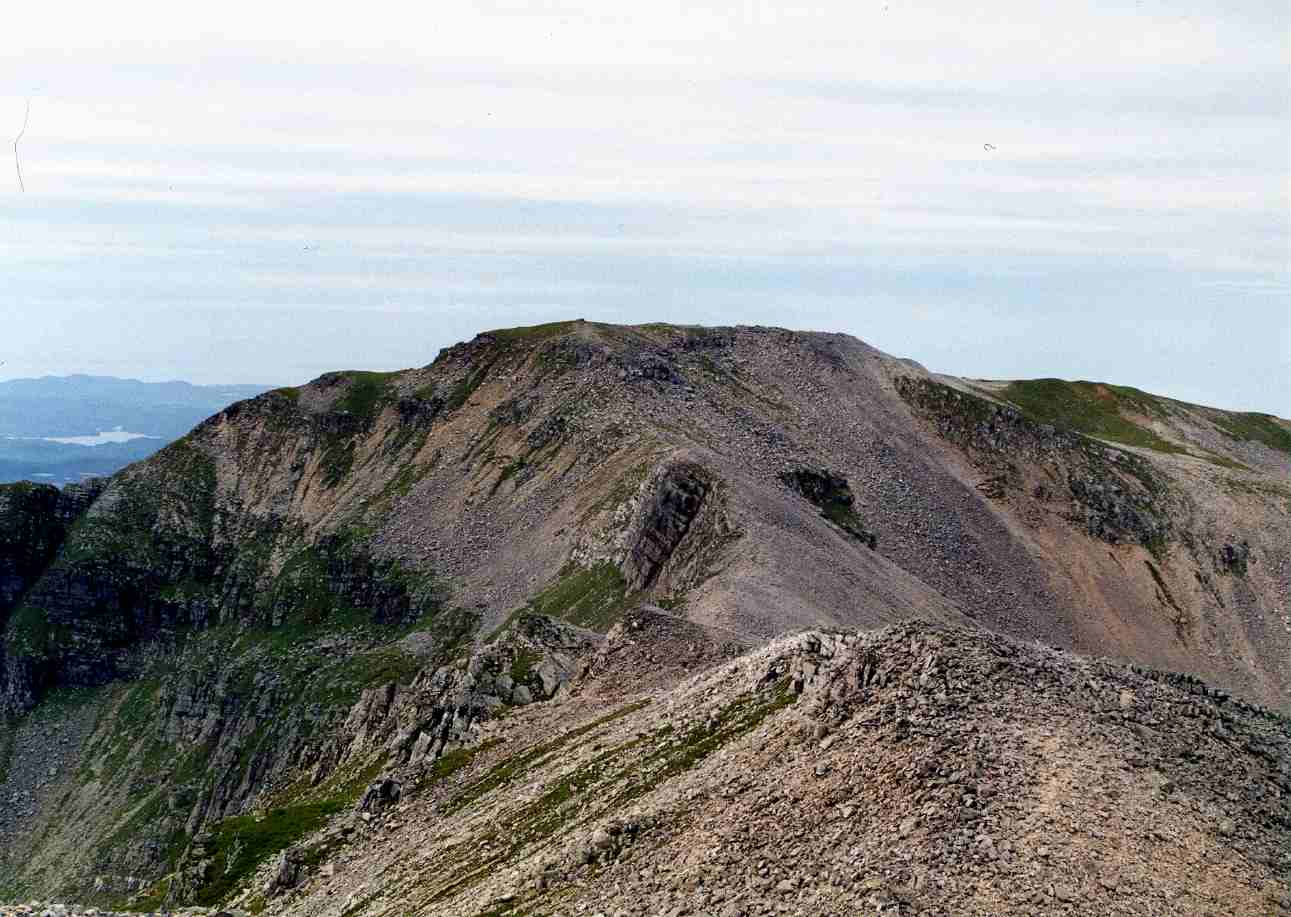
- Conival seen from Ben More Assynt.

Highest point
- Elevation: 987 m (3,238 ft)
- Prominence: 101 m (331 ft)
- Listing: Munro
- Coordinates: 58°08′09″N 4°53′00″W

Naming
- Native name: Scottish Gaelic: Conmheall
- English translation: Adjoining Hill or Hill of Meeting
- Pronunciation: Scottish Gaelic: [ˈkʰɔn̪ˠəvjal̪ˠ]

Geography
- Location: Assynt, Scotland
- Parent range: Northwest Highlands
- OS grid: NC303199
- Topo map: OS Landranger 15, OS Explorer 442

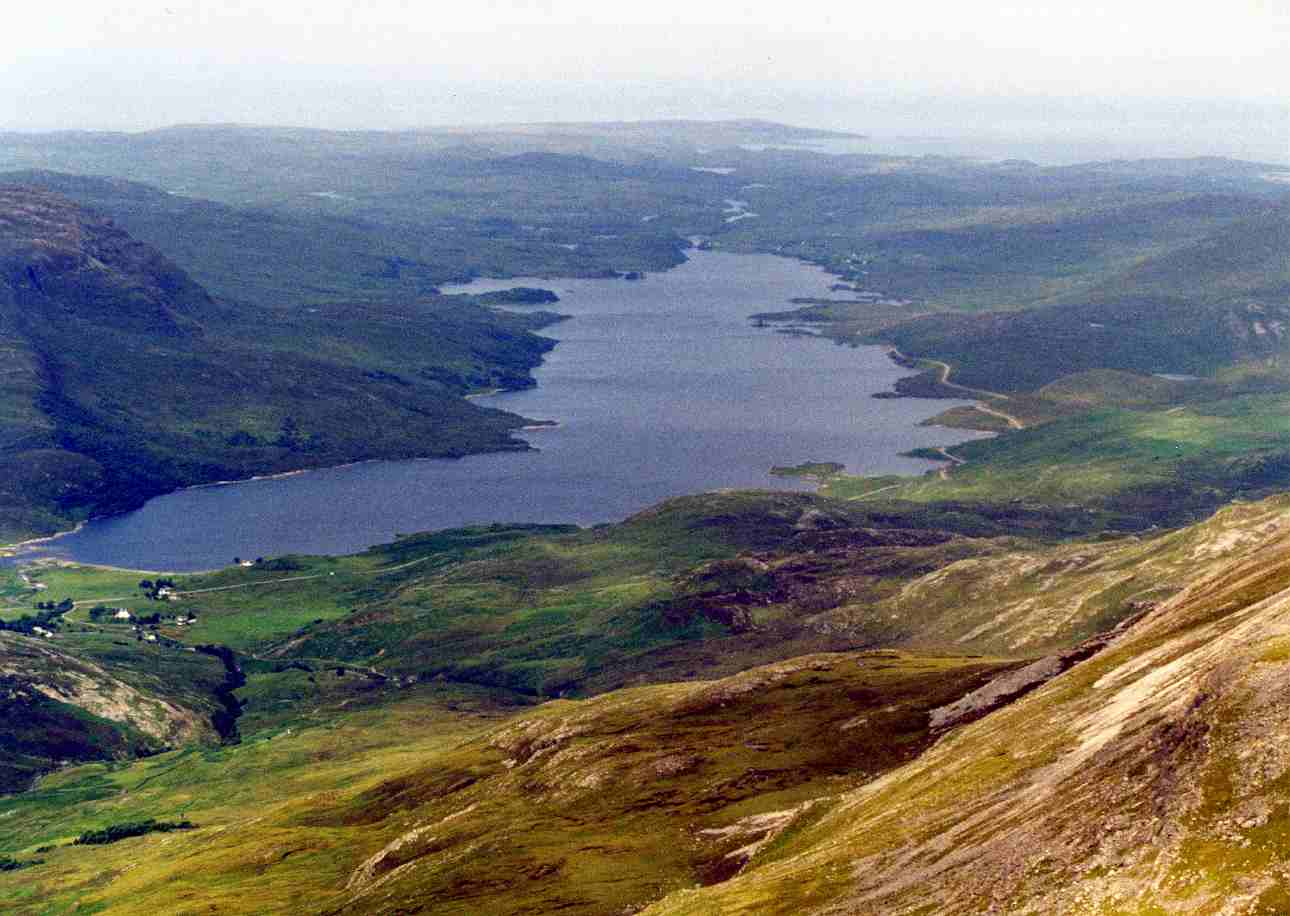
Loch Assynt seen from Conival summit.

Conival (Scottish Gaelic: Conmheall) is a Scottish mountain situated in Assynt in the Sutherland area of the Highland Council Area, thirty kilometres (twenty miles) north-northeast of Ullapool.

== Overview ==
Conival is a distinct landmark when viewed from the A837 road to the west from where its conspicuous 600-metre-high (2,000 ft) western face is well seen; this flank is made up of light coloured and distinctive Cambrian quartzite rock thickened by geological thrusting. The mountain reaches a height of 987 metres (3,238 feet) and is classified as a Munro. It is connected to the adjoining and better known Munro of Ben More Assynt (Beinn Mhòr Asainn) which lies 1.5 km (1 mi) to the east by a high, rough quartzite ridge. Conival has a rich diversity of attractions on its slopes making it popular not just with walkers but also geologists, biologists and speleologists.

The mountain's name is slightly enigmatic in its meaning. The name does not originate from the Norse language like many of the hills in the Assynt area; it does in fact derive from Gaelic. It was called Conamheall in the original 1891 publication of Munro's Tables, which translates as “adjoining hill” or “hill of meeting” (a reduced form of Gaelic coinneamh "meeting", and in prepositional constructions "opposite, facing", plus meall "round hill") which is probably the correct translation as it describes its close connection to Ben More Assynt. Between 1921 and 1969 the mountain was called Cona-mheall which translates as “enchanted hill”. Since 1974 it has been called by its anglicised name of Conival.

== Geography and geology ==
Conival is part of the Ben More Assynt Site of Special Scientific Interest because of its outstanding geological features, it displays the Moine Thrust Belt clearly on its slopes, this is an upthrust of rocks caused by tectonic plate collision during the Silurian period. There are good examples of limestone pavement on the lower western flank of the mountain in the valley of the River Traligill. Conival also lies within the UNESCO endorsed North West Highlands Geopark and the Inchnadamph National Nature Reserve. The underlying limestone within the reserve creates ideal conditions for rare plants like mountain avens, frog orchid and holly fern.

Conival consists of a main ridge which runs on an axis from north west to south east. The NW ridge connects to the subsidiary summit of Beinn an Fhurain with its highest point known as Na Tuadhan (852 metres). Na Tuadhan is an important geological area displaying spectacular folds of Cambrian quartzites exposed by the Moine Thrust on its southern cliffs above Coire a' Mhadaidh. The SSE ridge descends to Glen Oykel and this also displays “fantastic geology”. A spur runs south west off the SSE ridge to cross a col (Bealach Traligill) that connect to the neighbouring Corbett of Breabag. A third ridge goes east to connect to Ben More Assynt, this ridge is rough underfoot with quartzite boulders and the traverse between the two Munros takes more time than expected even though there is a drop and re-ascent of only 113 metres (371 ft).

Conival lies on the main east-west watershed of Scotland with drainage from its slopes reaching both coasts. The southern slopes are drained by the River Oykel which flows to the Dornoch Firth on the eastern coast. Streams on the northern flanks also go east to the Dornoch Firth via Loch Shin while the western slopes are drained by the River Traligill which flows west through Loch Assynt to find the sea at Lochinver.

== Ascents and the summit ==
The usual route of ascent for Conival starts at Inchnadamph at grid reference NC251216 where there is parking space near the Inchnadamph hotel. The route follows the valley of the River Traligill passing the Cnoc nan Uamh cave system located within a band of Cambrian limestone. These caves have a length of 1.4 km (7/8 mi) and show the earliest traces of human habitation in Scotland from about 6000 BC. The route continues to the source of the river at the col between Beinn an Fhurain and Conival from where it is a rough climb up quartzite scree to the summit. Most walkers will continue on to Ben More Assynt, 1.5 km (15/16 mi) to the east.

An alternative ascent for strong walkers is to tackle the entire ridge from north to south including the two Munros plus the Corbetts of Glas Bheinn in the north and Breabag to the south. The summit of Conival is a mass of disintegrating quartzite marked by a large circular wind shelter which has been built around the remains of an OS trig point (all that remains is the base). The view from the top gives an impressive panorama to the west taking in the hills of Quinag, Canisp and Cul Mor as well as an end on view of Loch Assynt (see photo).

== References and footnotes ==
- The Munros, Scottish Mountaineering Trust, 1986, Donald Bennett (Editor) ISBN 0-907521-13-4
- The High Mountains of Britain and Ireland, Diadem, 1993, Irvine Butterfield, ISBN 0-906371-30-9
- 100 Best Routes on Scottish Mountains, Warner Books, 1992, Ralph Storer, ISBN 0-7515-0300-2
- Hamish’s Mountain Walk, Baton Wicks, 1996, Hamish Brown, ISBN 1-898573-08-5
- The Munros in Winter, David & Charles, 1986, Martin Moran, ISBN 0-7153-8836-3
- The Munros Almanac, Neil Wilson Publishing, 1991, Cameron McNeish, ISBN 1-897784-01-5

Footnotes
