= Zip 'n Zoo =

2008 British short film

- Promotional Poster
- Directed by: Bruce Robertson
- Starring: John Hannah; Simone Lahbib; Remy Bennett
- Cinematography: Kenneth Simpson
- Music by: Charlie McKerron
- Production company: Blue Planet Productions
- Release date: 1 September 2008
- Running time: 29 minutes
- Country: United Kingdom
- Language: English

Zip 'n Zoo is a 2008 British short film directed by Bruce Robertson and starring John Hannah, Simone Lahbib and Remy Bennett. The name of the film is derived from the sound of casting during fly-fishing.

== Plot ==
Fly-fishing expert, prize fiddle player and local school teacher Tom (Hannah) and his wife Marion (Lahbib) share an idyllic life in the Scottish Highlands, with only a baby to wish for. When 19-year-old New Yorker Natalie (Bennett) arrives in town claiming to be Tom's daughter, the village gets more than the odd tune to entertain them.

== Production ==
The film was made by Blue Planet Productions and runs for 29 minutes.

Zip 'n Zoo was filmed in the landscape of Assynt in Sutherland, north west Scotland. The mountains of Quinag, Canisp, Suilven, Cùl Mòr, Stac Pollaidh and Ben More Assynt provide the backdrop for the opening sequence. The sequences in the shop, pub and school were filmed in the village of Drumbeg, and the fishing scenes on Loch Drumbeg. Sequences were also filmed in the nearby village of Culkein Drumbeg. The scenes in Durness are Loch Croispol Bookshop and The John Lennon Memorial Garden.
