= Strathan, Sutherland =

Coordinates: 58.14118°N 5.25696°W

Strathan: Scottish Gaelic: Srathan
- Location within the Sutherland area
- OS grid reference: NC083215
- Council area: Highland
- Lieutenancy area: Sutherland
- Country: Scotland
- Sovereign state: United Kingdom
- Post town: Lairg
- Postcode district: IV27 4
- Police: Scotland
- Fire: Scottish
- Ambulance: Scottish

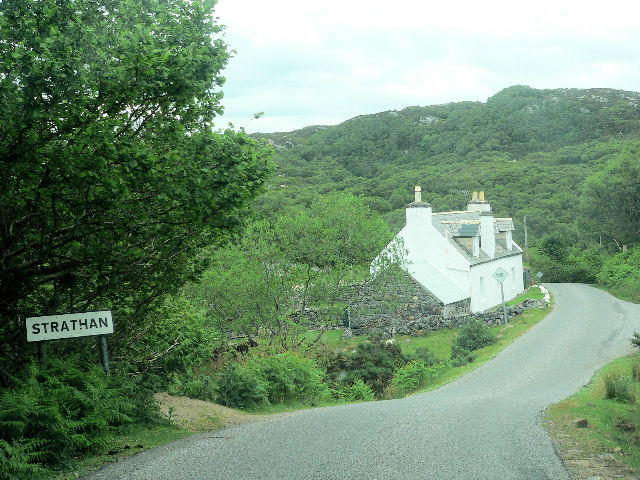
Entrance to Strathan village

Strathan is a remote scattered coastal village, located in Bàgh an t-strathain Bay, which lies on the south shore of the sea loch, Loch Inver, in the Assynt district of the west coast of Sutherland, Scottish Highlands and is in the Scottish council area of Highland. Strathan is situated less than 1 mile northeast of Badnaban, 1 mile north of Inverkirkaig, and 2 miles southwest of Lochinver
