= Loch Kirkaig =

Small tidal sea loch in Scotland

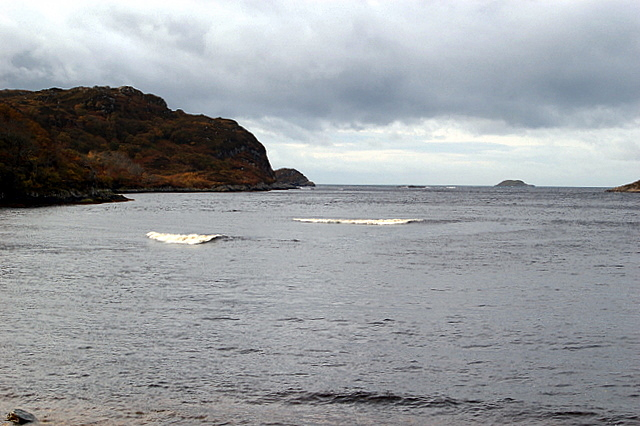
- Looking down the length of Loch Kirkaig with the tiny twin islets of Sgeir Mhòr visible in the distance.

- Location within Sutherland
- Location: Sutherland, Scotland
- Coordinates: 58.126347°N 5.289161°W
- River sources: River Kirkaig
- Ocean/sea sources: Atlantic Ocean
- Basin countries: Scotland
- Max. length: 2.15 km (1.34 mi)
- Max. width: 1.95 km (1.21 mi)
- Average depth: 20 metres (66 ft)
- Settlements: Inverkirkaig

Loch Kirkaig is a small tidal sea loch, located in the region and parish of Assynt in south-west of Sutherland, in the west coast of Scotland and in the Scottish Highlands. Loch Kirkaig is 1.25 miles south of Loch Inver. The scattered crofting township of Inverkirkaig is located at the headland of the bay, next to the pebbly beach, on the round bay, which has no known name. The name Kirgaig comes from old Norse, Kirkju-vik meaning church bay, perhaps suggesting that in Viking times, there was a church, with a village located in the bay.

== Settlements ==
Inverkirkaig lies at the head of the sea loch, surrounding a small sand and pebble beach. The principal settlement in the area is the village of Lochinver in Assynt, which is located 2 km northwest of the beach, along the unnamed coast road.

== Geography ==
Loch Kirkaig is bounded by Kirkaig point in the north, and Ribha na Brèige point.

Loch Kirkaig is fed by the River Kirkaig, which drains the lochs of Fionn Loch, Loch Veyatie, Cam Loch Loch á Chapuil, and indirectly Loch nan Ràc, Loch Borralan and Loch Urigill. Travelling in a southeasterly direction along the River Kirkaig through a wooded glen, is the natural wonder and tourist attraction, the 20m Falls of Kirkaig.

The small island of Sgeir Mhòr is located close to the southern coast of the bay.

== Gallery ==
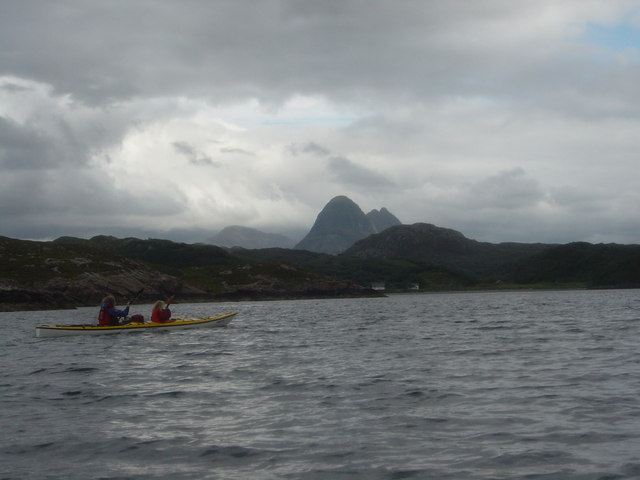
Paddling up Loch Kirkaig Returning to Inverkirkaig in two double sea kayaks, passing close along the north shore of Loch Kirkaig. Suilven lies inland brooding under an overcast sky just starting to clear after a windy morning

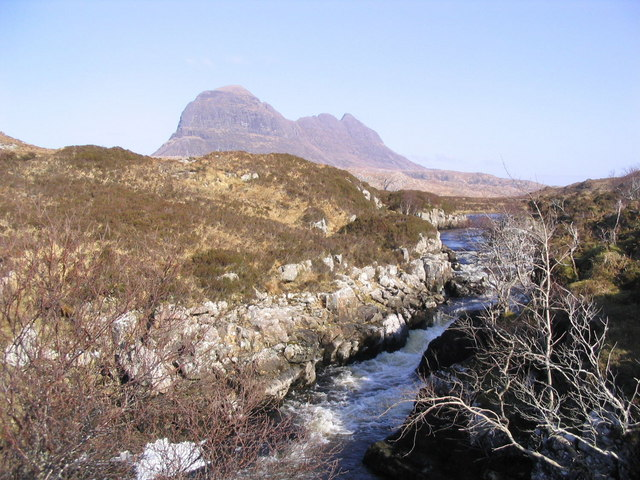
River Kirkaig where the river flows out of Fionn Loch with the imposing peak and most distinctive mountain of Suilven at 731 m, visible in the distance. It can't be seen from the bay, due to undergrowth and small undulating hills.

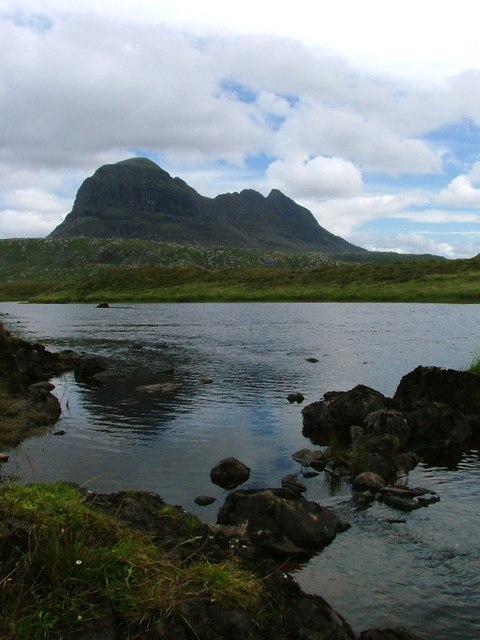
River Kirkaig. For a short distance after it leaves Fionn Loch the river meanders before garthering speed and tumbling down the Falls of Kirkaig. Caisteal Laith the highest summit of Suilven dominates the scene.

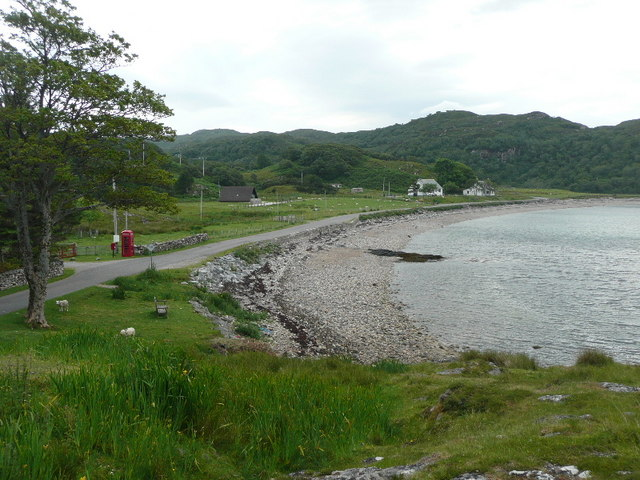
Inverkirkaig On the shore of Loch Kirkaig with pebbly beach.

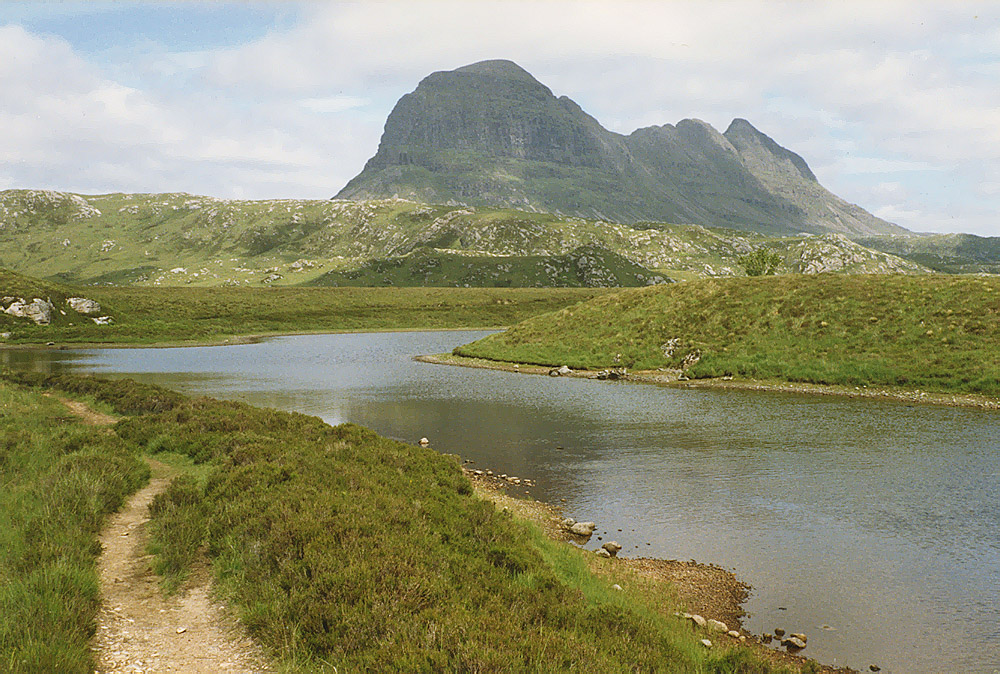
The start of the River Kirkaig The outflow from Fionn Loch where the River Kirkaig commences. Suilven can be seen in the distance.

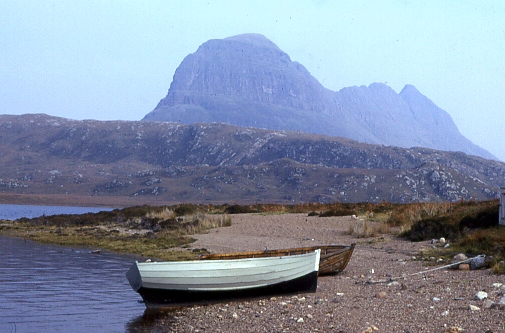
Fionn Loch and Suilven. The path by the River Kirkaig leads to the shore of the Fionn Loch, where boats wait for anglers. The distinctive bulk of Suilven dominates the view.

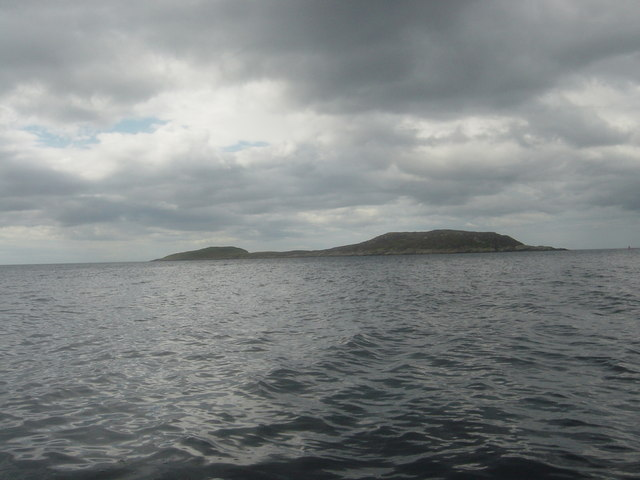
Soyea Island off Loch Inver is seen here in a view from a sea kayak passing Kirkaig Point.

== See also ==
- List of lochs in Scotland
- List of reservoirs and dams in the United Kingdom
