= Loch Leitir Easaidh =

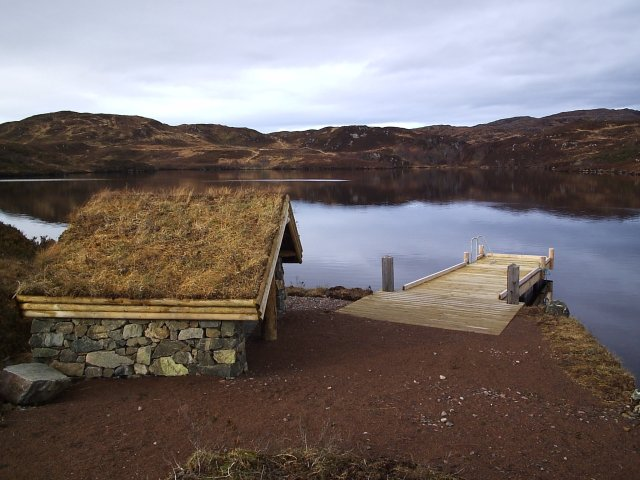
- Loch Leitir Easaidh at dusk

- Location within Sutherland
- Location: NC16802657
- Coordinates: 58.18980026°N 5.11801710°W
- Type: freshwater loch
- Primary inflows: unnamed burns flow from Loch na h-Innse Fraoich in the southeast and Loch Bad a' Chigean from the northeast.
- Primary outflows: unnamed burn flows from Loch Leitir Easaidh at the eastern end into Loch Assynt
- Max. length: 0.804672 km (0.500000 mi)
- Max. width: 0.643738 km (0.400000 mi)
- Surface area: 19 ha (47 acres)
- Average depth: 20.00 ft (6.10 m)
- Max. depth: 69.88 ft (21.30 m)
- Water volume: 423,213,862 ft^{3} (11,984,082.0 m^{3})
- Shore length^{1}: 3 km (1.9 mi)
- Surface elevation: 67 m (220 ft)
- Max. temperature: 53.5 °F (11.9 °C)
- Min. temperature: 42.0 °F (5.6 °C)
- ^{1} Shore length is not a well-defined measure.

Loch Leitir Easaidh is a small shallow irregular shaped freshwater lochan that flows directly into the northwestern end of Loch Assynt in Assynt, Sutherland, Scotland. The loch is located in an area along with neighbouring Coigach, as the Assynt-Coigach National Scenic Area, one of 40 such areas in Scotland.

== Geography ==
Loch Leitir Easaidh sits of the eastern end of a low-lying plateau, that is heavily populated with a number of other lochs to the east, that drain into Loch Inver basin. At the northern end of the plateau is a trending fault that travels in a northwest–southeast direction, traveling through Loch Assynt, Loch Leitir Easaidh along Gleannan Salach, through Loch na Loinne to Loch Poll and the coast.

To the north and northeast sit the three peaks of the Quinag,(Scottish Gaelic: A’ Chuineag) that sit in a Y-shaped crest. The three Corbett summits are Quinag - Sail Gorm at 776m, Quinag - Sail Gharbh at 808m and Quinag - Spidean Coinich at 764 m.

== Walking and fishing ==
The loch is popular with both fly-fisherman and walkers and has an all-access, all-abilities walk that has been developed by the Culag Community Woodland Trust. Two toilet blocks are provided at the loch.

The predominant species of fish found in the region were recently catalogued during a survey in November 2019. The predominant species of fish are trout and Salvelinus (char).
