= Inverkirkaig =

Coordinates: 58.126°N 5.25902°W

Inverkirkaig: Scottish Gaelic: Inbhir Chirceig
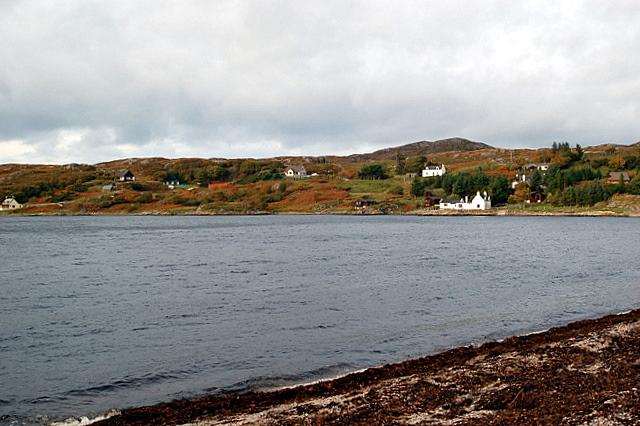
- Inverkirkaig

- Location within the Sutherland area
- OS grid reference: NC081198
- Council area: Highland
- Lieutenancy area: Sutherland
- Country: Scotland
- Sovereign state: United Kingdom
- Post town: Lairg
- Postcode district: IV27 4
- Police: Scotland
- Fire: Scottish
- Ambulance: Scottish

Inverkirkaig (Scottish Gaelic: Inbhir Chirceig) is extremely remote scattered crofting township, situated on the north eastern bay, of the sea loch Loch Kirkaig, in the Assynt district of Sutherland, Scottish Highlands and is in the Scottish council area of Highland.

The hamlets of Badnaban, Strathan and Lochinver are situated directly north of the township.
