= Loch Assynt =

Lake in Sutherland, Scotland

- Loch Asainn
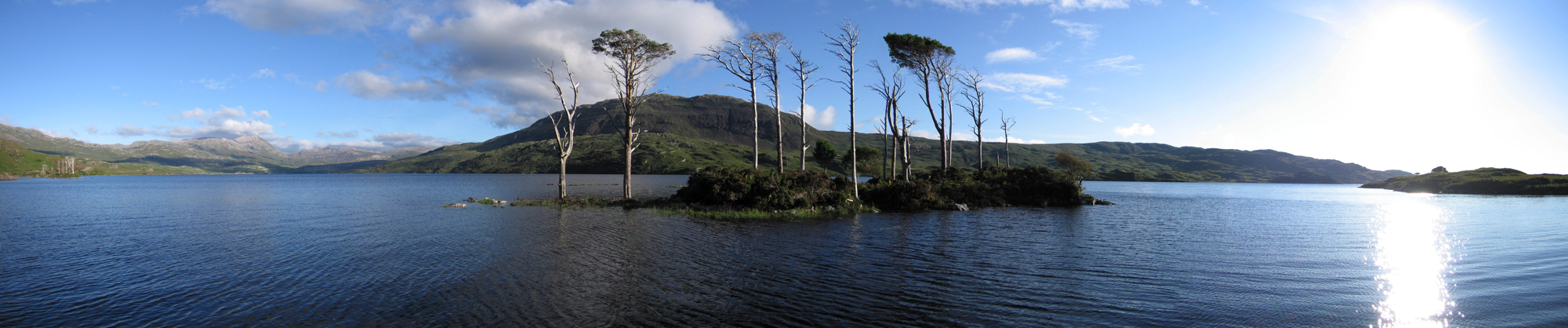

- Location within Sutherland
- Location: Sutherland, Scotland
- Coordinates: 58°10′30″N 5°02′30″W
- Type: loch
- Primary outflows: Inver river
- Catchment area: 69 km^{2} (27 sq mi)
- Basin countries: United Kingdom
- Max. length: 10 km (6.2 mi)
- Max. width: 1 km (0.62 mi)
- Surface area: 800 ha (2,000 acres)
- Max. depth: 86 m (282 ft)
- Water volume: 247.2 hm^{3} (200,400 acre⋅ft)
- Surface elevation: 66 m (217 ft)

Loch Assynt (Scottish Gaelic: Loch Asainn or Loch Asainte) is a freshwater loch in Sutherland, Scotland, 8 kilometres (5.0 mi) north-east of Lochinver.

Situated in a spectacular setting between the heights of Canisp, Quinag and Beinn Uidhe, it receives the outflow from Loch Awe, Loch Maol a' Choire, and Loch Leitir Easaidh. It discharges into the sea at Loch Inver, via the River Inver. The general trend of the loch is west-northwest and east-southeast, while the western end bends sharply at Lochassynt lodge to the southwest.

The loch is 9.65 kilometres (6 mi) long, and about 1.5 kilometres (1 mi) in maximum breadth. The total area is approximately 800 hectares (1,980 acres) and its drainage basin is over 111 square kilometres (43 sq mi). The total volume of the loch is approximately 250 million cubic metres (9 billion cubic feet) and the maximum depth is 86 metres (282 feet).

There is excellent fishing for trout, sea-trout, and salmon. Ardvreck Castle, once held by the MacLeods and Mackenzies, occupies a promontory on the north shore, west of Inchnadamph.

The elevation of the loch's surface above sea level varies with the levels of rainfall but has been measured as 65.55 metres (215.1 ft).

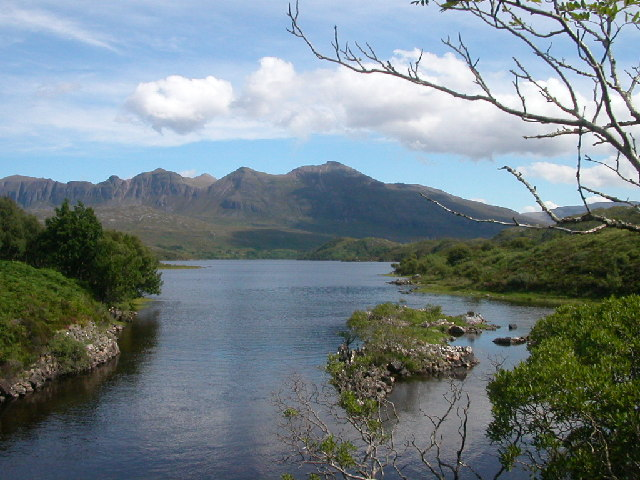
The western end of Loch Assynt with Quinag in the distance

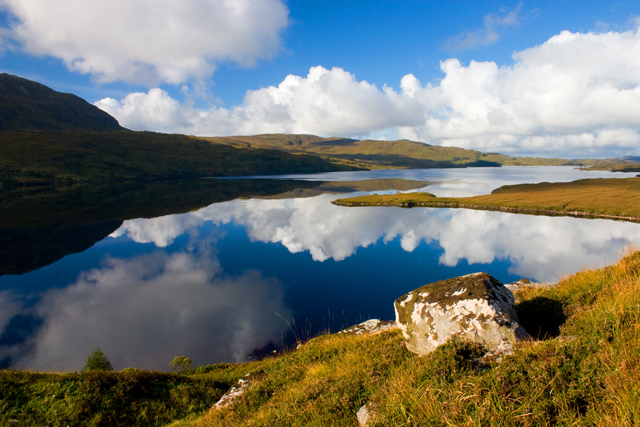
Loch Assynt from Cnoc an Lochain Fheòir

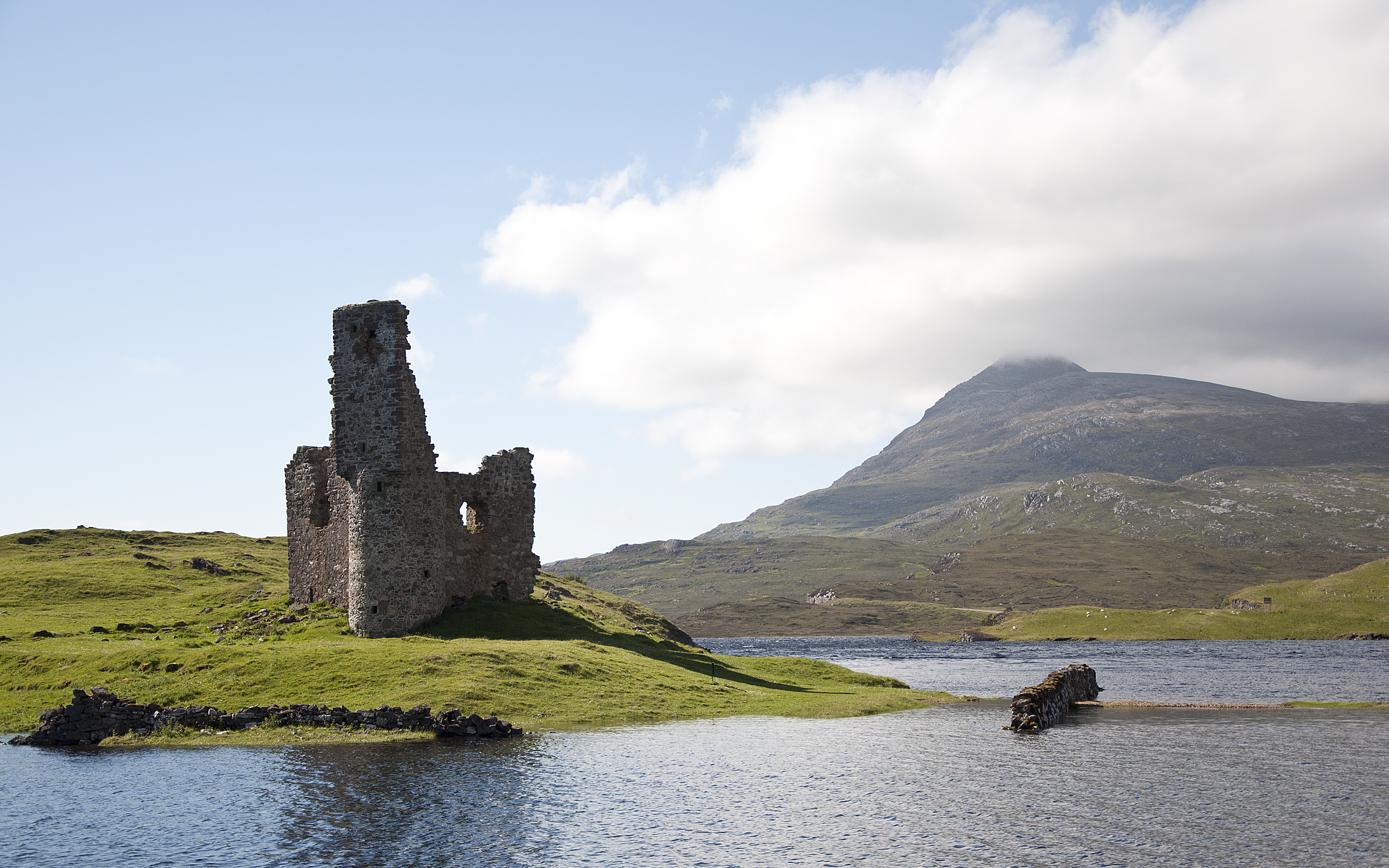
Ardvreck Castle

== The Mermaid of Assynt ==
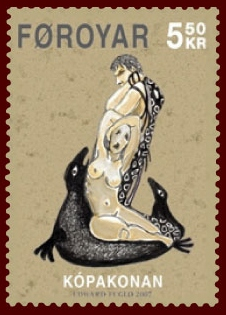
A Faroese stamp depicting the capture of a seal woman

Whispered amongst the locals of Inchnadamph, the area surrounding the castle, legend tells of MacLeod's lost daughter, Eimhir, and her continued presence at Loch Assynt. Instead of jumping to her death, they believe Eimhir plunged into the caverns of the loch and, hiding from the devil to whom she was promised, made a new home beneath the water's surface, becoming the elusive 'mermaid of Assynt'.

The locals also use this legend to account for natural changes in the landscape. When the loch's water rise above their normal levels, legend tells that these are Eimhir's tears mourning her life lost on the land. Some even claim to have sighted her weeping on the rocks, her body now transformed into half woman, half sea creature. Some contest her form, instead calling her Selkie, the Nordic mythological figure of the sea, who must first shed tears into the water in order to become visible again to the human eye.

The legend also accounts for the geology of Inchnadamph. Clootie, infuriated by the broken promise of marriage summoned meteoric rocks from Chaos to obliterate Inchnadamph and MacLeod's kingdom. It is thought that this legend bears some relationship with the scientific findings that indicate north west Scotland was struck by an object from space around 1.2 billion years ago. Geologists from Aberdeen university described the event; "[a] massive impact would have melted rocks and thrown up an enormous cloud of vapour that scattered material over a large part of the region around Ullapool. The crater was rapidly buried by sandstone which helped to preserve the evidence."

These legends are invoked to offer some mythical explanation for the unique geological and topographical character of Inchnadamph. Another version of the tale of the mermaid of Assynt relates to the creation of the Moine Thrust belt. Some believe Clootie's rage produced a tectonic rumbling from the earths core, resulting in the thrust westwards of the European plate, which is understood by geologists to account for the Moine Thrust belt.
