= Loch Vatachan =

Loch in Scotland

- Loch Bhatachan
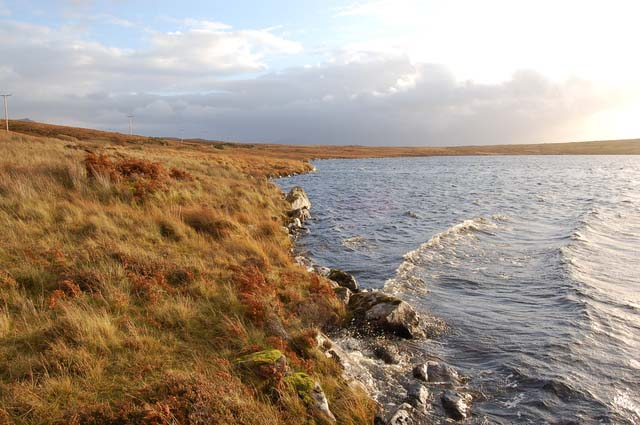
- Loch Vatachan from its east shore

- Location within Sutherland
- Location: Scottish Highlands
- Coordinates: 58°02′37.8″N 5°21′32.1″W
- Primary inflows: Allt Braigh an t-Sratha, Allt an Fhealing, Fèith Ruadh
- Primary outflows: Loch Raa
- Basin countries: Scotland, United Kingdom
- Max. length: 1.4 km (0.9 mi)
- Max. width: 510 m (1,670 ft)
- Surface elevation: 11 m (36 ft)

Loch Vatachan or more correctly in Gaelic Loch Bhatachan is a freshwater loch in Wester Ross, Scotland, just over a kilometre north of Achiltibuie.

The name is an Anglicisation of the Scottish Gaelic bhàthaichean, meaning "of the byre" i.e. "Loch of the Byre". The loch's name appeared as "Bhattachan" on OS Maps until the 1900s. Several ruined shielings and hut circles of uncertain age have been found on the braes above its shores.

Loch Vatachan feeds into Loch Raa (Loch Rà) via a short burn, which in turn flows into Achnahaird Bay.
