= Soyea Island =

Uninhabited island near Assynt, Sutherland, Scotland

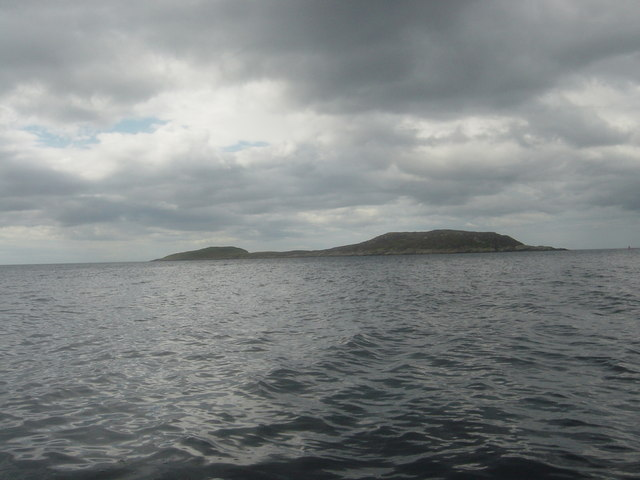

Location
- Soyea Island shown within Highland
- OS grid reference: NC0465521990
- Coordinates: 58.143442°N 5.3206176°W

Name
- Name meaning: Sheep island

Physical geography
- Area: 20 hectares (0.08 sq mi)
- Highest elevation: 38m

Administration
- Council area: Highland
- Country: Scotland
- Sovereign state: United Kingdom

Demographics
- Population: 0

Soyea Island or Soyea is an uninhabited rocky island at the mouth of Loch Inver, in Assynt, Sutherland, in the council area of Highland, Scotland. It is three nautical miles (six kilometres) west of Lochinver and two nautical miles (four kilometres) south-southwest of Achmelvich. The Broad Rocks extend up to 400 yards (370 metres) from the eastern edge of Soyea Island. Measuring approximately 1/2 mile (800 metres) from east to west, its area is 20 hectares (50 acres) and it rises to an elevation of 38 metres (125 ft). Soyea marks the entrance of the fishing harbour of Lochinver. Soyea Island has a yellow pedestal light on it.

== History ==
The name "Soyea" is Old Norse and means "Sheep-isle" or "Sea island". In 1881 it was recorded as a pastoral islet. In the 1920s, Soyea had a colony of Abraxas grossulariata (magpie moths) which were rare on the mainland.
