= Loch Awe, Inchnadamph =

Loch Awe
- Loch Obha
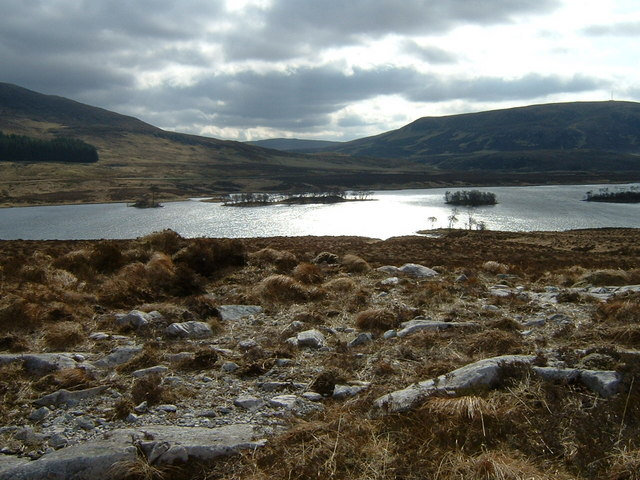
- Loch Awe Trees have flourished on the islands, safe from grazing deer.

- Location within Sutherland
- Location: NC24561530
- Coordinates: 58.09130096°N 4.97789574°W
- Type: freshwater loch
- Primary inflows: Unnamed burn that flows from Loch na Gruagaich into the northern end of Loch Awe.
- Primary outflows: River Loanan, drains into Loch Assynt
- Max. length: 1.28 km (0.80 mi)
- Max. width: 0.48 km (0.30 mi)
- Surface area: 31 ha (77 acres)
- Average depth: 4.92126 ft (1.50000 m)
- Max. depth: 6.88976 ft (2.10000 m)
- Water volume: 16,573,596.9 ft^{3} (469,312.00 m^{3})
- Shore length^{1}: 4 km (2.5 mi)
- Surface elevation: 154 m (505 ft)
- Max. temperature: 53.5 °F (11.9 °C)
- Min. temperature: 3.5 °F (−15.8 °C)
- Islands: 8
- ^{1} Shore length is not a well-defined measure.

Loch Awe (Scottish Gaelic: Loch Obha) is a small loch, located 4 miles south of Loch Assynt and next to the village of Ledmore, within the Assynt area of Sutherland, Scotland. The loch is located in an area along with neighbouring Coigach, as the Assynt-Coigach National Scenic Area, one of 40 such areas in Scotland.

== Cairn ==
Immediately south and west of the loch is a circular cairn at Cnoc Bad Na Cleithe. The first cairn measures 6 to 7 foot high and measures 63 feet on a north–south bearing at the base, by 70 feet. They were surveyed on 11 June 1909 and there is no sign of a cist or chamber.

== Geography ==
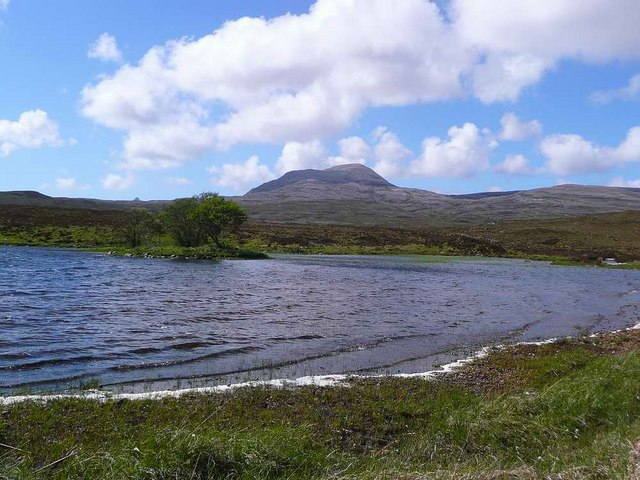
Loch Awe and Canisp in the distance

Loch Awe in Sutherland is one of a number of lochs in that area that drain into the Loch Inver and Inver Basin. To the northwest of Loch Awe are smaller lochans that drain into Loch Awe. These are Loch na Gruagaich and further northeast is Loch na Saighe Duibhe as well as a small group of lochans that are unnamed.

Overlooking the loch to the north is the imposing bulk of Canisp (Scottish Gaelic: Canasp) at 847 metres (2779 feet).
