= Clashmore, Assynt =

Settlement in Assynt, Highland, Scotland

Coordinates: 58°13′27″N 5°20′54″W

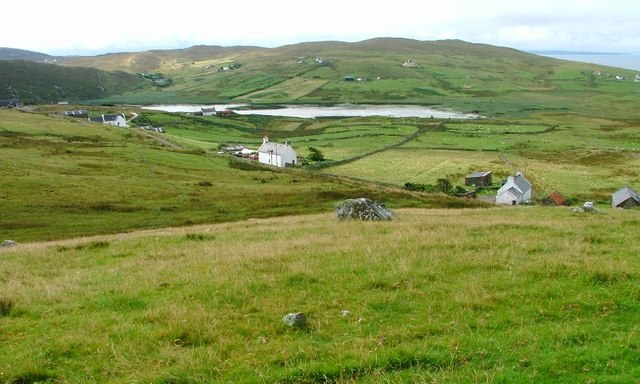
Clashmore

Clashmore (Scottish Gaelic: A' Chlais Mhòr or An Clais Mòr, meaning "the large furrow") is a scattered township in Assynt, in Sutherland, in the Highland council area of Scotland. It is situated on the Rubha Stoer, 10 km north west of Lochinver, overlooking Loch na Claise.
