= Achmelvich =

Coordinates: 58.17°N 5.30°W

Achmelvich: Scottish Gaelic: Achadh Mhealbhaich
- Location within the Sutherland area
- Council area: Highland
- Lieutenancy area: Sutherland
- Country: Scotland
- Sovereign state: United Kingdom
- Post town: LAIRG
- Postcode district: IV27
- Dialling code: 01571 844
- Police: Scotland
- Fire: Scottish
- Ambulance: Scottish
- UK Parliament: Caithness, Sutherland and Easter Ross
- Scottish Parliament: Caithness, Sutherland and Ross constituency in the Highlands and Islands electoral region

Achmelvich (Gaelic: Achadh Mhealbhaich) is a settlement situated in the Highland region of Scotland. The name comes from the Gaelic "Achadh" - a plain or meadow and "mealbhaich" - sandy dunes.

== Location ==
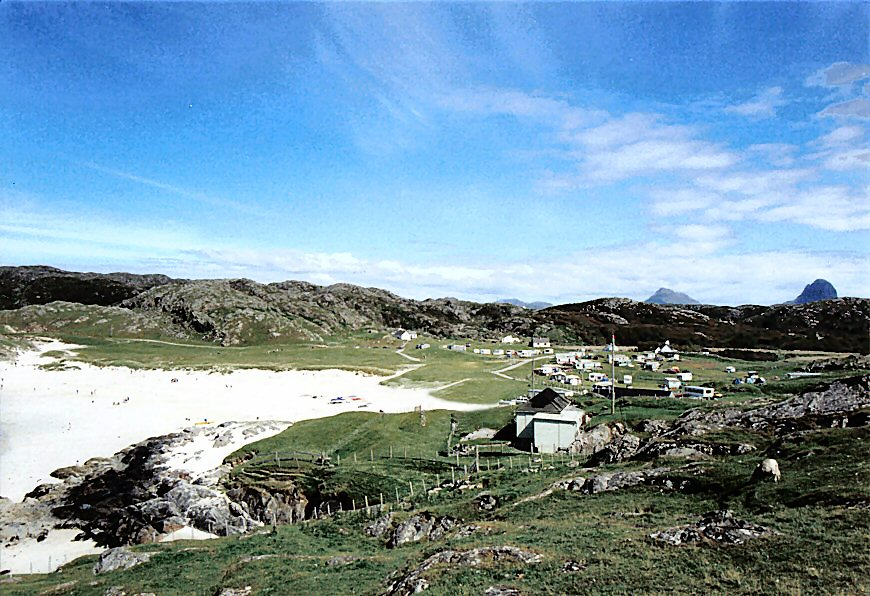
Looking across Achmelvich beach towards Canisp and Suilven, showing the Machair as well as the Youth Hostel and Caravan Sites

Achmelvich lies three miles (five kilometres) northwest of Lochinver, and 40 miles (65 kilometres) north of Ullapool, in the northwest of the Scotland, accessed by single-track road which leads from the B869 coastal tourist route. Despite the difficult road, the area is popular with tourists.

== Settlement and facilities ==
As a settlement, Achmelvich is spread over the surrounding hillsides, with the focal point being the beach which has consistently been awarded "MCS recommended" status and also given the blue flag award. There are two camping and caravan parks open for business, both have residential caravans to let, although only one has pitches for tents, camper vans and caravans. There is also a small laundrette, shop and a takeaway. These sites overlook the beach, with views out into the Minch as well as Port Altan Na Bradhan.

The main beach car park is separated from the beach by the machair and has recently been upgraded. The Youth Hostel, Tourist Information Hut and public toilets are all located by the main beach car park.

== Tourist attractions ==
Water-skiing, windsurfing and coasteering are popular pursuits on the beach. The production of a beach management guide in 2004 led to dogs being banned from the beach during the peak tourist season and neither of the camping and caravan sites allow dogs.

The unique morphology of the area means there are many nearby walks and climbs, including Suilven, for those interested in hiking. The Inchnadamph National Nature Reserve, which is well within driving distance, has many caves and pot holes as well as being the access route to Conival and Ben More Assynt, the area's two Munros.

There are also fishing opportunities to be had both in the sea, with cod, haddock, whiting, pollack, saithe and mackerel being common catches, or in the local lochs (subject to permit) which are stocked with trout, salmon and Arctic char.

Assynt is renowned for having diverse wildlife and Achmelvich is no exceptions with cetaceans, seals, basking sharks, otters, pine martens, ospreys and white-tailed eagles having been seen in the area.

== "Hermit's Castle" ==
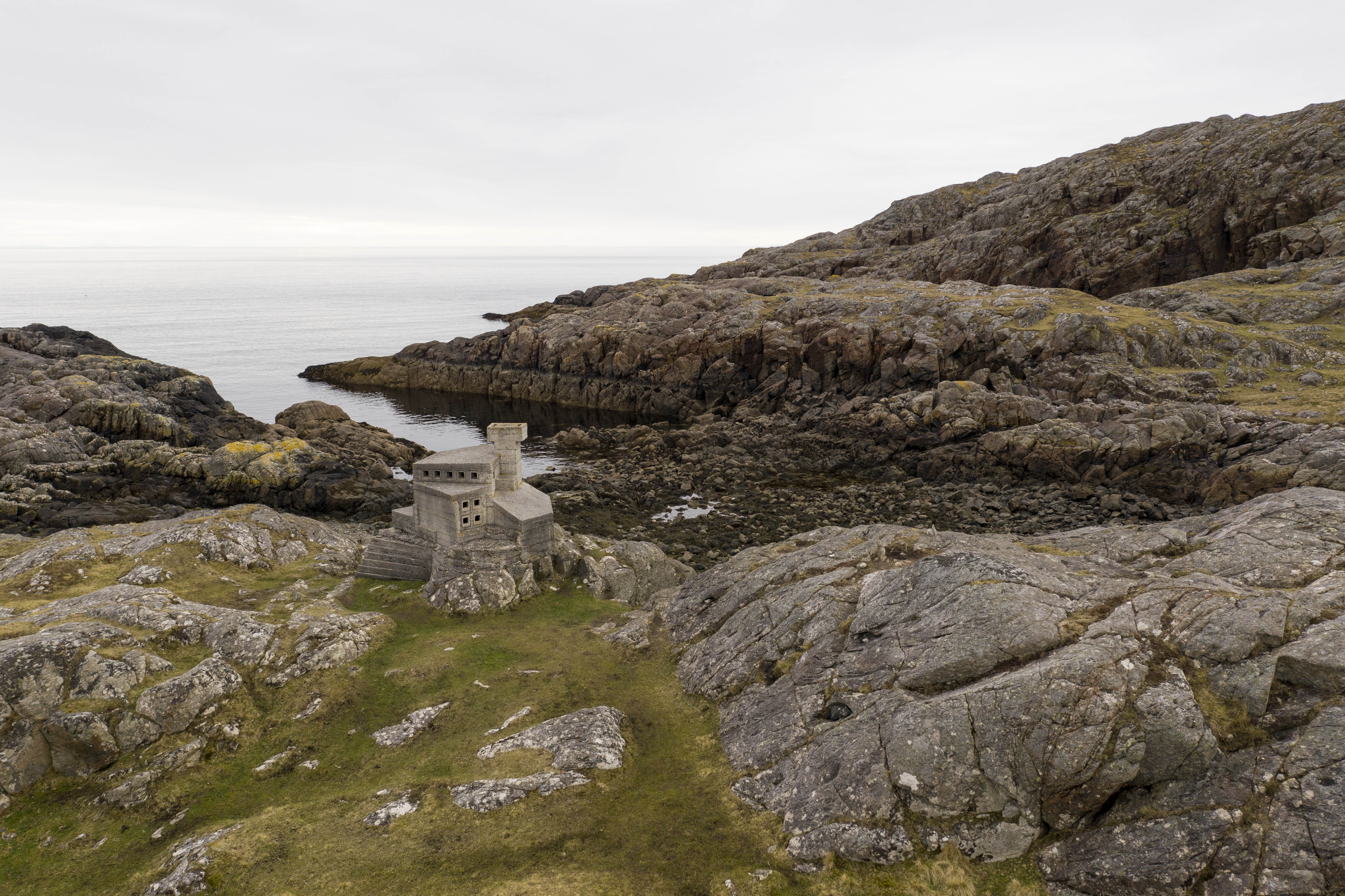
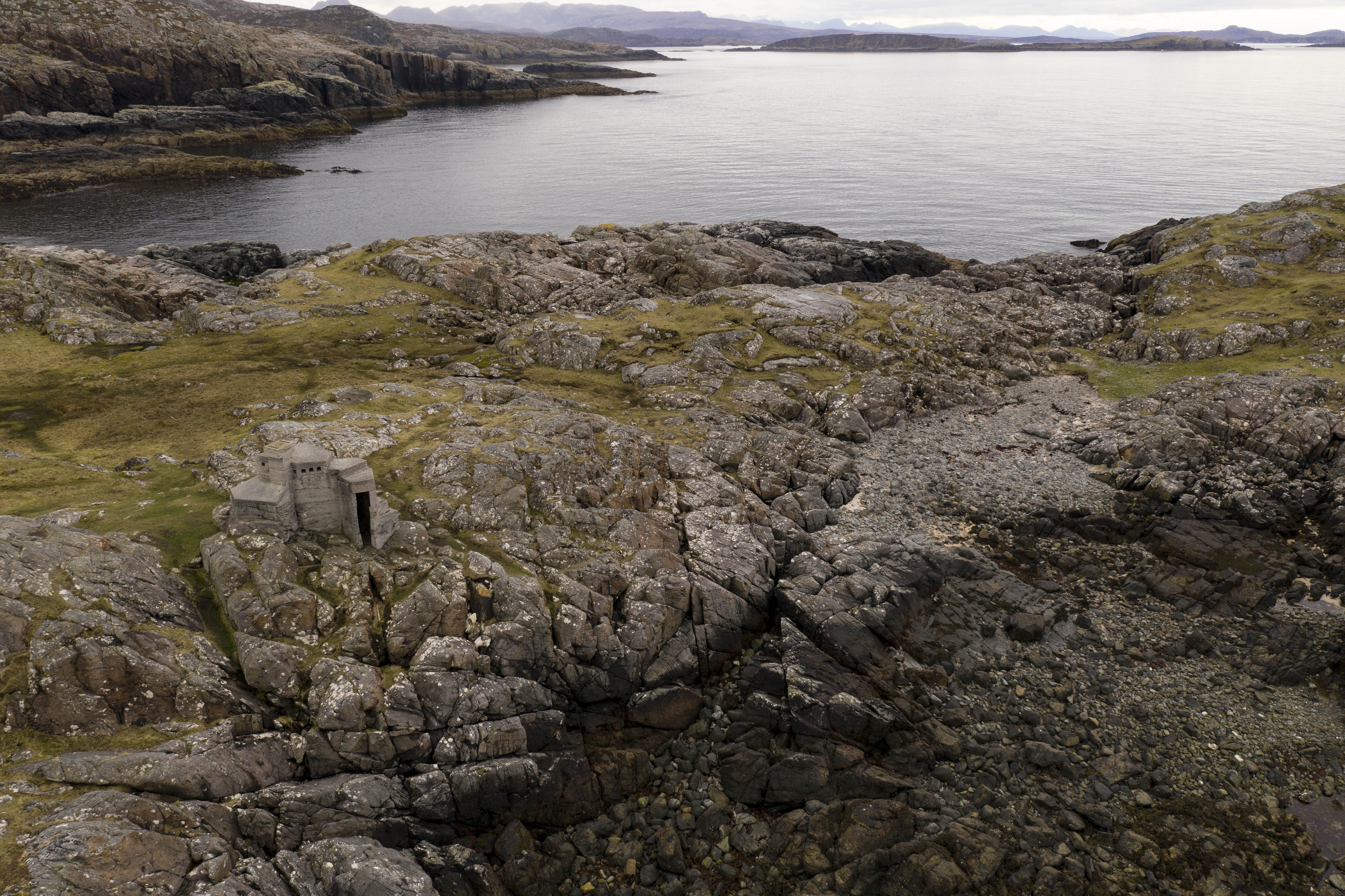
Hermit's Castle, landward and seaward sides

Achmelvich is home to what is reputedly Europe's smallest castle, known locally as Hermit's Castle. The castle was built in the 1950s by an English architect (David Scott), who left the area shortly after completion, spending only a weekend in the castle he spent months building. The castle was vandalised in the 1970s, when the windows were smashed and the door removed, but it is not unknown for people to use the castle as a bothy.

The detail design of this structure may give a clue to its popular name, as the entrance aperture consists of a tall but very narrow slit barely a foot wide. In this regard the design may be said to approach the concept of an anchorite's (or hermit's) cell, a ceremonially bricked up enclosure whose sole access was only large enough to allow for the passage of food in and waste out.

Another feature of great interest is that the structure is perched quite high above, and close to the edge of, a small inlet of the sea, and the above-mentioned aperture is on the seaward side. This results in the need to enter the Castle from below. Such a location also suggests a defensive aspect to the design. Combined with the quite strong resemblance to a pill-box or similar military structure, this leads one to speculate exactly what the Castle's architect designer had in his mind when building it.

== Fishing ==
Statistics gathered by the Fishery Board before the First World War give an insight into fishing from Achmelvich at that time.

Fishery Statistics

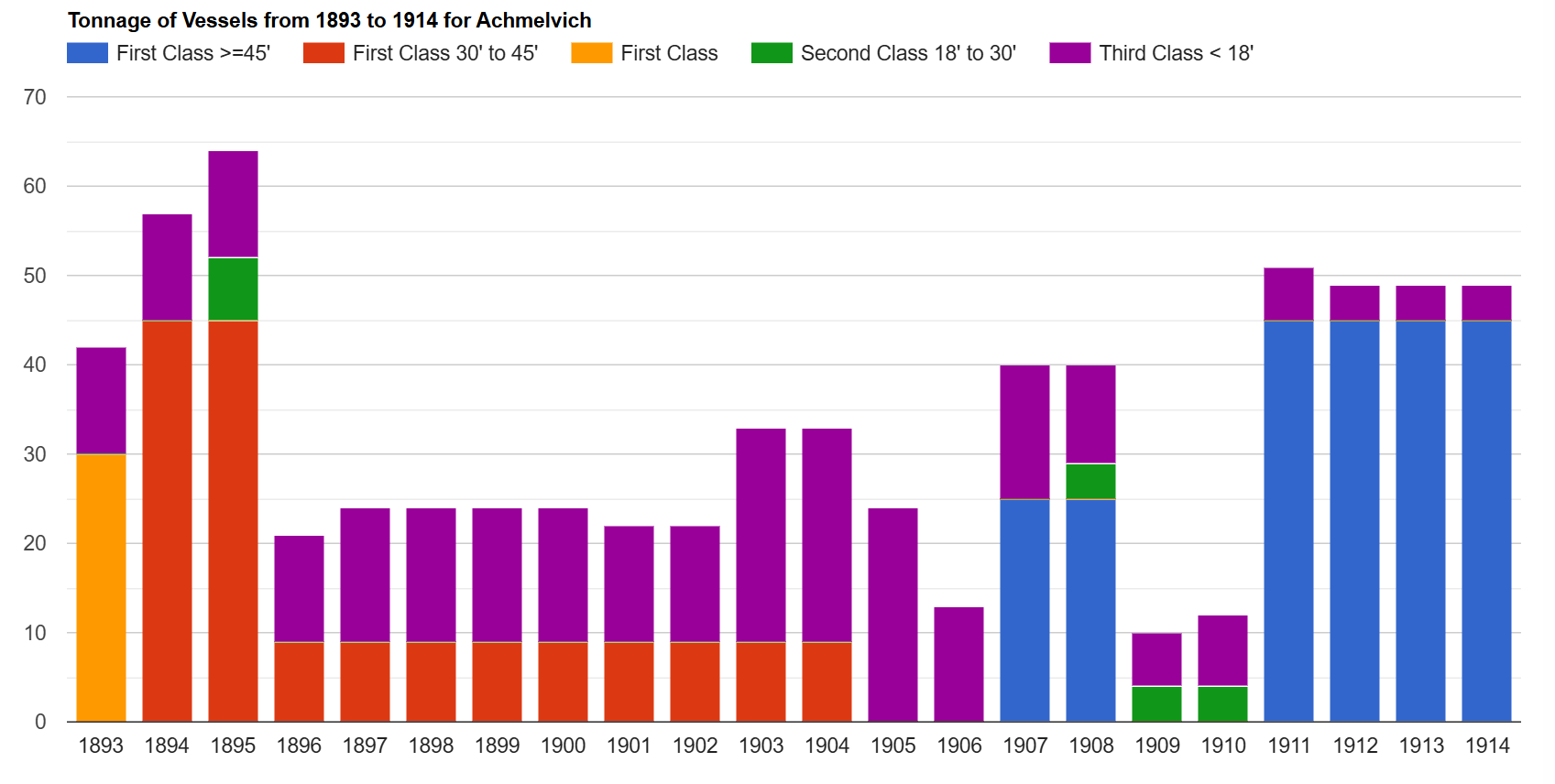
Tonnage of vessels

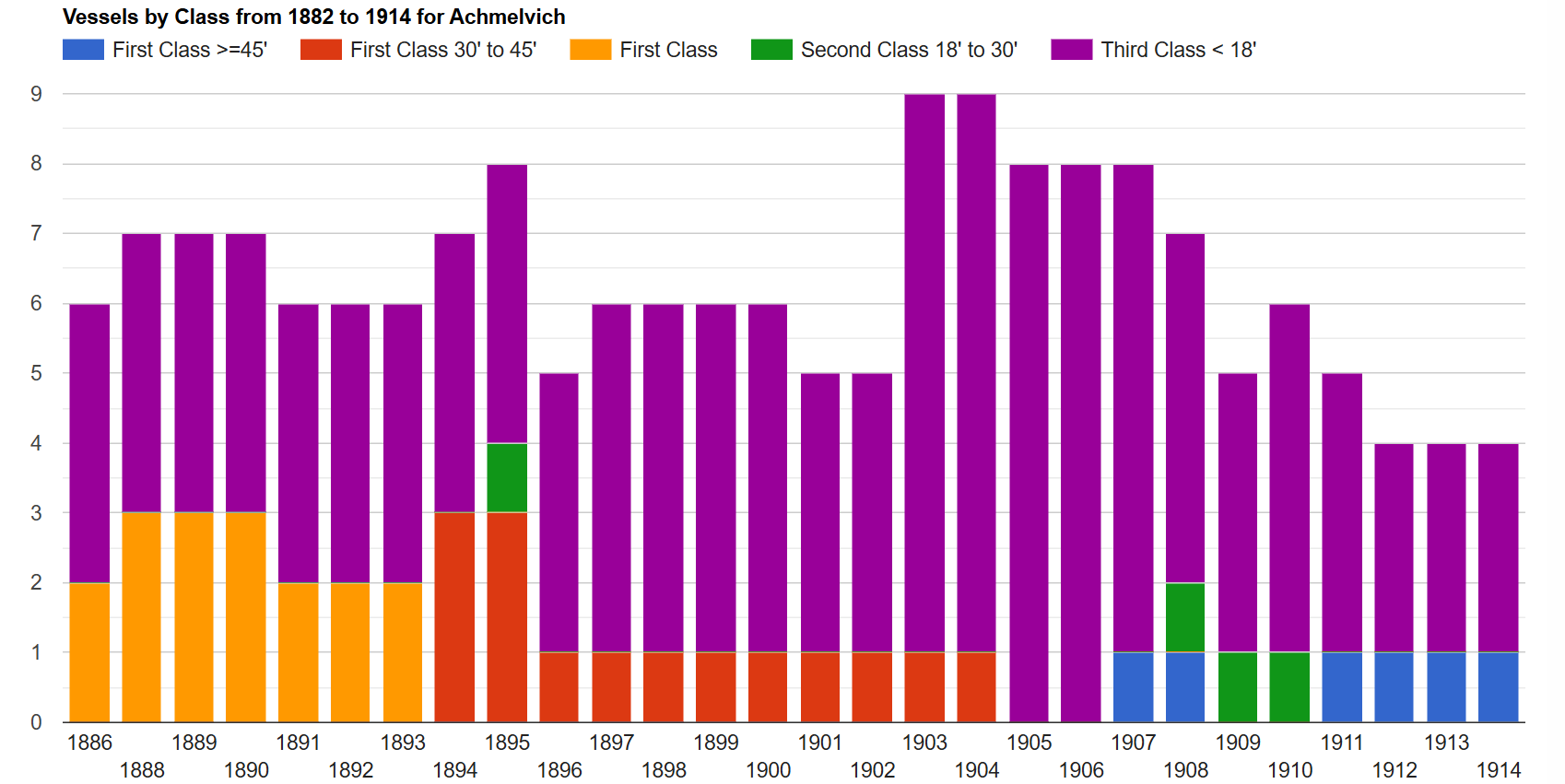
Vessels by class

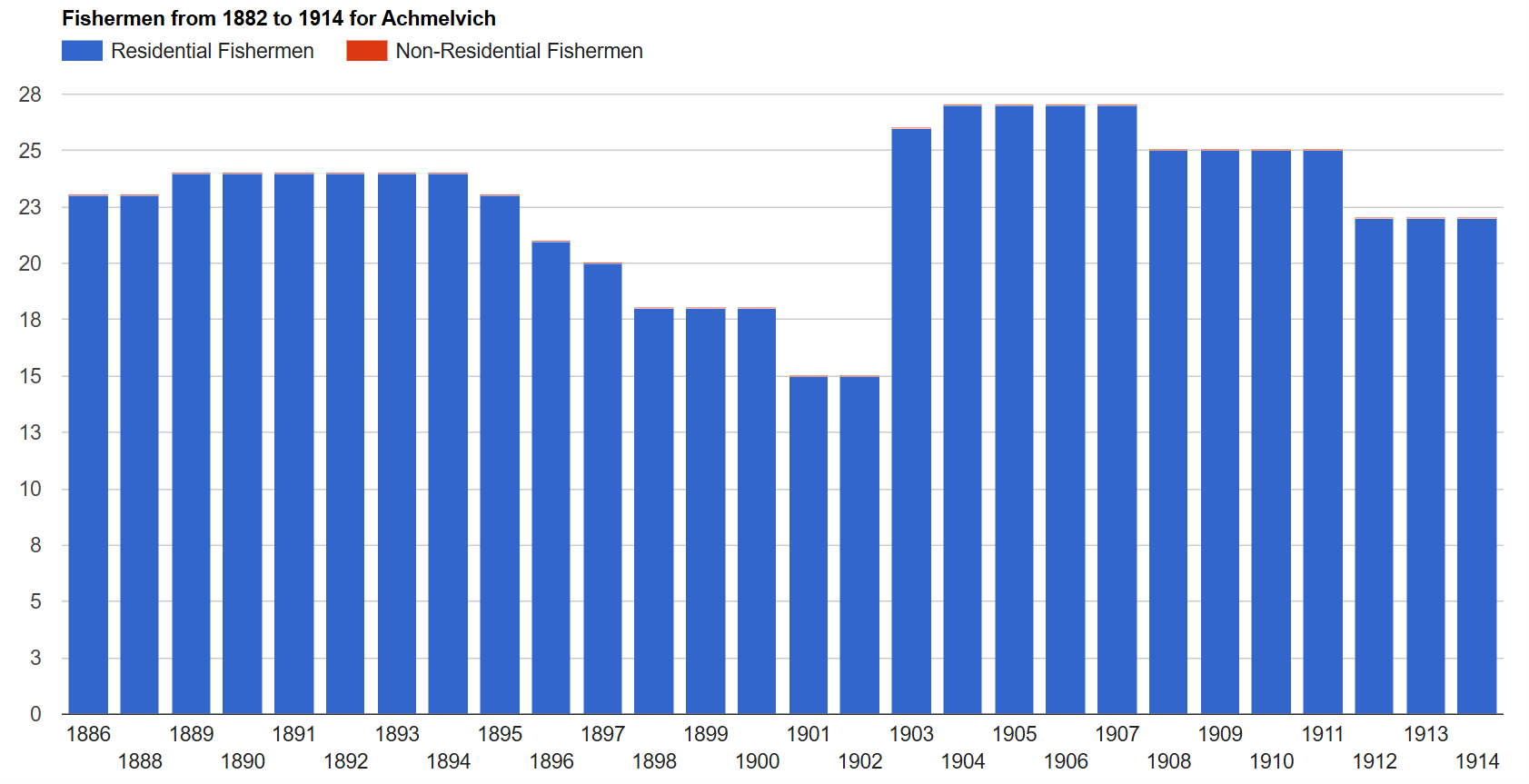
Fishermen

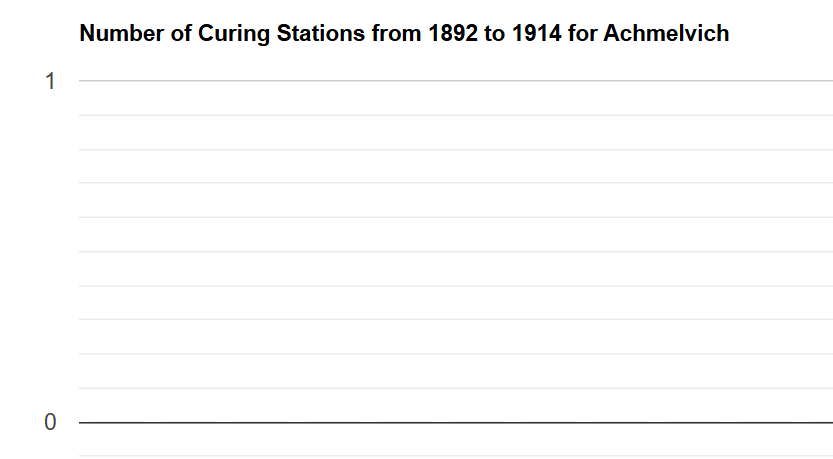
Placeholder - no curing stations

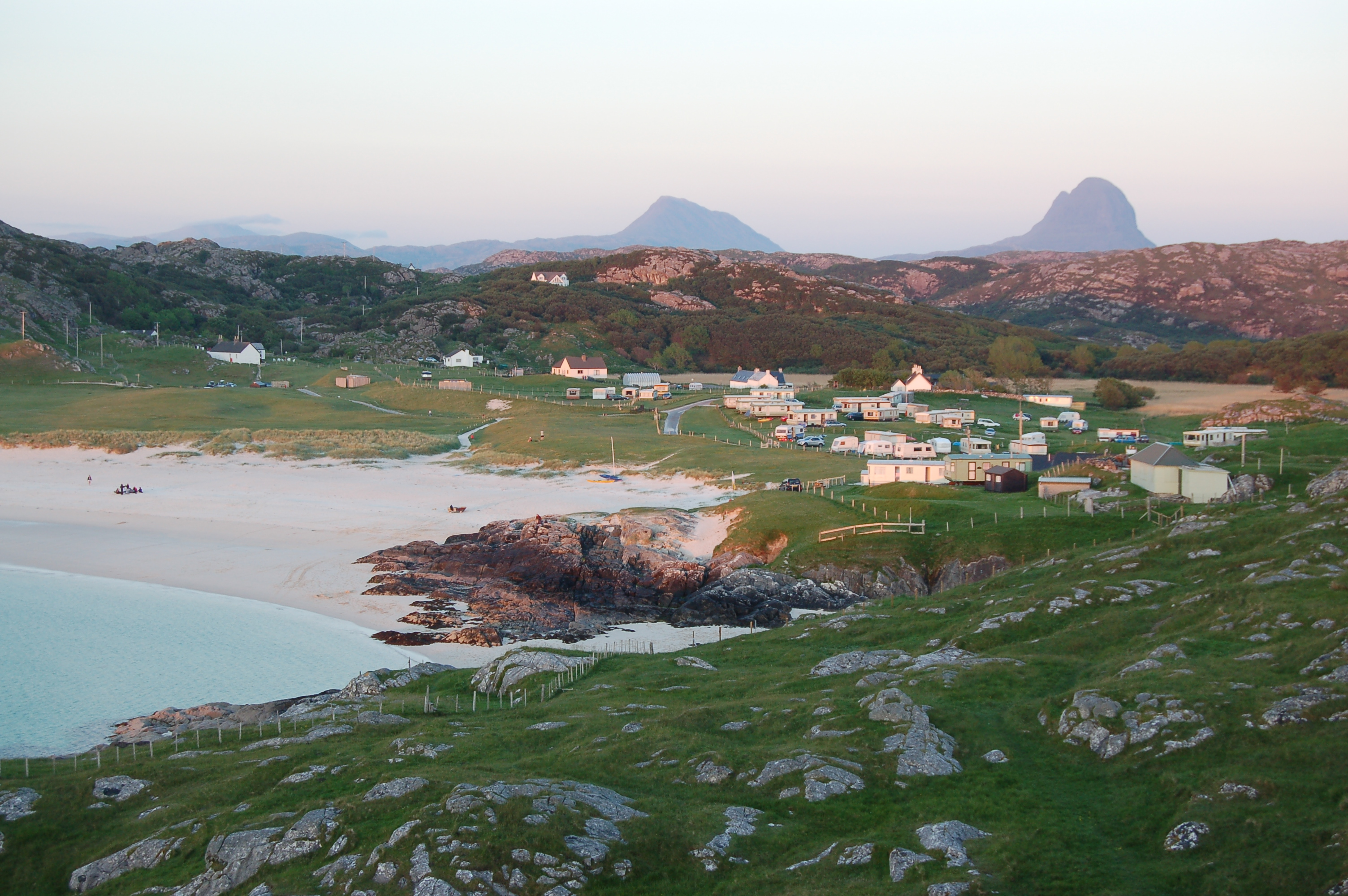

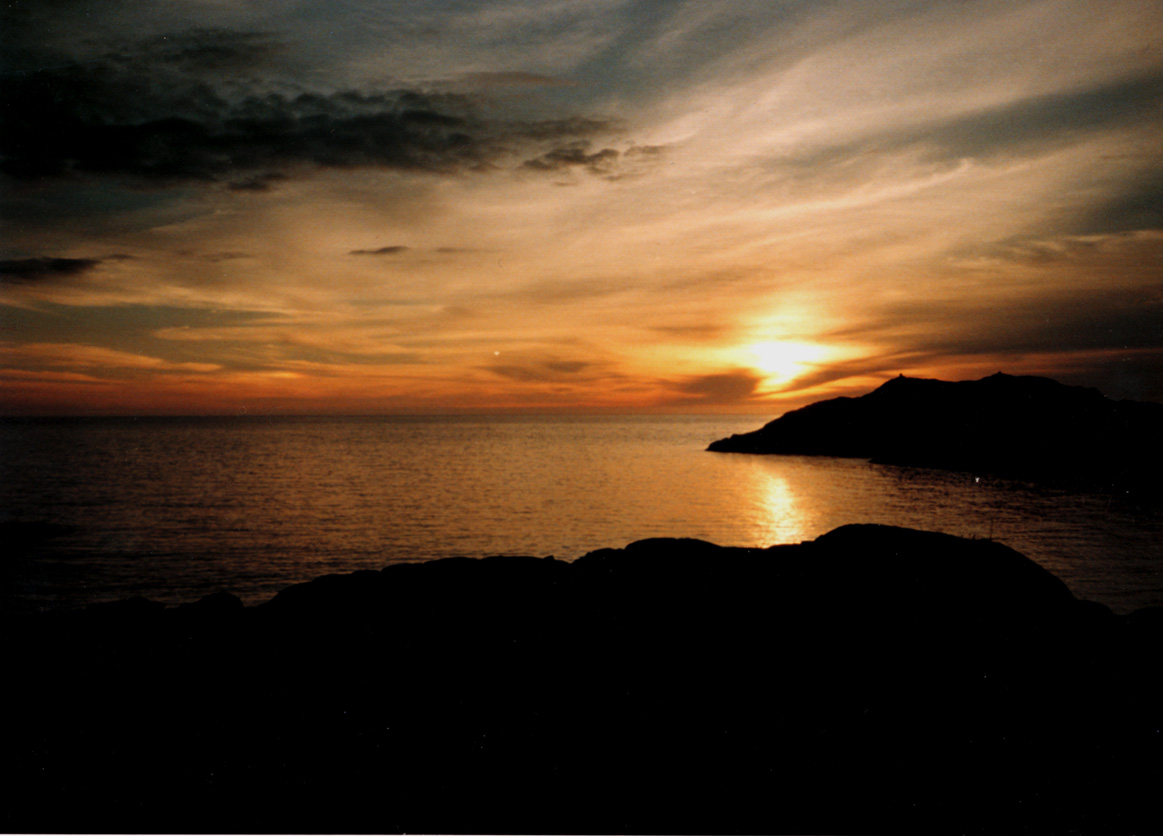

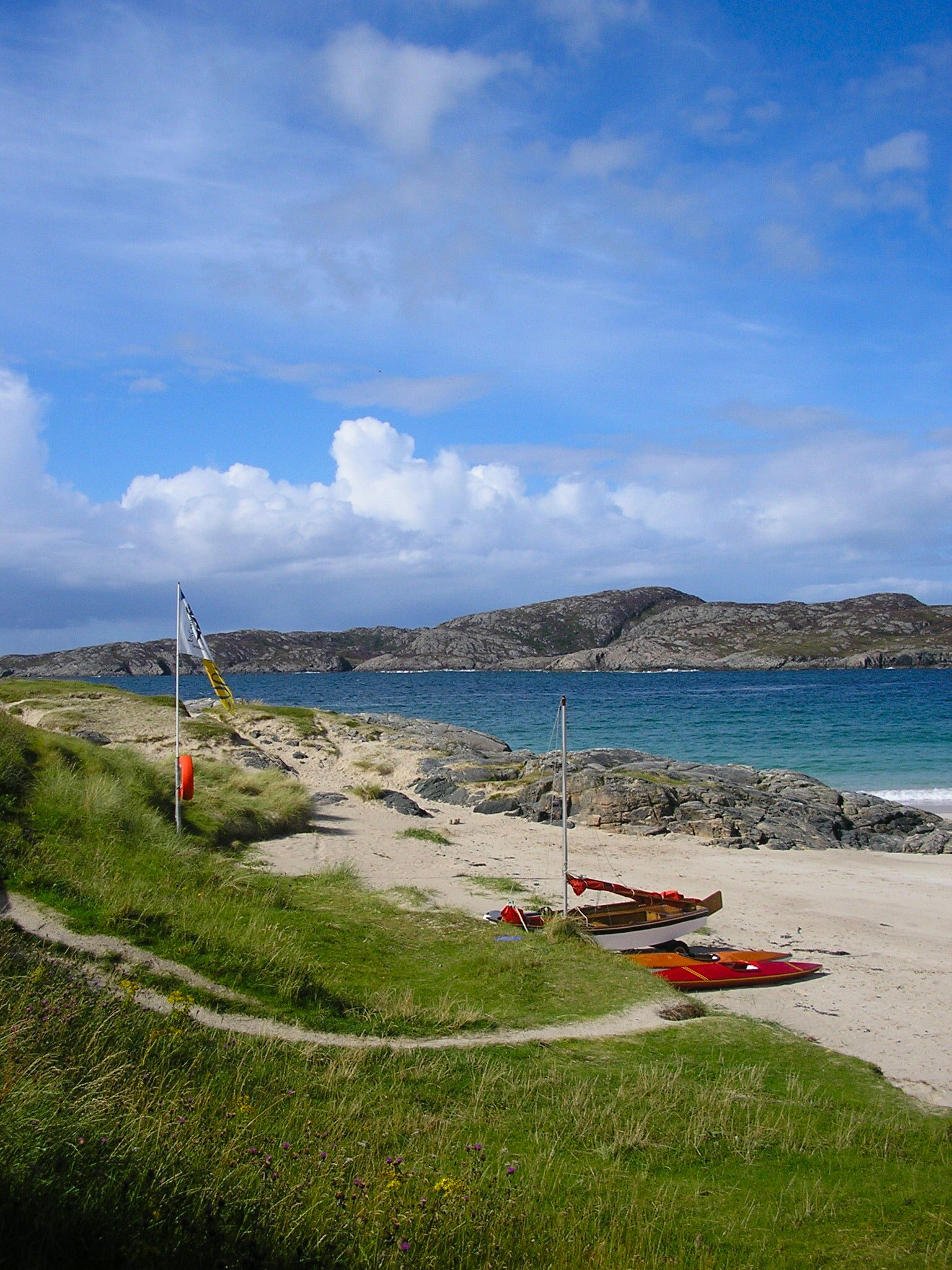
