= Culkein Drumbeg =

Coordinates: 58.251°N 5.217°W

Culkein Drumbeg: Scottish Gaelic: Cùl-Chinn Dhrombaig
- Location within the Sutherland area
- Population: 20 (estimate)
- Council area: Highland
- Lieutenancy area: Sutherland
- Country: Scotland
- Sovereign state: United Kingdom
- Post town: Lairg
- Postcode district: IV27 4NL
- Dialling code: (01571) 833
- Police: Scotland
- Fire: Scottish
- Ambulance: Scottish
- UK Parliament: Caithness, Sutherland and Easter Ross
- Scottish Parliament: Caithness, Sutherland and Ross

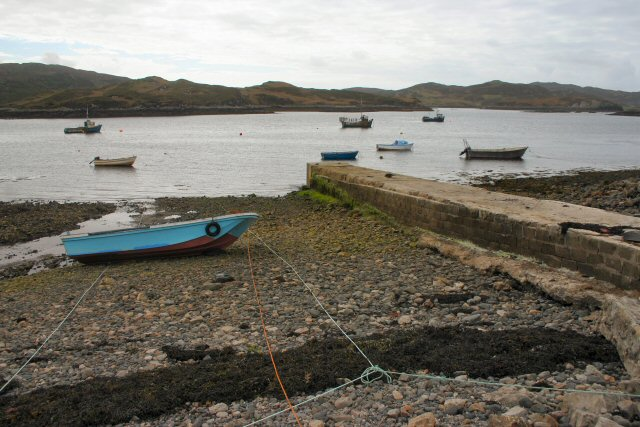
Culkein Drumbeg jetty

Culkein Drumbeg (Scottish Gaelic: Cùl-Chinn Dhrombaig) is a remote village on the north west coast of Scotland. It is located 0.93 miles (1.50 km) north west of Drumbeg in Assynt, Sutherland, in the Highland council area.

It is a crofting and fishing village, and has a small jetty used by several fishing boats, pleasure boats, and fish farm boats.

Scenes of the short film, Zip 'n Zoo were filmed in Culkein Drumbeg. Many residents appeared as extras.

Its name is to contrast it to Culkein Achnacarnin (Scottish Gaelic: Cùl-Chinn Achadh nan Càrnan), also in Assynt.
