= Achnahaird Bay =

Inlet of Enard Bay in Wester Ross, Scotland

Coordinates: 58.072°N 5.361°W

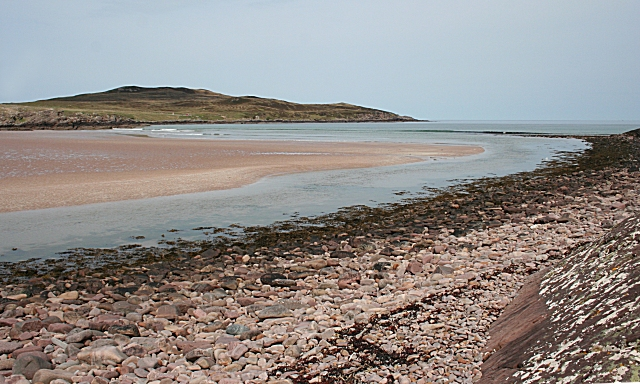
Achnahaird Bay, Wester Ross, looking across the bay where Allt Loch Raa enters the sea. The low hill on the other side of the bay is the imaginatively named Cnoc Mòr ('big lump')

Achnahaird Bay is an inlet of Enard Bay, located on the Coigach peninsula, in Wester Ross, Scotland. It can be accessed by following the road leading to the scattered settlement of Achiltibuie. The wide sandy beach has views of the mountains Stac Pollaidh, Canisp and Suilven. Achnahaird Bay was used as a filming location for the 2011 film The Eagle, where a horse chase scene was shot across the beach.

There is a caravan site near the beach.
