= Badnaban =

Coordinates: 58.13941°N 5.2615°W

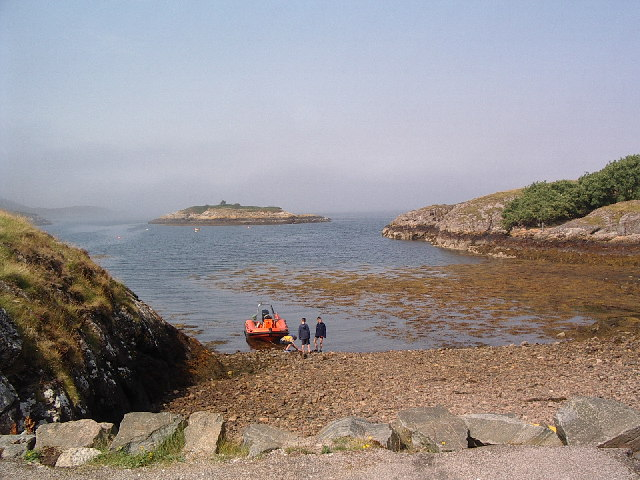
- View of the beach and island at Badnaban looking out over Loch Inver in the mist

- Location within the Sutherland area
- OS grid reference: NC081213
- Council area: Highland
- Lieutenancy area: Sutherland
- Country: Scotland
- Sovereign state: United Kingdom
- Post town: Lairg
- Postcode district: IV27 4
- Police: Scotland
- Fire: Scottish
- Ambulance: Scottish

Badnaban is a remote scattered coastal village, which lies on the south shore of the sea loch, Loch Inver, in the Assynt district of the west coast of Sutherland, Scottish Highlands. and is in the Scottish council area of Highland.

Badnaban is situated less than 1 mile southwest of Strathan and 2 miles southwest of Lochinver.
