= Quinag =

Mountain in the United Kingdom

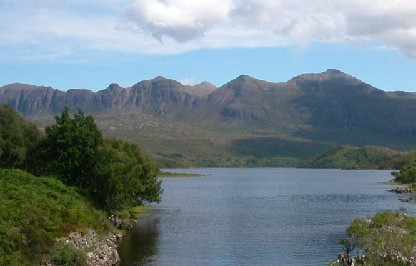
- Quinag in the distance from the western end of Loch Assynt

Highest point
- Elevation: Sàil Gharbh: 808 m (2,651 ft); Sàil Ghorm: 776 m (2,546 ft); Spidean Coinich: 764 m (2,507 ft)
- Prominence: c. 553 m, 158 m, 192 m
- Listing: Corbett, Marilyn (both x3)

Naming
- Native name: Scottish Gaelic: A’ Chuinneag
- English translation: Little milk pail
- Pronunciation: Scottish Gaelic: [ə ˈxɯɲak] English: /ˈkʊnjæɡ/ KUUN-yag

Geography
- Location: Assynt, Scotland
- Range coordinates: 58.21506°N 5.05053°W
- OS grid: NC209292
- Topo map: OS Landranger 15

Quinag (Scottish Gaelic: A’ Chuinneag) is an 808 m high mountain range in Sutherland in the Scottish Highlands, with an undulating series of peaks along its Y-shaped crest. The name Quinag is an anglicisation of the Gaelic name Cuinneag, a milk pail, reflecting its distinctive shape.

Geologically, Quinag is made of Torridonian sandstone, resting on a substrate of Lewisian gneiss. The highest peaks are capped by a thin skin of Cambrian quartzites with the gentle eastern slope of Spidean Còinich being a dip slope formed along the quartzite beds. The massif is an excellent place to appreciate the relationship between these three major rock units of the NW Highland.

== Ascent ==
Quinag boasts three separate Corbett summits – Sàil Ghorm (Blue Heel 776 m (2,546 ft); pronounced [s̪aːl ɣɔɾɔm]), Sàil Gharbh (Rough Heel 808 m (2,651 ft); pronounced [s̪aːl ɣaɾav]) and Spidean Còinich (Mossy Peak 764 m (2,507 ft); pronounced [s̪b̊id̊ʲan kɤːɲɪç]). From the north and from the road crossing the Kylesku Bridge, Quinag presents a formidable sight with its two huge buttresses of Sàil Gharbh and Sàil Ghorm dominating the skyline. It provides a backdrop to Loch Assynt, and seen from the road coming from the village of Lochinver, Quinag stretches as far as the eye can see. Spidean Coinich projects a broad south-east ridge which provides the usual ascent route for walkers.

The 8,400-acre (3,400-hectare) Quinag estate was purchased by the John Muir Trust in 2005. Quinag and Glencanisp estates share ownership of Loch Assynt.

Remnants of ancient woodland comprising birch, rowan, hazel, wych elm, aspen and oak are scattered throughout the northern side of the mountain particularly in the deep gulleys and sheltered situations near the seashore.

Quinag is mentioned in Iain Banks's 2007 novel The Steep Approach to Garbadale as lying just west of the estate of that name.

== See also ==
- Geology of Scotland
