= Drumbeg, Sutherland =

Coordinates: 58.242°N 5.199°W

Drumbeg: Scottish Gaelic: Drombaig
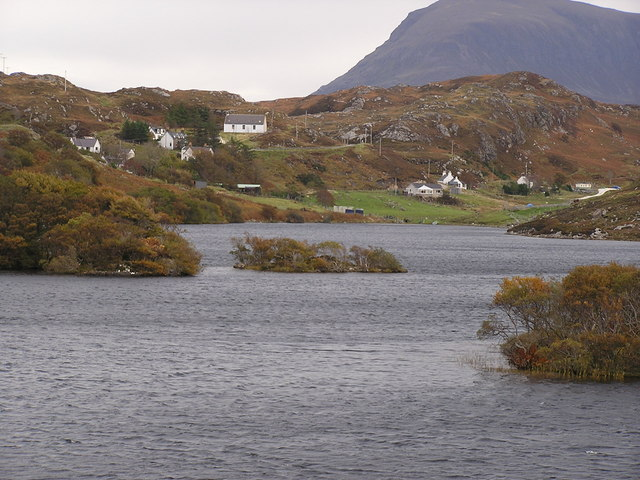
- View over Loch Drumbeg to the village of Drumbeg itself. In the background, Quinag can be seen rising in the distance

- Location within the Sutherland area
- Population: 101 (2011 settlement zones)
- OS grid reference: NC122327
- Council area: Highland
- Lieutenancy area: Sutherland
- Country: Scotland
- Sovereign state: United Kingdom
- Post town: Lairg
- Postcode district: IV27 4NW
- Dialling code: (01571) 833
- Police: Scotland
- Fire: Scottish
- Ambulance: Scottish
- UK Parliament: Caithness, Sutherland and Easter Ross
- Scottish Parliament: Caithness, Sutherland and Ross

Drumbeg (Scottish Gaelic: Drombaig) is a remote crofting village on the north west coast of Scotland in Assynt, Sutherland, Scottish Highlands and is in the Scottish council area of Highland.

The village of Drumbeg lies within a few hundred metres of one of Scotland's earliest known shipwrecks, first surveyed in 2012 by Wessex Archaeology and thought to be a Northern European trading vessel dating to the mid-seventeenth century. Wreck remains include three iron cannons. The significance of this wreck has been recognised in its legal designation as Scotland's first Historic Marine Protected Area, making it an offence to interfere with the wreck without a licence from the Scottish Government, although divers may visit the site on a 'look but don't touch' basis.

Scenes of the short film, Zip 'n Zoo were filmed in Drumbeg. Several of the villagers appeared in the film as extras.
