= Canisp =

Mountain in Scotland

Coordinates: 58.120906°N 5.052849°W

- Canasp
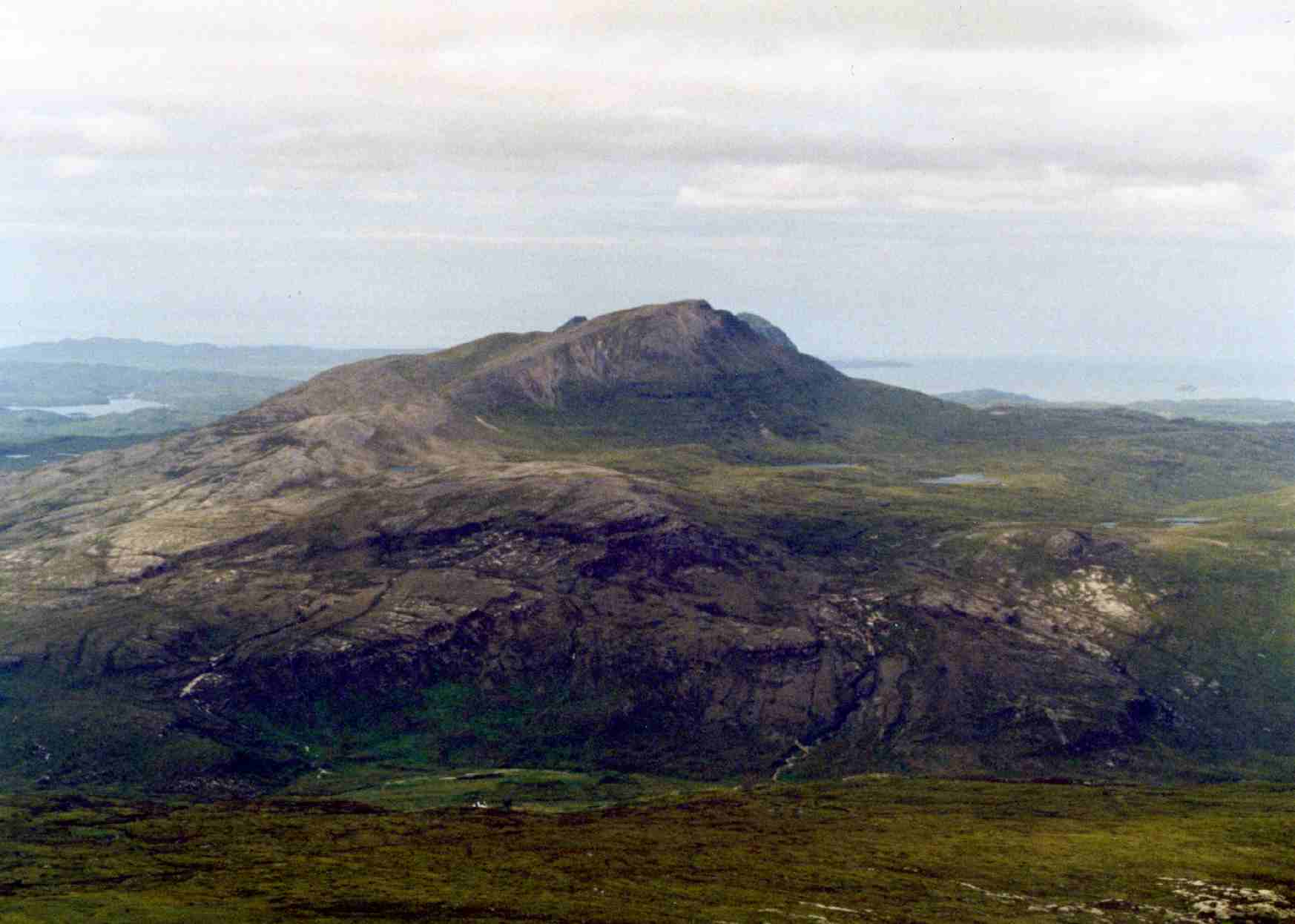
- Canisp seen from Conival, nine kilometres to the east.

Highest point
- Elevation: 847 m (2,779 ft)
- Prominence: 691 m (2,267 ft)Ranked 65th in British Isles
- Parent peak: Ben More Assynt
- Listing: Corbett, Marilyn

Naming
- English translation: White Mountain
- Language of name: Old Norse

Geography
- Location: Assynt, Scotland
- Parent range: Northwest Highlands
- OS grid: NC203187
- Topo map: OS Landranger 15, OS Explorer 442

Canisp (Scottish Gaelic: Canasp) is a mountain in the far north west of Scotland. It is situated in the parish of Assynt, in the county of Sutherland, 25 kilometres (16 mi) north of the town of Ullapool. Canisp reaches a height of 847 metres (2,779 ft) and qualifies as a Corbett and Marilyn hill. The mountain's name translates from the Old Norse kambsnípa or point of the comb/ridge.

== Geography and geology ==
Canisp is an isolated mountain that stands in the Glencanisp Forest, a large rock and water wilderness. It has a topographic prominence of 691 metres (2,267 ft). Canisp has little vegetation, even on its lower slopes large areas of Gneiss (one of the oldest rocks in the world) are visible on the surface.

Canisp stands in a geologically important area. It is part of the Moine Thrust Belt and is typical of many of the Assynt hills in that it rises from a base of Lewisian Gneiss and is composed of Torridonian sandstone capped by Cambrian quartzite giving the hill a distinctive light grey crown. Canisp was formed when surrounding rocks were eroded during an episode of glaciation, while the ridge was left poking above the level of the ice sheet, as a nunatak. Compared to the other Assynt hills, Canisp does not show any distinct topographic qualities. It has a symmetrical profile with two main ridges running northwest and southeast. Its southwestern flank has crags and scree and falls steeply into Glen Canisp, while its northeastern slopes also fall precipitously to the lochan studded moorland.

Canisp is less visited than the nearby smaller mountain of Suilven, with its famous jagged summit ridge, which stands five kilometres (3 mi) to the west and is 116 metres (381 ft) lower in elevation.

Canisp stands on the lands of the Glencanisp and Drumrunie Estates, a 44,000-acre (18,000-hectare) tract of land original owned by the Vestey family. In 2005, the Assynt Foundation, a group of around 900 local residents, purchased the estate for £2,900,000.

== Ascents ==
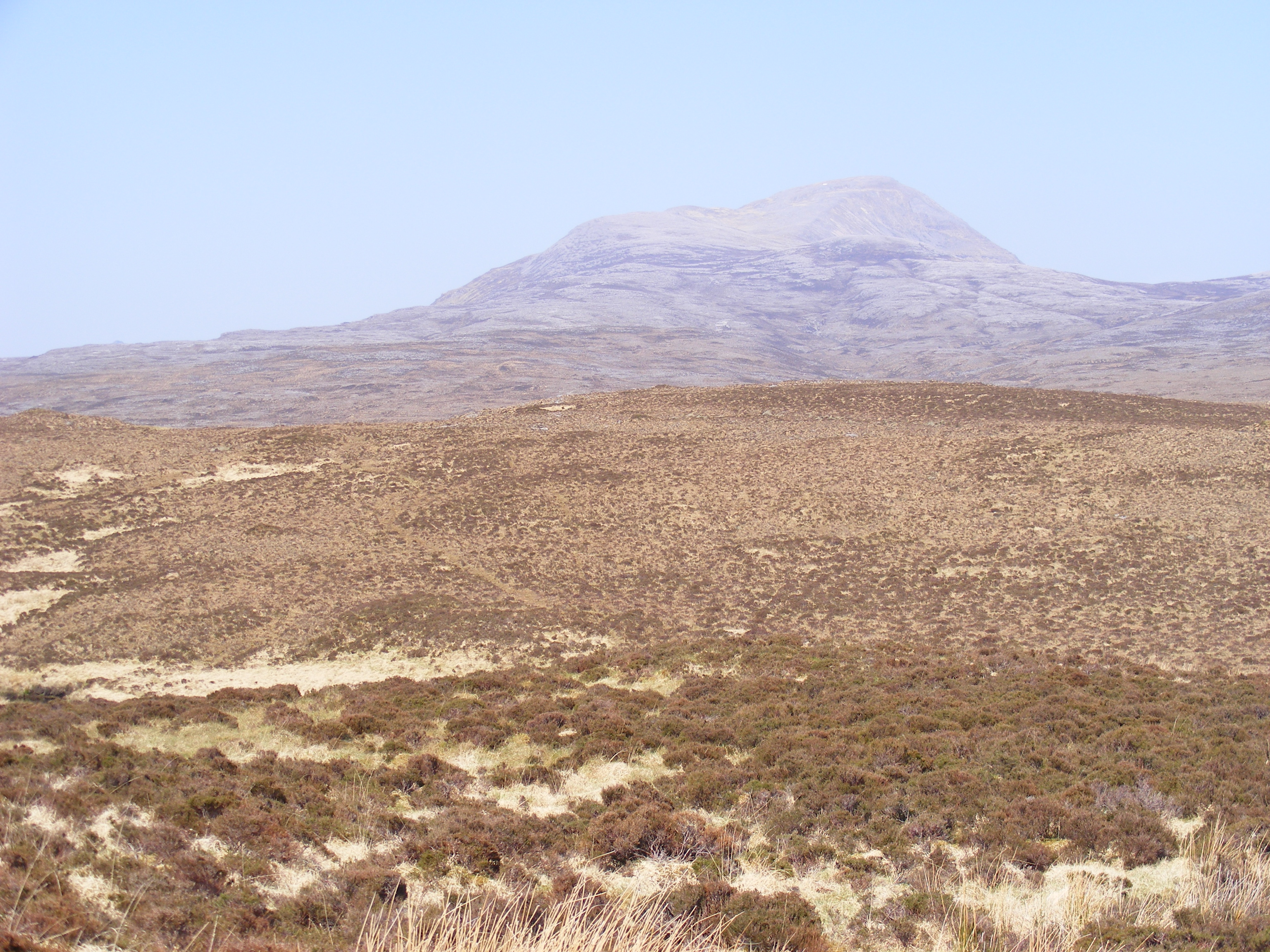
Canisp from the main starting point, to the east

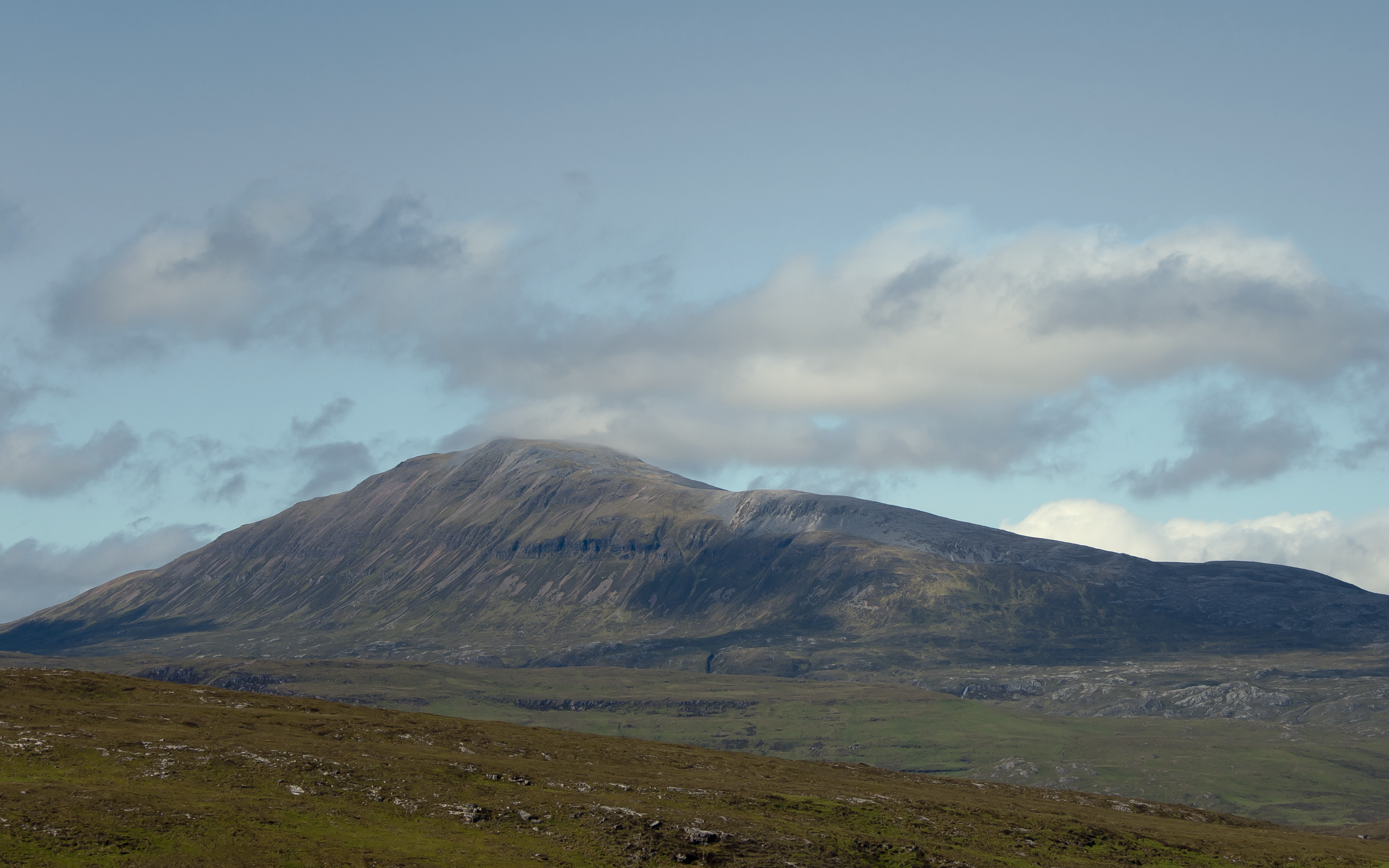
Canisp from Knockan Crag

The most popular ascent of Canisp starts at the north end of Loch Awe (NC249160) where there is car parking and a footbridge to cross the River Loanan as it leaves the loch. The route gains the summit by the south east ridge. This is the shortest and quickest route, but it is still six kilometres (3 1/2 mi) long, almost completely devoid of paths, and defended by stones, heather and bog. Another ascent from the east which also uses the southeast ridge starts at Stronchrubie where there is also a footbridge over the Loanan. Longer ascents are also possible from Lochinver and Ledmore Junction, both these routes utilise the path between the two places that traverses the length of Glen Canisp before leaving the glen to climb the mountain by either its northwest ridge (from Lochinver) or southeast ridge (from Ledmore). The route from Lochinver gains the northwest ridge by a path from Loch na Gainimh and is regarded by Hamish Brown as the most pleasing way up the mountain. The summit of Canisp is marked by a large stone built wind shelter. The view from the top of the mountain is regarded as one of the finest in Scotland giving all round views taking in the surrounding loch studded moorland, The Minch beyond Lochinver and most of the well known mountains of Assynt.

== See also ==
- Stac Pollaidh
- Suilven
