= Loch Inver =

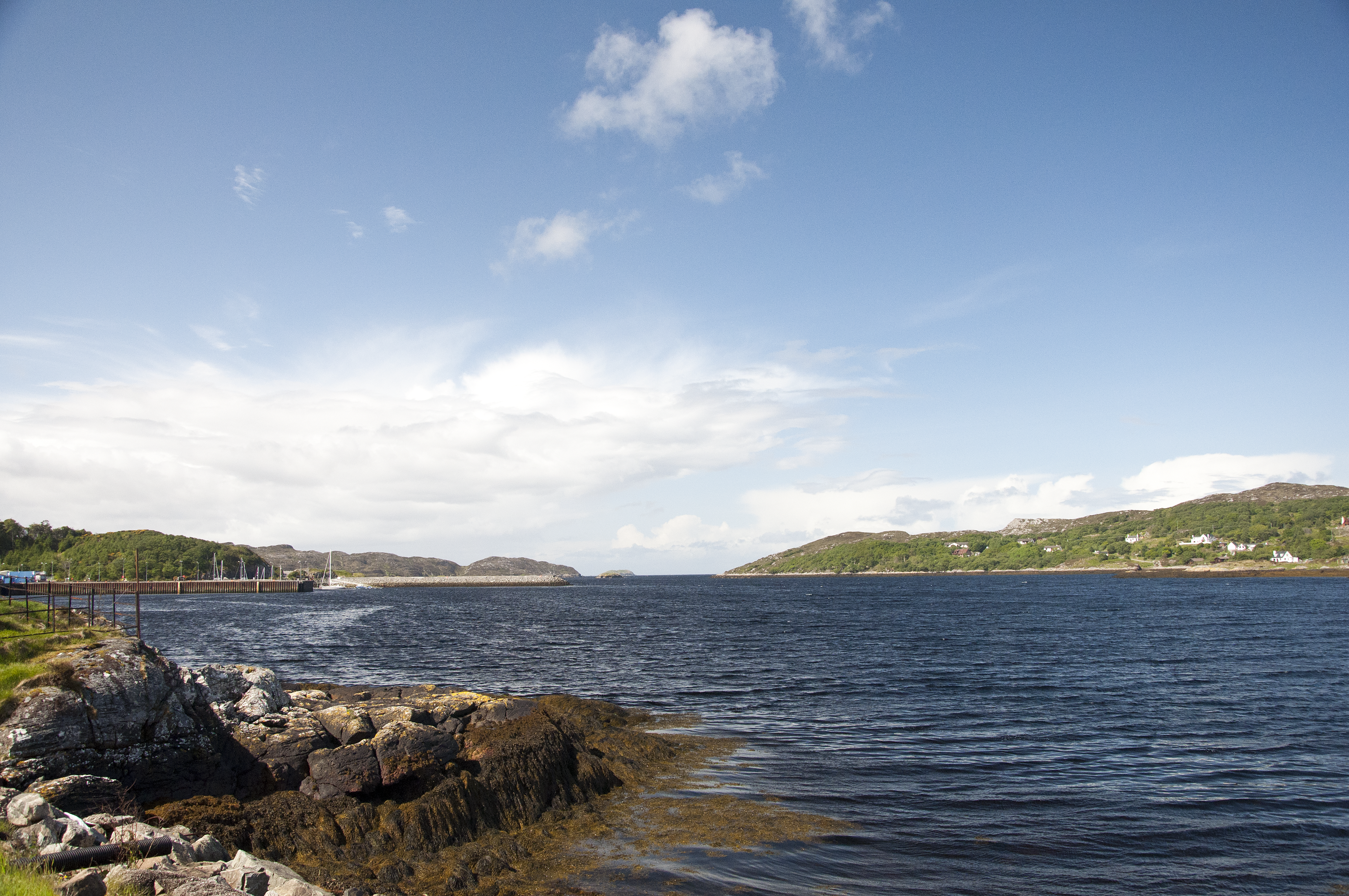

- Location within Sutherland
- Location: grid reference NC 0707 2213
- Coordinates: 58.14590073°N 5.27956005°W
- Type: Sea Loch
- Basin countries: Scotland, United Kingdom
- Salinity: Seawater
- Surface elevation: Sea Level
- Frozen: No

Loch Inver is a 3.62-kilometre-long (1 61/64-nautical-mile) sea loch in Assynt, Sutherland and is on the northwest coast of Scotland. The loch meets the coastal embayment of Enard Bay at the north end and The Minch, where it meets Soyea Island at its mouth. The village of Lochinver is at the head of the loch.

== Geography ==
At the head of the bay is Soyea Island. It is small rocky uninhabited island whose radial axis lies on a horizontal line, the same as the bay, and is located 1 3/4 nmi (3 km) from Badnaban on a bearing of broadly east if slightly north and 2 nmi (4 km) south-southwest of Achmelvich.

== Gallery ==
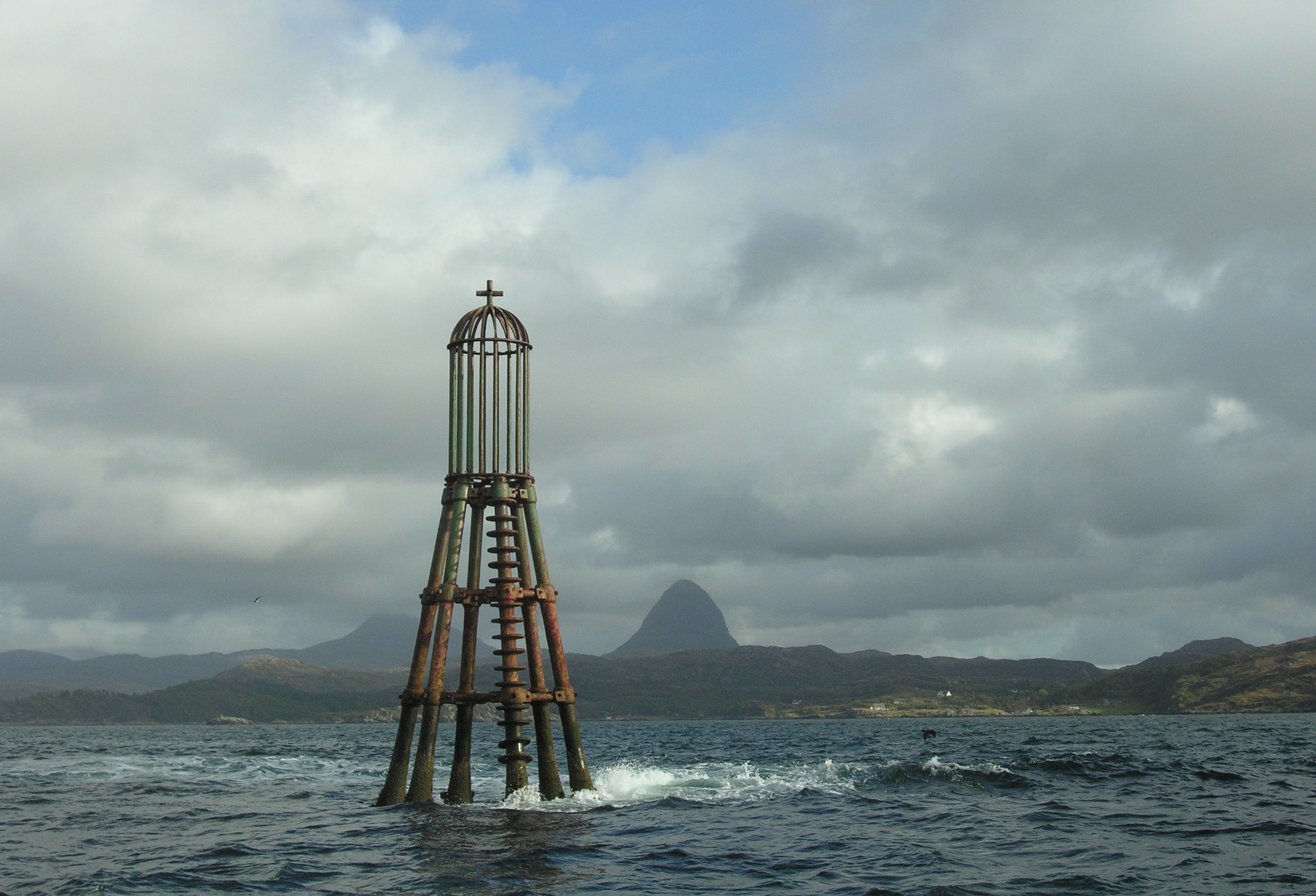
Navigation beacon far out on Loch Inver

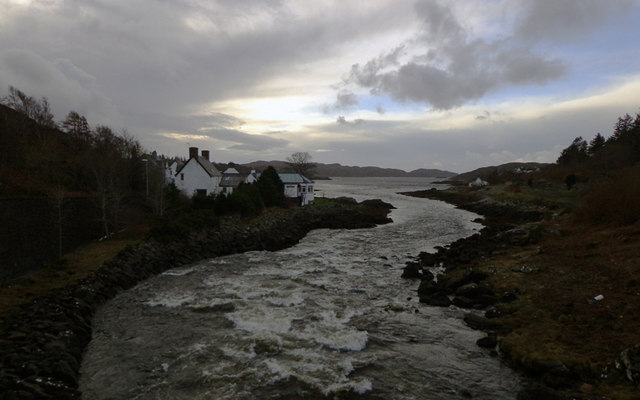
River Inver entering Loch Inver at dusk

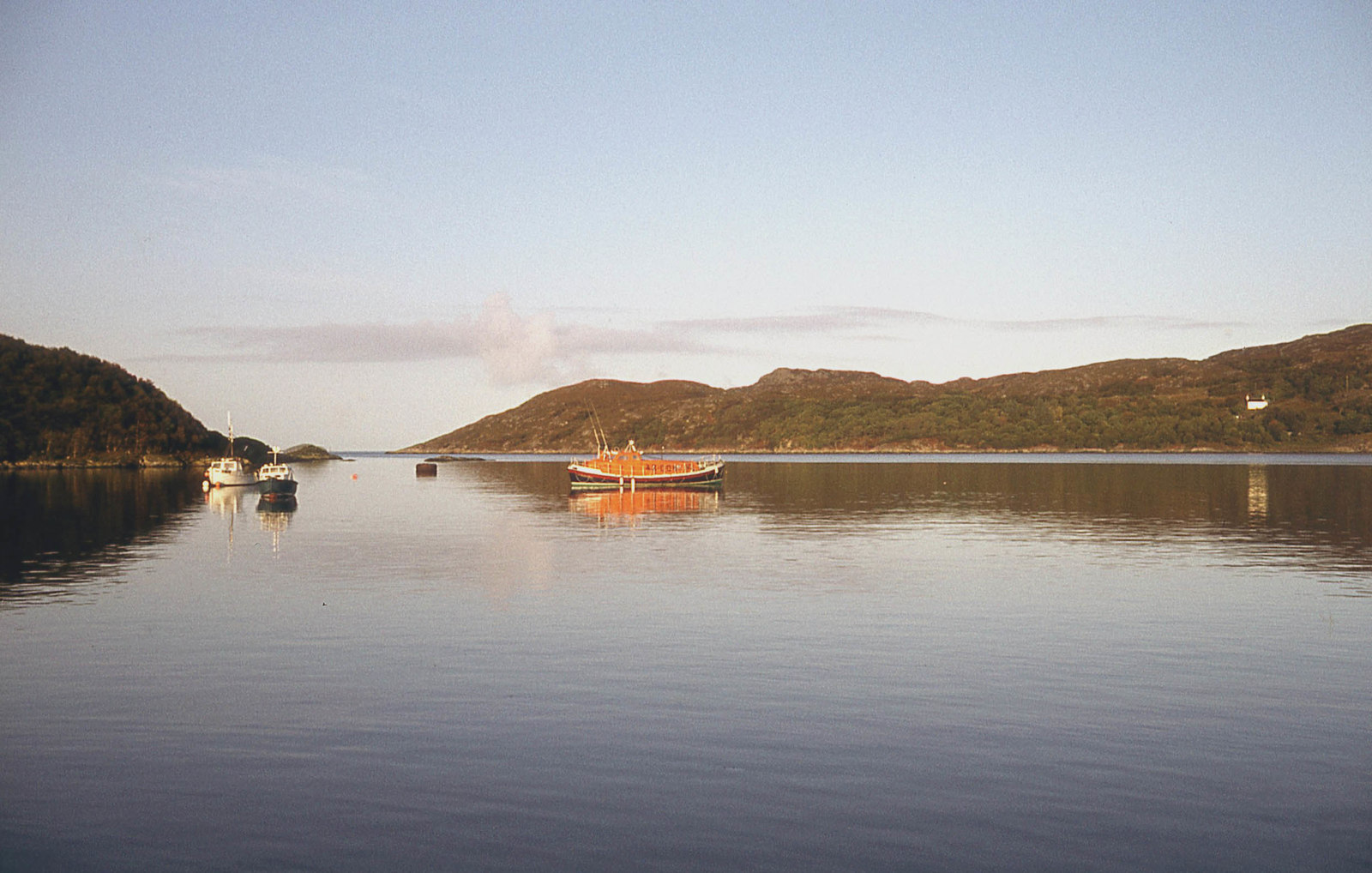
Loch Inver from the west, the inner sea loch
