= Lochinver =

Coordinates: 58.14590073°N 5.27956005°W

Lochinver: Scottish Gaelic: Loch an Inbhir
- Village
- Location within the Sutherland area
- Population: 651 (2011)
- OS grid reference: NC094225
- Council area: Highland
- Lieutenancy area: Sutherland
- Country: Scotland
- Sovereign state: United Kingdom
- Post town: Lairg
- Postcode district: IV27
- Dialling code: 01571
- Police: Scotland
- Fire: Scottish
- Ambulance: Scottish
- UK Parliament: Caithness, Sutherland and Easter Ross
- Scottish Parliament: Caithness, Sutherland and Ross constituency in the Highlands and Islands electoral region

Lochinver (Loch an Inbhir in Gaelic) is a village at the head of the sea loch Loch Inver, on the coast in the Assynt district of Sutherland, Highland, Scotland. A few miles north-east is Loch Assynt which is the source of the River Inver which flows into Loch Inver at the village. There are 200 or so lochans in the area, popular with anglers. Lochinver is dominated by the "sugar loaf" shape of Caisteal Liath, the summit peak of nearby Suilven.

== Geography ==
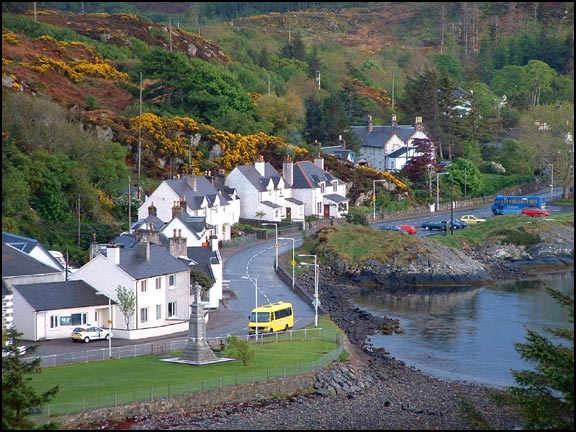
Lochinver

Lochinver, as a fishing port, is frequented by European fishermen primarily from Spain and France. The port underwent a major renewal project in the 1990s when the harbour area was rebuilt and a new and improved loading area was created. This new development involved blasting an area of several hectares out of the surrounding rock.

In 2020, Lochinver was the fourth largest whitefish (demersal) port, with over £14 million of fish and shellfish passing through the port (of which £1.6 million was landed by Scottish vessels).

The village, part of Assynt, attracts local tourism, with nature areas being developed in conjunction with small-scale forestry activities. Birdlife in Lochinver includes the curlew, oystercatcher and hooded crow.

Nearby villages include Inverkirkaig, accessed by the road leading up the River Culag, and on the coastal road north: Achmelvich, Clachtoll, Clashmore, Stoer, Clashnessie, Drumbeg and Culkein Drumbeg.

=== The White Shore ===
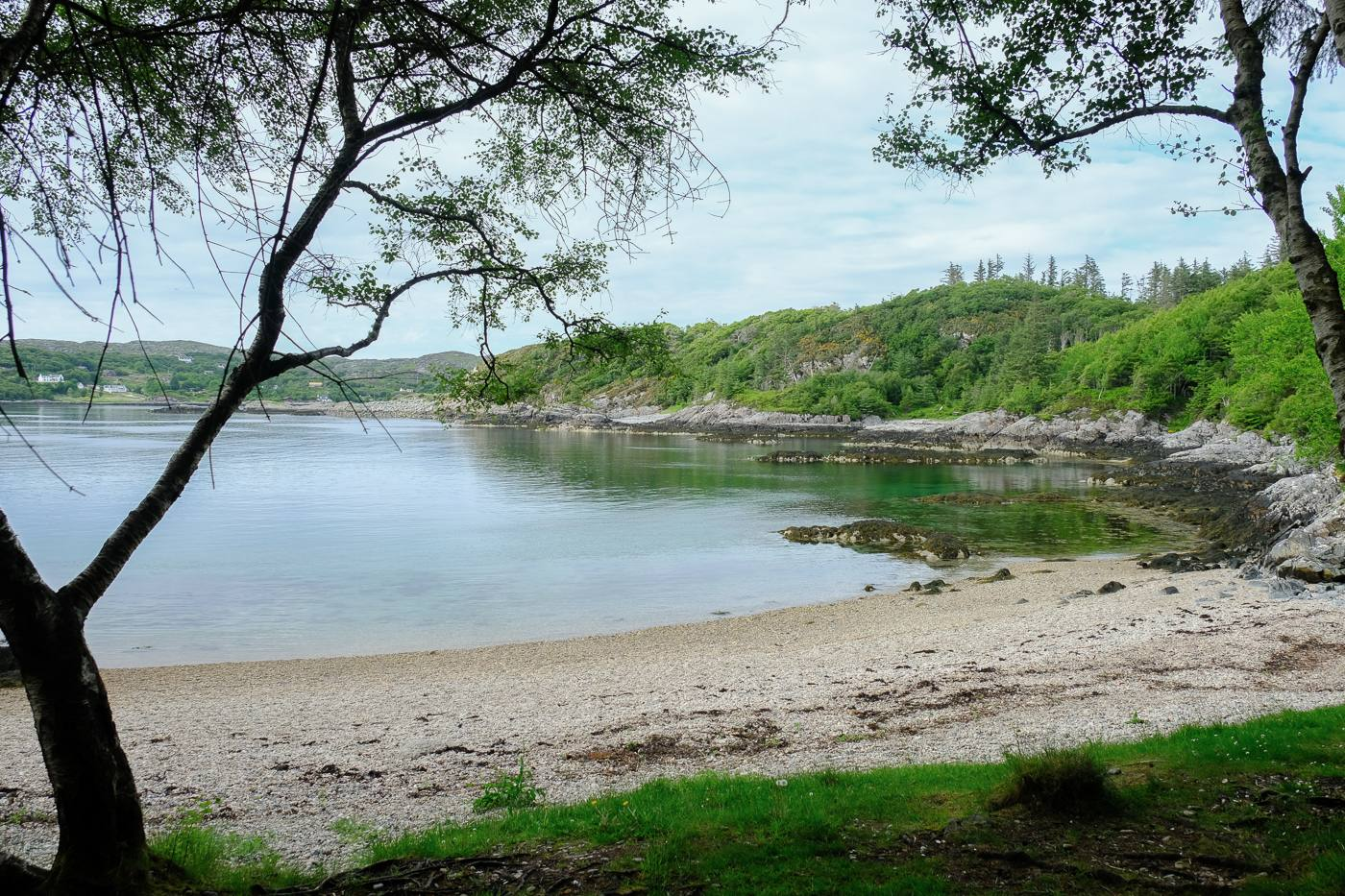
The White Shore

The White Shore is named after its gneiss and quartzite pebbles. It is a one mile walk from one of two access points: one from the pier, the other at the head of Loch Culag locally known as the School Loch. The stone beach is surrounded by the Culag Woods which is managed by the Culag Community Woodland Trust (CCWT).

=== The Culag Woods ===
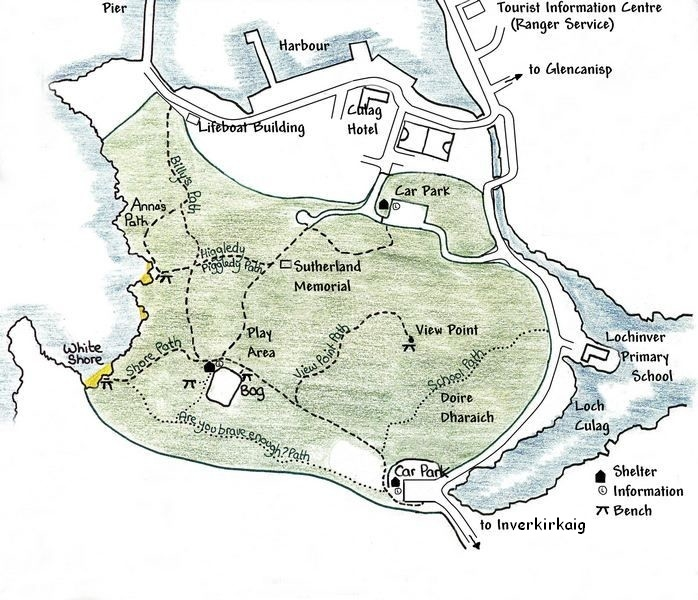
Map of the Culag Woods

Overlooking Lochinver, a 40-hectare (99 acres) woodland is a blend of forested and coastal views backed by Suilven peak. In 1847, George Cranwell, the second duke and twentieth earl of Sutherland, established the paths and planted the trees that became known as the Culag woods. Since 1995, the Culag Community Woodland Trust has overseen the wood under a fifty-year lease from Assynt Estates and Highland Council, and owns the Little Assynt Estate which it acquired in 2000. In 2003, the Trust purchased an office for administration and outreach to locals, visitors, and partner organisations.

== Education ==
Lochinver has a primary school situated on the banks of Loch Culag. It serves the village of Lochinver, and the outlying areas of Achmelvich to the north, Inverkirkaig to the south and Elphin to the east. The school is housed in the old village school which has been extended over the years. For secondary age pupils, a daily bus service is provided to village of Ullapool, 34 miles south.

== Religion ==
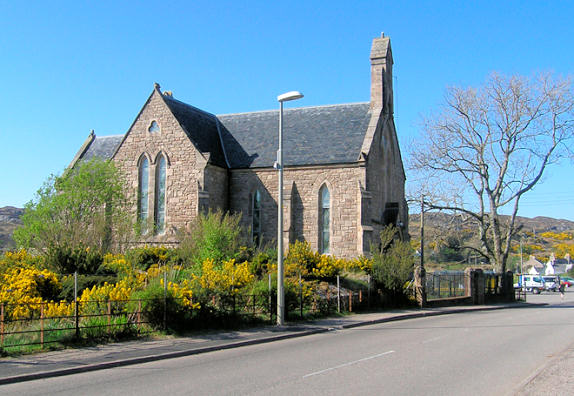
The Church of Scotland - Lochinver

Lochinver has three churches, The Church of Scotland, The Free Church and The Free Presbyterian Church. The Free Presbyterian Church no longer has services on a Sunday; local people attend at Ullapool.

== Proposed railway link ==
In the 1890s, it was suggested that a railway be constructed from Culrain to Lochinver, to 'open up' the Highlands and provide a direct rail connection with ferries to the Western Isles. This scheme was an alternative to a proposed route to Ullapool from Garve. In the event, neither were able to obtain funding.

== Media ==
The Highlands and Islands - A Royal Tour, is a 1973 documentary about Prince Charles' visit to the Highlands and Islands, directed by Oscar Marzaroli.

The 2017 film Edie about a widowed pensioner who climbs Suilven, was directed by Simon Hunter.

The 2024 DS Max Craigie novel The Devil You Know, by Neil Lancaster, includes action scenes at Lochinver Police Station, with mention of the war memorial, the Lochinver Larder, and Lochinver Lifeboat Station.
