= North West Highlands Geopark =

UNESCO Geopark in the Scottish Highlands

Coordinates: 58°7′N 5°8′W

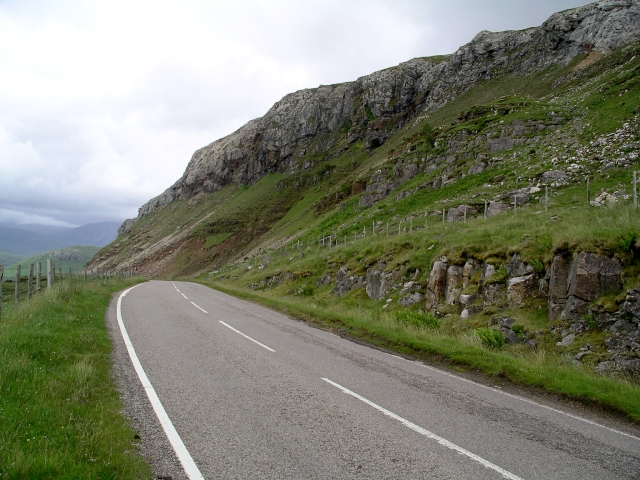
Knockan Crag

The North West Highlands Geopark is a geopark in the Scottish Highlands. Awarded UNESCO geopark status in 2004, it was Scotland's first geopark, featuring some of the oldest rocks in Europe, around 3,000 million years old. The park contains many notable geological features, such as the Moine Thrust Belt and Smoo Cave and covers an area of around 2,000 square kilometres (770 sq mi).

== Geography ==
The park is located in the extreme north-west of Scotland and includes parts of Sutherland and Wester Ross, including Cape Wrath. The area is one of the most sparsely inhabited in Europe, and is largely treeless. The park's eastern boundary generally follows the Moine Thrust Belt, otherwise the park is generally bounded by the north and west coasts of Scotland, with a few islands included in the park, such as the Summer Isles.

== Notable features ==
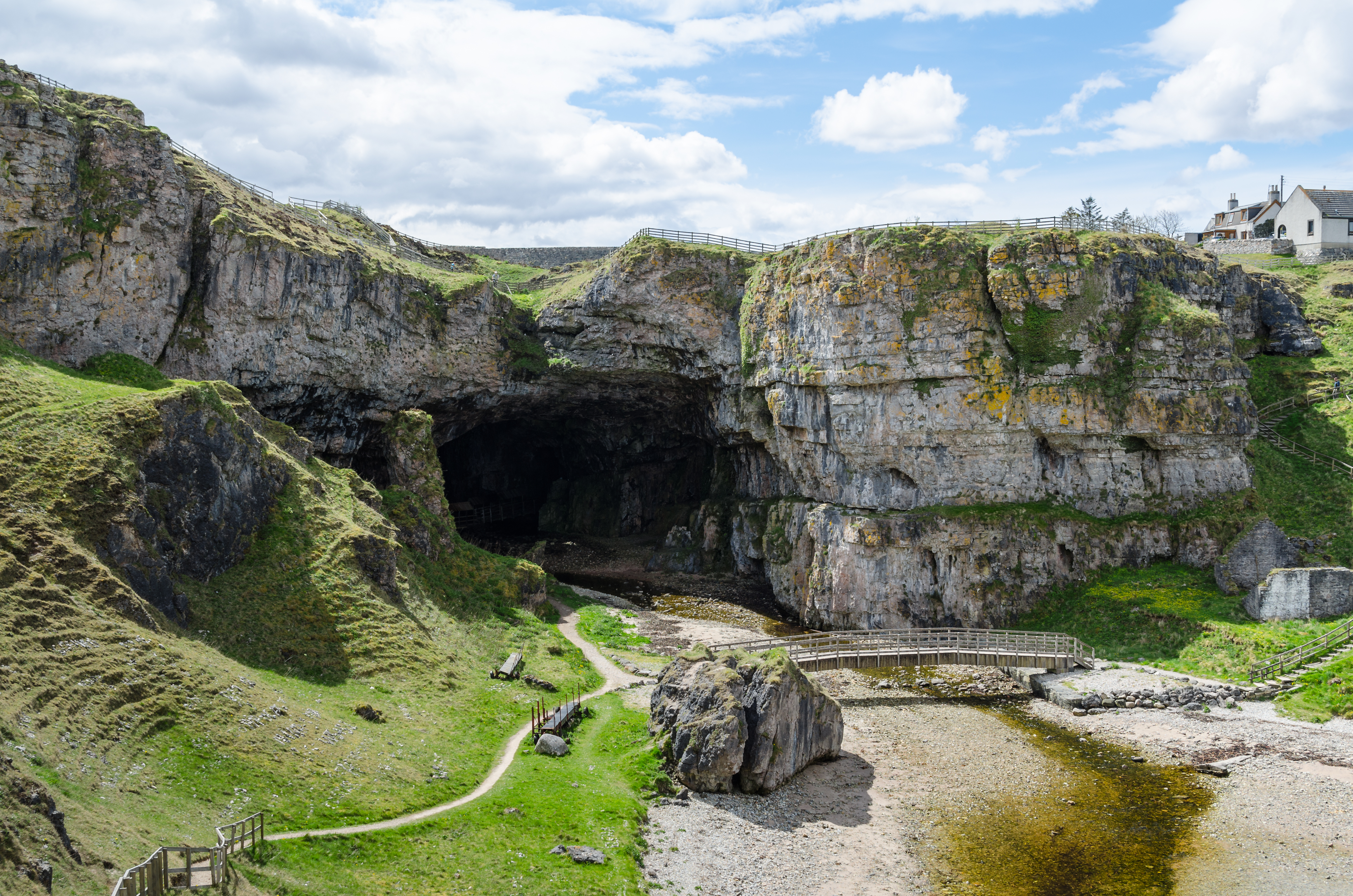
Smoo Cave

The Moine Thrust Belt was formed between 430 and 500 million years ago. The belt includes Precambrian Moine rocks which have been pushed on top of younger Cambrian and Ordovician rocks, much to the surprise of Victorian geologists. A debate ensued between prominent geologists of the time. Roderick Murchison and Archibald Geikie argued that the Moine rocks must in fact be younger than the rocks beneath them, a point of view opposed by James Nicol and Charles Lapworth. The controversy, the so-called "Highlands Controversy", was resolved by Ben Peach and John Horne who found that the Moine rocks had been pushed some 70 kilometres east over the top of the younger rocks by tectonic action. This was the first thrust fault to be discovered. A monument to the pair is located within the park. Its inscription reads: To Ben N Peach and John Horne who played the foremost part in unravelling the geological structure of the North West Highlands 1883–1897. An international tribute. Erected 1930. The fault can be seen most easily at a line of cliffs named Knockan Crag. This crag is where the Moine is where the apparent anomaly in the ages of the rocks was first seen, and is where the thrust belt was first identified. A visitor's centre is located here, as well as several pieces of sculpture created by modern artists.

The area contains a number of limestone caves. The most well known of these is Smoo Cave, a large sea cave near Durness. This cave is unique within the UK in that its outer chamber was formed by the action of seawater, while the inner chambers were formed by fresh water. Its entrance 15 metres high, is the largest entrance of any sea cave in the British Isles. Archaeological excavations have found evidence of human habitation dating back to the Mesolithic period. The cave became well known after Sir Walter Scott visited it in 1814. Another notable cave site is the Inchnadamph Bone Caves. At these caves, remains of Eurasian lynx, brown bear, Arctic fox, reindeer and polar bears have been found; as well as human remains dated between 4,515 and 4,720 years old. Uamh an Claonaite, Scotland's longest cave is partly located below these Bone Caves.

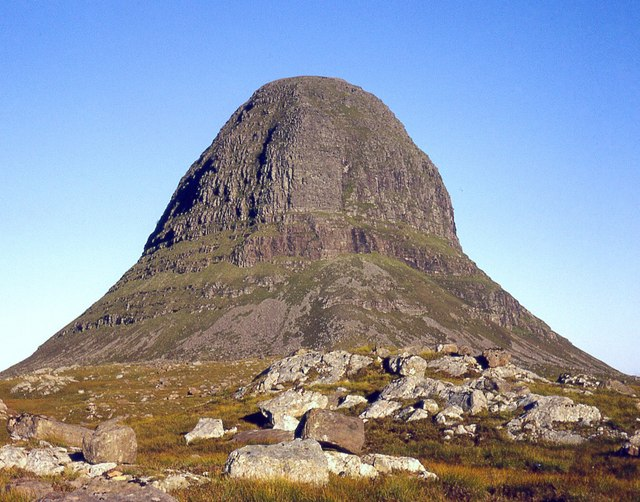
Suilven, one of the park's mountains

Also located in the park is Cape Wrath, the northwesternmost point on the Scottish mainland, which features the highest vertical cliffs in mainland Britain. Another feature is the Old Man of Stoer, a sandstone sea stack located off the Point of Stoer in Assynt.

=== Mountains ===
The Moine Thrust Belt is regarded as the northwest boundary of the Caledonian mountain belt. However, a few mountains exist within the park, some of which are well known. The highly distinctive Suilven is perhaps the most notable mountain within the park, and its image is used in promotional material. Other mountains to be found here include Stac Pollaidh, Canisp, Quinag, Foinaven and Arkle.

== Geology ==
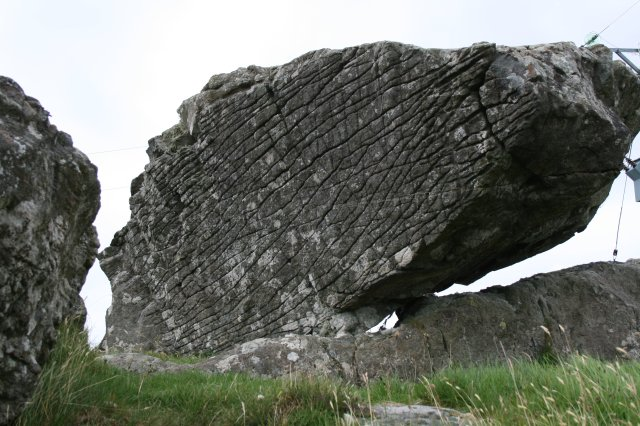
A large boulder of Lewisian Gneiss within the geopark

The park contains a wide variety of different types of rock:

- Lewisian Gneiss – Metamorphic rocks, ranging from pink to grey-green in colour, depending on the rock they were originally formed from. Around 3,000 million years old, making them the oldest rocks in Britain, and, along with similar rocks in Bulgaria, Finland, the Lofoten Islands of Norway, and Russia, among the oldest in Europe.
- Torridonian Sandstone – red-brown, coarse. Around 1,000 million years old. Many of the area's mountains are composed of this rock.
- Basal Quartzite – White to pink quartzite. Some of this contains fossilized worm burrows and is known as pipe rock. c. 500 million years old. Largely located within and around the park's thrust faults.
- Durness Limestone – Pale to dark grey in colour. Around 480 million years old. Also located within and around thrust faults. Often contains caves, such as Smoo Cave and the Inchnadamph Bone Caves.
- Moine Rocks – Metamorphosed sandstone and mudstone. Around 980 million years old. Concentrated at the eastern edge of the park, as these rocks tend to be found to the east of the Moine Thrust Belt.
- Igneous rocks – Granite, syenite, porphyry; containing feldspar and quartz. Various ages. A comparatively rare type of rock in the park, which largely contains metamorphic and sedimentary rocks.

== See also ==
- International Network of Geoparks
- List of Geoparks
- Sustainable tourism
