= Highlands controversy of Northwest Scotland =

19th-century geological controversy

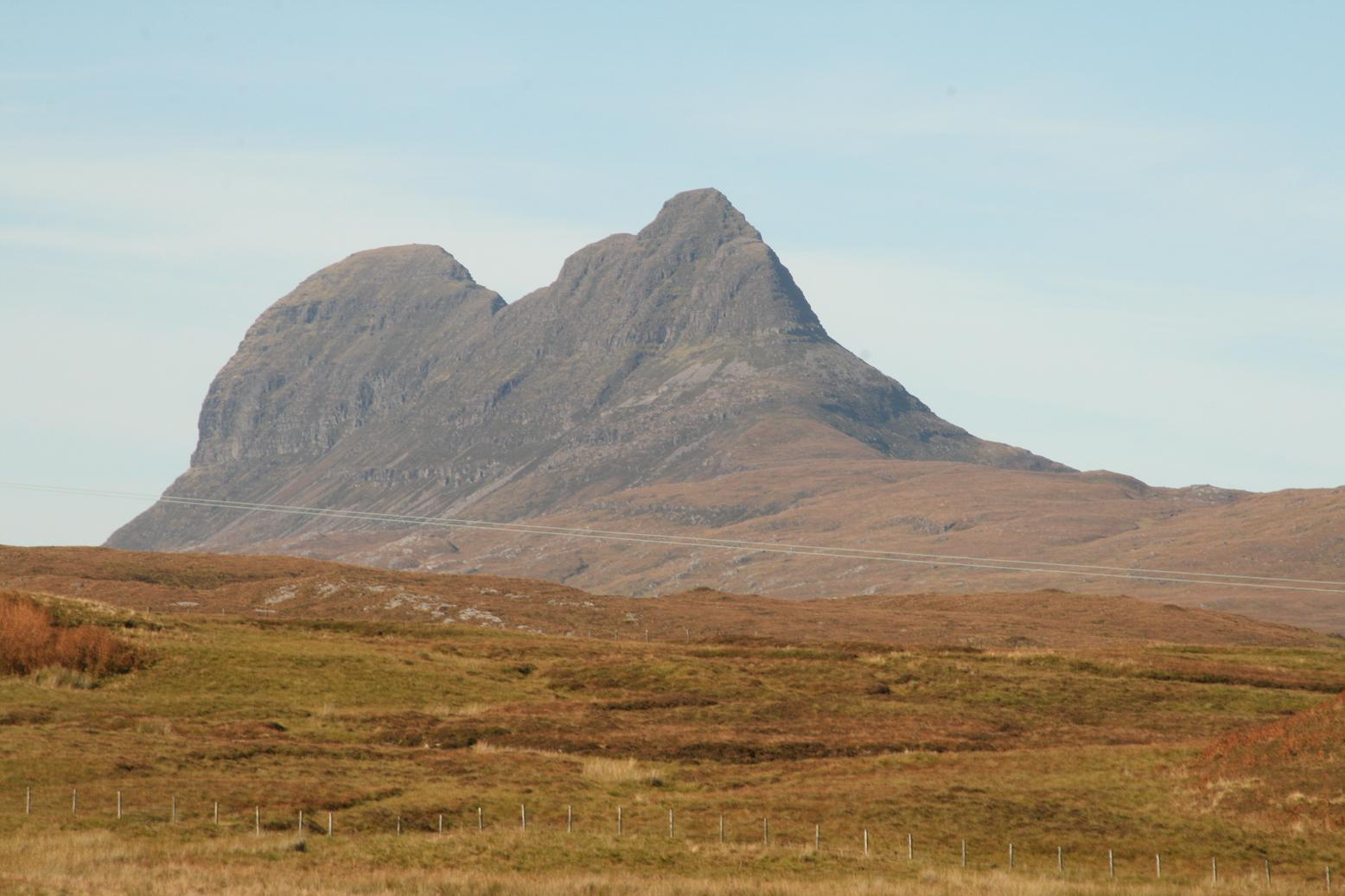
Suilven, Northwest Highlands – Torridonian sandstone standing on a base of Lewisian gneiss

The Highlands controversy was a scientific controversy which started between British geologists in the middle of the nineteenth century concerning the nature of the rock strata in the Northwest Highlands of Scotland. The disagreement stemmed from the apparent ages of the strata, particularly the existence, now confirmed, of older rock above younger rock as well as duplicated and inverted strata, which could not be satisfactorily explained by contemporary geology. This rock formation and surrounding controversy were the impetus for Albert Heim's theory of thrust faulting, which, in conjunction with anticlines and imbrication, are now commonly accepted as the primary geological mechanisms that created the Northwest Highlands rock strata.

At the time, the debate became contentious, even acrimonious, because of some of the personalities involved and because it pitted professional geologists of the Geological Survey against academic and amateur geologists. An initial resolution was achieved by about 1886 but the great complexity and scientific importance of the discovery of the Moine Thrust Belt and the geological processes involved in its creation led to field work continuing for a further twenty years culminating in the 1907 publication by the Geological Survey of a book of fundamental geological significance: The Geological Structure of the North-West Highlands of Scotland.

The acrimony was an important factor in the political decision to set up the Wharton Committee of 1899 to review the state-funded Geological Survey. The committee's report probably precipitated the retiral of Archibald Geikie, the Survey's director-general, who had been slow to accept the new geological paradigm. However, in retirement Geikie's status flourished as he went on to become president both of the Geological Society and the Royal Society and to receive the Order of Merit.

The northwest highlands region of Scotland is now known to be where part of the Iapetus Ocean closed with the collision of the continents of Laurentia and Baltica about 400 million years ago. The consequent Caledonian Orogeny produced intense folding and compression of rocks – at thrust faults older rock strata slid for miles over younger rocks and, at nappes, the sequences of rock strata became inverted and duplicated at overturned anticlines.

== Background ==
=== Geological science in the mid nineteenth century ===
Derived from Page & Lapworth (1883) (clickable image)

From around 1830 geologists were beginning to date rocks according to the embedded fossils. The law of superposition whereby younger rocks lie above older ones was very well established and it was recognised that some layers may be missing because they had been eroded away. Folding and faulting of strata were recognised and in 1841 Arnold Escher von der Linth discovered that sometimes older rocks lay above younger ones. However his explanation involved such large horizontal movements of rock and folding on such a massive scale that he was afraid to publish his results because his theory would seem ridiculous. It was not until after his death that his pupil Albert Heim published the findings in 1878. Thrust faulting involving a considerable horizontal movement of older strata over younger had not yet been identified.

Roderick Murchison's expedition to Wales in 1831 led to his identification of the Silurian period and he came to regard the Silurian geological system as being his own territory. (Note: His sometimes sceptical colleagues sometimes referred to Murchison as the "King of Siluria".) He went on to decide that Silurian rocks extended into parts of England and southern Scotland and this caused bitter arguments with his friend Adam Sedgwick who had previously identified the rocks as Cambrian − the intervening Ordovician period was yet to be characterised. Murchison identified the Silurian on the basis of the types of fossils the rocks contained whereas earlier geologists had studied the type of rock. The strength of Murchison's views became buttressed by his knighthood in 1846 and when he was appointed director-general of the Geological Survey in 1855 he decided to turn his researches to the little-known and even less understood Northwest Highlands of Scotland expecting to extend his Silurian domain up there.

=== Northwest Highlands of Scotland ===
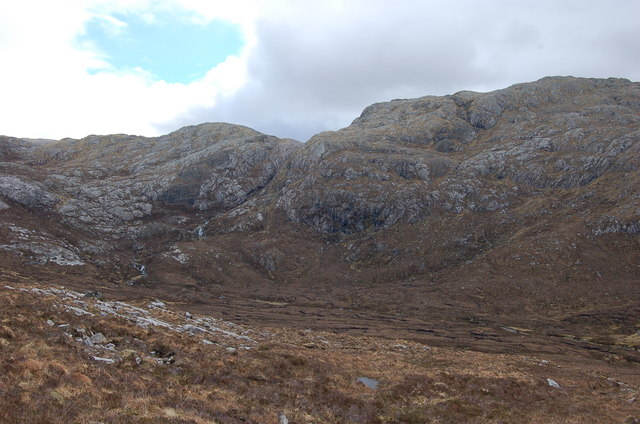
Lewisian gneiss at Assynt

The Northwest Highlands were, and still are, remote and difficult to access. Along a coastal strip some 200 kilometres (120 mi) long and 15–25 kilometres (10–15 mi) wide the terrain is austere with isolated mountains rising above barren lower ground where knolls of bare rock lie among lochans and peat bogs. This geological region runs from the Sleat peninsula of Skye northward through Kyle of Lochalsh, Ullapool and Assynt to Cape Wrath and Loch Eriboll.

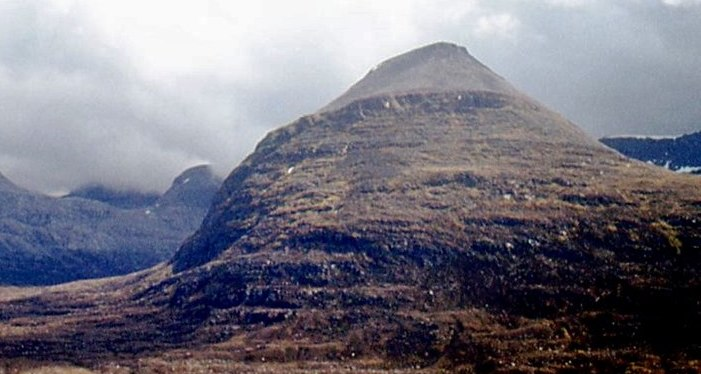
Quartzite summit over sandstone on Beinn Eighe, Torridon

Assynt offers diverse geological formations and varied landscapes. The low-lying terrain to the west consists of Lewisian gneiss, a hard metamorphic rock that represents some of the oldest bedrock in Britain. Overlying this basement are relatively undisturbed sequences of Torridonian sandstone, quartzite, and Durness limestone. Historically, dating these strata presented challenges: the sandstone yielded no fossils, the fossilized trace fossils known as 'Pipe Rock' within the quartzite were not initially recognized as organic in origin, and the fossils within the limestone could not be definitively dated at the time. (Note: "Pipe Rock" is quartzite containing the traces of burrows of skolithos marine worms.) Further east, the landscape is characterized by strongly metamorphosed Moine rocks, which in some areas overlie non-metamorphosed strata.

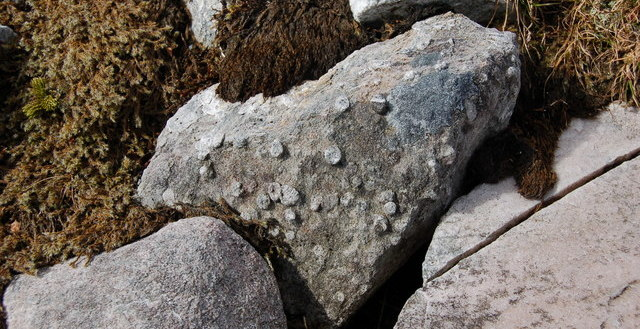
Pipe rock from Assynt

For nineteenth-century geologists, this was a major puzzle because younger rocks are expected to lie above older ones and so non-metamorphosed should lie above metamorphosed – what were the ages of the rocks and why did they seem to be in the wrong order? Why had seemingly upper and lower layers of quartzite apparently been discovered both above and below basement gneiss?

== Murchison and Nicol in the Northwest Highlands ==
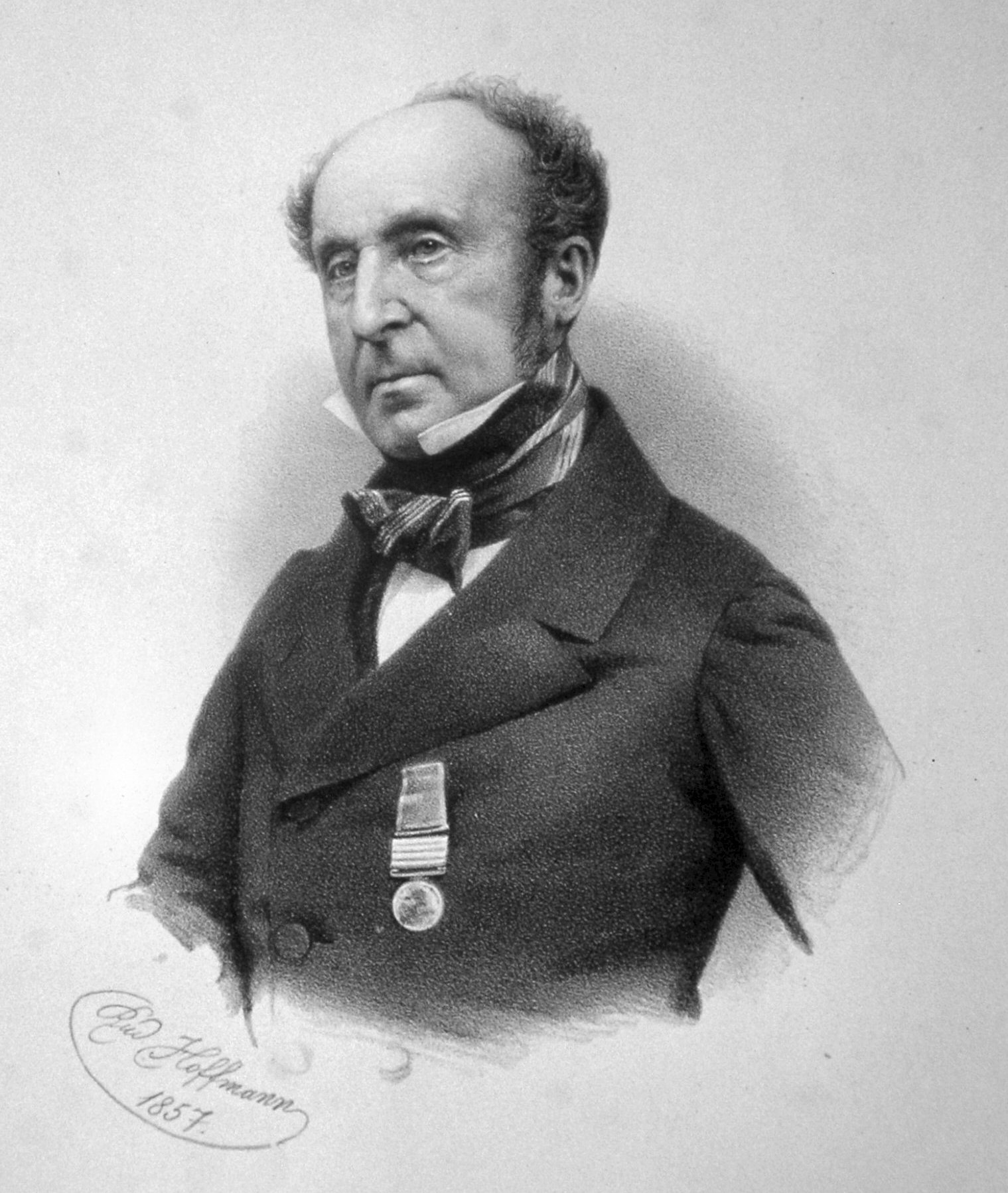
Roderick Murchison, 1857

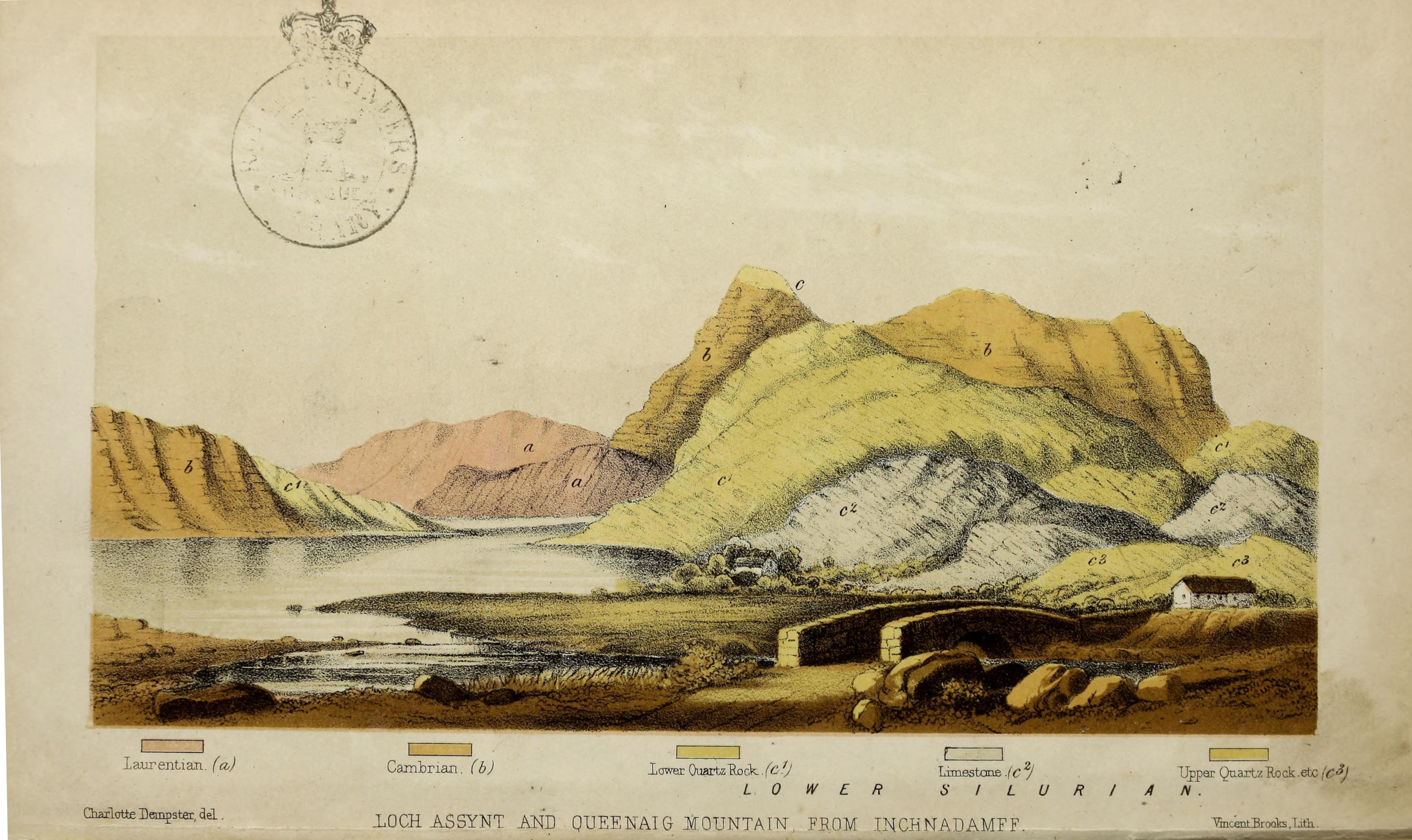
Murchison's Silurian concept of Loch Assynt and Quinag, 1872 but published as early as 1859

In 1827 Murchison had made a cursory survey of the area from the sea but in 1855, hearing news of the discovery of fossils in the limestone at Durness, he visited again with James Nicol, professor of geology at Aberdeen University. (Note: The fossils had been discovered by Charles Peach an amateur naturalist and fossil hunter who sometimes accompanied Murchison on field trips. He was the father of Ben Peach.) The fossils were thought to be Devonian and the limestone was clearly more recent than the underlying sandstone. This was a problem because the sandstone, later to be called Torridonian sandstone, was thought to be equivalent to the Old Red Sandstone on the east coast of Scotland which certainly contained Devonian fossils. Because of the conditions on the ground they were unable to conduct a thorough geological survey but Murchison considered there was an ascending series (becoming younger) of strata exposed on the surface as one moved west to east. He concluded that this exemplified the stratigraphic column of Britain. The strata must dip down from west to east, he thought, so at any particular elevation the rocks towards the east were younger than those to the west and so, he assumed, the schist and gneiss of the north of Scotland were Silurian sediments above a basement.

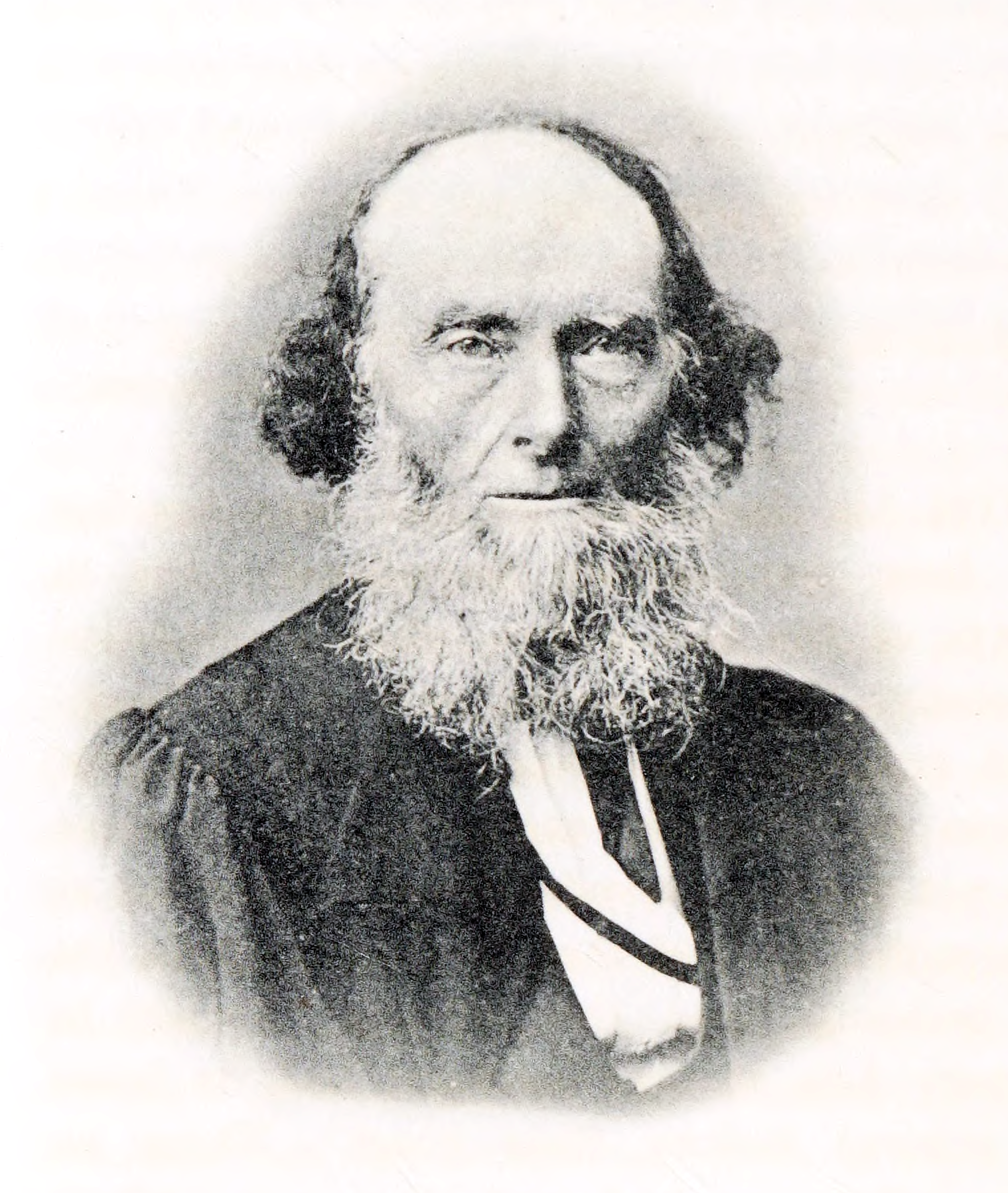
James Nicol

James Nicol, professor of geology at Aberdeen University disagreed. Following a separate visit in 1856 he claimed that a geological fault ran right down along the northwest coast and that the seemingly younger rocks were in reality far older having been shifted upwards compared with those to the west. (Note: Nicol supposed a somewhat vertical fault. Highly inclined thrust faults were yet to be discovered (by Peach and Horne).) A matter that was to become especially difficult was that Murchison considered that there were two quartzite layers of different age at two stratigraphic levels whereas Nicol claimed there was one layer but vertically displaced along the fault. However both geologists had to gloss over the difficulty that the quartzite was greatly folded and in some places seemed to fold over itself.

In 1859, following another tour of the highlands when he was accompanied by his second-in-command at the Geological Survey, Andrew Ramsay, Murchison addressed a British Association in Aberdeen where he explained what he considered was the essential simplicity of the geology of the north of Scotland. It seems his lecture was regarded as a triumph by the attendees and by The Times and the Scottish press. John Phillips spoke of the high estimation in which Murchison was held as "master of the Silurian". Nicol, meanwhile, had been preoccupied organising the geology section of the meeting – his paper hardly got a mention in the press and seems to have received little support at the meeting.

== Murchison involves Geikie ==
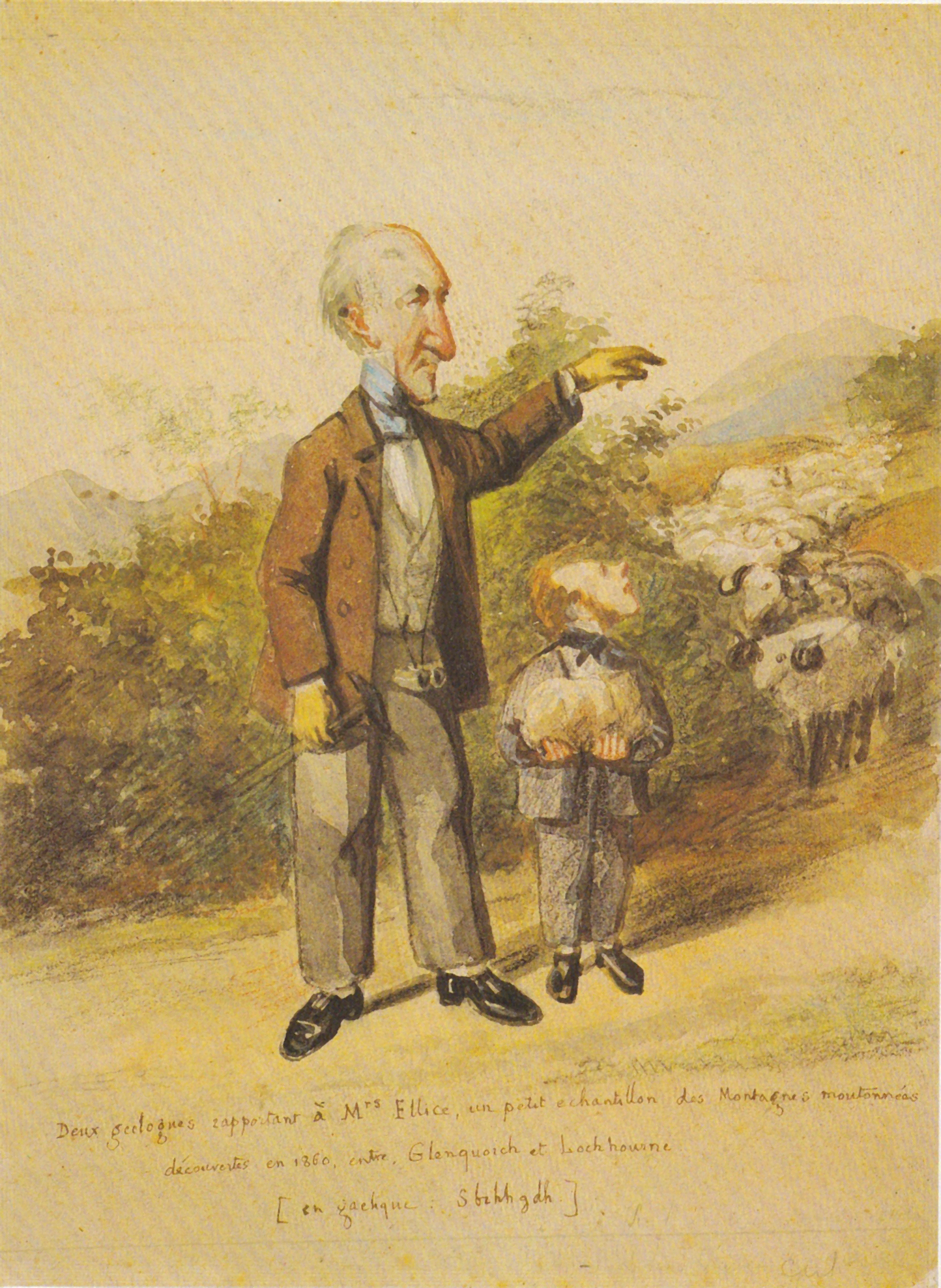
Murchison and Geikie geologising in the Scottish Highlands, Prosper Mérimée, 1860

In 1860 Nicol returned to the Northwest Highlands to investigate further and Murchison, after hearing of Nicol's travels, made a quite separate journey taking along with him a junior but very ambitious member of the Survey, Archibald Geikie. Murchison confirmed in his own mind what he had already observed and Geikie, anxious to please, became a strong supporter of Murchison's views. However, in his posthumous biography of Murchison he was to say of the expedition that Murchison "stuck to his leading principle, from which no amount of contradictory detail would make him swerve".

When Nicol announced the results of his latest investigations to the Geological Society in December 1860 he refuted Murchison's findings and rejected the presence of Silurian sediments. He considered igneous rock was to be found along a "zone of complication" from Durness to Skye and faulting was responsible for the perplexing strata. He utterly rejected Murchison's idea that metamorphic rock could lie with no unconformity (with no intervening period of erosion) over unaltered sedimentary layers. There was no evidence that the highlands were of Silurian age. Murchison was enraged and wrote to his protegé Archibald Geikie "we have a fight in which our reputation and veracity are at stake". In February 1861 he and Geikie delivered their paper to the Geological Society and this and Nicol's papers were published in the same volume of the Quarterly Journal of the Geological Society.

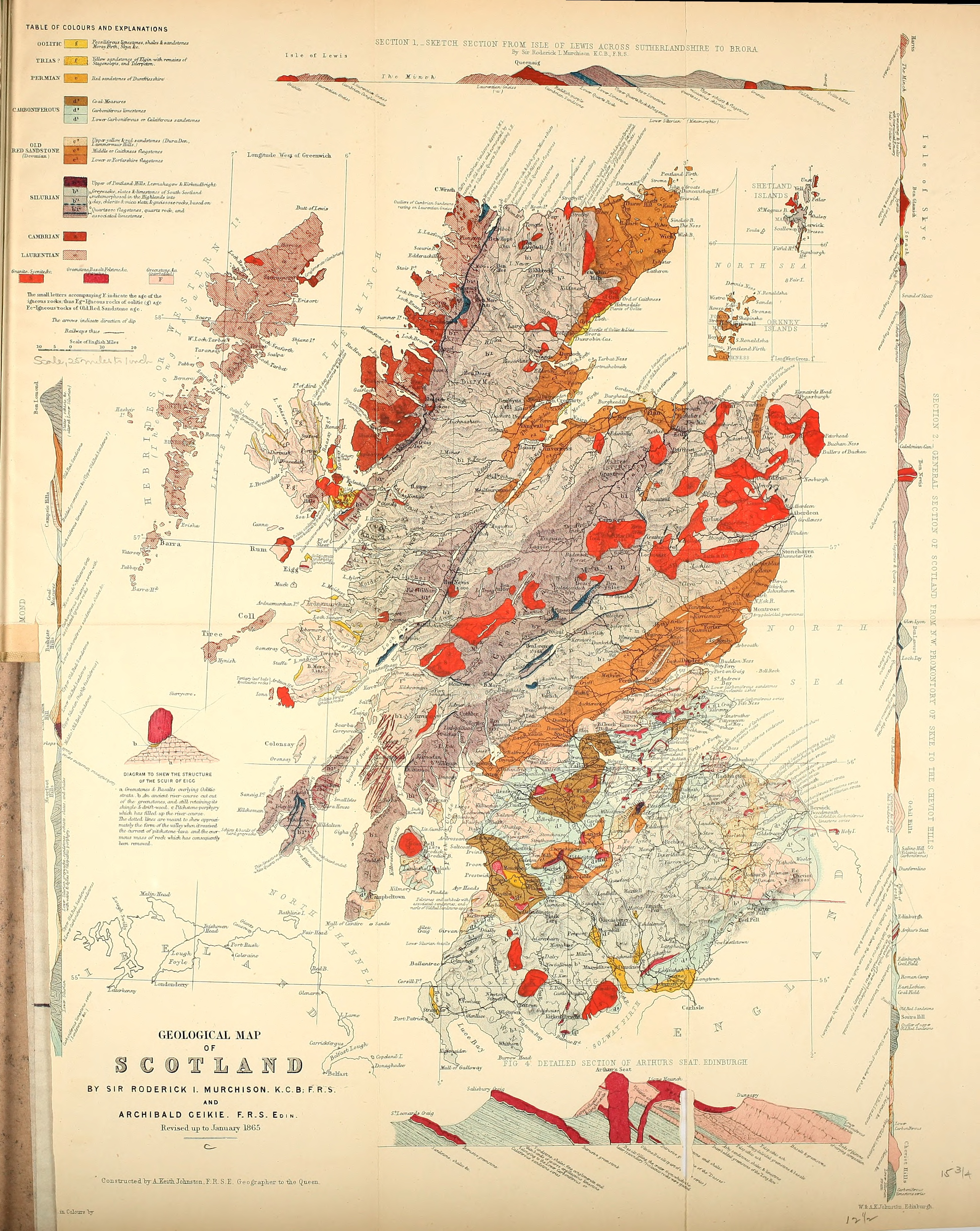
Murchison's 1865 revision of his 1861 map showing a very extensive Silurian area

At that time the geological community in Britain had not formed a definite opinion on these matters but Murchison's view was the one that was to prevail at least for a time. Murchison held great prestige and Geikie was a persuasive writer and speaker who was well able to place the best possible gloss on Murchison's views, sometimes by writing favourable anonymous reviews of the two geologists' own publications. For example, Geike wrote a seemingly independent review of his and Murchison's 1861 map. So, the Murchison–Geikie view became orthodox.

Nicol and Murchison never resolved their differences and Nicol, after making little progress persuading the geological community of his theory, ceased publishing on the matter after 1866 although he continued to make geological field studies in the north of Scotland throughout his career. He died in 1879.

Geikie was appointed director of the Scottish Geological Survey in 1867 and, in 1871, the year of Murchison's death, he was appointed to the newly created chair of Murchison professor of geology at Edinburgh University, endowed by Murchison himself. He continued to promulgate Murchison's Silurian theories and carried the professional geological establishment with him.

== Rising dissent in the 1880s ==
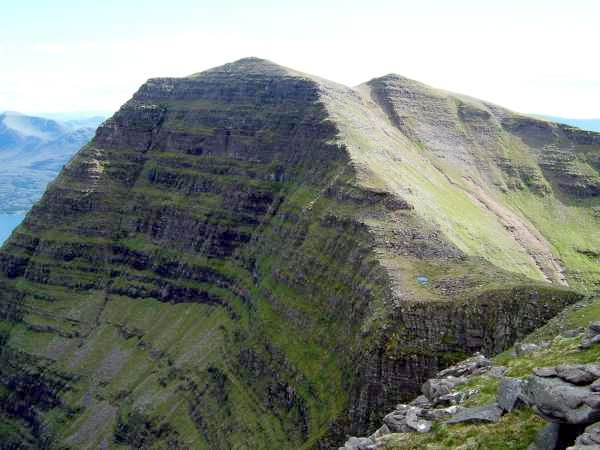
Horizontal strata of Torridonian sandstone on Beinn Alligin

At this time the Geological Society's members were academic geologists and amateurs, some of them becoming very knowledgeable and well respected. There were often differences of approach and opinion between, on the one hand, members of the Society and, on the other, senior spokesmen and managers of the "professionals" employed in the Geological Survey who carried out most of the actual fieldwork. The Survey's directors considered themselves better informed than amateurs and academics (who they regarded also as amateurs). From around 1878 papers by members of the Society started to appear, sometimes supporting Nicol and at other times just drawing attention to the inconsistencies in both contemporary theories and the incompatibility of the various field observations.

Murchison retired as director-general in 1867 to be succeeded by Andrew Ramsay. In 1880 an anonymous letter to The Times was highly critical of the state-funded Survey remarking that it had been set up to be, and should be, a temporary organisation, that it was prolonging its own existence and that the surveyors, rather than being peripatetic, were settling down in particular regions, hence exacerbating the problem. The matter was debated in both Commons and Lords leading to inquiries by the Science and Art Department. Ramsay, by now in poor health, was not well able to defend his organisation – he had suggested it would take 22 years to complete the Scottish survey. (Note: Ramsay estimated 2 1/2 years for England and Wales and 7 1/2 years for Ireland to complete the surveys.) This led to his retirement in 1882 and a reduction in the staff and scope of the Survey's work.

Geikie made further field trips in 1880 and 1881 and, although he noted several, or many, anomalies, he stuck with the Murchison paradigm of Silurian simplicity. In 1882 Wilfred Hudleston wrote of a ubiquitous but unidentified type of rock, which was then being called "Logan rock" and is now known to be Lewisian gneiss, saying "this monster will, in most places, have to be dealt with on the basis of a fold over of some of the lower beds". From about 1880 the first Ordnance Survey maps of northwest Scotland started to be published and these eased the work of the geologists. A few six-inch-maps came first, followed shortly by a one-inch series with contour lines.

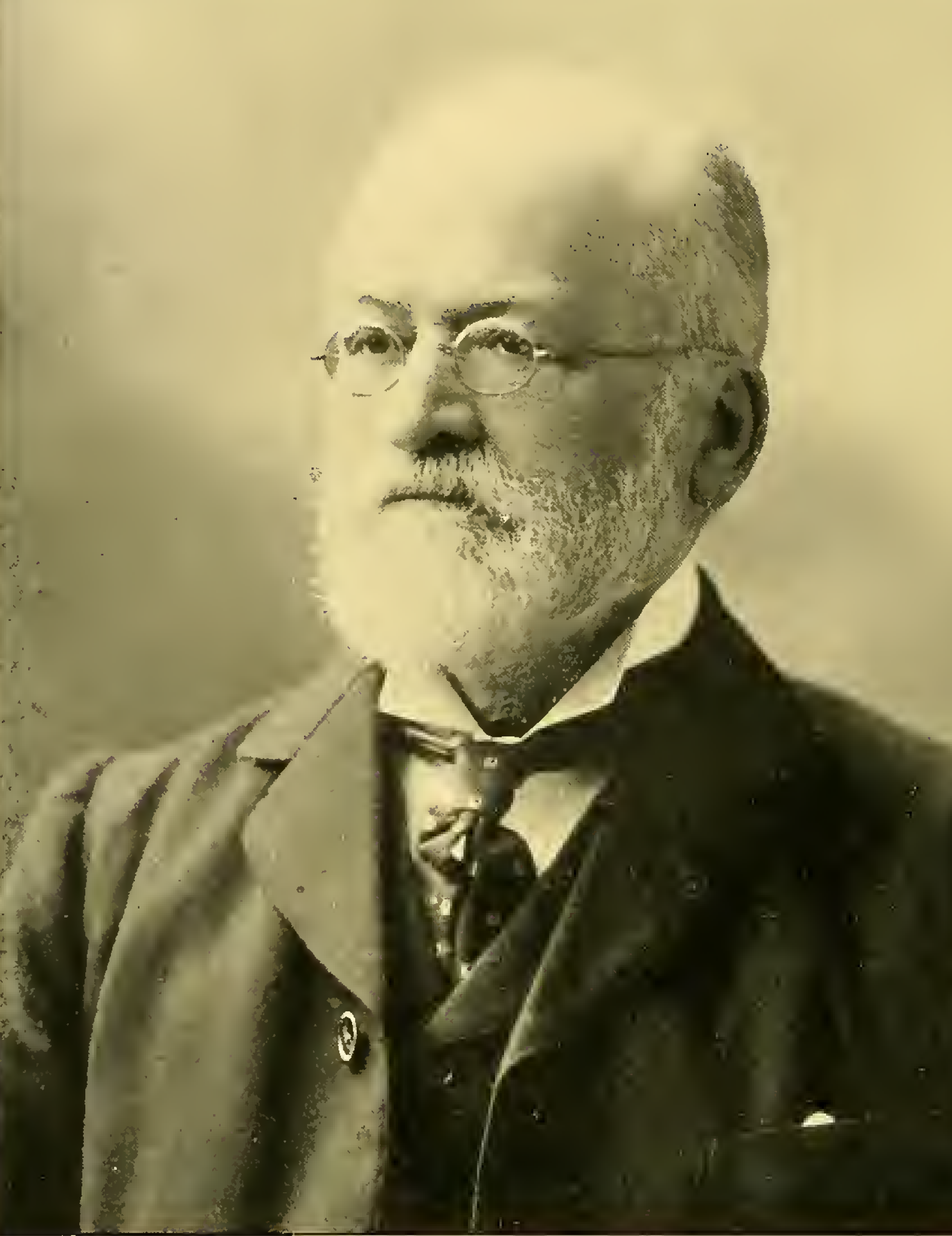
Charles Callaway

In 1881 an amateur geologist Charles Callaway surveyed in detail the Durness and Inchnadamph regions and presented a paper to the Geological Society saying the overlying gneiss could not have been formed more recently than the unmetamorphosed limestone below it. His paper generated considerable interest but little agreement except to say that the geological structure of the region was not currently understood. Not deterred by a Geological Survey letter to Nature assuring that Murchison's interpretation would "never be invalidated", the following year Callaway ventured north again equipping him in 1883 to write, according to Oldroyd, "one of the most important documents pertaining to the Highlands controversy". Indeed, in 1882 there was almost a score of geologists busy in the Highlands, knowing something was there to be discovered but not knowing what it was.

Callaway now proposed a particular stratigraphic sequence of rocks (in order of the time they were originally deposited) and compared this with the sequence of strata he observed in vertical sections taken along lines at different locations and in different directions. He found that he could generally work out that some sequences were the right way up and that others were inverted. Where a particular type of rock had seemed to be at more than one position in the stratigraphic column it now appeared it was one layer folded over on itself. For Loch Eriboll Callaway claimed that over-hastiness had led earlier geologists to misread the geological situation. Only Nicol had seen the real structure and, Callaway said, he was pleased "however humbly, to vindicate his reputation". At the meeting where Callaway presented his paper it was well received and no one from the Geological Survey rose to make any objections.

Underlying the debate about geological thrusts and faults at this time was a developing world view of the earth's geology. It was theorised that, because the earth was cooling, it was shrinking and, therefore, wrinkling and this was the cause of mountain building. Faults formed at areas of weakness as the land collapsed into the shrinking interior. In particular, faults developed beside the rigid Lewisian gneiss at the coastal region of northwest Scotland.

== Lapworth's discoveries ==
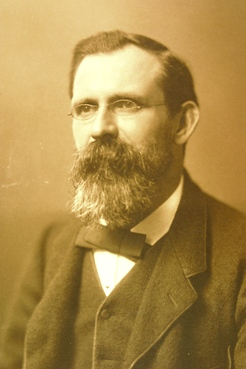
Lapworth, about 1880

=== Southern Uplands ===
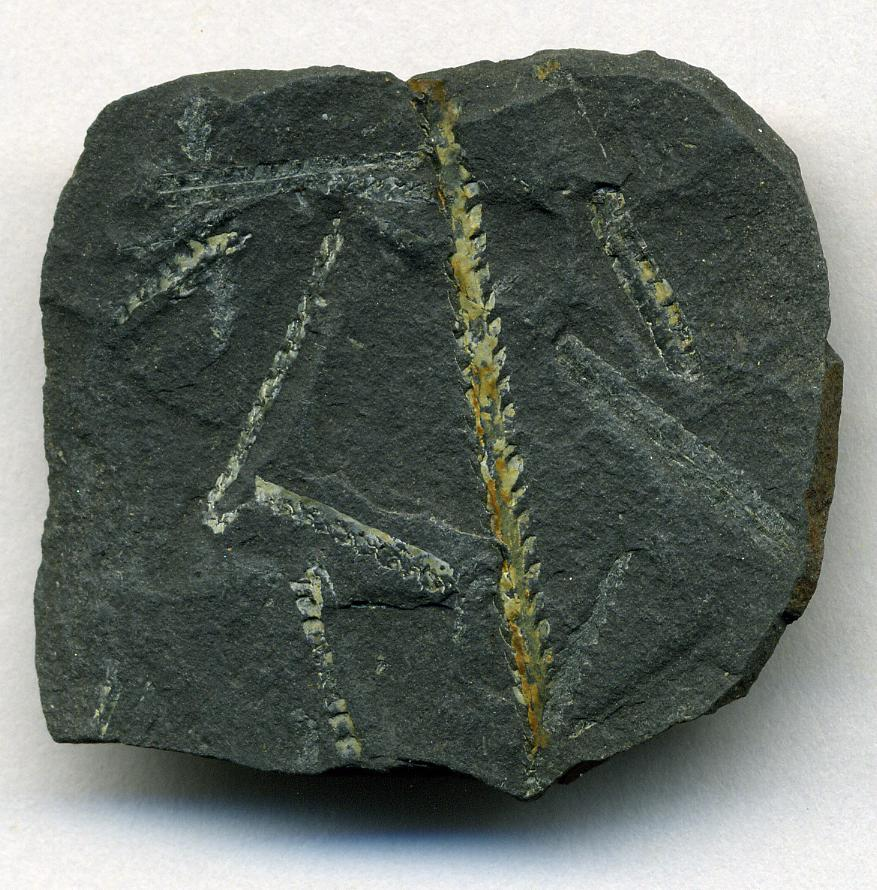
Graptolite fossils from Dob's Linn

From about 1869, Charles Lapworth, then a schoolteacher, had been quietly surveying the geology of the Southern Uplands of Scotland as a hobby. There are few fossils except in some dark shale bands which are packed with the fossils of graptolites. Previously geologists, if they considered graptolites at all, had considered them as an unreliable indicator of age whereas Lapworth identified different species at different levels. Because these free-floating creatures had turned to fossils in sedimentation on the sea bed this gave a good indication of the era in which each species had lived and died, regardless of the prior geological stratification of the ground on which they were deposited. Between about 1872 and 1877 Lapworth studied the locality known as Dob's Linn where an anticline makes it likely the five layers of dark shale have not been inverted in the immediate vicinity so, knowing the order of ages of rock, he could work out the order of ages of the different species.

By applying this knowledge over the Southern Uplands as a whole he could tell that, after the fossils had been laid down, the land had often been severely folded sometimes to the extent of being overturned with a single geological layer being duplicated. This showed that the Geological Survey's maps of the area were in error in showing the rock to be Silurian and so the Survey was forced to map the area all over again using Lapworth's detailed techniques. In 1872 Lapworth had been elected as a fellow of the Geological Society – he went on to become a world authority on graptolites and was appointed professor of geology and metallurgy in 1881.

=== Northwest Highlands ===
The Silurian theory received another setback when Lapworth examined the Northwest Highlands in 1882 and 1883. In 1882 Lapworth had made an inch by inch inspection and discovered that the "upper" and "lower" quartz layers were in reality part of a single layer folded over on itself and by the following year he was able to demonstrate this convincingly to colleagues. At Durness and Eriboll where the layers of rock were most pronounced he could not find fossils sufficiently indicative for his purposes so he had to turn to lithostratigraphy rather than continue with the biostratigraphy he had used so successfully in the Southern Highlands. Detailed examination of the lithological characteristics enabled him to build up a finely divided geological sequence and place it in the correct stratigraphical order. At Eriboll he recognised that it was foliation that could be observed, not sedimentary bedding planes, and the foliation was the result of large lateral forces from the southeast forcing older rocks to slide over younger ones. What Murchison had identified as bedding planes – adjacent layers of different types and ages of rock – were actually thrust planes – dislocations in a layer caused by sideways thrusting having occurred.

"For many years the Highland controversy has appeared to outsiders, and to those geologists who were unaware of the difficulties attending the stratigraphy of the older rocks, as a trivial dispute between the Geological Survey on the one hand and a few misguided amateurs on the other."

— Charles Lapworth, "On the Close of the Highland Controversy", Geological Magazine (1885)

== Peach and Horne ==
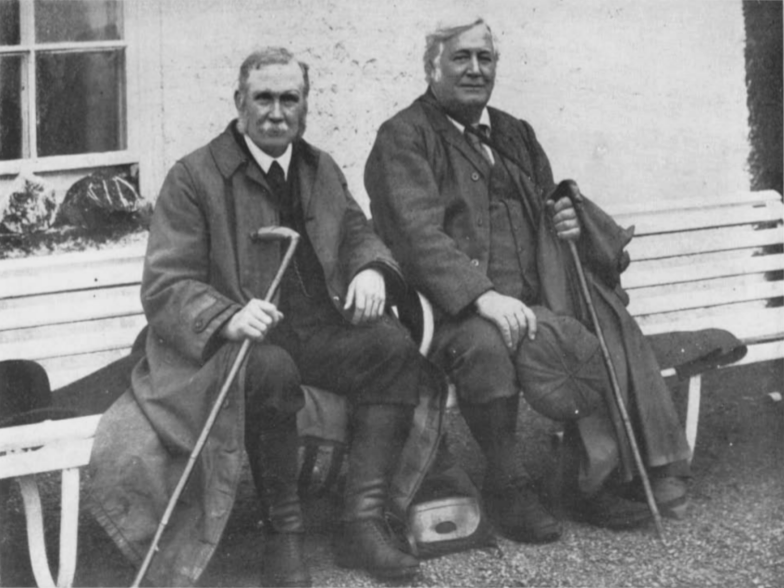
Horne (left) and Peach, 1912

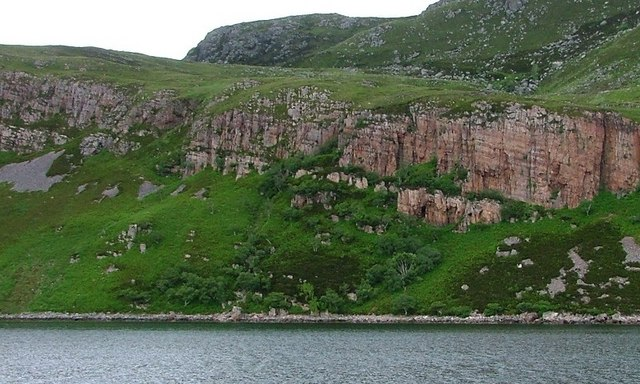
Glencoul Thrust – Cambrian rock sandwiched between layers of older Lewisian

Geikie, who had been appointed director-general of the Geological Survey in 1882, arranged for his colleagues Ben Peach and John Horne to make a detailed survey of the Northwest Highlands starting in 1883 with the intention of confirming Murchison's hypothesis. After only one season they were able to report that Lapworth had again been correct at least in the northern Durness-Eriboll region although Geikie still saw the evidence as favouring Murchison. However, by the following year, after a more southerly survey, Geikie became convinced when he was shown Torridonian sandstone metamorphosed to schist and he wrote in support of the new theory in his preface to Peach and Horne's 1884 report where he made first use of the term "thrust plane".

There had been no great differences of opinion between the officers of the Geological Survey out in the field and the amateur and academic geologists likewise engaged. Rather it was the successive directors of the Survey, Murchison, Ramsay and Geikie, who had been unwilling to accept that the official position was unsatisfactory. By 1884, with the stratigraphy less contentious, Geikie extended the remit of the survey to include the petrology of the metamorphic rocks – what they had been made from in the first place. Recognising that his organisation was not strong in petrology or petrography compared with the work elsewhere in Europe, particularly Germany, in 1884 Geikie started approaching Jethro Teall to join the Survey and at last persuaded him in 1888, the year Teall's book British Petrography was published. (Note: In 1883 Thomas George Bonney had very publicly criticised the lack of knowledge of petrology shown by Geikie personally and by the Survey of which he had so recently become director-general.) By the time of Peach and Horne's 1888 paper they were able to extend their analysis of the complex stratigraphy to many more locations along the fault and by 1891 all ideas of Silurian rocks in northwest Scotland had been abandoned. So, confirming Lapworth's view, what Murchison had considered to be Silurian was now identified on the basis of the Durness fossils to be Cambrian and the Torridonian sandstone was placed in the later stages of the Precambrian. A series of geological maps was produced in this period at scales of one inch and six inches to the mile. (Note: For example Peach and Horne's survey of Durness and Eriboll, published 1889, is on map 114 and a 1923 composite of the 1892 maps of Assynt was published in 1923. The Assynt map was reprinted in 1947 and, with minor emendations, in 1965. Since that time it has been fully revised.)

== Wharton Committee ==
In a series of articles on "scientific worthies", in December 1892 Nature published an adulatory article about Geikie, written by his close friend and eminent French geologist Albert Auguste de Lapparent. Dealing with the Highlands Controversy, it said that Murchison's theory had never "quite satisfied" Geikie who, for his "love of truth", had delegated to Peach and Horne the task of making a new survey of the region without any preconceptions. No mention was made of any involvement by geologists outside the Geological Survey. (Note: Geikie responded to this, in part, "I was finally convinced that they were untenable by the brilliant mapping of my colleagues, Messrs. Peach and Horne, who, following Prof. Lapworth's lead, share with him in the glory of one of the greatest achievements of field geology in recent times.".) Soon after this an editorial article appeared in the Daily Chronicle condemning the state-funded system in England that allowed eminent establishment scientists to "blunder with impunity". (Note: The editorial named Huxley, Hooker and Geikie.) The article continued that Murchison's "absurd theory" had been strongly supported by Geikie who had then instituted a second survey of the whole region, both carried out at the taxpayers' expense. Letter writing extended onto The Times and broadened to discuss the whole British scientific establishment, particularly the Royal Society, with suggestions of corruption.

Geologists regarded the work in northwest Scotland as being of considerable scientific importance but the Scottish work (which held little commercial significance) lagged far behind that in England, Wales and Ireland. Politicians, under pressure from both commercial and tax-saving lobbies, started questioning the work of the Geological Survey and there was a proposal to transfer it from the Department of Science and Art to the Ordnance Survey. In 1900 a committee under John Wharton started to inquire into these matters. The committee found in favour of the Survey's continuance, recommended improved staff pay and working conditions, and a transfer to the Board of Education. There was no explicit criticism of Geikie but the committee's report was likely to have led to his retirement the next year. Horne was interviewed by the committee and was promoted to become deputy director to Teall, taking responsibility for Scotland. Peach wrote an extremely generous letter on the occasion of Geikie's retirement which Geikie published in his 1924 autobiography.

== Geological Structure of the North-West Highlands of Scotland ==
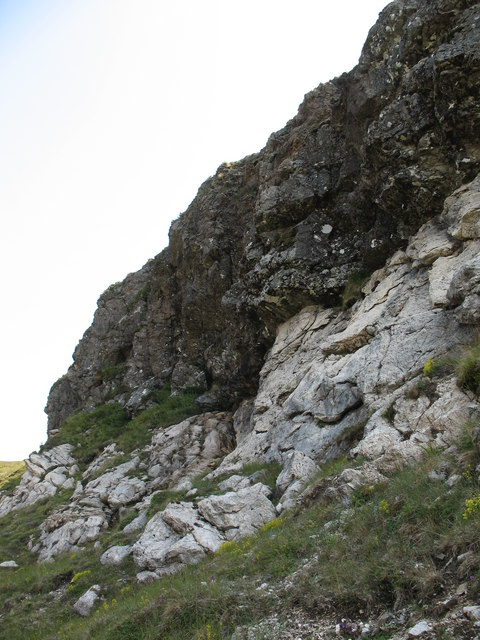
Moine Thrust at Knockan Crag

Peach and Horne continued their work and published The Geological Structure of the North-West Highlands of Scotland in 1907 with Geikie, in his retirement, making the final editing. Their research was into one of the most geologically complex regions of Britain, (Note: Britain is itself geologically complex by world standards.) and they introduced the term "Moine Thrust". (Note: Peach and Horne wrote "Ever since the time of Macculloch, at the beginning of last century, the stratigraphical position and relative age of these rocks have been a subject of animated discussion and, for a time, of keen controversy. Relying on the apparent order of superposition, the earlier observers naturally inferred from the magnificent sections laid bare along the western fjords and on the grand escarpments and dip-slopes of the mountains that the Eastern Schists follow the Cambrian strata in conformable sequence. But the geological structure which seems at first sight so simple, has proved, on later detailed examination, to be extremely complicated. The apparent succession has been found to be deceptive, and the superposition, which is undeniable, is now ascertained to be due to great terrestrial displacements, which have no parallel elsewhere in Britain.") In his preface to the memoir, Geikie refers the area of the Moine Thrust as being a place to study "some of the more stupendous kinds of movement by which the crust of the earth has been affected". (Note: Much of the theory of thrust belts derived from the work in Peach and Horne's 1888 paper.)

The introduction to the memoir, written by Horne, provides an accessible description of geological structure that had been uncovered. Horne describes four groups of rocks, dealing with them from oldest to youngest, west to east. First, along the west coast, the Lewisian complex of gneiss stretches from Cape Wrath to Loch Torridon and then out to the Hebridean islands South Rona and Raasay. The topology is low, rounded and hollowed, only occasionally forming peaks such as at Ben Stack. The rock is ancient and highly metamorphosed of igneous and occasionally sedimentary origin, with many igneous dykes and sills intruding. Before this was overlaid by Torridonian sandstone it was subject to immense stress towards west-northwest deforming the intrusions and the heat generated produced further metamorphosis. There was then a long period of erosion of what was then a land surface before the much later Torridonian sandstone sedimentation.

Secondly. the overlying Torridonian sandstones show gently inclined sedimentary strata with minor faults and joints that have eroded away to form the buttresses of high mountains. No definite fossils could be found. After a long period of marine erosion, the rock that was laid down on top, white over dark red, could be dated as Cambrian, indicating that the Torridonian sandstone was Precambrian. Where later earth movements thrust into and over the sandstone it became metamorphosed into schist.

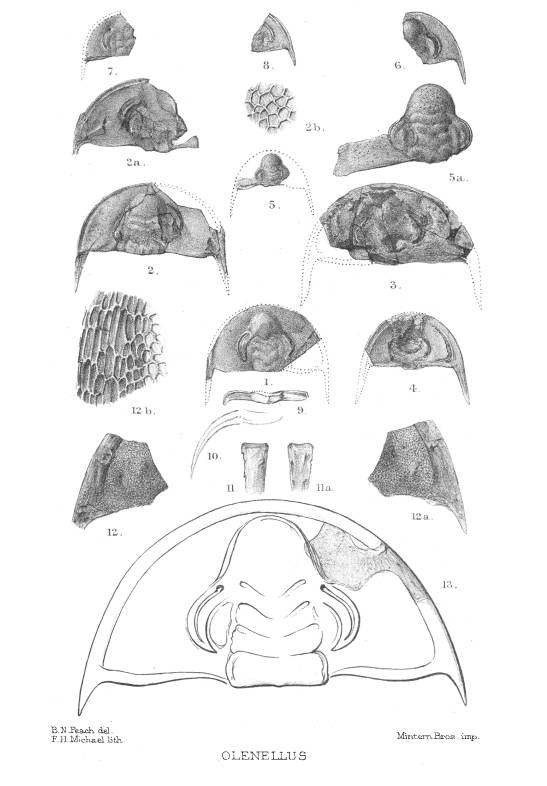
Peach and Horne's illustration of trilobite Olennus fossils from northwest Scotland

Thirdly is a series of marine sedimentary layers – quartzite, dolomite and limestone – within which was discovered Cambrian age trace trilobite fossils. Peach and Horne remarked that the fauna are "identical" to those in the corresponding geological strata in North America. (Note: Peach and Horne acknowledged Salter as having pointed out in 1859 that the Durness limestone fossils show greater similarity with those in America rather than Europe.) Occasionally the sedimentary rock rests on the basement gneiss when the Torridonian sandstone had been completely eroded away, such as just south of Loch Assynt. These layers are separated from the underlying sandstone by an unconformity during which time interval the sandstone was folded and greatly eroded away, sometimes completely. The Cambrian sediment became intersected with sills and dykes, particularly near Inchnadamph.

Fourthly, and what became the most interesting feature for the geologists, was the immense horizontal movement of rock over all these layers that occurred subsequently towards the west-northwest. (Note: The overthrusting was caused by the collision of the continents Laurentia and Baltica, generating the Caledonian orogeny.) The underlying rock became broken up into slices that became piled up (imbricated) between thrust planes that also became folded. Basement Lewisian gneiss could be thrust up to the surface and rock strata could be shifted around to the extent that they could become inverted in their sequence – for example gneiss could overlay limestone. The main thrust, the Moine Thrust, moved schist from the east towards and over the pre-existing rock on the west while the effect of shearing at the thrust itself was to metamorphose the material at the interface into a mylonite structure. In "pipe rock" the deformation had the effect of bending over fossilised vertical worm casts so they become flattened horizontally. At one time this material extended much further to the west but it, and the underlying rocks, have been eroded, so exposing the underlying rocks and their geological history.

Geological cross section at Glencoul Thrust, extracted from Peach & Horne (1923) (Note: A key to the symbols and colouring of the map is at File:Glencoul Thrust, 1923, key landscape.png. The entire map is available online.)

The work has been described as "one of the most notable geological memoirs ever published in the English language". According to Butler, the memoir has provided a "startling synthesis" describing, for the first time, the folds within imbricate slices and thrust sheets and the thrusts that delimit them. So definitive was the work that it was not until 1980 that the structural evolution of the region again started being reinvestigated including with deep seismic profiling techniques. Imbricate faulting was proposed to explain the asymmetrical pattern of the stratigraphy that could not be explained by folding. The 1907 memoir and its accompanying 1-inch (1:63360) geological maps have been inspiring to geologists and have given what was arguably the start of thrust belt research worldwide and showed the importance of field mapping for tectonic research.

== Afterwards ==
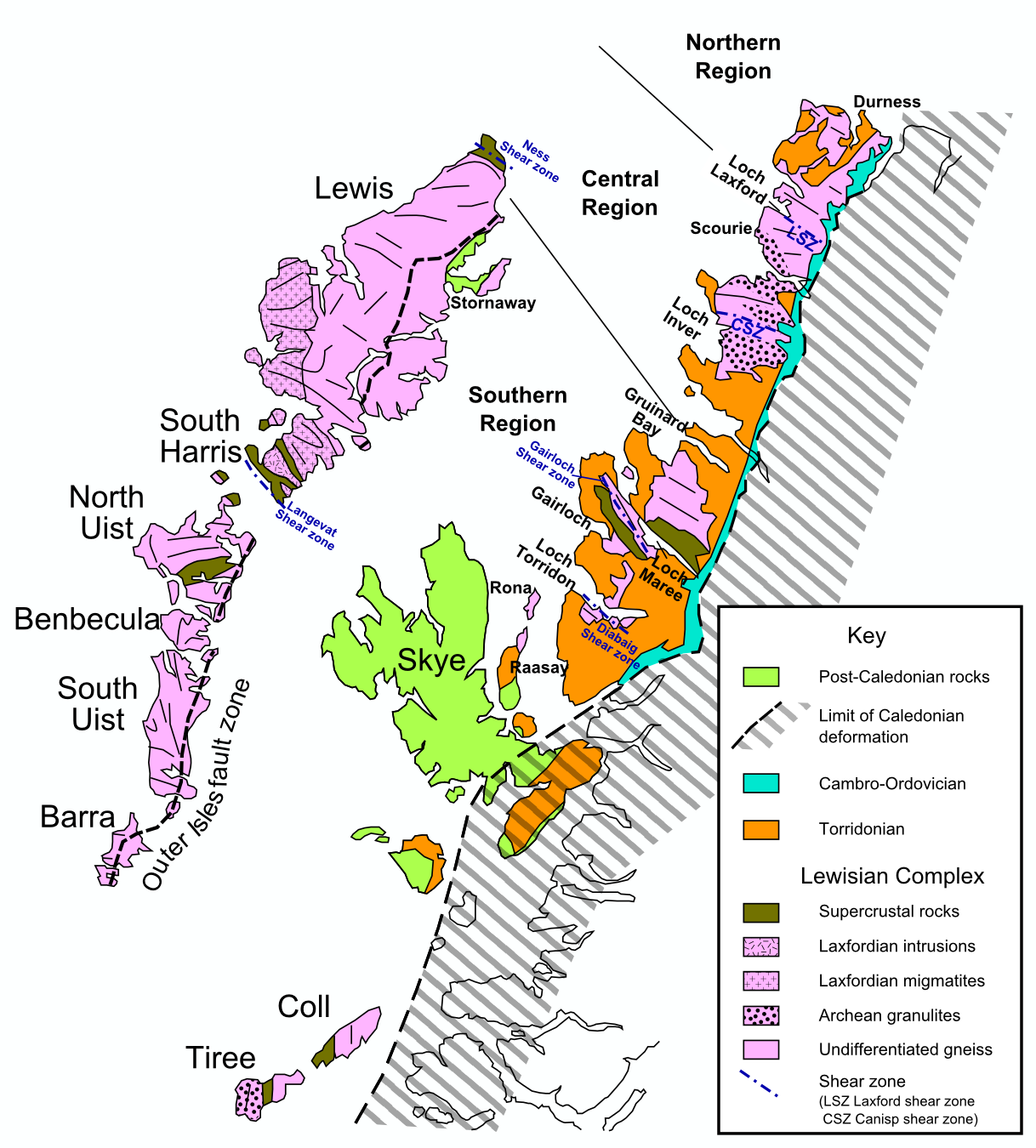
Hebridean terrane

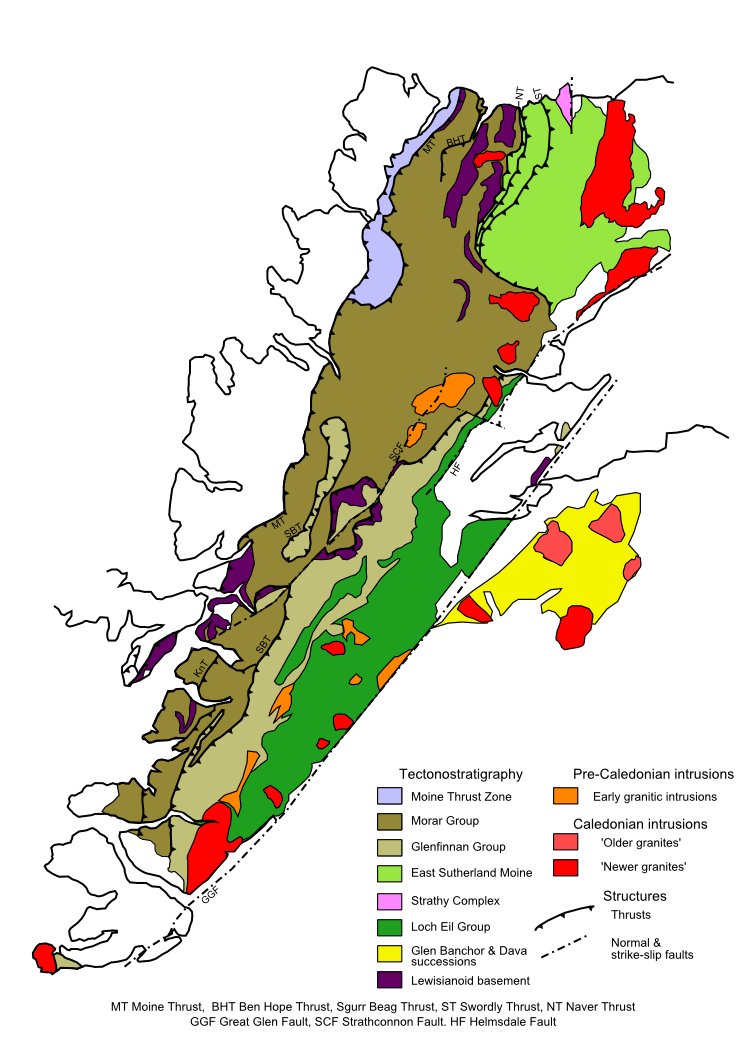
Moine Supergroup and Moine Thrust Belt

The region of the Moine Thrust is now known to be where part of the Iapetus Ocean closed with the collision of the continents of Laurentia and Baltica about 400 million years ago. The consequent Caledonian Orogeny produced intense folding and rocks of what is now called the Moine Supergroup were thrust a distance of some 100 km (60 miles) over the strata at the northwest coast. (Note: What Murchison had called the Eastern schists or Moine schists (or gneiss because at first schist and gneiss were not clearly distinguished) was later termed the Moine Supergroup.) There is a particularly good exposure of the strata at Knockan Crag, now the site of the Knockan Crag National Nature Reserve, within the North West Highlands Geopark.

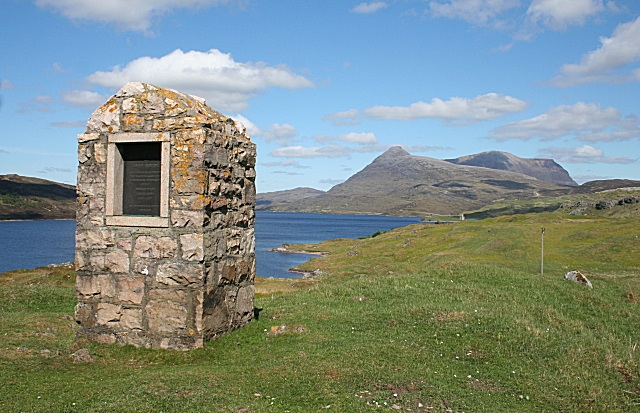
Peach and Horne memorial, 1930

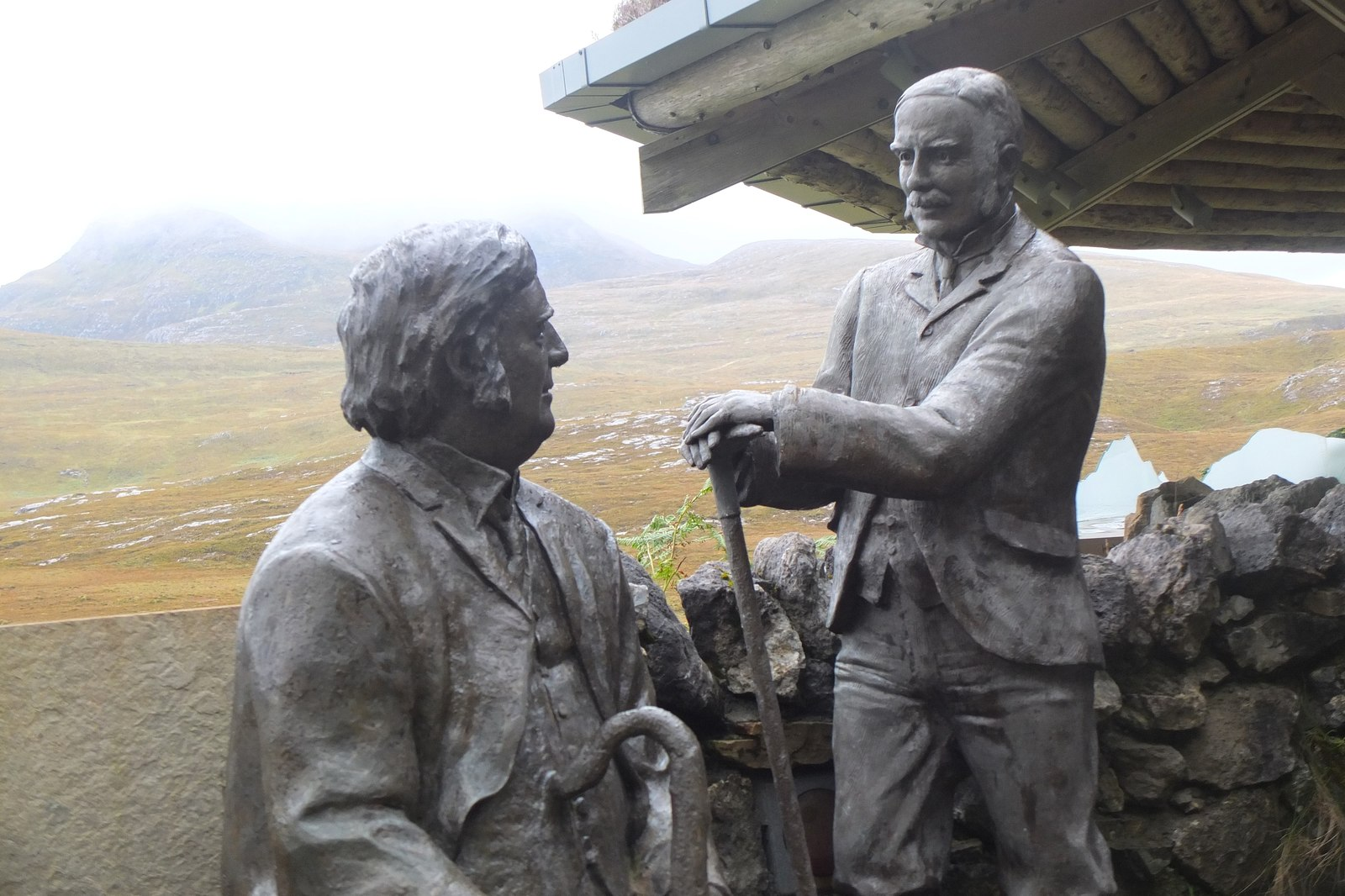
Peach and Horne statue, 2001

On the centenary of the publication of The Geological Structure, the Geological Society published an article by Rob Butler discussing the book's continuing significance. Butler says the memoir was considered to be "an instant classic" and a "masterpiece of regional geoscience" leading to generations of geology students visiting the area, now marked by a memorial, to learn about "the golden years of NW Highland geology". (Note: In his monumental work of 1909, The Face of the Eart, Eduard Suess wrote "the Geological Survey has issued such a masterly report by Peach and Horne and their colleagues that it may almost be said to make the mountains transparent".) Much of the discussion of the geology of the Lewisian complex in the memoir is now taken for granted and it correctly identified the deformation of the intruding dykes and sills and the association between deformation and metamorphism.

As well as the 1930 memorial at Inchnadamph, a statue of the two geologists was erected at Knockan Crag in 2001.

== See also ==
- The Great Devonian Controversy
