= Charles Callaway =

English geologist (1838–1915)

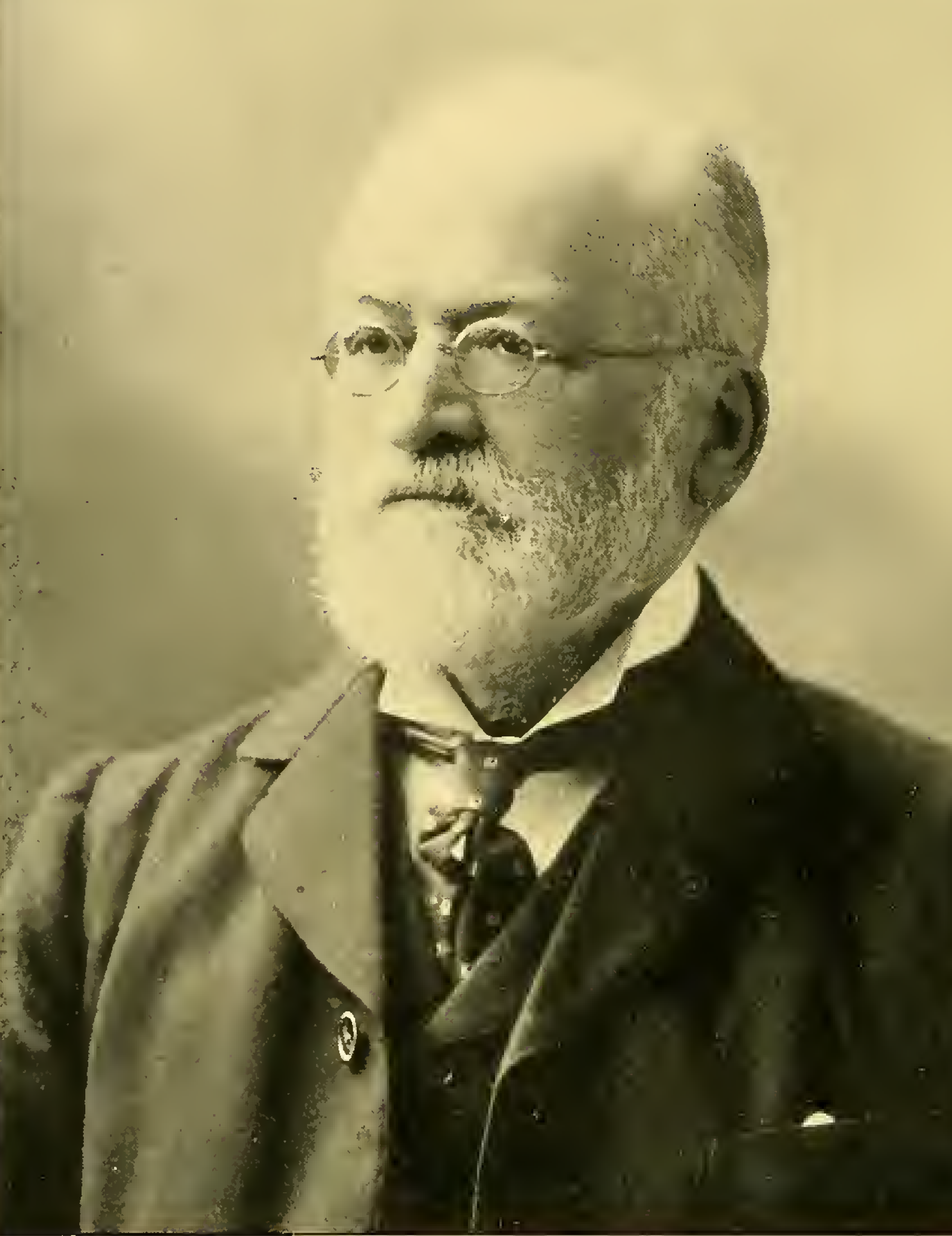
- Born: 1838; Bristol
- Died: 29 September 1915; Cheltenham
- Occupation: Geologist
- Years active: 1876 – 1898

Charles Callaway (1838 – 29 September 1915) was an English geologist.

== Early life ==
Callaway was born in Bristol in 1838 to Lemuel Callaway, an accountant, and Jane Williams, his wife. Intending to become a congregational minister, from 1859 he attended the theological college Cheshunt College, near London. From 1865 to 1868 he was a minister in the nonconformist church at Kirkby Stephen, Westmorland and then at Wellington, Shropshire from 1869 to 1871. During this time he also studied for a number of London University degrees – philosophy, philosophy and political economy, and eventually taking a first-class degree in geology in 1872.

From 1871 he took jobs at the Bradford Philosophical Society as librarian and museum curator, New York State Museum, Albany at James Hall's invitation (1873–1874) and Sheffield Public Museum until 1876. Returning to Wellington he married Hannah Maria Clark in 1876 who was music teacher at Hiatt's Ladies' College. Part-time at the college he taught English, history, and science which left time for him to pursue his research interests in paleontology and geology.

== Geological interests ==
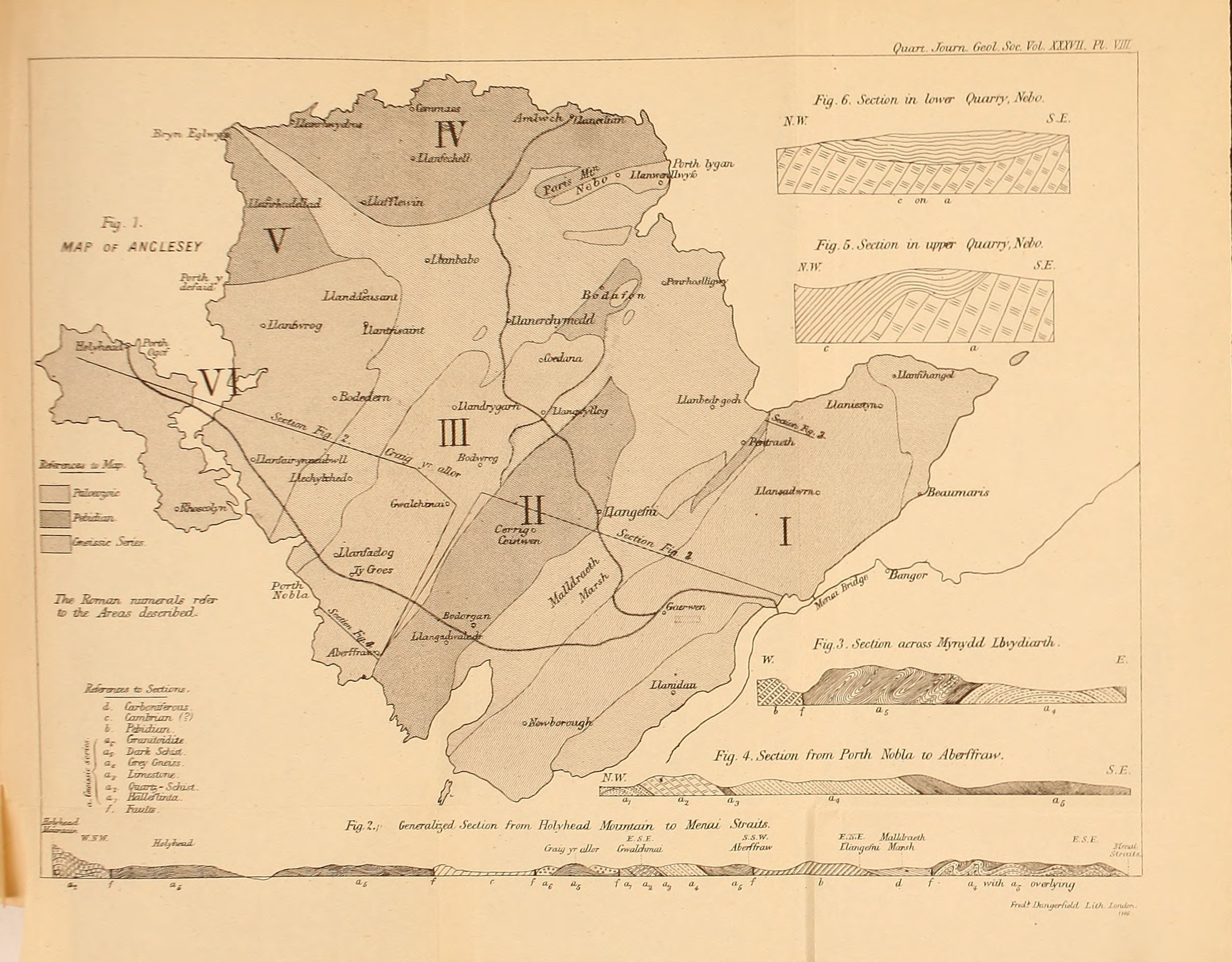
Callaway's 1881 geological map of Anglesey

In 1878 he was one of the first people in Britain to be awarded a D.Sc in geology and physical geography. He studied the geology of the Shropshire area and, later, that of Anglesey, and played a major part in showing the existence of Precambrian rocks in those places. Wondering whether the Northwest Highlands of Scotland might be Precambrian he visited in 1880 and presented a paper to the Geological Society in which he rejected Roderick Murchison's theory that gneiss was overlying limestone without an intervening unconformity. He considered that the limestone had been deposited over the gneiss which had then been raised to the surface by faulting. He thought the variability and complexity of the highland rock structures made it impossible to accept a theory that there was an overall succession in time of rock strata. He went on to take a major part in the Highlands controversy, generally confirming the work of James Nicol but finding that along a thrust fault from Loch Eriboll to Ullapool Nicol's "igneous rock" was usually Lewisian gneiss, about 300 metres (980 ft) thick, thrust over Ordovician rock.

== Later life ==
He retired in 1898 and was awarded the Murchison Medal from the Geological Society of London in 1903. In retirement he founded the Cheltenham Ethical Society and became an ardent agnostic, contributing to the Agnostic Annual and serving on the editorial board of the Rationalist Press. He died in 1915 and was buried without religious ceremony.

== See also ==
- Moine Thrust Belt
