= Inchnadamph =

Coordinates: 58.15°N 4.98°W

Inchnadamph: Scottish Gaelic: Innis nan Damh
- Location within the Sutherland area
- OS grid reference: NC251216
  - Edinburgh: 166 mi (267 km)
  - London: 498 mi (801 km)
- Council area: Highland
- Lieutenancy area: Sutherland
- Country: Scotland
- Sovereign state: United Kingdom
- Post town: LAIRG
- Postcode district: IV27
- Dialling code: 01571
- Police: Scotland
- Fire: Scottish
- Ambulance: Scottish
- UK Parliament: Caithness, Sutherland and Easter Ross
- Scottish Parliament: Caithness, Sutherland and Ross constituency in the Highlands and Islandselectoral region

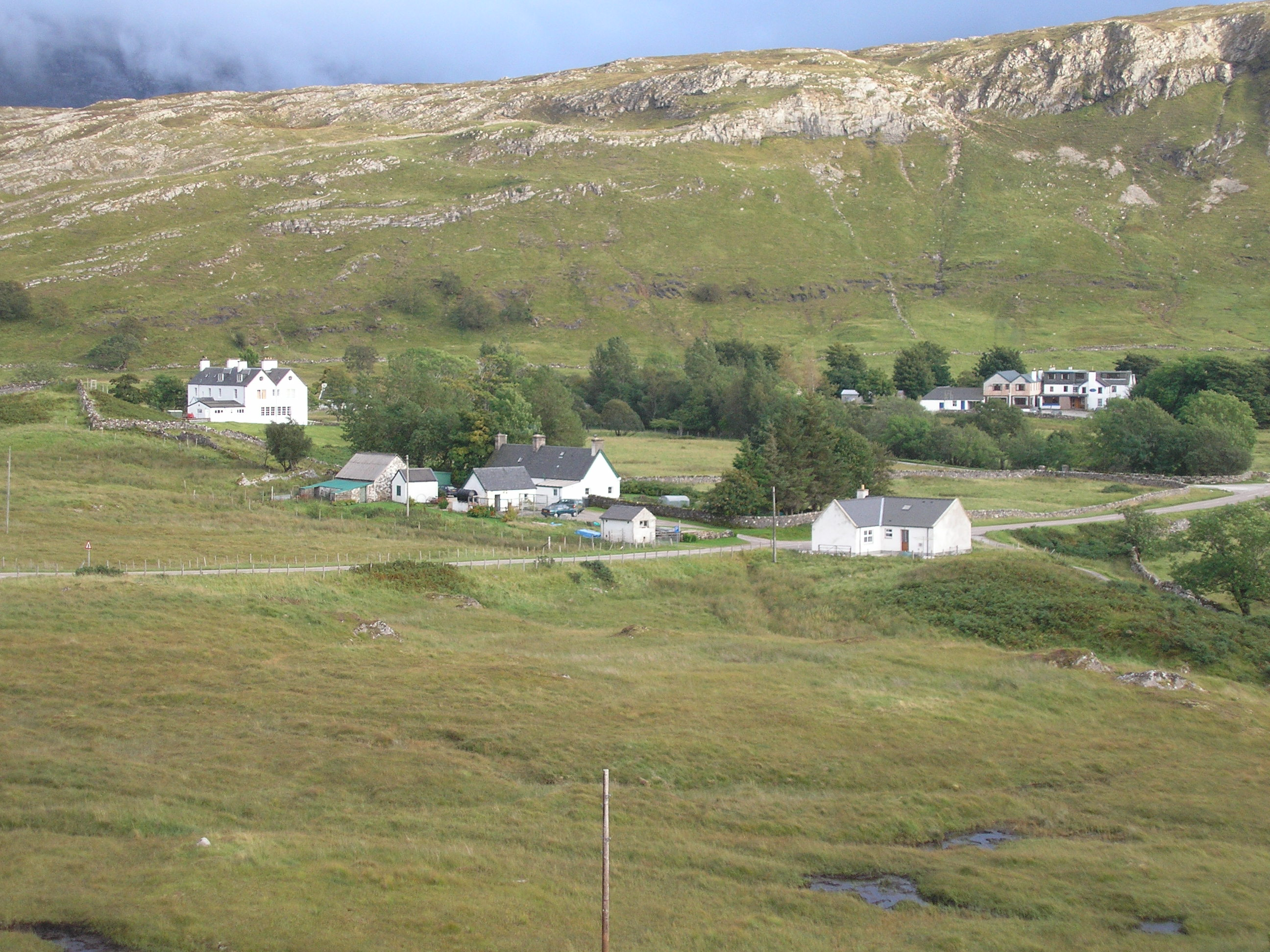
Inchnadamph with Stronchrubie Crag behind

Inchnadamph is a hamlet in Assynt, Sutherland, Scotland. The name is an anglicisation of the Gaelic name Innis nan Damh meaning "meadow of the stags". Assynt is a remote area with a low population density. Inchnadamph contains a few houses, a lodge, a hotel and a historic old church, graveyard and mausoleum.

== History ==
=== Bone Caves ===
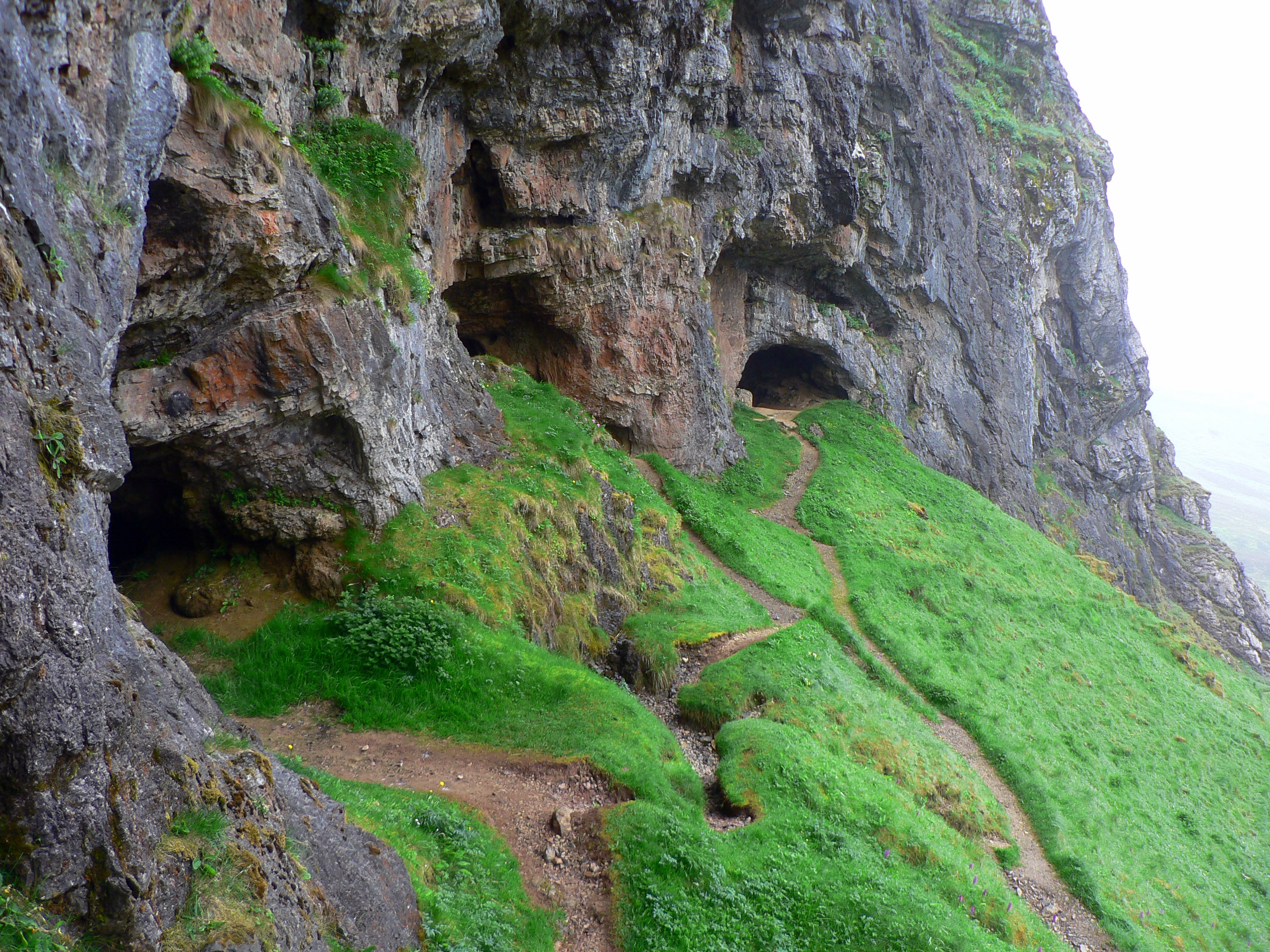
Inchnadamph Caves

The "Bone Caves" of Inchnadamph contain relics of Eurasian lynx, brown bear, Arctic fox, reindeer (dated to 47,000 BCE), the only evidence of polar bears so far found in Scotland, and human skeletons dated to the 3rd millennium BCE. The skeleton of a bear thought to be 11,000 years old or more was removed from the caves in 2008. The bones were found by cavers in 1995, deep in the Uamh an Claonaite system and have been examined by the National Museums Scotland to determine the age and species. It is presumed the animal died while hibernating, and that its body was later washed further into the underground network.

=== Ardvreck Castle ===
The ruins of Ardvreck Castle lie nearby on the shores of Loch Assynt. The castle was badly damaged in a thunderstorm in 1795. The Old Parish Church of Assynt is located in the village and pieces of an old Celtic cross have been found, dating from the 8th to the 11th century.

=== Old Parish Church ===
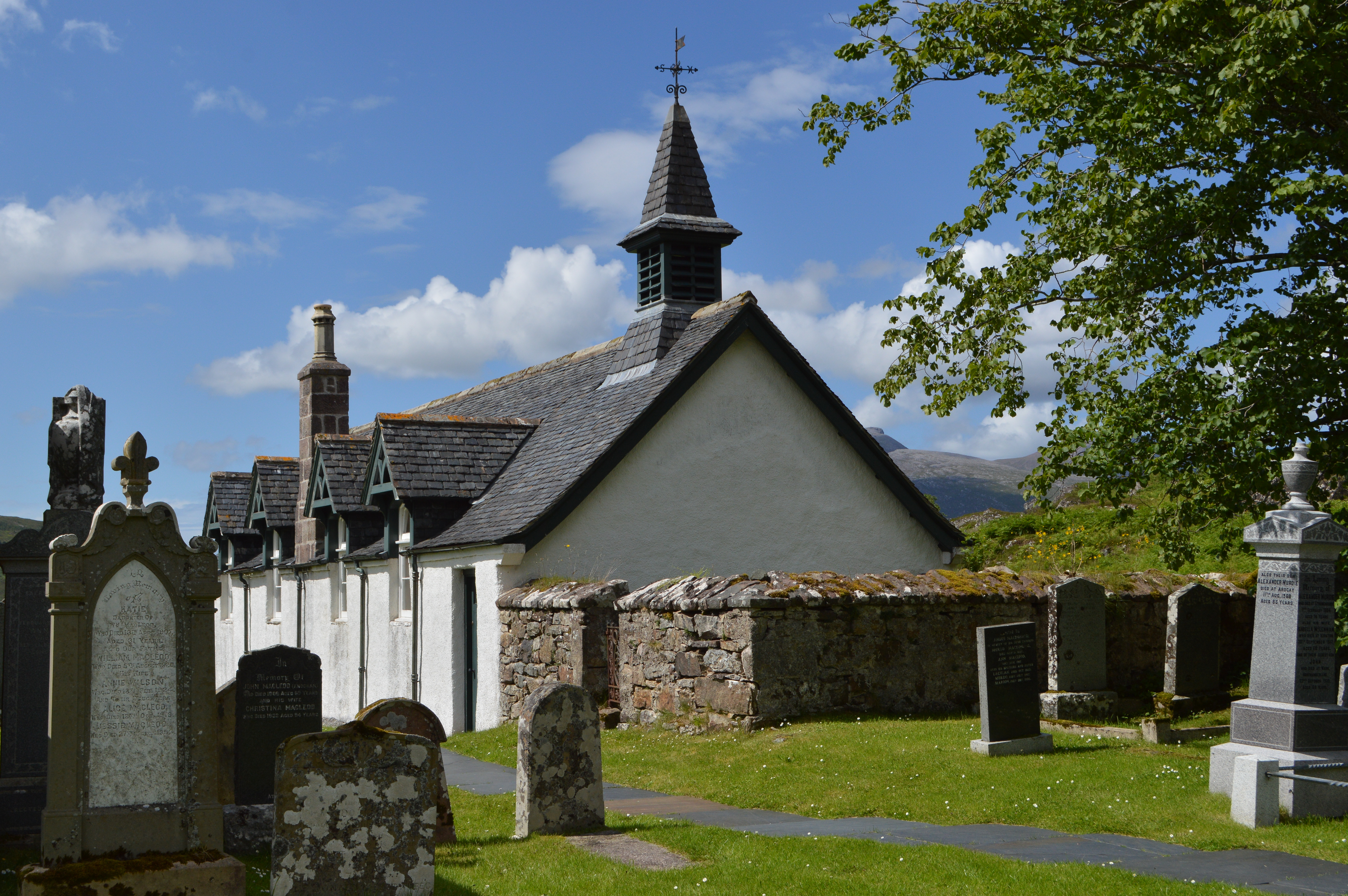
Old Parish Church, July 2014

The Old Parish Church of Assynt (Church of Scotland, Listed Building LB44967), is one of the tourist sites of Inchnadamph. Local lore ascribes the origin of the church to Angus Macleod, laird of Assynt between 1436–1443. The first official notice was in 1455. Only the burial vault of the Macleods remains of the old structure, in the graveyard to the SE of the present church. The present church was built in 1741–1743 and was renovated in 1900 by William C. Joass. It is not used for worship now. The 5-bay rectangular building measures 15m x 6m and is aligned E-W. At the east end is a spire on a square base with a cross finial. The roof is graded slate with a stone ridge, the rubble walls are pebble-dashed and whitewashed. The church and graveyard occupy an area of about 32m x 26m, protected by stone boundary walls. The interior was refurbished in 1900. The pulpit is octagonal and the pews are made of pine. The churchyard and MacLeod Vault, excluding the present church building, are a Historic Environment Scotland scheduled monument SM8309.

== Geology ==
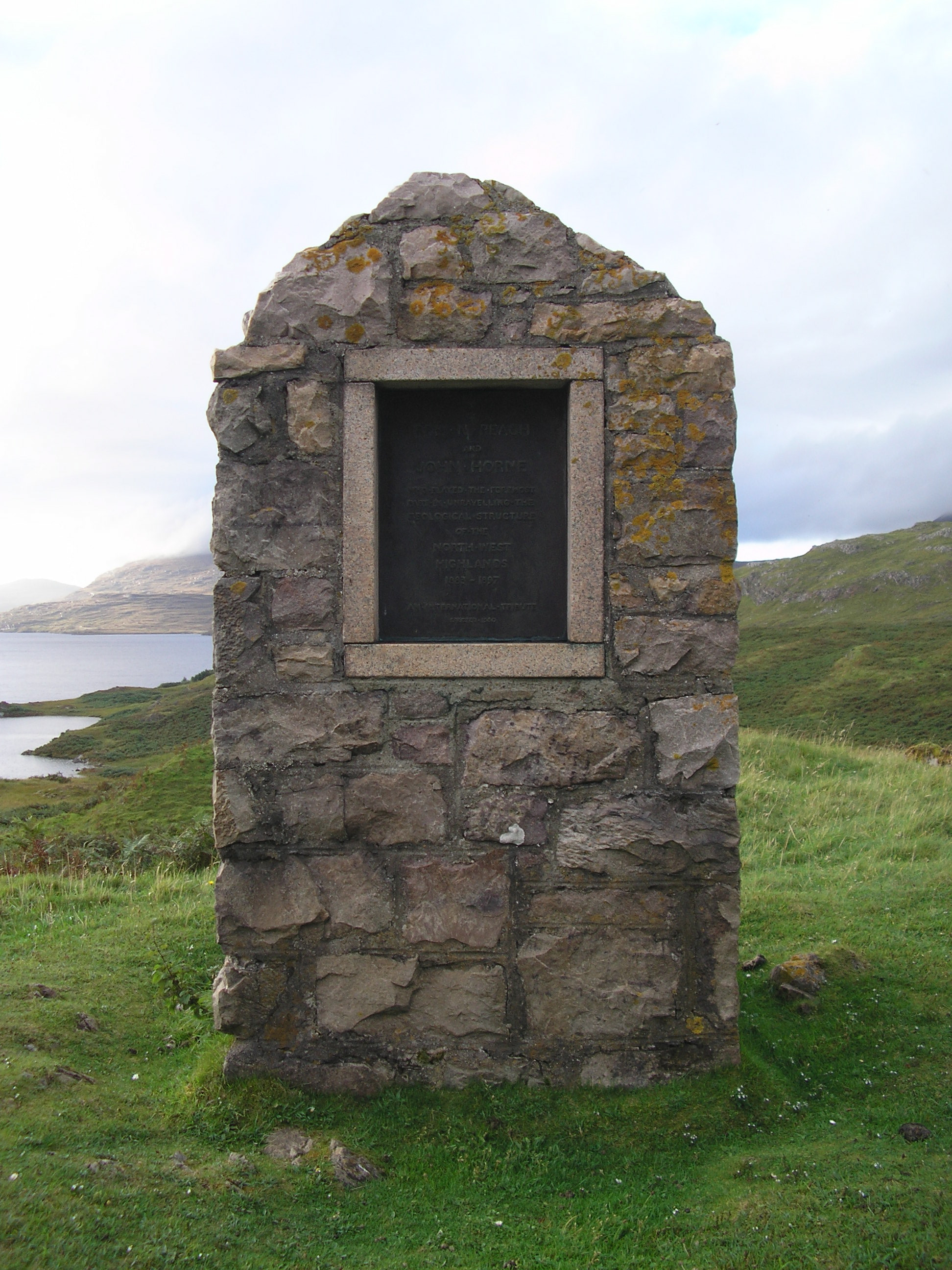
Peach and Horne monument

The Moine Thrust runs through the area, which is a mecca for geologists, who can find accommodation in the Assynt Field Centre (Inchnadamph Lodge) or at Inchnadamph Hotel. Nearby there is a monument to the work of Ben Peach and John Horne whose work, culminating in their 1907 publication The Geological Structure of the North-West Highlands of Scotland, was crucial in the understanding of this, the first thrust fault to be discovered anywhere in the world. The monument's inscription reads: "To Ben N Peach and John Horne who played the foremost part in unravelling the geological structure of the North West Highlands 1883–1897. An international tribute. Erected 1930". The hotel retains a copy of the guest book signed by many prominent geologists of the day who visited during the 1912 British Association for the Advancement of Science excursion to Assynt.

== See also ==
- Geology of Scotland
- Knockan Crag
- Ardvreck Castle
- North West Highlands Geopark
