= Knockan Crag =

Cliff in the North West Highlands Geopark, Scotland

Knockan Crag National Nature Reserve
- IUCN category III (natural monument or feature)
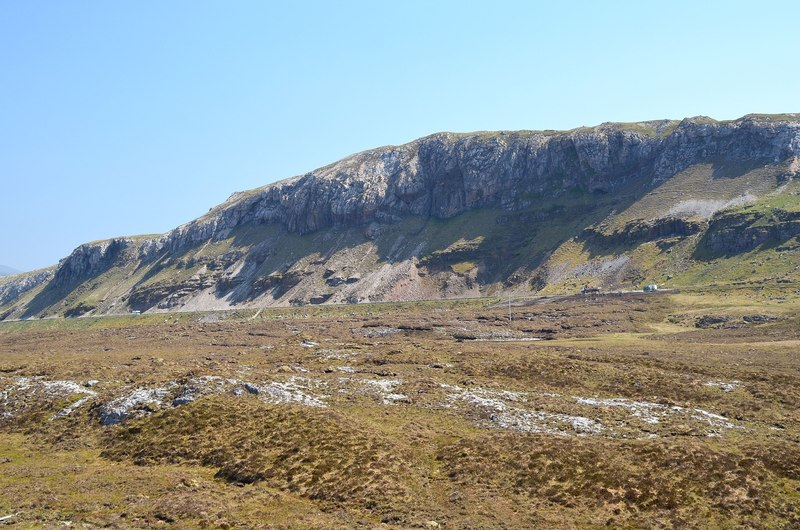
- The Moine Thrust at Knockan Crag

- Location within Highland
- Location: Highland, Scotland
- Coordinates: 58.03887°N 5.06212°W
- Area: 22.15 ha (54.7 acres)
- Established: 2004
- Governing body: NatureScot
- Website: Knockan Crag

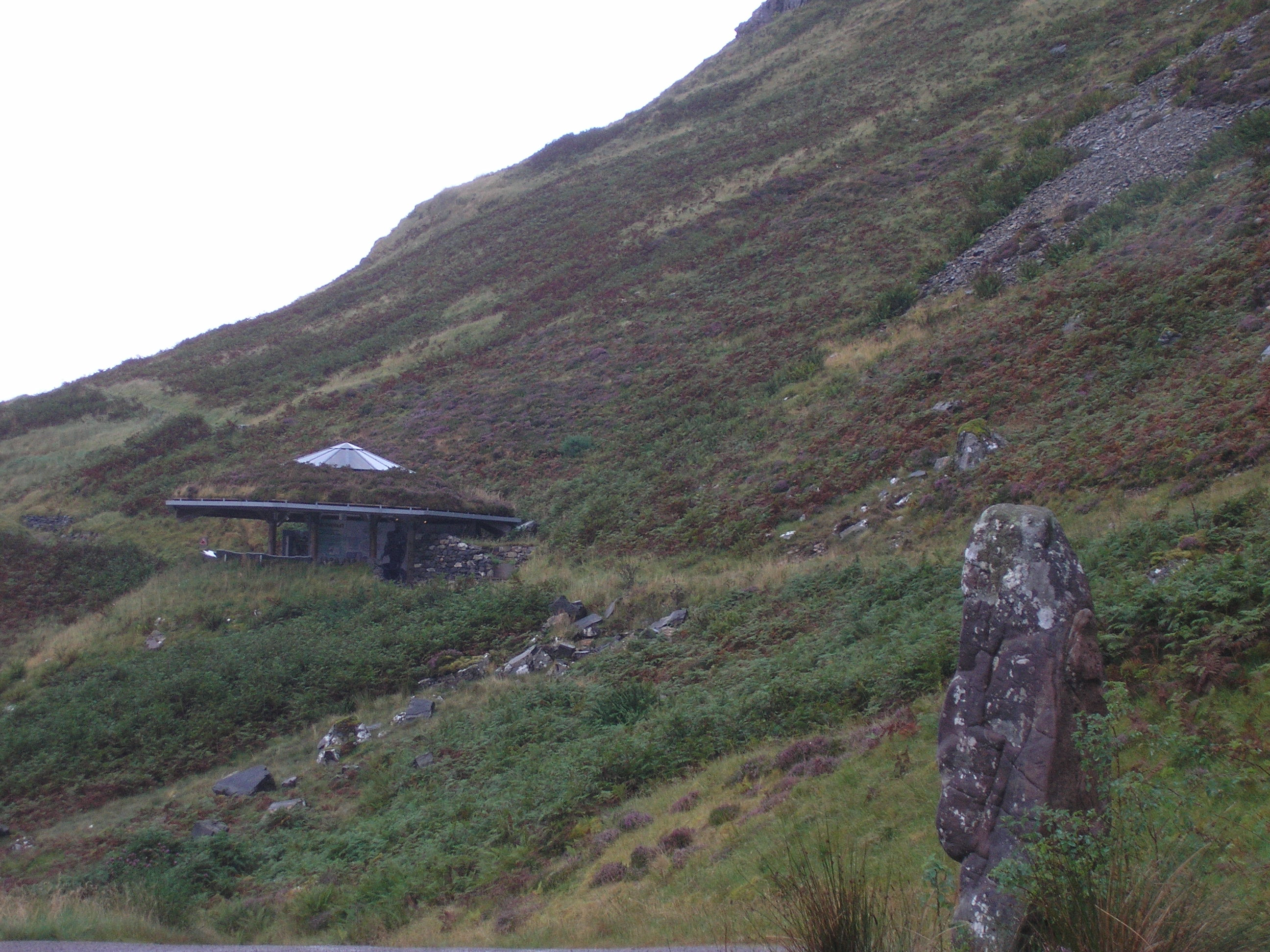
Knockan Crag visitor centre

Knockan Crag (Scottish Gaelic: Creag a' Chnocain, "crag of the small hill") lies within the North West Highlands Geopark in the Assynt region of Scotland 21 kilometres (13 mi) north of Ullapool. During the nineteenth century Knockan Crag became the subject of much debate when geologists noted that the Moine schists at the top of the crag appeared to be older than the Cambrian and Ordovician rocks such as Durness limestone lower down. Disagreements over the processes that could have caused this to occur were referred to at the time as the "Highlands Controversy". The argument was primarily between Roderick Murchison and Archibald Geikie on the one hand and James Nicol and Charles Lapworth on the other. Murchison and Geikie believed the sequence was wrong and that the Moine schists must be the younger rocks. The controversy was finally resolved by the work of Ben Peach and John Horne whose 1907 paper on the subject remains a classic text. Peach and Horne demonstrated that the situation resulted from the action of a thrust fault - this being the first to be discovered anywhere in the world. The older rocks had been moved some 70 kilometres to the west over the top of the younger rocks due to tectonic action.

The crag is designated as a national nature reserve (NNR) due to its geological features, and is owned and managed by NatureScot. There is a car park and interpretation centre that explains the geology of the area and gives background to the Highlands Controversy, along with three waymarked trails that take visitors to points of interest across the site. The site also hosts artworks such as 'The Globe' by Joe Smith and 'Pipeworm’ by Susheila Jamieson that were commissioned to highlight the inspiration that the landscape has had on artists and poets.

== Geological significance ==
The presence of metamorphic gneisses and schists lying apparently stratigraphically above sedimentary rocks of lower Paleozoic age in the Northwest Highlands had been known since the early nineteenth century, convincing Roderick Murchison that the change was a purely metamorphic effect and that the upper gneiss was younger than the sediments beneath. Initially he was supported in this interpretation by Geikie, and James Nicol. After further fieldwork, Nicol changed his mind and advocated instead that the contact at the base of the upper gneisses was tectonic, starting what was known as the Highlands Controversy. A tectonic interpretation was supported by, amongst others, Charles Lapworth who had corresponded with Albert Heim on similar structures in the Alps. In 1883 and 1884 the British Geological Survey geologists Ben Peach and John Horne were sent into the area by the survey's director Archibald Geikie to carry out detailed mapping. The results of the mapping proved conclusively to Peach and Horne that the contact was tectonic and they were eventually able to persuade Geikie when he visited them briefly in the field in October 1884. In November that year Peach and Horne's preliminary results were published and Geikie published a paper in the same issue of Nature in which he coined the term "thrust-plane" for these low-angle faults, although the term was probably already in use before then. By 1888 the term "Moine Thrust" was being used for the tectonic break at the base of Moine schists (what is now called the Moine Supergroup). The recognition of the Moine Thrust Belt in the early 1880s was a milestone in the history of geology as it was one of the first thrust belts discovered and where the importance of large scale horizontal rather than vertical movements became apparent. Detailed mapping of the Moine Thrust Belt by the survey continued for another two decades, culminating in the classic survey memoir The Geological Structure of the North-West Highlands of Scotland, published in 1907.

A monument to Peach and Horne's work was erected by the international geological community at Inchnadamph, a few miles to the north.

== Flora and fauna ==
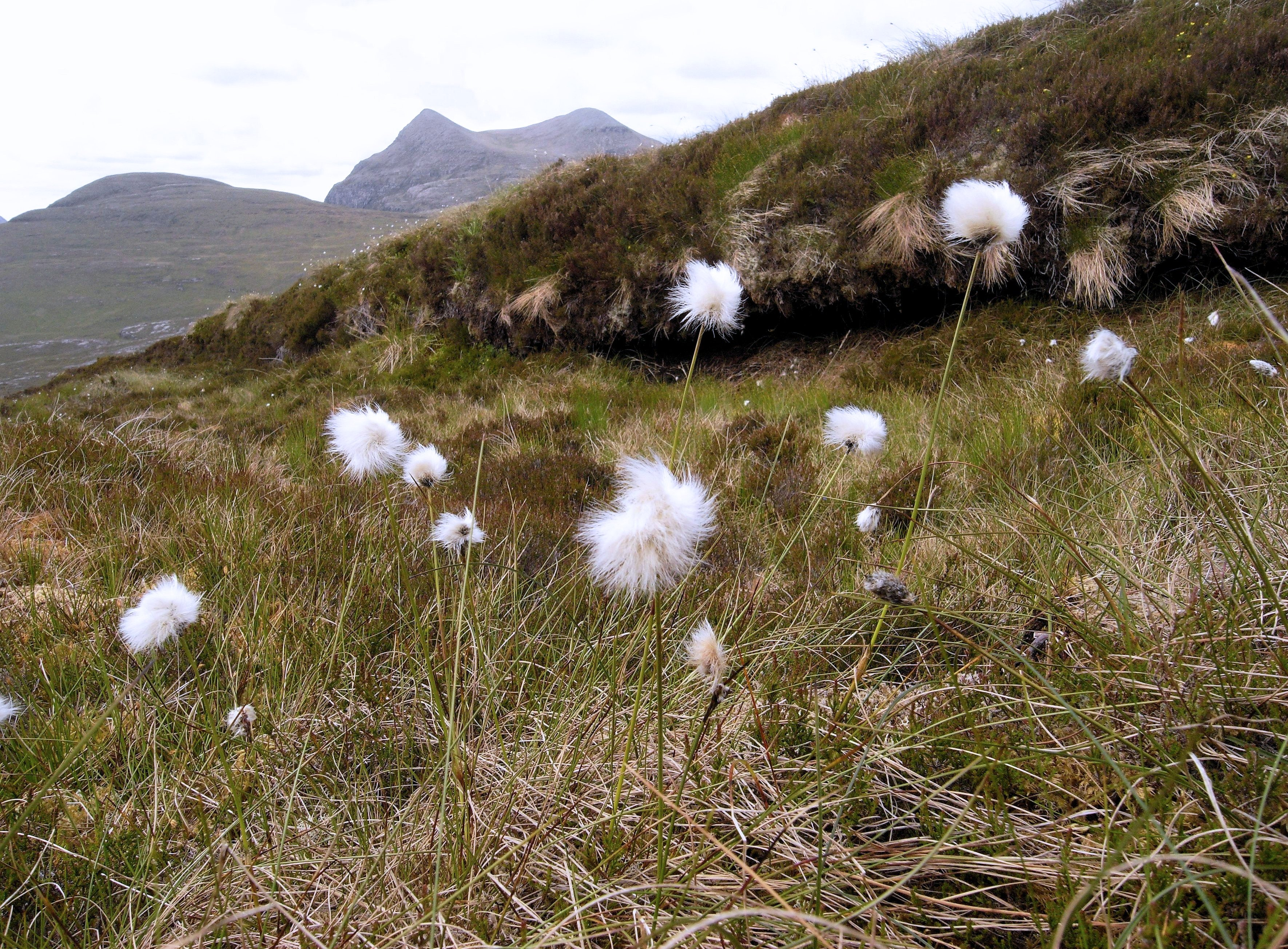
Cotton grass at Knockan Crag

The plant life of the area is highly influenced by its underlying geology. The soils formed on areas of limestone, fucoid beds and salterella grits are much richer than those on Moine schists. The lime-rich areas consequently support a richer vegetation, including plants such as mountain avens and rock sedge, whilst areas underlain by Moine schists tend to consist of wet heath and blanket bog. The transition between the two vegetation patterns is especially marked on the plateau above the crags, where there are small limestone knolls separated by peat-filled areas.

Bird species found at Knockan Crag include kestrel, raven and ring ouzel, along with song birds such as dunnock, wren, stonechat and meadow pipit. Red- and black-throated divers visit nearby Lochan an Ais during the winter and spring, and so can be observed from the crag. Scottish red deer regularly cross through the site.

== Conservation designations ==
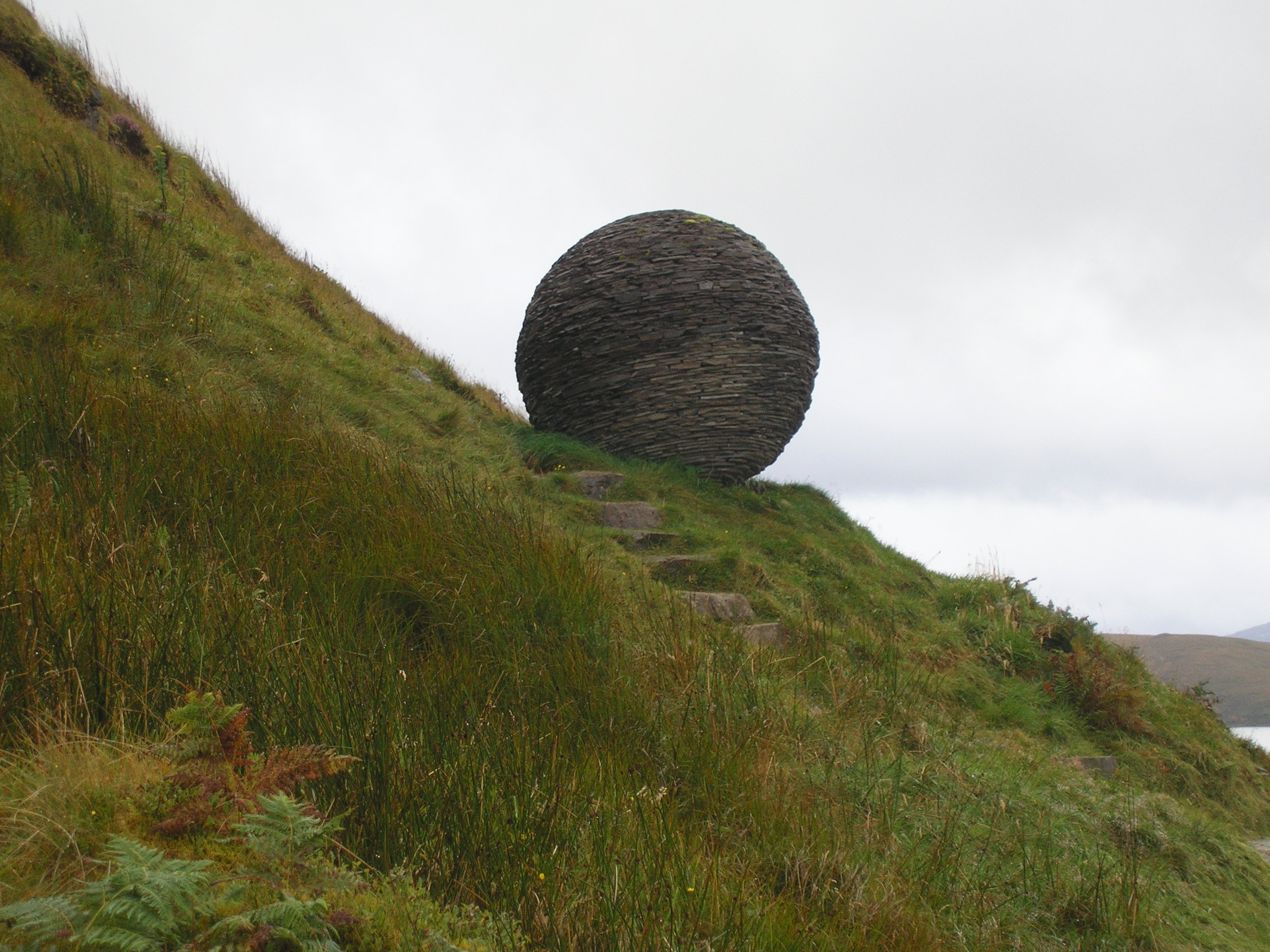
The Globe

Knockan Crag became part of the Inverpolly national nature reserve (NNR) on 28 September 1962. In 2004, following a review of all NNRs in Scotland, it was decided to remove NNR status from the wider Inverpolly area, however it was to be retained for Knockan Crag. The crag was declared a NNR in its own right on 24 February 2004.

The NNR is part of the wider Knockan Cliffs Site of Special Scientific Interest, and is classified as a Category III protected area by the International Union for Conservation of Nature. It also lies within the North West Highlands Geopark, part of the International Network of Geoparks.

== See also ==
- Geology of Scotland
