= Moine Thrust Belt =

Fault in Highland, Scotland, UK

Coordinates: 58°8′N 4°51′W

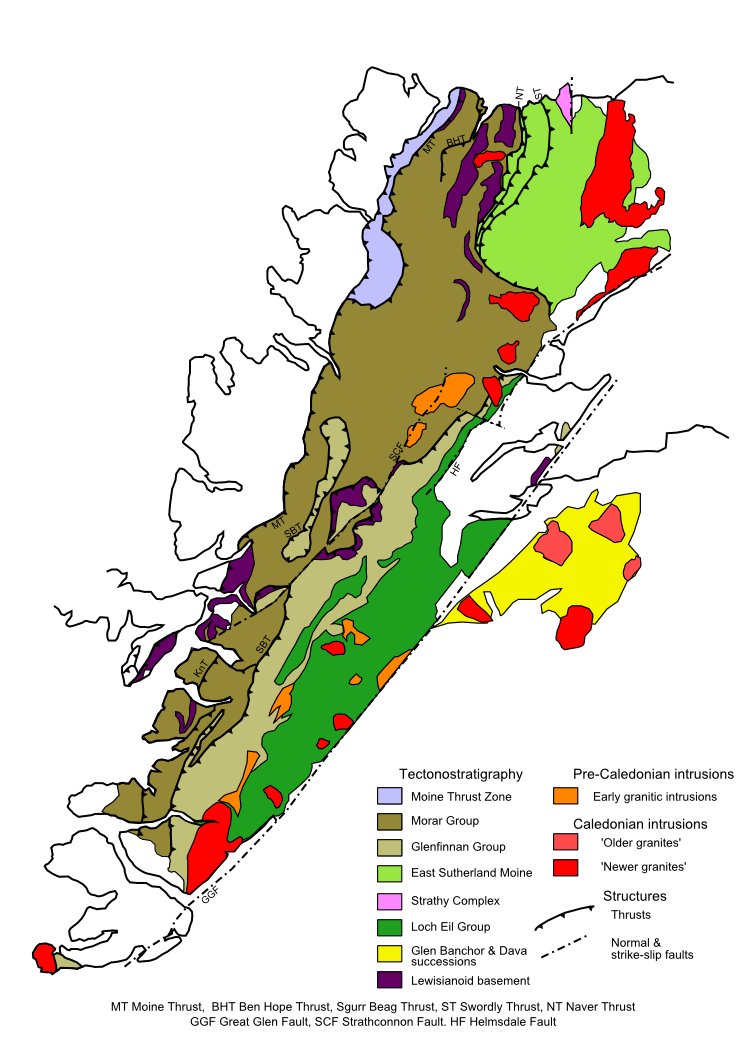
Moine Thrust belt defining the western edge of the Morar Group outcrop

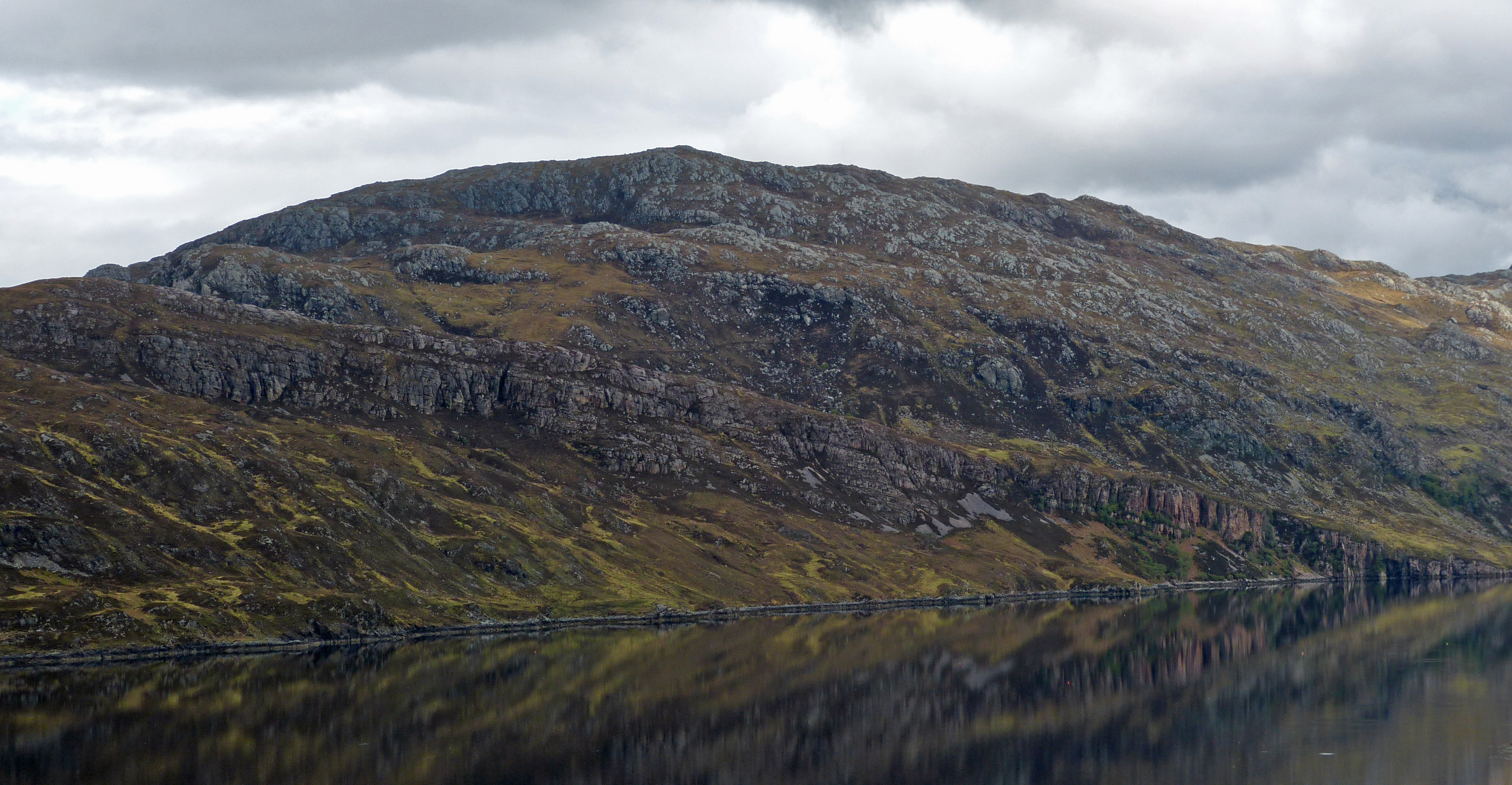
The Glencoul Thrust, part of the Moine Thrust Belt, dipping downwards from left to right, where Precambrian Lewisian gneiss has been pushed along the thrust fault and now lies above younger well-bedded Cambrian quartzite, which itself lies unconformably above Lewisian gneiss

The Moine Thrust Belt or Moine Thrust Zone is a linear tectonic feature in the Scottish Highlands which runs from Loch Eriboll on the north coast 190 kilometres (120 mi) southwest to the Sleat peninsula on the Isle of Skye. The thrust belt consists of a series of thrust faults that branch off the Moine Thrust itself. Topographically, the belt marks a change from rugged, terraced mountains with steep sides sculptured from weathered igneous, sedimentary and metamorphic rocks in the west to an extensive landscape of rolling hills over a metamorphic rock base to the east. Mountains within the belt display complexly folded and faulted layers and the width of the main part of the zone varies up to ten kilometres (six miles), although it is significantly wider on Skye.

== Discovery ==
The presence of metamorphic gneisses and schists lying apparently stratigraphically above sedimentary rocks of lower Paleozoic age in the Northwest Highlands had been known since the early 19th century, convincing Roderick Murchison that the change was a purely metamorphic effect and that the upper gneiss was younger than the sediments beneath. Initially he was supported in this interpretation by Archibald Geikie and James Nicol. After further fieldwork, Nicol changed his mind and advocated instead that the contact at the base of the upper gneisses was tectonic, starting what was known as the Highlands Controversy. A tectonic interpretation was supported by, amongst others, Charles Lapworth who had corresponded with Albert Heim on similar structures in the Alps.

In 1883 and 1884 the survey geologists Ben Peach and John Horne were sent into the area by the survey's director Archibald Geikie to carry out detailed mapping. The results of the mapping proved conclusively to Peach and Horne that the contact was tectonic and they were eventually able to persuade Geikie when he visited them briefly in the field in October 1884. In November that year Peach and Horne's preliminary results were published and Geikie published a paper in the same issue of Nature in which he coined the term "thrust-plane" for these low-angle faults, although the term was probably already in use before then. By 1888 the term "Moine Thrust" was being used for the tectonic break at the base of Moine schists (what is now called the Morar Group of the Wester Ross Supergroup). The Moine schists are named for the Moine peninsula in Sutherland. The recognition of the Moine Thrust Belt in the early 1880s was a milestone in the history of geology as it was one of the first thrust belts discovered and where the importance of large scale horizontal rather than vertical movements became apparent. Detailed mapping of the Moine Thrust Belt by the survey continued for another two decades, culminating in the classic survey memoir The Geological Structure of the North-West Highlands of Scotland, published in 1907.

== Caledonian structure ==
The Moine Thrust Belt was formed during the Scandian orogenic phase Caledonian Orogeny cycle as part of the collision between Laurentia and Baltica. It is the most westerly Scandian structure in Scotland apart from the Outer Isles Fault in the Outer Hebrides, which is developed within the Hebridean terrane. The Moine Thrust Belt defines the boundary between the Hebridean terrane to its northwest and the Northern Highlands terrane to its southeast. The thrust carried metamorphic material over 200 km across Scotland entirely masking the geology of the previous terrane. However, small windows, such as the Assynt window and the Glen Achall imbricated thrust system, allow geologists to estimate what the geology of Scotland was like before the Caledonian Orogeny.

The relationship between the Moine Thrust Belt and other Scandian age structures in Scandinavia and East Greenland remains unclear, due to uncertainties associated with the Great Glen Fault zone. This major sinistral (left-lateral) strike-slip fault was also active during the late stages of the orogeny, but continued to move during the early Devonian and appears to truncate the southern end of the thrust belt. The total late Caledonian displacement on the Great Glen Fault is poorly constrained, making reconstruction of the southern part of the orogenic belt difficult.

== Involved rock units ==
The stratigraphic sequence of the footwall of the Moine Thrust is the full sequence characteristic of the Hebridean terrane.

=== Lewisian complex ===
The Lewisian complex consists of mainly granitic gneisses that are of Archaean and Paleoproterozoic age. They form the basement to both the Stoer Group, the Wester Ross Supergroup and the Loch Ness Supergroup of the Northern Highlands terrane, in both the footwall and hanging wall of the Moine Thrust.

=== Torridonian ===
The Torridon and Sleat groups are of Neoproterozoic age and consists mainly of sandstone with a maximum preserved thickness of over 8 km. The unconformity at the base of these groups is highly irregular, showing that it was deposited on an eroded land surface.

=== Lower Palaeozoic ===
The Cambrian to lower Ordovician rocks consist of two groups, the Ardvreck Group and the Durness Group. The Ardvreck Group lies above an angular unconformity over various parts of the Torridon Group and locally over the Lewisian. It is a sequence of mainly quartz arenites. The lowermost part of the Eriboll Formation, the Basal Quartzite Member, is often pebbly at its base. The overlying Pipe Rock Member is a distinctive quartz arenite with many white weathering skolithos trace fossils that act as strain markers in areas of more ductile deformation. The uppermost two parts of the Ardvreck Group form the An t-Sron Formation, with the dolomitic Fucoid Beds Member being overlain by the quartz arenites of the Salterella Grit Member. The succeeding Durness Group consists mainly of dolomites, with some limestone and chert.

The distinctive character of this sequence enabled detailed mapping, even in areas of relatively poor exposure and allowed sections repeated by thrusting to be recognised.

=== Morar Group ===
The Morar Group, like the Torridon Group, is of Neoproterozoic age and interpreted to be a lateral equivalent of that unit within the overall Wester Ross Supergroup. The Morar Group forms the lowest tectonostratigraphic unit of the Neoproterozoic metasediments, lying tectonically beneath the younger Loch Ness Supergroup.

== Individual thrusts ==
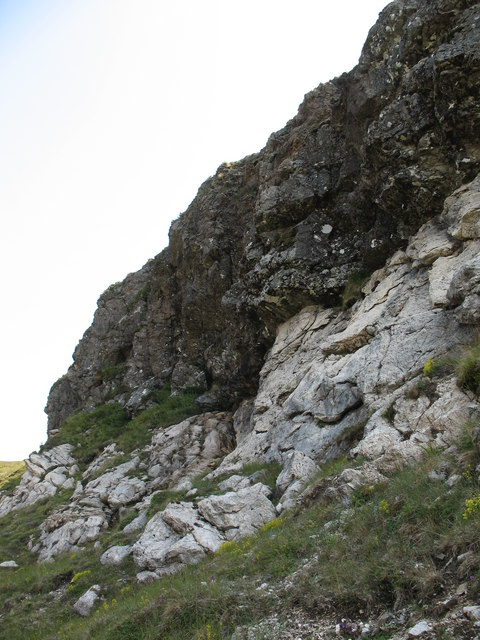
The Moine Thrust at Knockan Crag, in the central section of the thrust belt. Neoproterozoic Morar Group schists are thrust over Cambrian–Ordovician Durness Group dolomites

Cross-section over the Glencoul Thrust

In addition to the Sole Thrust at the base of the northern section of the structure and the Moine Thrust at the top of the belt, many other thrust faults are developed, some of which are large enough to be named and mapped more regionally. The thrust sheet carried by each thrust is named after the thrust beneath it, although the term "nappe" is also used.

=== Moine Thrust ===
The Moine Thrust in the strict sense is the uppermost thrust in the belt and the one that carries the most displacement. In all cases it carries rocks of the Morar Group over rocks of the Hebridean terrane. Unlike the other thrusts, there is a broad zone (up to 600 m in thickness) of the Morar Group in the hanging-wall that is intensely deformed into mylonite, indicating that it originated at a significantly deeper crustal level. Total displacement on this one structure has been estimated as several tens of kilometres based on the change in crustal level and the thickness of mylonites developed. In its central section, south of the Assynt Window, it becomes the sole thrust structure, before the Kinlochewe Thrust branches off to the south.

=== Sole Thrust ===
This thrust forms the base of the belt from Eriboll to the southern end of the Assynt Window where it merges with the Moine Thrust itself. It is thought to be the youngest formed thrust structure in the belt, which is consistent with a foreland propagating thrust sequence. Along strike the footwall of the Sole Thrust changes from Lewisian in the south to Cambrian in the north.

=== Arnaboll Thrust ===
In the Eriboll section this thrust carries Lewisian gneiss over the Pipe Rock. Its outcrop is complicated by the effects of later thrusting that both folds and offsets the Arnaboll Thrust. The exposures on the flank of Ben Arnaboll have particular importance as it was here that Lapworth first described the highly deformed rock type mylonite and also where Geikie coined the term "thrust plane".

=== Ben More Thrust ===
The Ben More Thrust is the largest and most continuous of the thrust faults developed between the Moine and Sole Thrusts within the Assynt Window.

=== Glencoul Thrust ===
This thrust is developed within the lower part of the belt in the Assynt Window.

=== Kinlochewe Thrust ===
The Kinlochewe Thrust branches off the Moine Thrust's central section and runs southwards past Kinlochewe to the Achnashellach Culmination, where it is truncated by the SW–NE trending Strathcarron Fault. It may originally have been continuous with the Kishorn Thrust.

=== Kishorn Thrust ===
The Kishorn Thrust extends from the Achnashellach Culmination, just north of Loch Carron, where it is truncated by the Strathcarron Fault. It continues southwestwards to Loch Kishorn, becoming the basal thrust. On the Isle of Skye, the Kishorn Thrust also marks the base of the Moine Thrust Belt bringing mainly Torridonian sandstones over foreland Cambrian-Ordovician limestones and quartzites. Locally on the Sleat peninsula the Kishorn thrust sheet is eroded to form the Ord window in which the foreland rocks once more appear.

=== Tarskavaig Thrust ===
At the southwestern end of the Sleat peninsula, the Tarskavaig Thrust carries Tarskavaig Group metasediments over the Sleat Group of the underlying Kishorn thrust sheet.

== Northward continuation ==
When the MOIST (Moine and Outer Isles Seismic Traverse) deep seismic profile was acquired north of the Scottish mainland by the BIRPS group in 1981 a series of east-dipping fault zones were imaged, two of which were interpreted as potential continuations of the Moine Thrust. The presence of half graben basins in the hanging walls of these faults was interpreted to represent Devonian and Mesozoic extensional reactivation of the Caledonian thrust structures. Further deep profiles acquired in the same area, the DRUM and GRID lines confirmed these features. Onshore in Shetland the Wester Keolka Shear was proposed to represent the Moine Thrust, although more recent radiometric dating results suggest that this is unlikely to be the case. The link between the structures imaged offshore and those onshore remains unclear.

== Southwestward continuation ==
Southwest of Skye the course of the Moine Thrust Belt becomes uncertain. It is assumed that it must pass to the southeast of the mainly Lewisian islands of Coll and Tiree. It is often shown passing through the Sound of Iona west of Mull, although no thrusts are actually exposed. It is presumed to be truncated by the Great Glen Fault zone somewhere southwest of Mull.

== Timing ==
Movement on the Moine Thrust Belt has been dated partly on its relationship with a series of igneous intrusions in the Assynt Window and partly from the results of radiometric dating of deformed rocks from the footwall or hanging-wall of the thrusts. The intrusions near Loch Borralan and Loch Ailsh have similar chemistry, both being forms of syenite, and have been dated at 430±4 Ma and 430.6±0.3 Ma respectively suggesting that they were intruded at about the same time. The Loch Ailsh intrusion outcrops within the Ben More thrust sheet and predates movement on that structure. The Loch Borralan intrusion lies beneath the Ben More Thrust. Locally the intrusion has been said to cut across the Ben More Thrust, but a lack of the metamorphic effects found elsewhere along the margin of the intrusion suggest that this contact is tectonic rather than intrusive. In the upper part of the Borralan intrusion, there is evidence of deformation of the syenite while it was still hot, suggesting that thrusting started soon after it was intruded.

== IUGS geological heritage site ==
In respect of it being 'the classic orogenic front of significant importance in both modern and historical tectonics research', the International Union of Geological Sciences (IUGS) included the 'Moine Thrust Zone' in its assemblage of 100 'geological heritage sites' around the world in a listing published in October 2022. The organisation defines an IUGS Geological Heritage Site as 'a key place with geological elements and/or processes of international scientific relevance, used as a reference, and/or with a substantial contribution to the development of geological sciences through history.'

== See also ==
- Knockan Crag
- Inchnadamph
- Geology of Scotland
