= Jethro Teall =

British geologist (1849–1924)

Portrait by Walter Stoneman, 1918

Sir Jethro Justinian Harris Teall FRS HFRSE PGS (5 January 1849 – 2 July 1924) was a British geologist and petrographist. Teallite is named after him.

== Life ==
He was born to Jethro Teall of Sandwich, Kent (1816-1848) and his wife, Mary Hathaway (1820-1880) in Northleach, Gloucestershire. He was educated at Northleach Grammar School then Berkeley Villa School in Cheltenham.

He studied Sciences at St John's College, Cambridge, specialising in Geology. In 1874, he was awarded the Sedgwick Prize for his study of lower-level greensand, a form of sandstone. He was elected a Fellow of the Royal Society in 1890, mainly on account of his book British Petrography, written in 1888. He won the Bigsby Medal in 1889. He was President of the Geological Society of London 1900–1902, and won the Wollaston Medal of the Society in 1905. He was awarded honorary doctorates by the University of Dublin (DSc) and the University of Oxford (DSc) and by the University of St Andrews (LLD).

In 1901, he became the Director of His Majesty's Geological Survey, personally completing much work in north west Scotland. He was knighted in 1916 for his contribution to the survey.

He was a member of the Athenaeum Club, London.

He died at Rosendale Road in London on 2 July 1924.

== Family ==
He married Harriet Moore Cowen (1856-1940) in 1879 and had two children, Major George (1880-1939) and Frederick Teall (1882-1952).

== Publications ==
- Teall, Jethro Justinian Harris (1888). British Petrography: with special reference to the igneous rocks. London: Dulau & Company.
