= Uamh an Claonaite =

Cave in Assynt, Highlands, Scotland

Coordinates: 58°6′16″N 4°56′9″W

- Interactive map of Uamh an Claonaite
- Location: Assynt
- Depth: 110 m (361 ft)
- Length: 2,868 m (9,409 ft)
- Cave survey: www.darkanddeep.co.uk

Uamh an Claonaite (Scottish Gaelic: Cave of the sloping rock) is the longest cave in Scotland. It consists of a series of dry passages and a series of at least six sumps which have been dived over the years.

The attempt by members of the Grampian Speleological Group to excavate a nearby sinkhole, Rana Hole, and connect into the final chambers from above achieved its aim in December 2007.

The length of the cave is 2,868 metres (9,409 feet) and the vertical range is 110 metres (360 ft).
