= Loch a' Mhadail =

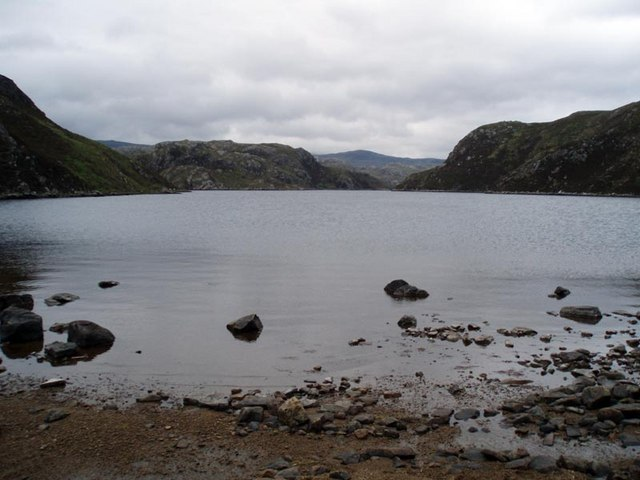
- Loch a' Mhadail Standing on the south west shore of the loch looking north east to where the loch narrows

- Location in Sutherland
- Location: NC 1575 1445
- Coordinates: 58.0806°N 5.1263°W
- Type: freshwater loch
- Primary inflows: Unnamed burn from unnamed lochan.
- Primary outflows: Unnamed burn that flows 1.5km to Lochan na Claise, thence through Allt' a Chinn Ghairbh to Loch Sionasgaig.
- Max. length: 0.80 km (0.50 mi)
- Max. width: 0.40 km (0.25 mi)
- Surface area: 21 ha (52 acres)
- Average depth: 30 ft (9.1 m)
- Max. depth: 69 ft (21 m)
- Surface elevation: 124 m (407 ft)
- Settlements: Elphin

Loch a' Mhadail or Loch a' Mhiotailt is a small freshwater lochan that lies immediately to the south-west of Loch Veyatie and is connected by a channel to Loch Veyatie within the area of Inverpolly. The channel measures about 20 foot in length, 10 feet in width and 1 foot in depth. When the water level is low, Loch a' Mhadail is separated from Loch Veyatie by a dyke made of Gneiss.

== National scenic area ==
The loch is located in an area along with neighbouring Coigach, as the Assynt-Coigach National Scenic Area, one of 40 such areas in Scotland.

== Geography ==
Loch a' Mhadail is located in an area that has a number of large lochs and small lochans with many burns and small rivers. To the west is the large central loch of Loch Sionascaig with its many islands, that receives water from Loch a' Mhadail via an unnamed burn. Almost directly north and to the west is Fionn Loch. Slightly to the east is the small Loch a Ghille. Directly south is the ridgeline of Coire Gom, that constitutes the northside of Cùl Mòr, a shapely, twin summited mountain that is the highest point in Inverpolly, at 849 m (2,785 ft). South of that is Drumronie Forest. To the north-east about 2 miles from the loch, is the imposing peak of Suilven at 731 m (2,398 ft). To the south-west is Loch an Doire Dhuibh and Loch Lurgainn and the mountain of Cùl Beag at 769 m (2,523 ft).

== Habitat ==
Loch a' Mhadail is located in Inverpolly, in an area that consists mostly of bogs, marshes and fens surrounding a number of inland lochs and rivers with some broad-leaved deciduous woodland coverage. Loch a' Mhadail along with other lochs in the area are nutrient poor with a low number of associated plant species that includes Juncus bulbosus, Littorella uniflora and Lobelia dortmanna. Larger lochs in the area, for example Loch Sionascaig have a higher variation in flora, for example, Isoetes lacustris, Subularia aquatica and Myriophyllum alterniflorum.

Inverpolly is covered in blanket bogs within a wet, cool, oceanic climate. Eriophorum vaginatum and Trichophorum cespitosum is predominant at low-lying and flat ground. Calluna and Eriophorum vaginatum are predominate at higher-ground. The large Atlantic liverwort Pleurozia purpurea is common in the area.

The habitat supports large numbers of the Eurasian otter.
