= Fionn Loch (Suilven) =

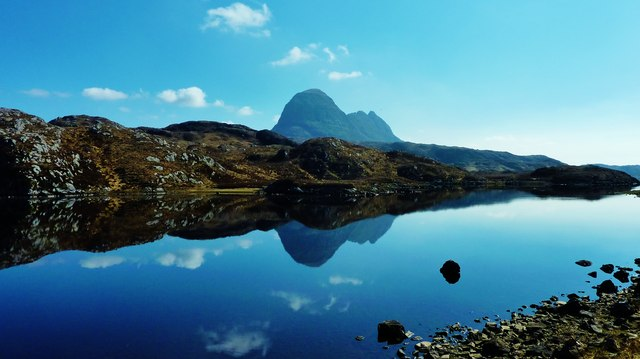
- Suilven reflected on Fionn Loch

- Location in Sutherland
- Location: NC13041741
- Coordinates: 58.106291°N 5.173018°W
- Type: freshwater loch
- Primary inflows: Uidh Fhearna from Loch Veyatie
- Primary outflows: River Kirkaig
- Max. length: 4.00 km (2.49 mi)
- Max. width: 0.48 km (0.30 mi)
- Surface area: 83 ha (210 acres)
- Average depth: 20.34 ft (6.20 m)
- Max. depth: 89.89 ft (27.40 m)
- Water volume: 182,731,116.7 ft^{3} (5,174,369.00 m^{3})
- Shore length^{1}: 12 km (7.5 mi)
- Surface elevation: 114 m (374 ft)
- Max. temperature: 53 °F (12 °C)
- ^{1} Shore length is not a well-defined measure.

Fionn Loch is a small irregular-shaped shallow freshwater loch, on a north-west to south-east orientation that is located 3 miles southeast of Lochinver in the Assynt district of Sutherland in Scotland. The loch is located in an area known as the Assynt-Coigach National Scenic Area, one of 40 such areas in Scotland.

== Geography ==
Fionn Loch is part of the Fionn Loch drainage system and is fed with water from River Ledbeg which drains Loch Urigill, due south-by-south east and Loch Borralan, to the east of Urigill. Loch Veyatie directly south, drains through Uidh Fheàrna, a slow-moving channel into Fionn Loch. The drainage system was once a large lake, Loch Suilven that is now made up of Cam Loch, Veyatie and Fionn Loch. A vast number of lochs and lochans surround Fionn Loch, the biggest is the large irregular-shaped Loch Sionascaig along with Inverpolly Forest directly south.

Overlooking the loch to the north-west is the imposing hulk of the mountains of Suilven at 731 meters. Almost directly south of the loch is Cùl Mòr at 849m and Drumrunie Forest. To the far north-west is Drumrunie Forest.

== Walking ==
Fionn Loch is remote and can be reached from a route that starts from Inverkirkaig, this route reaches the bealach from the south, passing Kirkaig Falls on the way.

== Gallery ==
Images of Fionn Loch

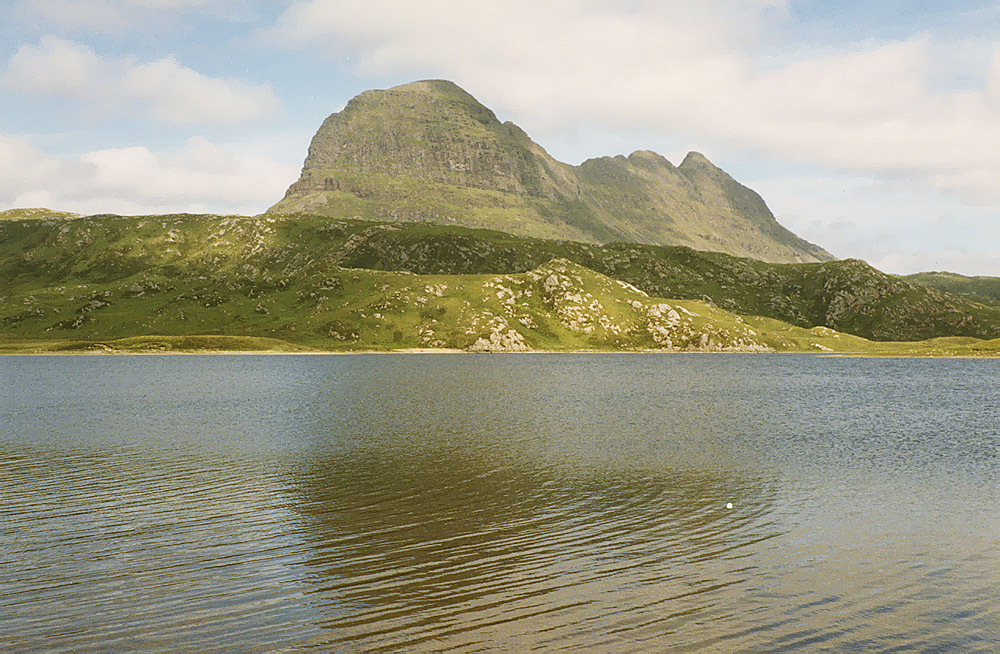
Fionn Loch looking towards Suilven.

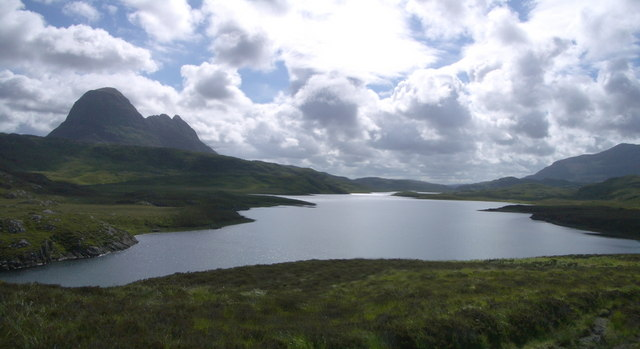
Fionn Loch and Suilven Fionn Loch and the prominent hill of Suilven lie south east of the coastal village of Lochinver in the Assynt area

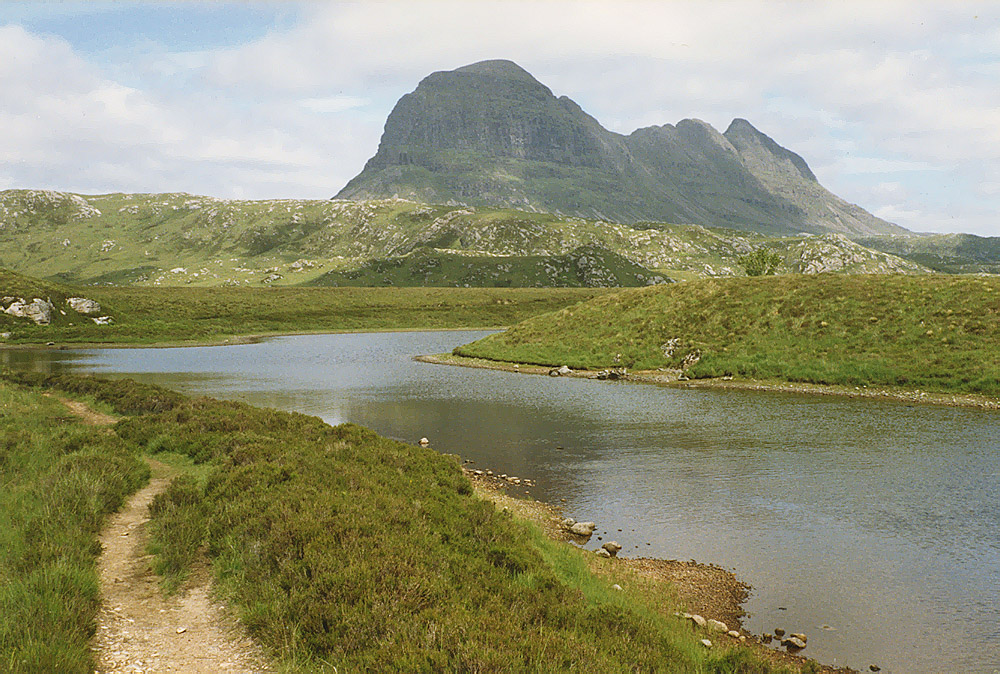
The start of the River Kirkaig The outflow from Fionn Loch where the River Kirkaig commences. Suilven can be seen in the distance.

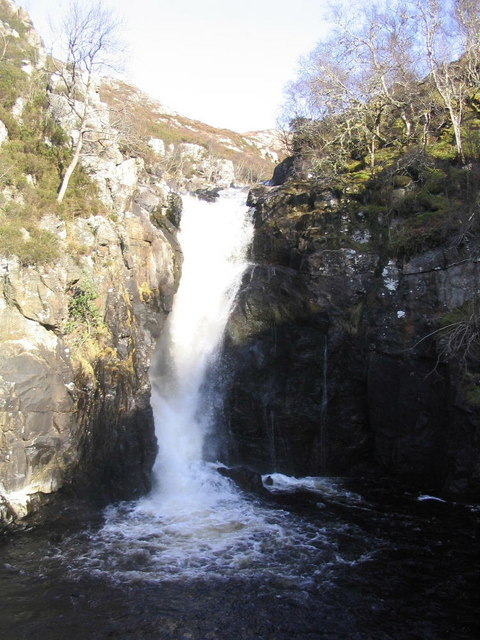
Falls of Kirkaig
