= Cam Loch, Sutherland =

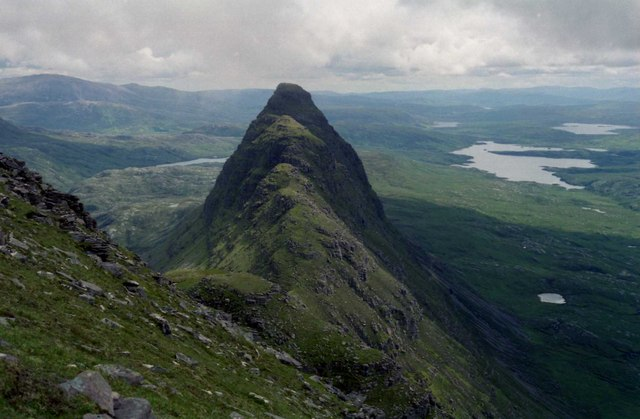
- Looking from Suilven, past the middle summit of Meall Meadhonach to Cam Loch in the distance.

- Location in Sutherland
- Location: NC21331348
- Coordinates: 58.0740°N 5.0308°W
- Type: freshwater loch
- Primary inflows: River Ledbeg
- Primary outflows: Abhainn Mhòr
- Max. length: 4.18 km (2.60 mi)
- Max. width: 0.917 km (0.570 mi)
- Surface area: 253 ha (630 acres)
- Average depth: 38 ft (12 m)
- Max. depth: 122 ft (37 m)
- Water volume: 1,025,740,415.89 ft^{3} (29,045,734.000 m^{3})
- Shore length^{1}: 17 km (11 mi)
- Surface elevation: 124 m (407 ft)
- Max. temperature: 56.2 °F (13.4 °C)
- ^{1} Shore length is not a well-defined measure.

Cam Loch (the crooked loch) is an irregularly-shaped freshwater loch, about 5 km long, on a north-west to south-east orientation, located slightly north of the village of Elphin, in the Assynt district of Sutherland, Scotland. The loch is located in an area along with neighbouring Coigach, as the Assynt-Coigach National Scenic Area, one of 40 such areas in Scotland.

== Geography ==
Located immediately to the south-west of Cam Loch, and at a slightly lower level, is Loch Veyatie, which is roughly parallel to it. The two lochs are connected by Abhainn Mhòr, which consists of extensions of the two lochs with a waterfall between them. It is an area that holds several large lochs, for example the irregular-shaped Loch Sionascaig, directly to the west. The loch is overlooked by the twin peaks of Cùl Mòr at 849m to the south-west. Directly south of the loch is Canisp at 847m. To the south-east, is the steep-sides ridge that forms the mountain of Suilven at 723m. Cam Loch sits in an area of wilderness landscape of moorland, bogs, and lochs and lochans.

Cam Loch is fed by inflows from Loch Urigill and Loch Borralan via the River Ledbeg. The loch drains via Abhainn Mhòr, into Loch Veyatie, that is part of the Fionn Loch Drainage System, that drains into Fionn Loch, that in turn is drained by the River Kirkaig into the sea.

== Interglacial site ==
Cam Loch is internationally important as one of the most intensively studied late glacial sites in Scotland, in studies by members of the Freshwater Biological Association. It is a reference site for the stratigraphy of the late glacial in north-west Scotland and used to compare paleoecological research with sites elsewhere in the United Kingdom and Western Europe. The sediments preserved on the loch bed are important for reconstructing the late glacial period between 13000 and 10000 BP. The evidence provided by the sediment shows a rapid and marked climatic change during that period. Due to richness of the evidence, the loch has been intensively studied over the years. The sediments have been studied for their inorganic and organic geochemistry, pollen stratigraphy and diatom stratigraphy.

Cam Loch is designated a Site of Special Scientific Interest (SSSI) for its geological features, for the loch itself, and for the woodland surrounding it. Part of Cam Loch SSSI is part of the Inverpolly, Loch Urigill and Nearby Lochs Special Protection Area (SPA) due to the presence of the black-throated diver. Part of Cam Loch SSSI overlaps with Inverpolly Special Area of Conservation (SAC) due to the habitats and species present.

== Bibliography ==
=== Inorganic geochemistry ===
- Pennington, Winifred; Sackin, M. J. (September 1975). "I. Numerical Analysis". New Phytologist. 75 (2): 419–453. doi:10.1111/j.1469-8137.1975.tb01405.x.
- Pennington, Winifred (October 1975). "A chronostratigraphic comparison of Late-Weichselian and Late-Devensian subdivisions, illustrated by two radiocarbon-dated profiles from western Britain". Boreas. 4 (3): 157–171. doi:10.1111/j.1502-3885.1975.tb00687.x.
- Pennington, W. (1977). "Lake Sediments and the Lateglacial Environment in Northern Scotland". Studies in the Scottish Lateglacial Environment: 119–141. doi:10.1016/B978-0-08-020498-7.50013-3. ISBN 9780080204987.

=== Organic geochemistry ===
- Cranwell, P.A. (September 1981). "Diagenesis of free and bound lipids in terrestrial detritus deposited in a lacustrine sediment". Organic Geochemistry. 3 (3): 79–89. doi:10.1016/0146-6380(81)90002-4.
- Cranwell, P.A. (1977). "Organic geochemistry of Cam Loch (Sutherland) sediments". Chemical Geology. 20: 205–221. Bibcode:1977ChGeo..20..205C. doi:10.1016/0009-2541(77)90044-4.
- Pennington, W. (1977). "Lake Sediments and the Lateglacial Environment in Northern Scotland". Studies in the Scottish Lateglacial Environment: 119–141. doi:10.1016/B978-0-08-020498-7.50013-3. ISBN 9780080204987.

=== Pollen stratigraphy ===
- Pennington, Winifred (October 1975). "A chronostratigraphic comparison of Late-Weichselian and Late-Devensian subdivisions, illustrated by two radiocarbon-dated profiles from western Britain". Boreas. 4 (3): 157–171. doi:10.1111/j.1502-3885.1975.tb00687.x.
- Pennington, W. (1977). "Lake Sediments and the Lateglacial Environment in Northern Scotland". Studies in the Scottish Lateglacial Environment: 119–141. doi:10.1016/B978-0-08-020498-7.50013-3. ISBN 9780080204987.

=== Diatom stratigraphy ===
- Haworth, Elizabeth Y. (July 1976). "Two Late-Glacial (Late Devensian) Diatom Assemblage Profiles from Northern Scotland". The New Phytologist. 77 (1). Wiley: 227–256. doi:10.1111/j.1469-8137.1976.tb01516.x. JSTOR 2433656.
- Pennington, W. (1977). "Lake Sediments and the Lateglacial Environment in Northern Scotland". Studies in the Scottish Lateglacial Environment: 119–141. doi:10.1016/B978-0-08-020498-7.50013-3. ISBN 9780080204987.

== Gallery ==
Images of Cam Loch and surrounding areas

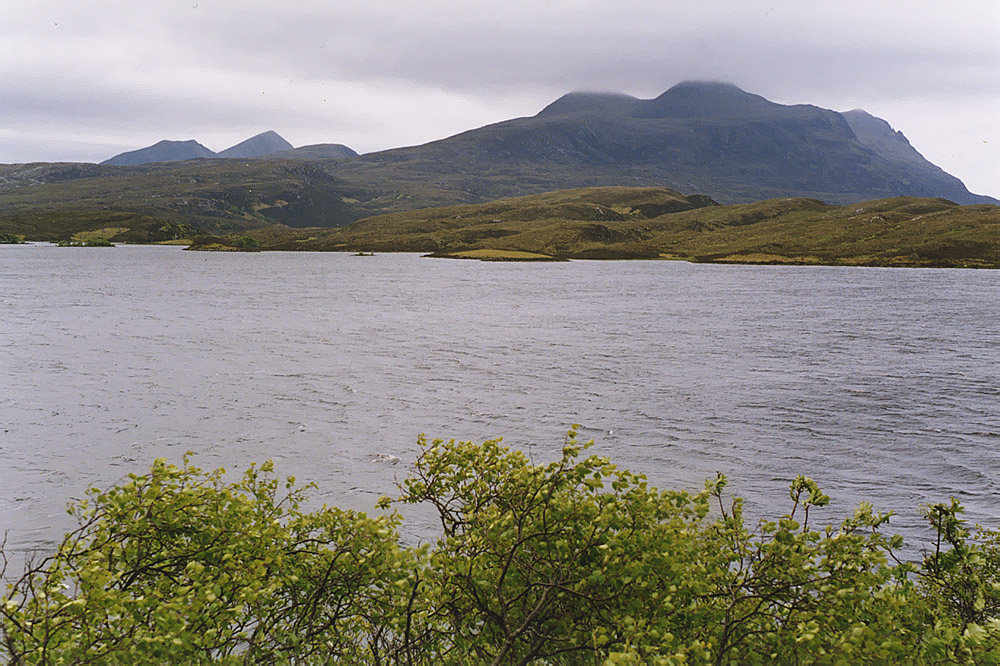
The Cam Loch Looking across the southern part of the Loch. Cul Mor is in the distance on the right, with Cul Beag and Ben More Coigach on the left.

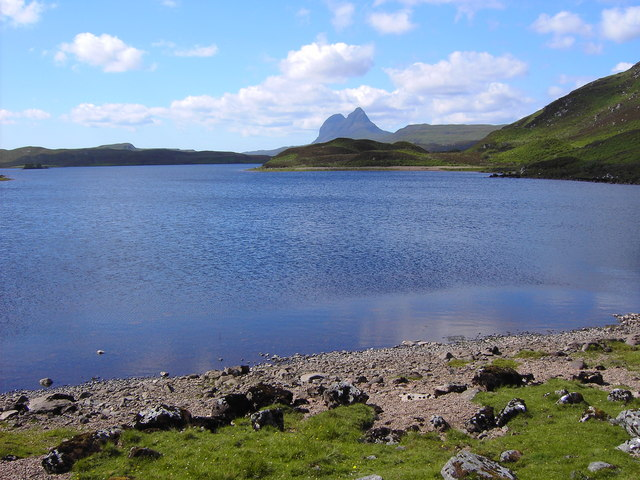
Cam Loch From the Lochinver/Ledmore path with Suilven in the background.

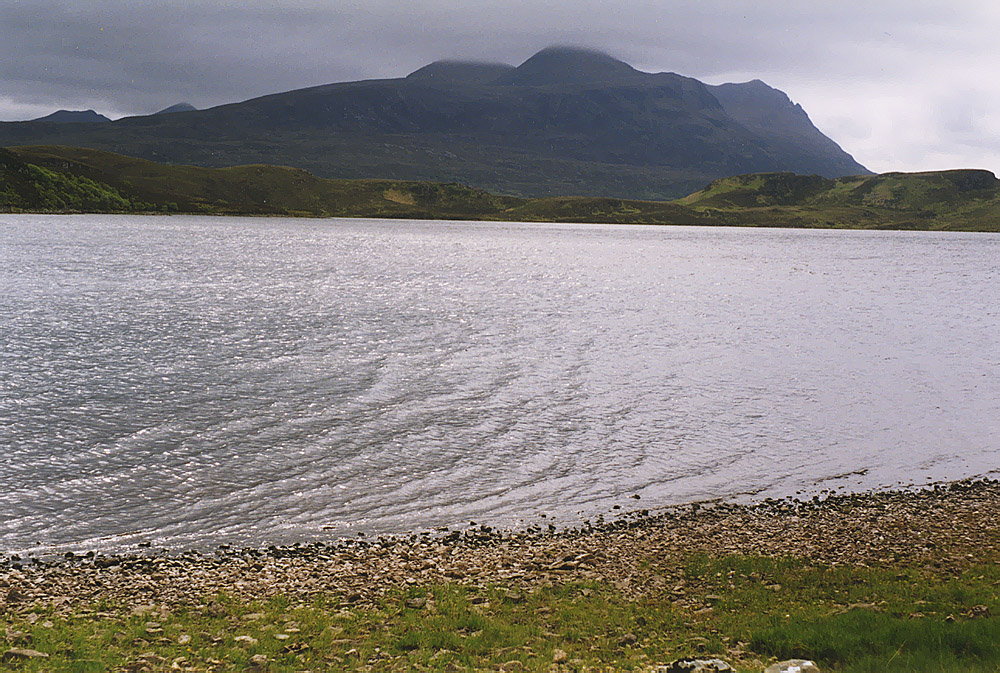
The Cam Loch Looking across the broad middle part of the loch, from where the Elphin to Lochinver path leaves the loch and heads inland. Cul Mor is beyond.

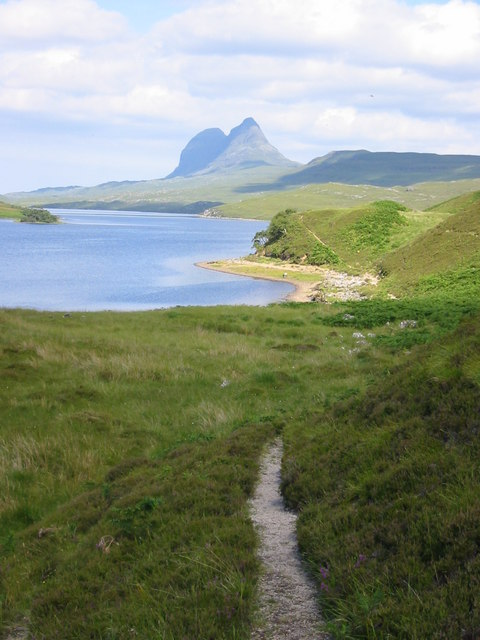
Cam Loch. From path to Suilven from Elphin.

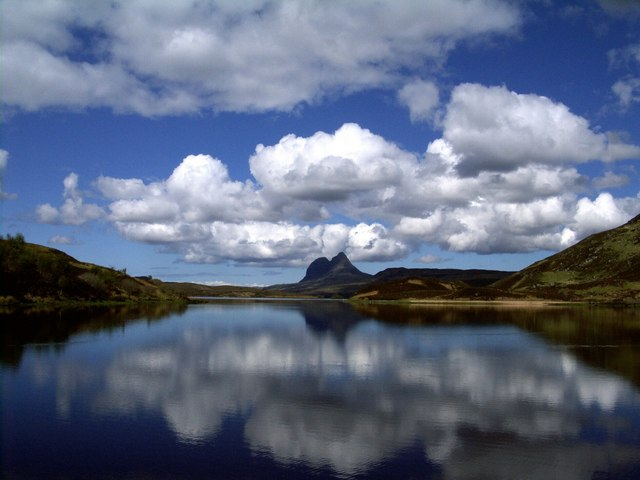
View over Cam Loch towards Suilven
