= Loch an Doire Dhuibh =

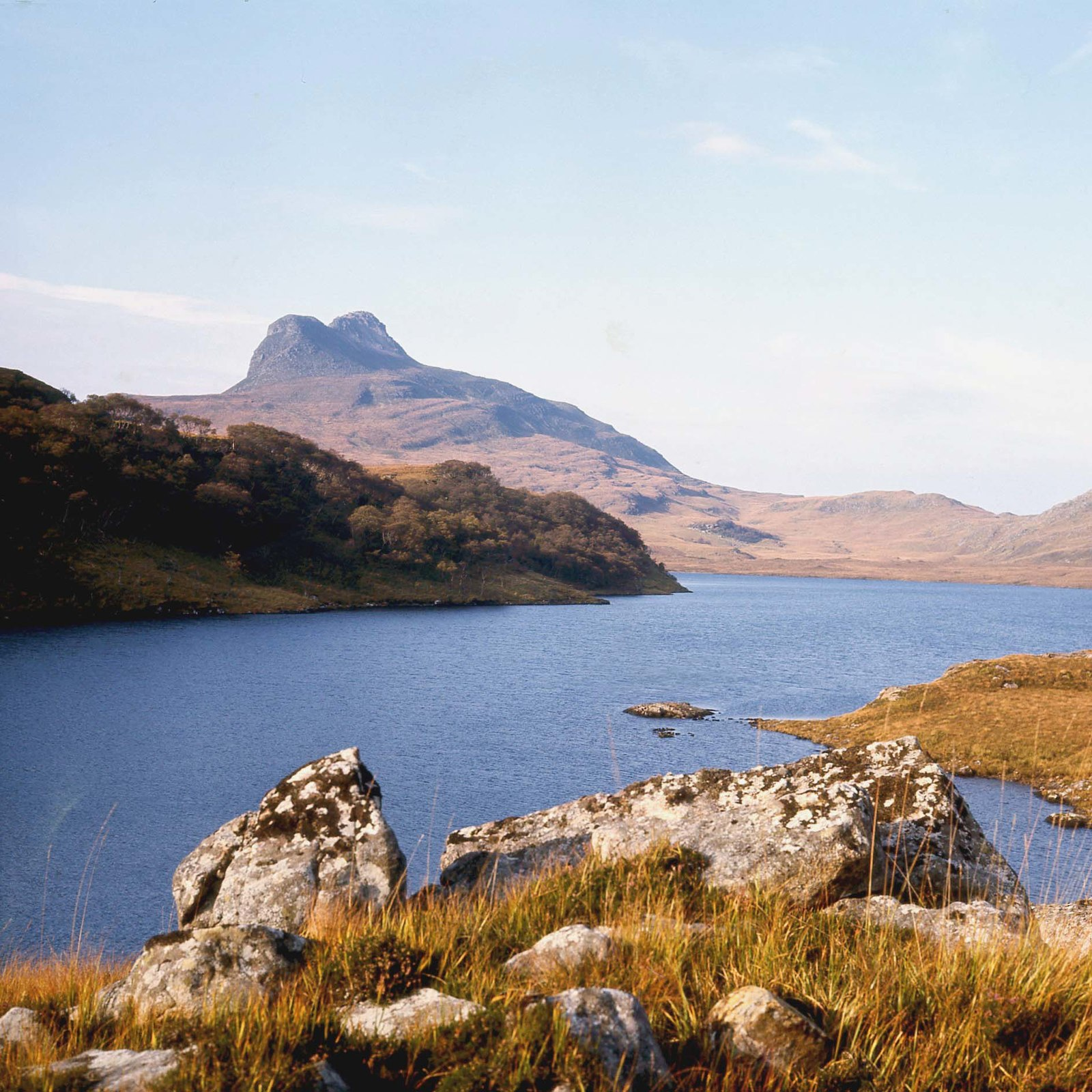
- Loch an Doire Dhuibh with Stac Pollaidh beyond.

- Location in Wester Ross
- Location: NC13851087
- Coordinates: 58.0467°N 5.157°W
- Type: freshwater loch
- Primary outflows: Unnamed
- Max. length: 1.45 km (0.90 mi)
- Max. width: 0.6 km (0.37 mi)
- Surface area: 77 ha (190 acres)
- Average depth: 24.6 ft (7.5 m)
- Max. depth: 59 ft (18 m)
- Water volume: 182,731,116.7 ft^{3} (5,174,369.00 m^{3})
- Shore length^{1}: 7 km (4.3 mi)
- Surface elevation: 77 m (253 ft)
- Max. temperature: 55.5 °F (13.1 °C)
- Min. temperature: 54.0 °F (12.2 °C)
- ^{1} Shore length is not a well-defined measure.

Loch an Doire Dhuibh is a small irregular shaped freshwater loch, situated on a north-east to south-west orientation in northern Wester Ross and located 7.5 miles southeast of Lochinver, Scotland. Directly to the northwest of the loch is Loch Gainmheich, considered the "northern portion" of the loch, by the editors of Bathymetrical Survey that is connected by a narrow channel with water flowing out of Doire Dhuibh and northwest to Loch Sionascaig. Loch an Doire Dhuibh is part of the Assynt - Coigach National Scenic Area.

== Geography ==
Loch an Doire Dhuibh is an area of outstanding natural beauty that is surrounded by many other lochs with the large forested areas of Inverpolly Forest to the west and Drumrunie Forest to the southeast. To the north is Loch Sionascaig and the wide sweep of Enard Bay. To the west is the mountain Stac Pollaidh and several lochs, the largest being Loch Lurgainn and Loch Bad a' Ghaill. To the southwest is the Coigach. To the south is Cùl Beag and to the west is Cùl Mòr with Loch Veyatie on the other side it bulk.

== Fishing ==
Loch an Doire Dhuibh is an excellent fishing loch with trout around 6oz to 8oz. The ideal flys for Fly fishing are "Soldier Palmer", "Greenwell's Glory" and "Dunkeld".

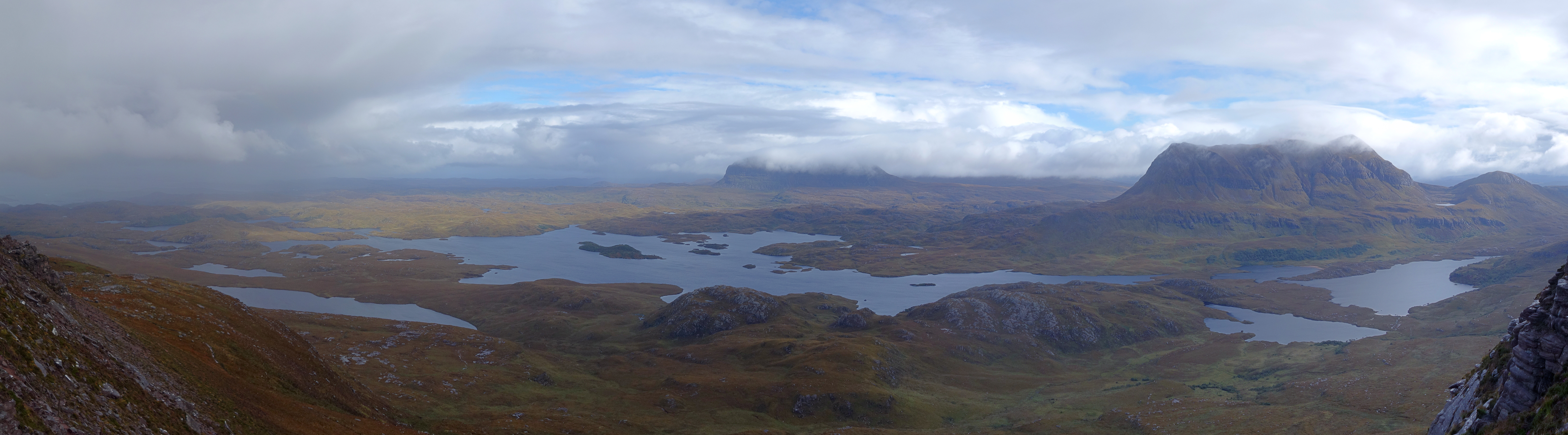
A view from the ridge of Stac Pollaidh looking north, showing Loch Sionascaig in the centre, Suilven beyond the Loch and, on the right, Cùl Mòr. Loch an Doire Dhuibh is to the extreme right.
