= Loch Lurgainn =

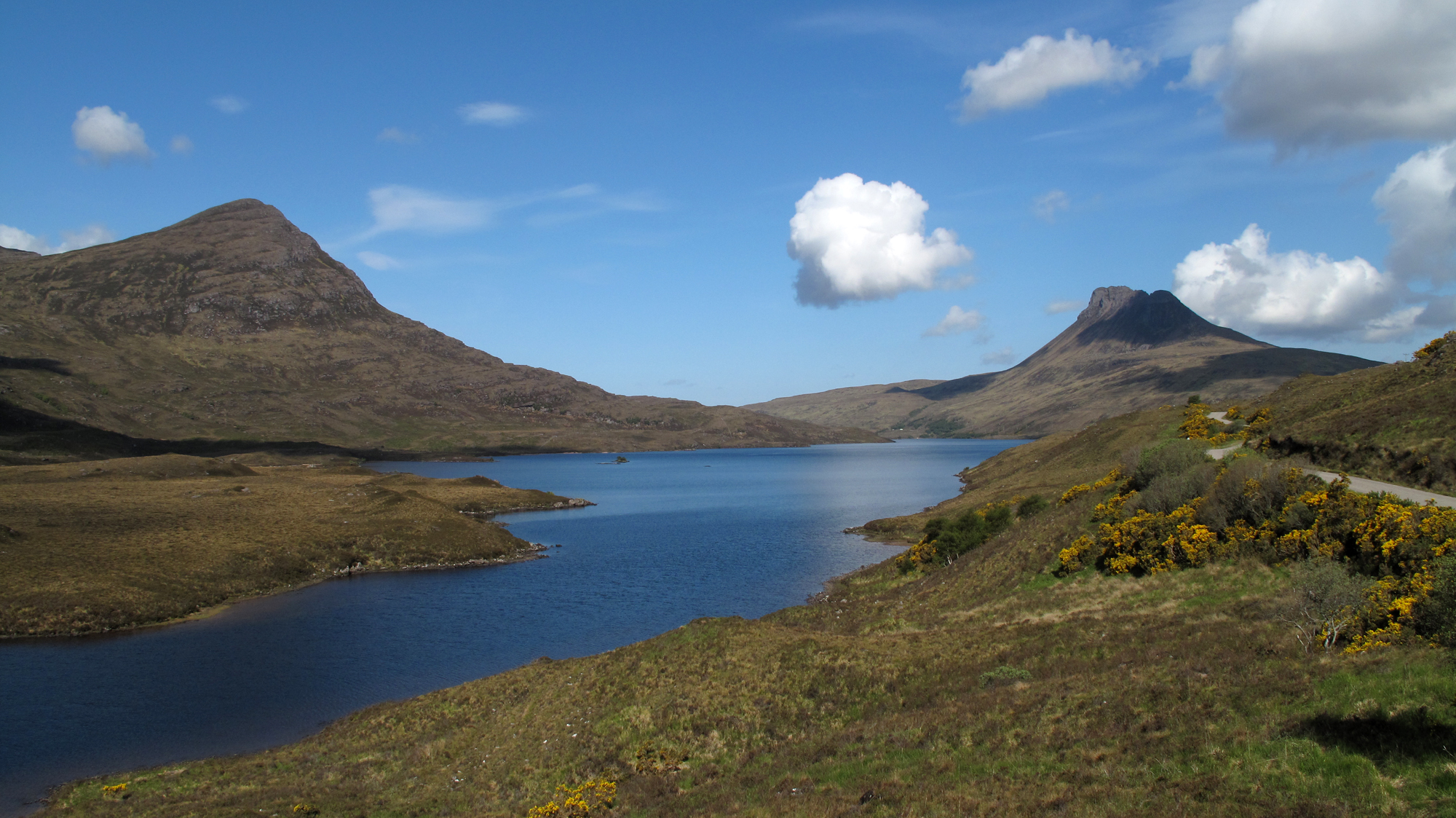
- Loch Lurgainn

- Location in Wester Ross
- Location: NC11130889
- Coordinates: 58.0214°N 5.1760°W
- Type: freshwater loch
- Max. length: 4.8 km (3.0 mi)
- Max. width: 1.6 km (0.99 mi)
- Surface area: 322 ha (800 acres)
- Average depth: 61 ft (19 m)
- Max. depth: 155 ft (47 m)
- Water volume: 16,237,602,958 ft^{3} (459,797,712.0 m^{3})
- Shore length^{1}: 19 km (12 mi)
- Surface elevation: 56 m (184 ft)
- Max. temperature: 56.1 °F (13.4 °C)
- Min. temperature: 50.3 °F (10.2 °C)
- ^{1} Shore length is not a well-defined measure.

Loch Lurgainn is a large remote and deep freshwater loch with a crescent shape with its concave side turned to the south. It is located in the Coigach peninsula in Lochbroom, Wester Ross. Loch Lurgainn is located 8 miles north of Ullapool and two miles south of Loch Sionascaig and is 3.5 miles southeast of Enard Bay. The scenic qualities of Coigach, along with neighbouring Assynt, have led to the area being designated as the Assynt-Coigach National Scenic Area, one of 40 such areas in Scotland. The main settlement in the area, located directly to the north-west is Achiltibuie.

== Geography ==
Loch Lurgainn is one of three lochs that extend on generally western direction and drains the loch in Enard Bay. The first of these is Loch Bad na h-Achlaise, a small lochan that drains into Loch Bad a' Ghaill in turn into the large Loch Osgaig, which drains through an unnamed river into the small Garvie Bay. To the north of Loch Lurgainn is the large loch of Loch Sionascaig.

The three lochs are contained in a long valley that is bounded by a series of peaks consisting of large hills and mountains with associated ridges. At the western edge of the loch is the mountain Cùl Beag at 769 m. At the southern, flanking the loch is Sgòrr Tuath, a hill at 587.5m. Moving west along the loch at its mid-section, and to the north is the mountain of Stac Pollaidh. As you move towards the sea, there is a ridge to the south with the small peak of Meall Doire an t-Sidhein at 181m, that gets progressively shallower as you approach Enard Bay.

== Fishing and walking ==
Loch Lurgainn at four miles long, has excellent fishing, but is infrequently fished. Due to its exposed position and strong currents, a good boat with a strong engine is recommended. Wearing of a Lifejacket is recommended. Trout that weigh more than 5lb's have been landed. The best flies are Black Pennel, Greenwells Glory and Dunkeld.

Loch Lurgain has a large number of well established walks of different grades.
