= Loch Culag =

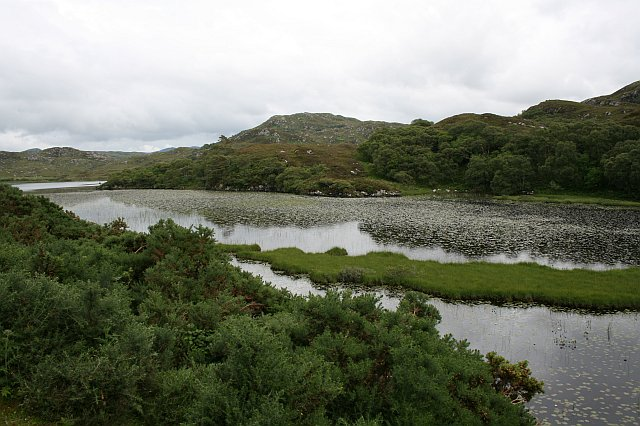
- Lily pads cover Loch Culag, on the minor road south of Lochinver.

- Location in Sutherland
- Location: NC09752165
- Coordinates: 58.14279938°N 5.233224164°W
- Type: freshwater loch
- Primary inflows: River River
- Primary outflows: Amhainn na Culeig
- Max. length: 0.8040 km (0.4996 mi)
- Max. width: 0.4023 km (0.2500 mi)
- Surface area: 15 ha (37 acres)
- Average depth: 3.60892 ft (1.10000 m)
- Max. depth: 8.85827 ft (2.70000 m)
- Water volume: 5,661,258 ft^{3} (160,309.0 m^{3})
- Shore length^{1}: 3 km (1.9 mi)
- Surface elevation: 24 m (79 ft)
- Max. temperature: 50.5 °F (10.3 °C)
- Min. temperature: 50.1 °F (10.1 °C)
- Islands: 0
- ^{1} Shore length is not a well-defined measure.

Loch Culag also known as Loch na Doire Daraich is a small freshwater shallow loch, located south of Lochinver in the Assynt district of Sutherland, Highland, Scotland. The loch is located in an area along with neighbouring Coigach, as the Assynt-Coigach National Scenic Area, one of 40 such areas in Scotland.

== Geography ==
The primary inflow to the loch comes from Loch Druim Suardalain, located three-quarters of a mile to the east, via the short Culag River (Gealic:Amhainn na Culeig), and flows out of Loch Culag and meets the sea in the harbour of Lochinver, a short distance later.

The loch is surrounded by low-hills to the east and flat hillocks in all other directions. The very top of the mountain Suilven, known as Caisteal Liath ("Grey Castle") at 731m is visible in a north-east direction. At the northern-west end of the loch is a small promontory or peninsula that hosts Lochinver primary school.
