= Loch Urigill =

- Loch Uiriollaich
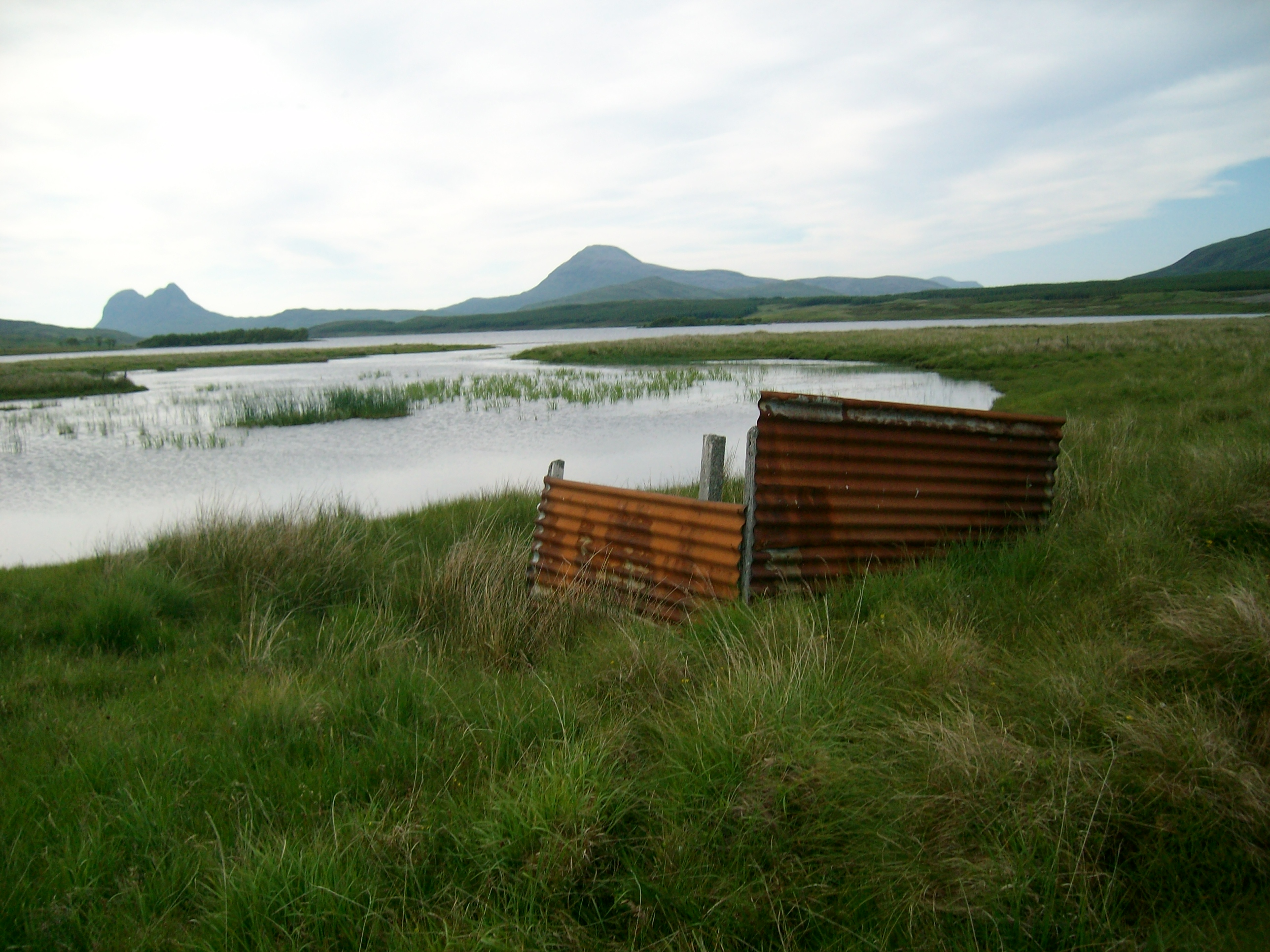
- Duck blind on Loch Urigill A swampy inlet at the head of loch Urigill. Suilven and Canisp on the horizon.

- Location within Sutherland
- Location: NC2441109870
- Coordinates: 58.045°N 4.977°W
- Type: freshwater reservoir
- Max. length: 3.2 km (2.0 mi)
- Max. width: 1.2 km (0.75 mi)
- Surface area: 195 ha (480 acres)
- Average depth: 13.12 ft (4.00 m)
- Max. depth: 40.02 ft (12.20 m)
- Water volume: 275,812,138 ft^{3} (7,810,130.0 m^{3})
- Shore length^{1}: 10 km (6.2 mi)
- Surface elevation: 157 m (515 ft)
- Max. temperature: 57.2 °F (14.0 °C)
- Min. temperature: 55.8 °F (13.2 °C)
- Islands: 4
- ^{1} Shore length is not a well-defined measure.

Loch Urigill (Scottish Gaelic: Loch Uiriollaich) is a freshwater loch near Elphin at the southern tip of the Assynt District in north-west Sutherland, Scotland.

It's 2 miles from Elphin and 1 mile from Ledmore. It is not directly linked to any main roads; however, small trails lead to the loch. The Loch is nearly 2 miles across and yet very rarely reaches over 5 metres in depth therefore making it easy for weeds and plants to grow inside the shallower ends of the loch. Loch Urigill has been designated a Site of Special Scientific Interest (SSSI) due to the habitats and bird species present. Loch Urigill SSSI is part of Inverpolly, Loch Urigill and Nearby Lochs Special Protection Area (SPA) due to the bird species present.

== Geography ==
Flowing out of the Loch is the Na Luirgean River a short river that only lasts for about 1.5 miles before flowing into the Ledmore River. Flowing in there is a collection of small streams and many small hills and peaks are around the loch but no large mountains.

== Tourism ==
Fishing is possible in the Loch and despite the shallowness it's been reported that large trout can be found inside Loch Urigill. The Doire Dubh nature reserve is just west of the Loch but just east is Loch Borralan which is larger, on a main road and has dedicated lodges for it making it a much larger and easier to access tourist attraction.
