= Falls of Kirkaig =

Waterfall in the Northwest Highlands of Scotland

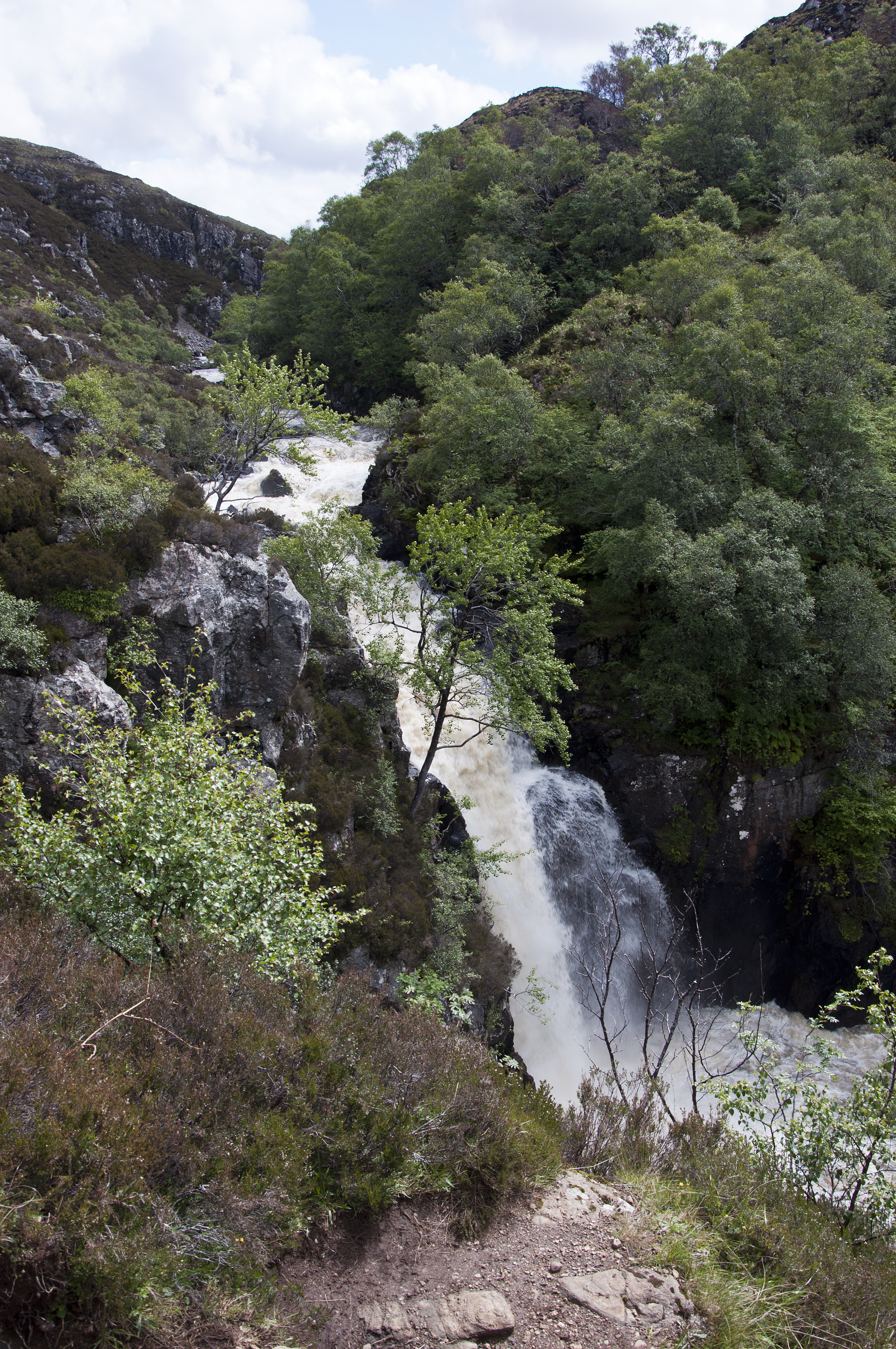
- Falls of Kirkaig

- Location within Highland
- Location: Sutherland, Highland, Scotland
- Coordinates: 58.109167°N 5.206111°W
- Total height: 20 metres (66 ft) (approximate)
- Watercourse: River Kirkaig

The Falls of Kirkaig is a waterfall in the Northwest Highlands of Scotland, in Sutherland, within the Highland council area. The falls are located on the River Kirkaig, south by southeast of the village of Lochinver, on the main approach footpath to Suilven mountain. They have a drop of almost 20 metres (66 ft). The River Kirkaig begins in Fionn Loch and flows over the Falls of Kirkaig before passing Inverkirkaig and emptying into Loch Kirkaig.

== See also ==
- Waterfalls of Scotland
