= Loch Sionascaig =

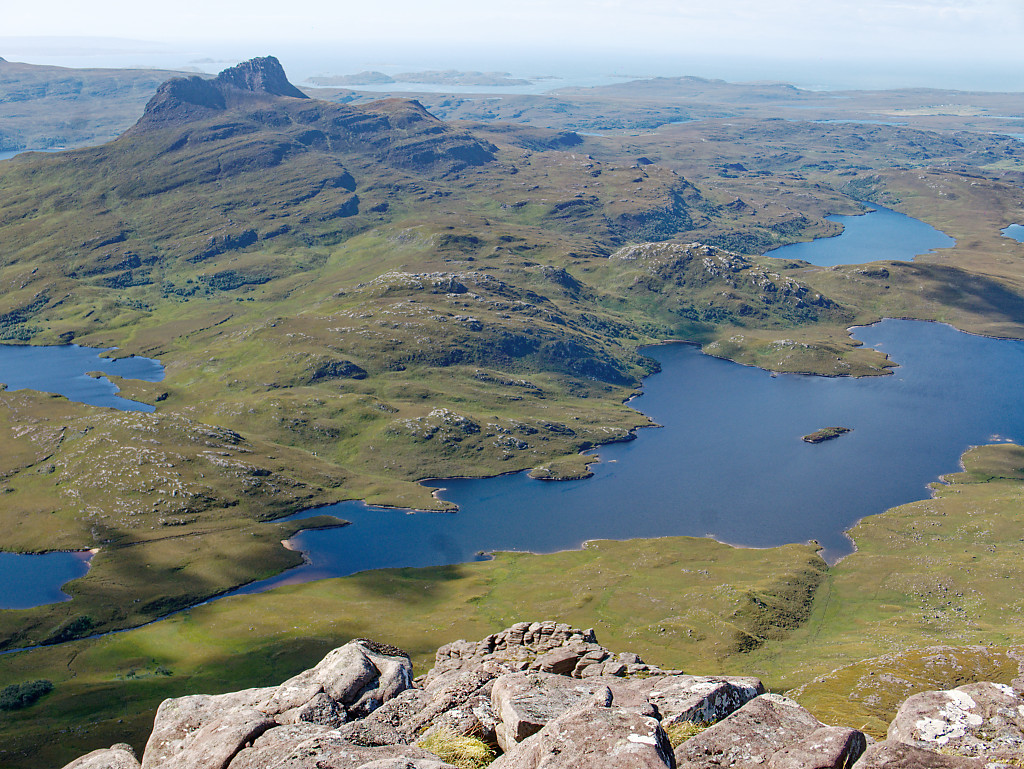
- On the nose of Sron Gharbh overlooking Loch Sionasgaig and Stac Pollaidh

- Location in Wester Ross
- Location: NC11491394
- Coordinates: 58.0733°N 5.1957°W
- Type: freshwater loch
- Primary outflows: Unnamed
- Max. length: 4.8 km (3.0 mi)
- Max. width: 1.6 km (0.99 mi)
- Surface area: 558 ha (1,380 acres)
- Average depth: 60.3 ft (18.4 m)
- Max. depth: 215.8 ft (65.8 m)
- Water volume: 3,626,243,856.8 ft^{3} (102,683,791.00 m^{3})
- Shore length^{1}: 37 km (23 mi)
- Surface elevation: 76 m (249 ft)
- Max. temperature: 54.2 °F (12.3 °C)
- Min. temperature: 49.6 °F (9.8 °C)
- Islands: 12 main islands and many smaller islands
- ^{1} Shore length is not a well-defined measure.

Loch Sionascaig is a large irregular shaped, freshwater loch in the remote Coigach area of northern Wester Ross. It is located 5.5 miles southeast of the village of Lochinver and is situated within the Inverpolly Forest.

== Geography ==
Loch Sionascaig (Note: In the Bathymetrical Survey, the loch that is referenced as Loch Skinaskink) is an area of outstanding natural beauty, that lies at the centre of the Inverpolly National Nature Reserve. It is surrounded by many other lochs with the large forested areas of Inverpolly Forest and Loch Lurgainn to the south. Also directly south is Loch an Doire Dhuibh which is connected by a narrow channel to Loch Sionascaig. To the southeast is the imposing peak of Cùl Beag and Drumrunie Forest. To the east is the large Loch Veyatie, to the northeast is the mountain of Cùl Mòr and Canisp behind it. To the north west is Loch Ùidh Tarraigean and Loch na Dàil that Loch Sionasgaig drains through, reaching the River Polly that drains into Polly Bay. To the west are the large lochs of Loch Bad A' Ghaill and Loch Osgaig.

Loch Sionascaig has numerous islands that are wooded. Eilean Mòr is the biggest and has a small hill that rises to 116m giving excellent views of the surrounding loch.

== Fishing ==
Loch Sionascaig is a renowned fishing loch with trout of around 6oz in size caught in the shallows up to more than 16lbs in the deeps.

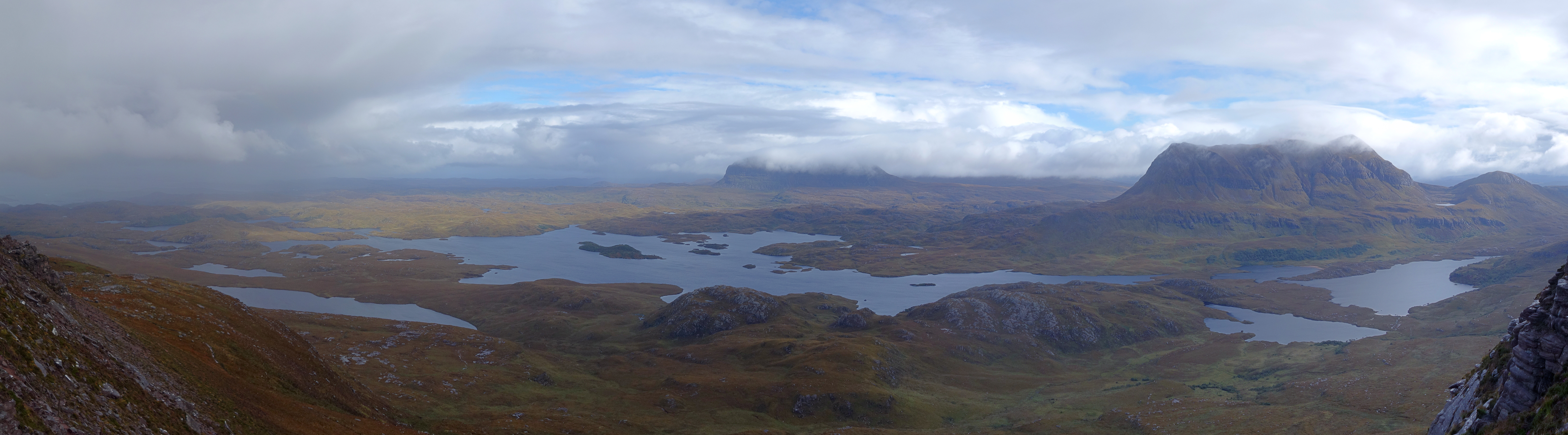
A view from the ridge of Stac Pollaidh looking north, showing Loch Sionascaig in the centre, Suilven beyond the Loch and, on the right, Cùl Mòr. Loch an Doire Dhuibh is to the extreme right.

== Academic study ==
Loch Sionascaig is one of the most intensively academically studied late glacial and Holocene sites in Scotland. Types of analysis that have been undertaken at the site include pollen analysis, diatom analysis, sediment geochemistry, peat stratigraphy and radiocarbon dating.
