= Loch Borralan =

Loch in Ross and Cromarty, Scotland

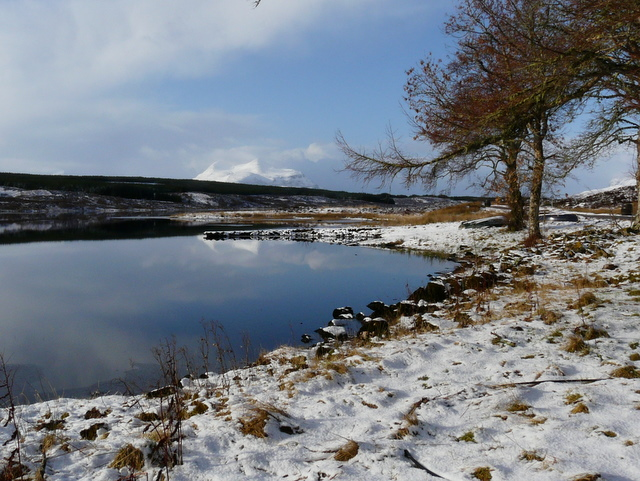
- Loch Borralan in deep winter

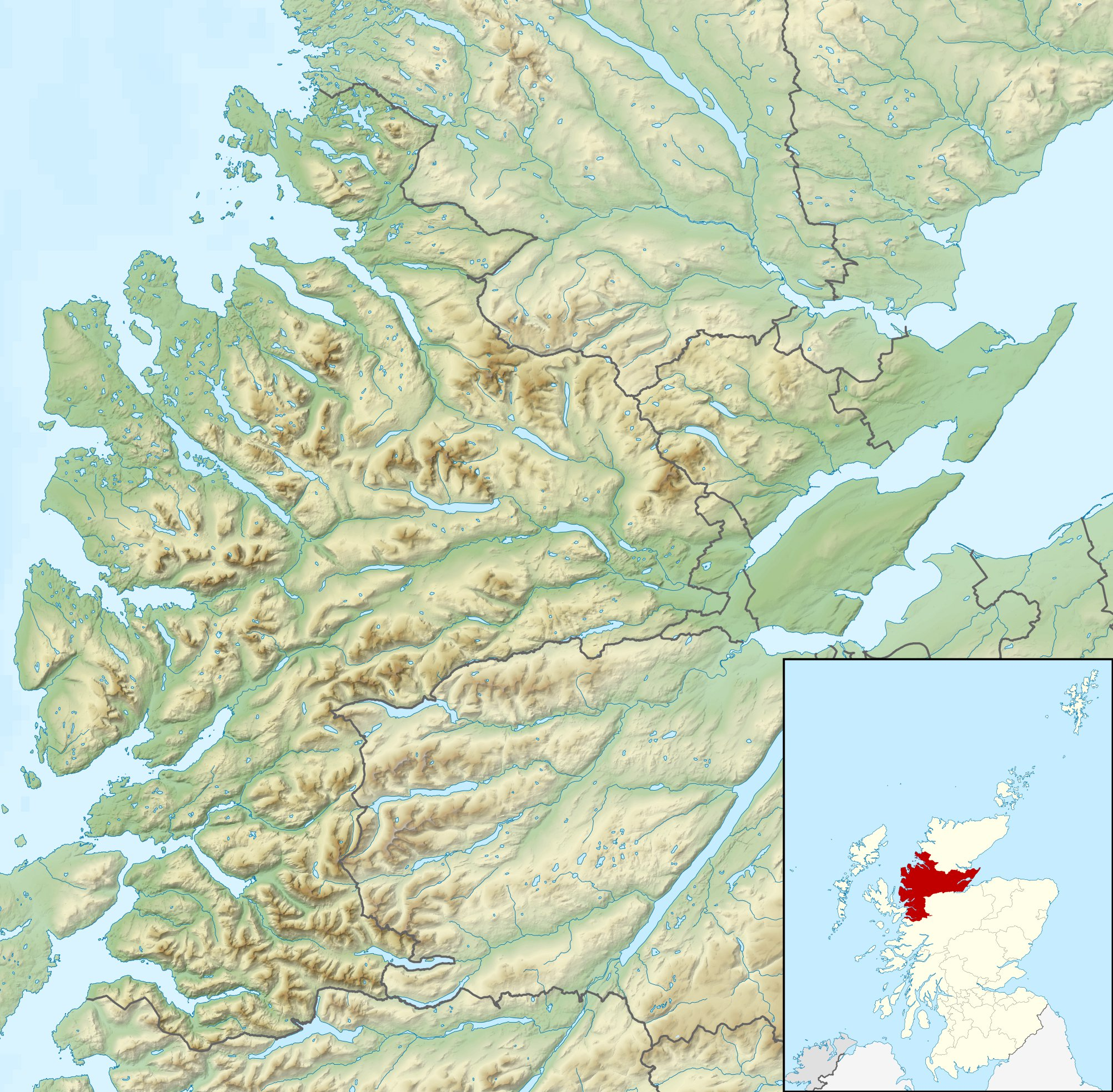
- Location within Ross and Cromarty
- Location: NC 2620 1085
- Coordinates: 58.0525°N 4.9463°W
- Primary inflows: Ault an Loin Duibh
- Primary outflows: Ledmore River
- Basin countries: United Kingdom
- Max. length: 1.6093 km (1.0000 mi)
- Max. width: 0.4023 km (0.2500 mi)
- Surface area: 47 ha (120 acres)
- Average depth: 9.514 ft (2.900 m)
- Max. depth: 21 ft (6.4 m)
- Water volume: 590,961,954 ft^{3} (16,734,179.0 m^{3})
- Shore length^{1}: 4 km (2.5 mi)
- Surface elevation: 142 m (466 ft)
- Max. temperature: 56.7 °F (13.7 °C)
- Min. temperature: 56.7 °F (13.7 °C)
- Settlements: Aultnacealgach
- ^{1} Shore length is not a well-defined measure.

Loch Borralan is a freshwater loch in the Assynt District of Sutherland in the Highland Council Area, northern Scotland.

It is located adjacent to the A837 main road near to the settlements of Aultnacealgach and Ledmore and is 18 miles (29 km) from Ullapool and 25 miles (40 km) from Lairg.

== Geography ==
The Loch is just over one mile (1.6 km) across and the settlement of Aultnacealgach is located directly on the Loch, there's also the Aultnacealgach Lodge which is also on the Loch but despite the name is on the other side. Finally there's the Alt Motel Located Just Northwest of the other Lodge. Both of these boost the tourism in the area, its proximity to the A837 makes most people go here instead of the nearby albeit larger Loch Urigill. Flowing into the loch there's the Ault an Loin Duibh and the much smaller Allt nan Cealgach and the Allt na Meine. Flowing Outward there's the Ledmore river which flows towards Loch Veyatie and eventually the Atlantic Ocean. There are also nearby peaks of Bad na Cleithe, Cnoc Gorm and Cnoc bad na h-Achlaise.

== Tourism ==
Loch Borralan is a tourist attraction given its location.

== Geology ==
The areas around Loch Borrolan are full of Igneous rocks such as borolanite. Which is typically white-spotted nepheline syenite unique to this area. Other rocks like pyroxene-rich mafic rock can be found blended in, overall there's a large range of particular rocks found around the banks of the loch. Largely in a nearby disused quarry.
