= Clashnessie =

Coordinates: 58.2305°N 5.30381862°W

Clashnessie: Scottish Gaelic: Clais an Easaidh
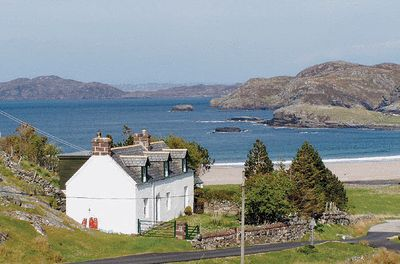
- Clashnessie Bay and de-crofted house

- Location within the Sutherland area
- OS grid reference: NC054307
- Council area: Highland
- Country: Scotland
- Sovereign state: United Kingdom
- Postcode district: IV27 4JF
- Police: Scotland
- Fire: Scottish
- Ambulance: Scottish

Clashnessie (Scottish Gaelic: Clais an Easaidh) is a small crofting community in the Assynt area of Sutherland on the north-west coast of Scotland.

The township (the old Scottish term for a crofting village) is scattered around the sandy beach of Clashnessie Bay and derives its name from the Gaelic clais an easaidh, meaning glen (clais) of the (an) waterfall (easaidh), referring to the waterfall at the head of the shallow glen in which most of the houses stand. Although 100 miles (160 km) north of Inverness, the village's micro-climate is generally mild, due to the closeness to the Atlantic Ocean Gulf Stream.

Today Clashnessie has just nineteen houses distributed widely over roughly a square mile area. Ten of these houses are original nineteenth-century crofters' cottages, or rebuilds, while the remaining nine are of more recent construction in a variety of styles. In the landscape around them are a number of ruined traces of earlier dwellings and barns, the unmortared blackhouses of the crofters who were first cleared to the coast from more arable homelands in the interior. By the 1960s the resident population had fallen to around a dozen people, although within living memory Clashnessie had an inn, a post office, and a shop. The ruins of the community mill, of the kind with a horizontally mounted water-wheel, can still be seen at the side of the burn which runs down from the waterfall. The traces of the old poorhouse can still also be found on the roadside. Today the community is truly international. Although many houses have been decrofted, there has been some successful revival of traditional crofting too, with Highland cattle joining Cheviot sheep on the community's common grazing. Access to broadband has made cyber-crofting possible, which also adds to the long-term viability of the township.
