= Balchladich =

Coordinates: 58.21692°N 5.34554°W

Balchladich: Scottish Gaelic: Baile a' Chladaich
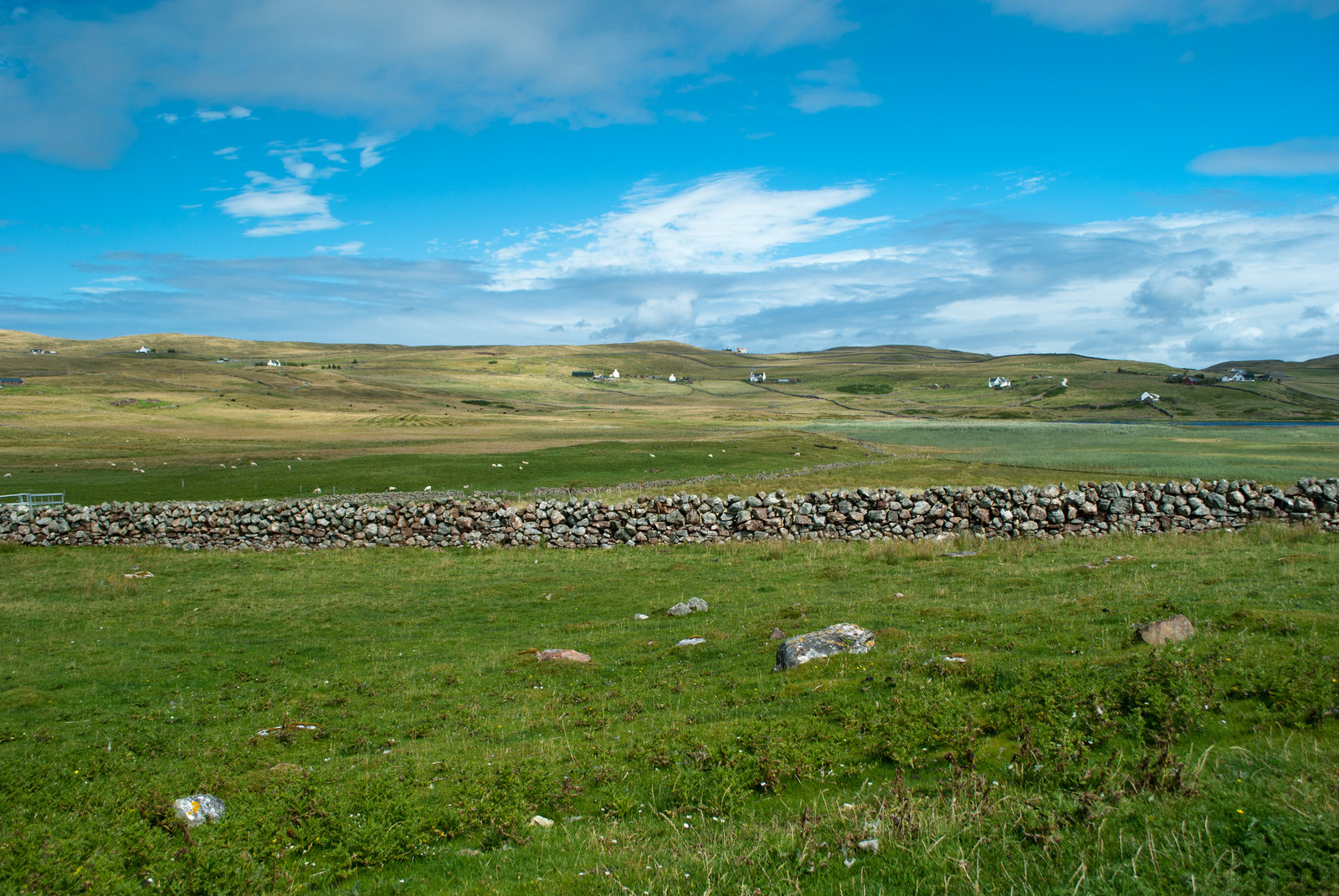
- Area surrounding Balchladich

- Location within the Sutherland area
- OS grid reference: NC035302
- Council area: Highland
- Lieutenancy area: Sutherland
- Country: Scotland
- Sovereign state: United Kingdom
- Post town: Lochinver
- Postcode district: IV27 4
- Police: Scotland
- Fire: Scottish
- Ambulance: Scottish

Balchladich (Scottish Gaelic: Baile a' Chladaich) is a remote township in the Assynt district of Sutherland, Scottish Highlands and is in the Scottish council area of Highland.
