= Borolanite =

Variety of nepheline syenite from Loch Borralan, Scotland

Borolanite is an historical petrological name for a pyroxene-melanite bearing nepheline syenite variety which contains nepheline-alkali feldspar pseudomorphs interpreted to be after leucite which occur as conspicuous white spots in the dark rock matrix. The rock occurs in the Borralan Igneous Complex or Loch Borralan Complex which is an alkalic igneous complex near Loch Borralan in northwest Scotland.

The 1911 Britannica described borolanite as: one of the most remarkable rocks of the British Isles, found on the shores of Loch Borolan (Loch Borralan) in Sutherland, after which it has been named. In this locality there is a considerable area of granite rich in red alkali feldspar, and passing, by diminution in the amount of its quartz, into quartz-syenites and syenites. At the margins of the outcrop patches of nepheline syenite occur; usually the nepheline is decomposed, but occasionally it is well-preserved; the other ingredients of the rock are brown garnet (melanite) and aegirine. The abundance of melanite is very unusual in igneous rocks, though some syenites, leucitophyres, and aegirine-felsites resemble borolanite in this respect. In places the nepheline syenite assumes the form of a dark rock with large rounded white spots. These last consist of an intermixture of nepheline or sodalite and alkali-feldspar. From the analogy of certain leucite syenites which are known in Arkansas, it is very probable that these spots represent original leucites which have been changed into aggregates of the above-named minerals. They resemble leucite in their shape, but have not yet been proved to have its crystalline outlines. The pseudo-leucites, as they have been called, measure one-quarter to three-quarters of an inch across. The dark matrix consists of biotite, aegirine-augite and melanite. Connected with the borolanite there are other types of nepheline syenite and pegmatite. In Finland, melanite bearing nepheline rocks have been found and described as ijolite, but the only other locality for melanite-leucite-syenite is Magnet Cove igneous complex in Arkansas.
