= Ardvar =

Coordinates: 58°15′23″N 5°07′05″W

Ardvar: Scottish Gaelic: Ardbhair
- Hamlet
- Location within the Highland council area
- OS grid reference: NC177326
- Civil parish: Assynt
- Council area: Highland
- Country: Scotland
- Sovereign state: United Kingdom
- Police: Scotland
- Fire: Scottish
- Ambulance: Scottish
- UK Parliament: Caithness, Sutherland and Easter Ross
- Scottish Parliament: Caithness, Sutherland and Ross

Ardvar is a small settlement in Assynt district of Sutherland located within the Highland council area of Scotland. It is located on the banks of Loch Ardbhair (Scottish Gaelic for Ardvar). It is located three miles from Drumbeg (nearest other settlement) and five from Unapool. It is also 25 miles from Ullapool and the A835 road. One mile from the town is the B869 road. Ardvar is elevated at around 20 metres above sea level.

== Geography ==
Ardvar is located to the east of Loch Ardbhair. it sits just north of a burn that flows into Loch Ardbhair, appropriately called Allt Ardbahir. Closer to the burn is the smaller settlement of Rowan Tree. Part of Ardvar is located directly on the shore of the loch. The area around Ardvar is surrounded by other lochs and burns as well as some small trails radiating out from the settlement itself. Some of them run back to the B869 and others run north to the coast such as Loch na Mola, Loch na Fionn Airce and Lochan na Dubh Leitir.

== Environment ==
The oak and birch woodland at Ardvar is one of the most northerly remnants of temperate Atlantic rainforest in Scotland.

== History ==
Old maps containing information on Ardvar have existed since 1902. Ardvar is home to a grade II listed building and some of the land around Ardvar are conservation areas.

== Transportation ==
At the road junction on the B869 where the slip road to Ardvar runs, there's a small bus stop called Ardvar.
