= Inverpolly =

Large area of northern Wester Ross in the Northwest Highlands of Scotland

Coordinates: 58.05583°N 5.20309°W

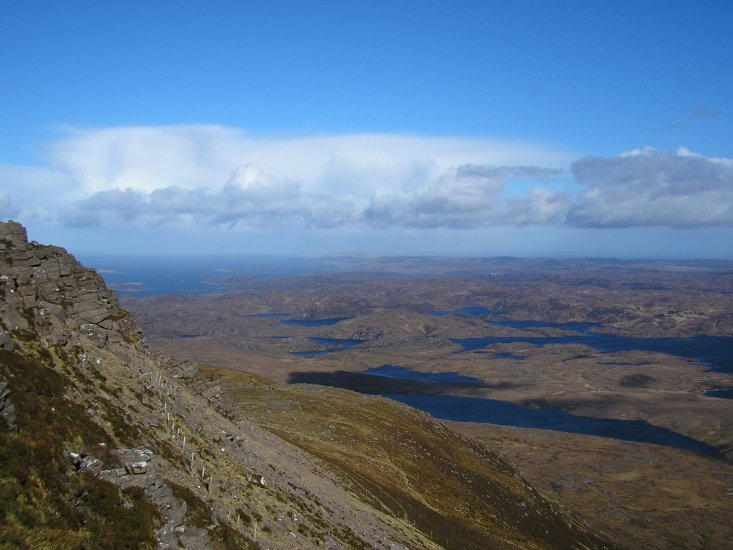
View over Inverpolly from Stac Pollaidh

Inverpolly is the name given to a large area of northern Wester Ross in the Northwest Highlands of Scotland, north of Ullapool. The area contains several prominent hills, rising up from a rough landscape of bogs and lochans. From 1961, the area was designated national nature reserve but since 2004, the designation has been limited to the area of Knockan Crag. The area supports a large number of high-quality freshwater loch habitats, the majority of which are oligotrophic. Major peaks in the area include Stac Pollaidh, Cul Mòr, Cul Beag. At the heart of Inverpolly lies the large irregular shaped Loch Sionascaig. Inverpolly is designated a Site of Special Scientific Interest and a Special Area of Conservation.
