= Loch Veyatie =

- Loch Mheathadaidh
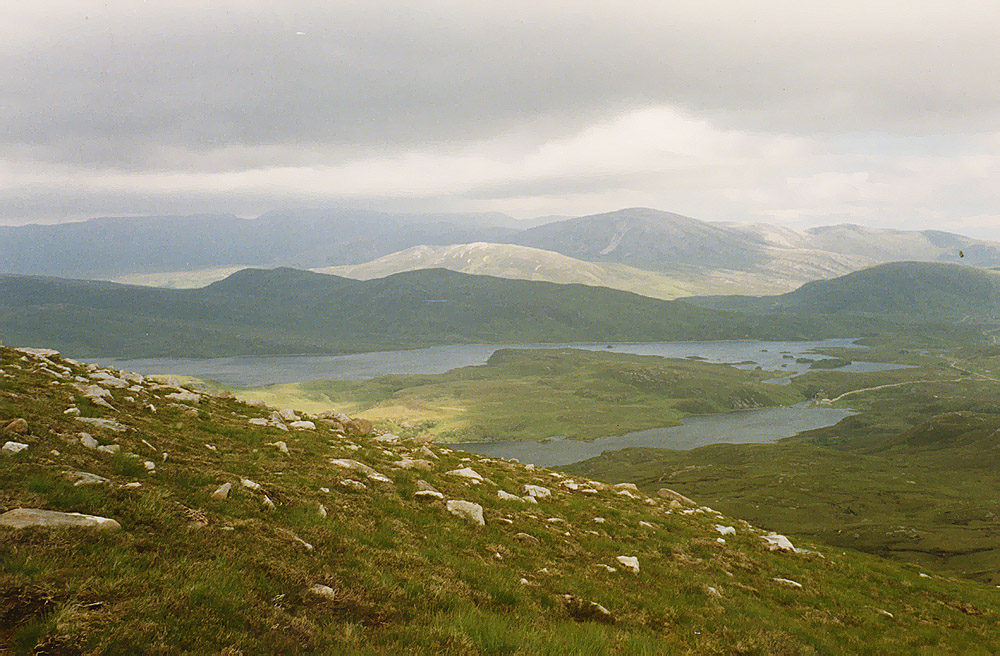
- View towards Loch Veyatie With the Cam Loch beyond and Ben More Assynt under cloud in the distance.

- Location in Sutherland
- Location: NC17871375
- Coordinates: 58.075529°N 5.088992°W
- Type: freshwater loch
- Primary outflows: Uidh Fheàrna
- Max. length: 6.4 km (4.0 mi)
- Max. width: 0.8 km (0.50 mi)
- Surface area: 257 ha (640 acres)
- Average depth: 41 ft (12 m)
- Max. depth: 125.8 ft (38.3 m)
- Water volume: 1,132,526,812.12 ft^{3} (32,069,588.000 m^{3})
- Shore length^{1}: 22 km (14 mi)
- Surface elevation: 124 m (407 ft)
- Max. temperature: 56.9 °F (13.8 °C)
- Min. temperature: 56.9 °F (13.8 °C)
- Settlements: Elphin
- ^{1} Shore length is not a well-defined measure.

Loch Veyatie (Scottish Gaelic: Loch Mheathadaidh) is a large freshwater loch in north-west Scotland. It stretches for 6 km north-westwards from the settlement of Elphin, and lies between Suilven (Sùlabheinn) and Cùl Mòr. The loch is located in an area known as the Assynt-Coigach National Scenic Area, one of 40 such areas in Scotland.

== Parish boundary ==
The boundary between Ross-shire and Sutherland (and therefore between the parishes of Lochbroom and Assynt) runs the length of the loch.

== Angling ==
Well known for its trout (including ferox) and charr, it is a popular destination for anglers. Run-off from a salmon hatchery at the eastern end of the loch attracts large fish, including, unusually, charr, into its main feeder river, the Abhainn Mhòr. The reservoir Cam Loch is directly located 1 km to the northeast, and follows the same orientation.

== Geography ==
Loch Veyatie is drained at its western end by Uidh Fheàrna, a channel of slow-moving water leading into Fionn Loch, which is itself drained by the River Kirkaig leading to the notable 20m Falls of Kirkaig before entering Loch Kirkaig.

== Frigate ==
The Loch-class frigate HMS Loch Veyatie was named after the loch.

== Gallery ==
Images of Veyatie and surrounding areas

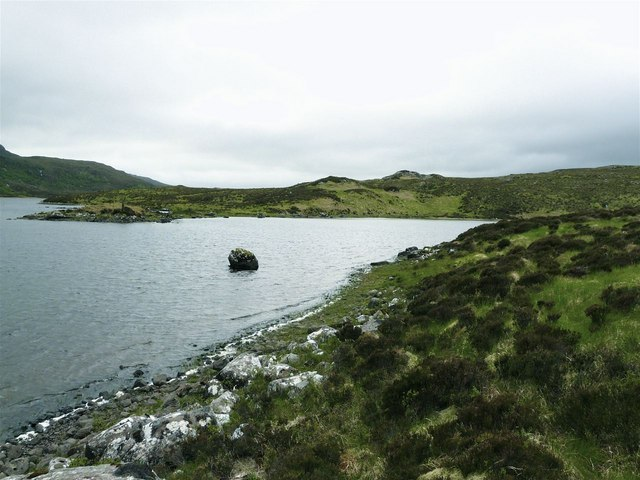
Bay below Creagan Mòr, Loch Veyatie. This sheltered bay was most welcome by a group of anglers on a rather windy day. At the inner end of the bay is the small beach

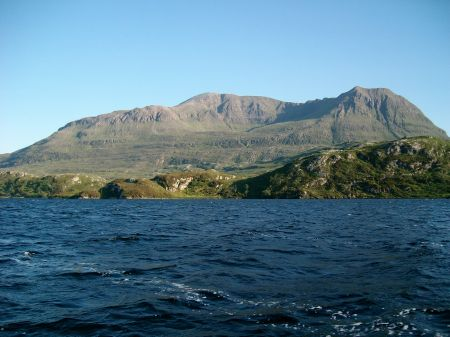
Cùl Mòr from a boat on Loch Veyatie

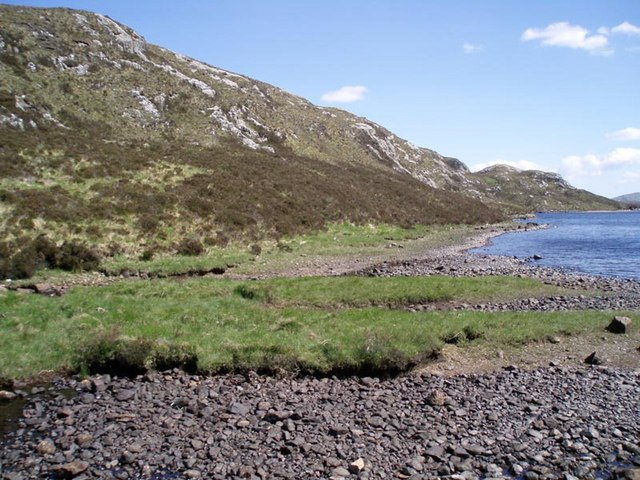
Far eastern end of Uidh Fhearna looking eastback down the side of Loch Veyatie The 'shore' of the loch here was fairly flat before narrowing down towards Uidh Fheàrna

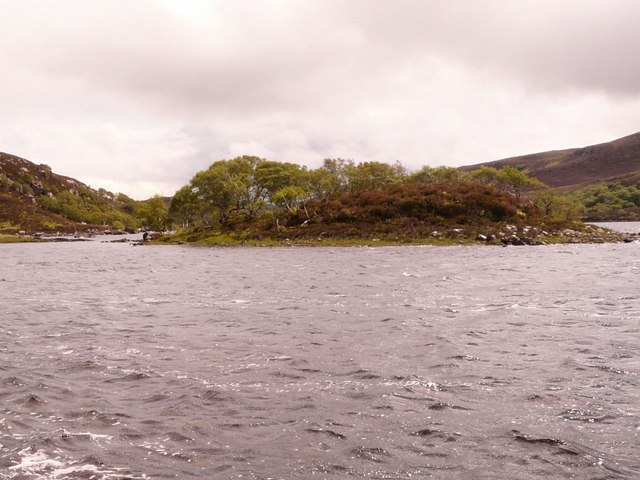
Unnamed micro island on Loch Veyatie

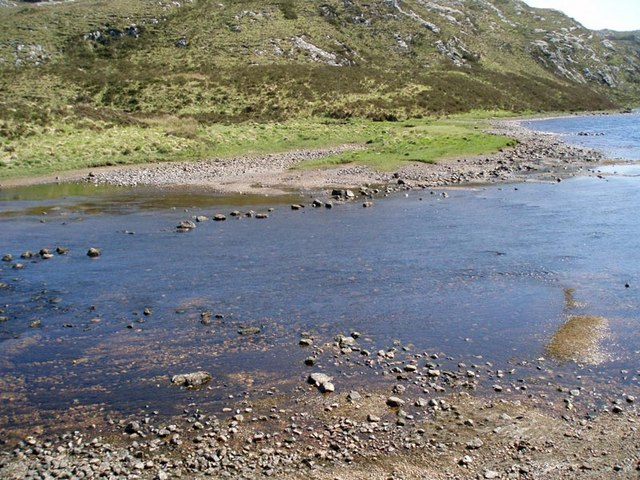
Loch shallows

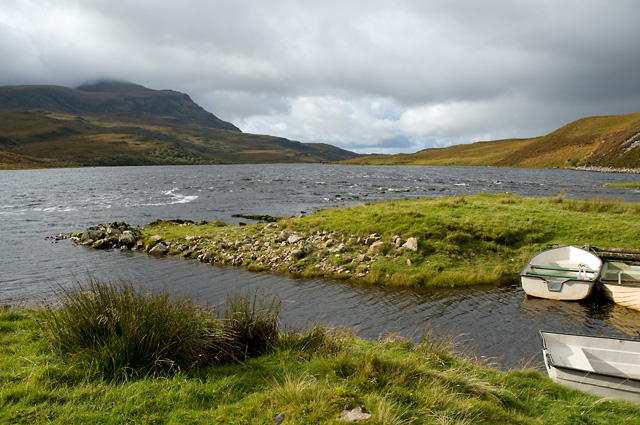
View of Loch Veyatie with Cùl Mòr in the distance. Note the manmade dock.

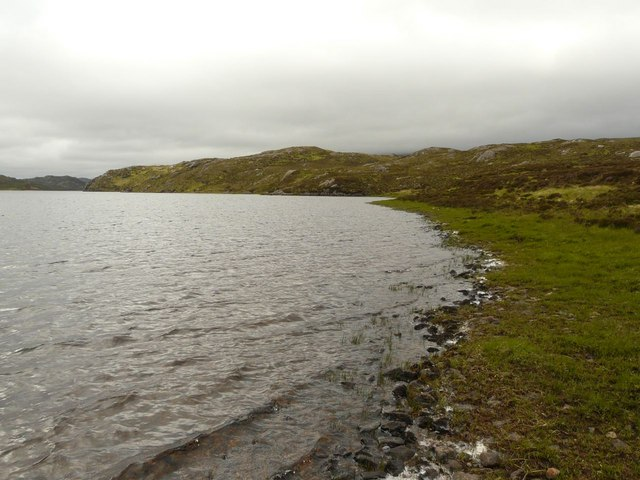
Loch Veyatie, north shore. Less appealing than the beach a few hundred metres to the east.
