= Elphin, Highland =

Coordinates: 58.053231°N 5.030673°W

Elphin: Scottish Gaelic: Ailbhinn
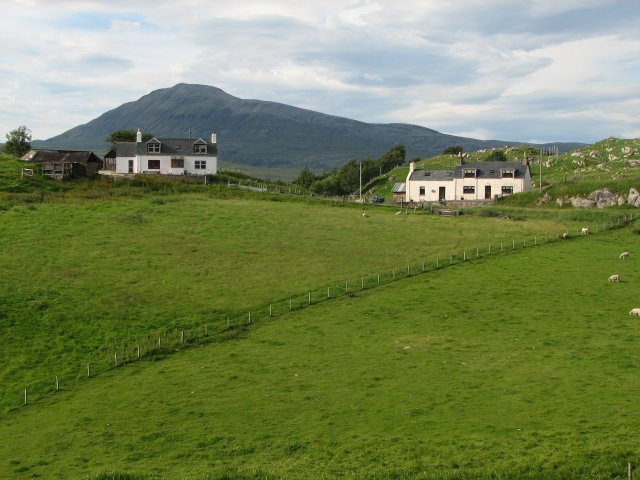

- Location within the Sutherland area
- OS grid reference: NC212111
- Civil parish: Assynt
- Council area: Highland
- Lieutenancy area: Sutherland
- Country: Scotland
- Sovereign state: United Kingdom
- Post town: Ullapool
- Postcode district: IV27 4
- Police: Scotland
- Fire: Scottish
- Ambulance: Scottish

Elphin (Scottish Gaelic: Ailbhinn, which possibly derives from a combination of Norse and Gaelic fjell, "cliff" or "rock", and fionn, "bright") is a crofting township in Assynt, in the Sutherland area of Highland in Scotland. It lies about 15 miles (25 kilometres) north of Ullapool. The village contains a telephone box, a post box, a tearoom, a Scottish Mountaineering Club Hut, Grampian Speleological Group Hut, a small caravan site and many self-catering options. Assynt Primary School closed in 2001, and the building is now a community hall operated by Elphin Ledmore and Knockan Community Association Limited. The township now has its own website, see external links.

Knockan Crag is about two miles (three kilometres) south of Elphin and Loch Veyatie is about 1/2 mile (800 metres) northwest.

== Notable people ==
- Rev Prof G. N. M. Collins DD, twice Moderator of the General Assembly of the Free Church of Scotland was raised in Elphin
