= Assynt =

Area of Sutherland on the west coast of Scotland

Coordinates: 58.215°N 5.0505°W

Assynt: Scottish Gaelic: Asainn
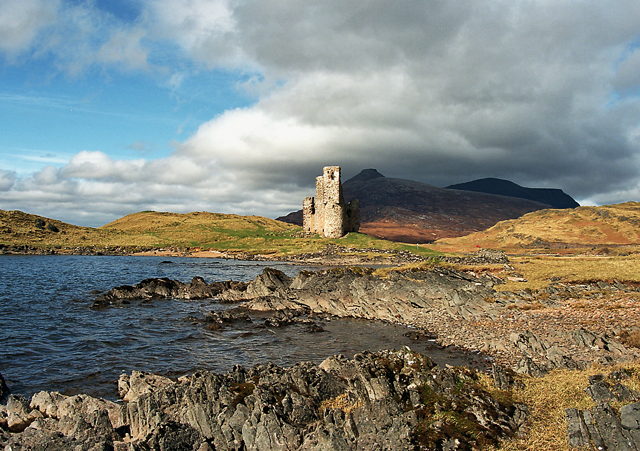
- Ardvreck Castle

- Location within the Sutherland area
- Population: 1,011
- OS grid reference: NC2092
  - Edinburgh: 234 mi (377 km)
  - London: 637 mi (1,025 km)
- Community council: Assynt
- Council area: Highland
- Lieutenancy area: Sutherland
- Country: Scotland
- Sovereign state: United Kingdom
- Post town: Lairg
- Dialling code: 01571
- Police: Scotland
- Fire: Scottish
- Ambulance: Scottish
- UK Parliament: Caithness, Sutherland and Easter Ross
- Scottish Parliament: Caithness, Sutherland and Ross

Assynt (Scottish Gaelic: Asainn [ˈas̪ɪɲ] or Asainte [ˈas̪ɪɲtʲə]) is a sparsely populated area in the south-west of Sutherland, lying north of Ullapool on the west coast of Scotland. Assynt is known for its landscape and its remarkable mountains, which have led to the area, along with neighbouring Coigach, being designated as the Assynt-Coigach National Scenic Area, one of 40 such areas in Scotland.

The western part of Assynt has many distinctively shaped mountains, including Quinag, Canisp, Suilven and Ben More Assynt, that rise steeply from the surrounding "cnoc and lochan" scenery. These can often appear higher than their actual height would indicate due to their steep sides and the contrast with the moorland from which they rise. Many of the most distinctive peaks such as Suilven were formed during the last Ice Age, when they were left exposed above the ice sheet as nunataks, and they now remain as inselbergs of highly eroded Torridonian sandstone sitting on a bedrock of much older Lewisian gneiss. The Moine Thrust runs through the area, and is most visible at Knockan Crag National Nature Reserve, which includes a visitor centre interpreting the geological features of the landscape. In the east of Assynt lies a region of limestone scenery surrounding Ben More Assynt. This part of Assynt hosts the longest cave in Scotland, Uamh an Claonaite, which lies five miles (eight kilometres) south of Inchnadamph. The geological importance of Assynt is reflected in its inclusion in the North West Highlands Geopark.

The name Assynt may derive from an Old Norse word meaning 'ridge end'. There is also a tradition that the name comes from a fight between the two brothers Unt and Ass-Unt, (meaning Man of Peace and Man of Discord). The latter having won the tussle gave his name to the parish. It is celebrated in the poetry of Norman MacCaig.

== Local government ==
For many years Assynt was regarded as a district or province of Scotland in its own right, and was later established as a civil parish. With the introduction of counties it became part of the county of Sutherland. Parishes were abolished for administrative purposes in 1930, and counties were replaced by a system of regional and district councils in 1975, however the boundaries of both were retained for statistical purposes (e.g. census figures and land registration) as well for ceremonial purposes such as lieutenancy. The regions and districts were replaced by unitary councils in 1996, and Assynt now forms a community within Highland council area.

== Ownership ==
As is typical for the Scottish highlands, the Assynt area is divided into a number of large estates, which are in a mix of private, charitable and community ownership. The Assynt Estate, which includes Ben More Assynt and the lands around Lochinver, remains in the hands of the Vestey family, who also formerly owned the North Assynt Estate (see below).

The Quinag estate belongs to the John Muir Trust, a charity that seeks to conserve wild land and wild places.

The Little Assynt Estate, which comprises two of the old townships of Assynt, Little Assynt and Loch Beannach is now owned by Culag Community Woodland Trust, a local trust that seeks to provide employment and training and improvements in well-being for local people, as well as encouraging education about the area's natural environment.

=== North Assynt ===
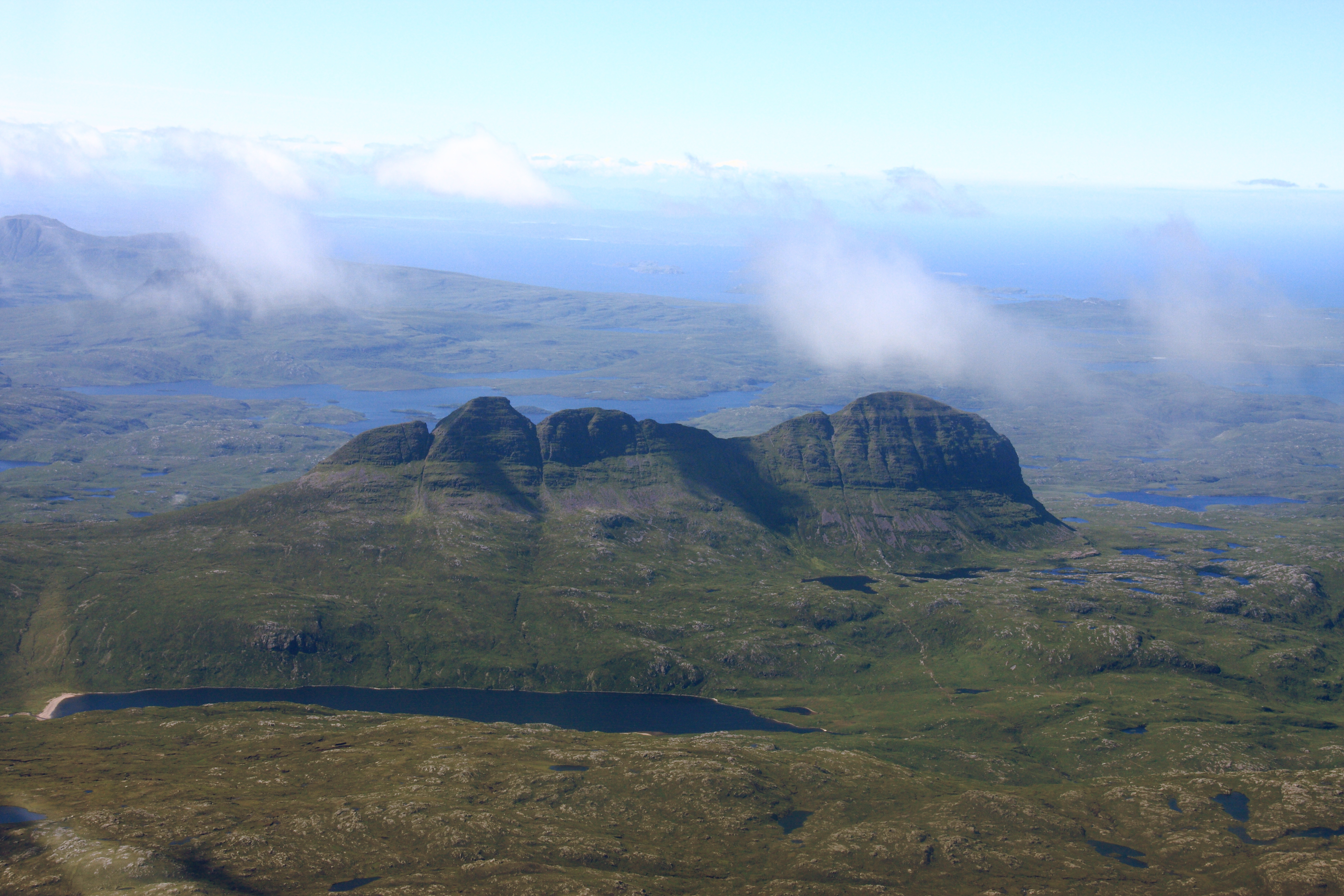
Suilven from the air, showing the steep-sided mountain slopes and rough moorland landscape typical of Assynt.

In 1989, the northwest portion of the Assynt estate was renamed the North Lochinver Estate and put on the market by its owners, the Vestey family. This area consisted almost entirely of crofting land, with 13 crofting townships being set up during the Highland Clearances. The purpose of the sale was to raise money for the owners to buy more hill ground suitable for deer stalking. The estate was purchased by Scandinavian Property Services Limited. Three years later, the company went into liquidation. The North Lochinver Estate was divided into seven lots and put up for sale. The sale was handled by an Edinburgh based estate agent, John Clegg and Co. The proposed break-up of the estate was a cause of concern for the crofters as the boundaries of the lots cut across grazing land, creating the possibility of some crofters having to deal with more than one landlord. The crofters also believed that some of the portions would be directly administered by the owners, rather than a professional factor.

The Assynt branch of the Scottish Crofters Union met on the 6 June 1992, to discuss the sale. There the crofters decided to attempt to raise enough money to buy the estate and run it themselves.

Assynt Crofters' Trust, a company limited by guarantee, was formed to make a bid for the land. Membership of the trust was open to crofters within the estate. The trust aimed to buy the estate and keep it under the control of the crofters, and to develop the area by initiating projects such as house building, job creation and tree planting. Funding for the trust came from many sources. Each crofting family was asked to raise £1,000. Caithness and Sutherland Enterprise, part of Highlands and Islands Enterprise donated £50,000, while Scottish Natural Heritage gave a grant of £20,000. Highland Regional Council donated £10,000. Much of the money, however, came from a public appeal for funds. This appeal raised over £130,000 from 824 individuals. Money came from throughout the United Kingdom, as well as abroad. Political figures such as the local Member of Parliament, Robert Maclennan, Ray Michie, Alex Salmond, Winifred Ewing and Charles Kennedy donated, as did the rock band Runrig. A secured loan of £90,000 was received from Highland Prospect Limited, a company set up by Highland Regional Council to promote investment in the Highlands by providing grants and low-interest loans.

The trust made two unsuccessful bids, of £235,000 and £245,000 respectively. This caused the trust to adopt a more aggressive stance. They threatened to use right-to-buy provisions of crofting law to buy the crofts. This option, requiring legal action, would be expensive and time-consuming; and would deny the crofters complete control of the estate. The option was therefore kept in reserve in order to make the estate less attractive to other potential bidders—compulsory purchase of the crofts would force the new landowners to sell much of their newly acquired land for a fraction of its value. To assist this strategy, the crofters enclosed and divided an area of common grazing land, an action which would give them the option of buying the common land as well as the crofts themselves. Pressure was also exerted on the main creditor of Scandinavian Property Services, the Swedish Östgöta Enskilda Bank, as the trust wrote telling them of their proposed strategy.

On 4 December 1992, the trust submitted a final bid of £300,000. This was accepted after four days. On Monday, 1 February 1993, Assynt Crofters' Trust became the owners of the North Lochinver Estate, which they renamed the North Assynt Estate.

=== Glencanisp and Drumrunie Estate ===
In June 2005 the Glencanisp estate, including the mountains Suilven and Canisp and the neighbouring Drumrunie estate, with the mountains Cùl Mòr and Cùl Beag, were bought by the local community. The Assynt Foundation aims to create local employment and safeguard the natural and cultural heritage for the benefit of the community and future generations, and for the enjoyment of the wider public. The estates of Glencanisp and Drumrunie totalling some 18,000 hectares are managed by the Assynt Foundation on behalf of the Assynt community.

== Nature and conservation ==
Assynt-Coigach National Scenic Area
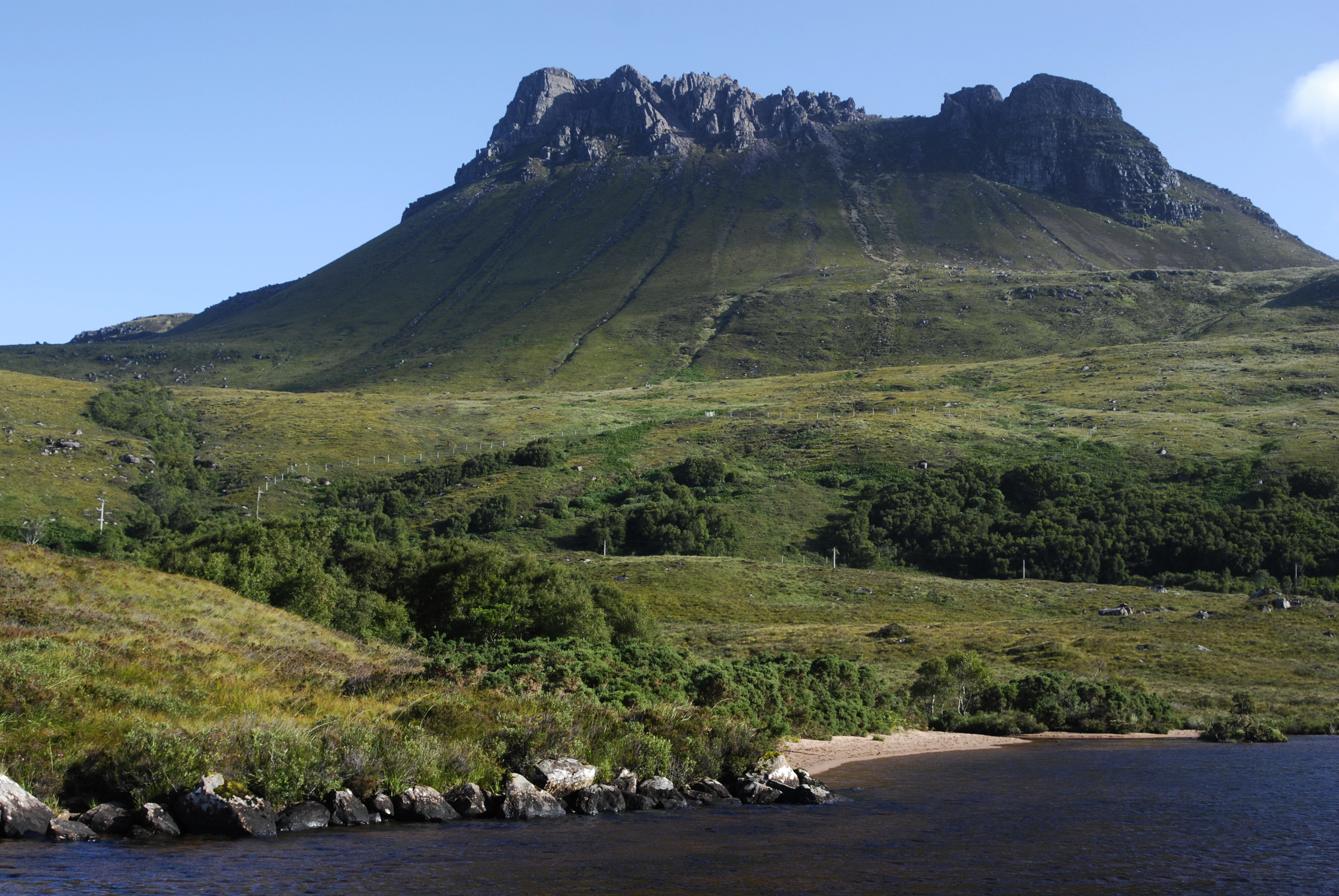
- Stac Pollaidh
- Interactive map of Assynt-Coigach National Scenic Area
- Location: Highland, Scotland
- Area: 1,298 km^{2} (501 sq mi)
- Established: 1981
- Governing body: NatureScot

Assynt has a wide range of habitats, from rocky and sandy shores to high mountains, with areas of woodland, upland heath and dwarf juniper scrubland. The area has a large number of freshwater lochs, which host birds such as black-throated divers. With a highly indented and rocky coastline the area provides excellent habitats for many seabirds, and is one of best places in Europe to see cetaceans such as whales, dolphins and porpoises. Ptarmigan inhabit the mountain areas, where golden eagles may also be seen. Besides the large numbers of red deer, other mammals seen in Assynt include mountain hares, water voles, otters and pipistrelle bat.

The Coigach and Assynt Living Landscape Project is a community partnership project which aims to bring environmental and economic benefits to the Coigach and Assynt regions of North West Scotland. The partnership includes landowners (private and community), the local community and charitable organisations, with the Scottish Wildlife Trust being the lead partner. The project is described as an "ecosystem restoration project", and aims to "bring woodland connectivity, species-rich flora and fauna, and economic growth back to the Scottish uplands".

A large part of Assynt, known as Inverpolly, was formerly designated as a national nature reserve but since 2004 the designation has been limited to the area surrounding Knockan Crag. The Inverpolly area is classified as a Special Area of Conservation, one of three in Assynt along with Inchnadamph and Ardvar and Loch a' Mhuilinn Woodlands. Many of the loch and lochans are designated as Special Protection Areas.

== Settlements ==
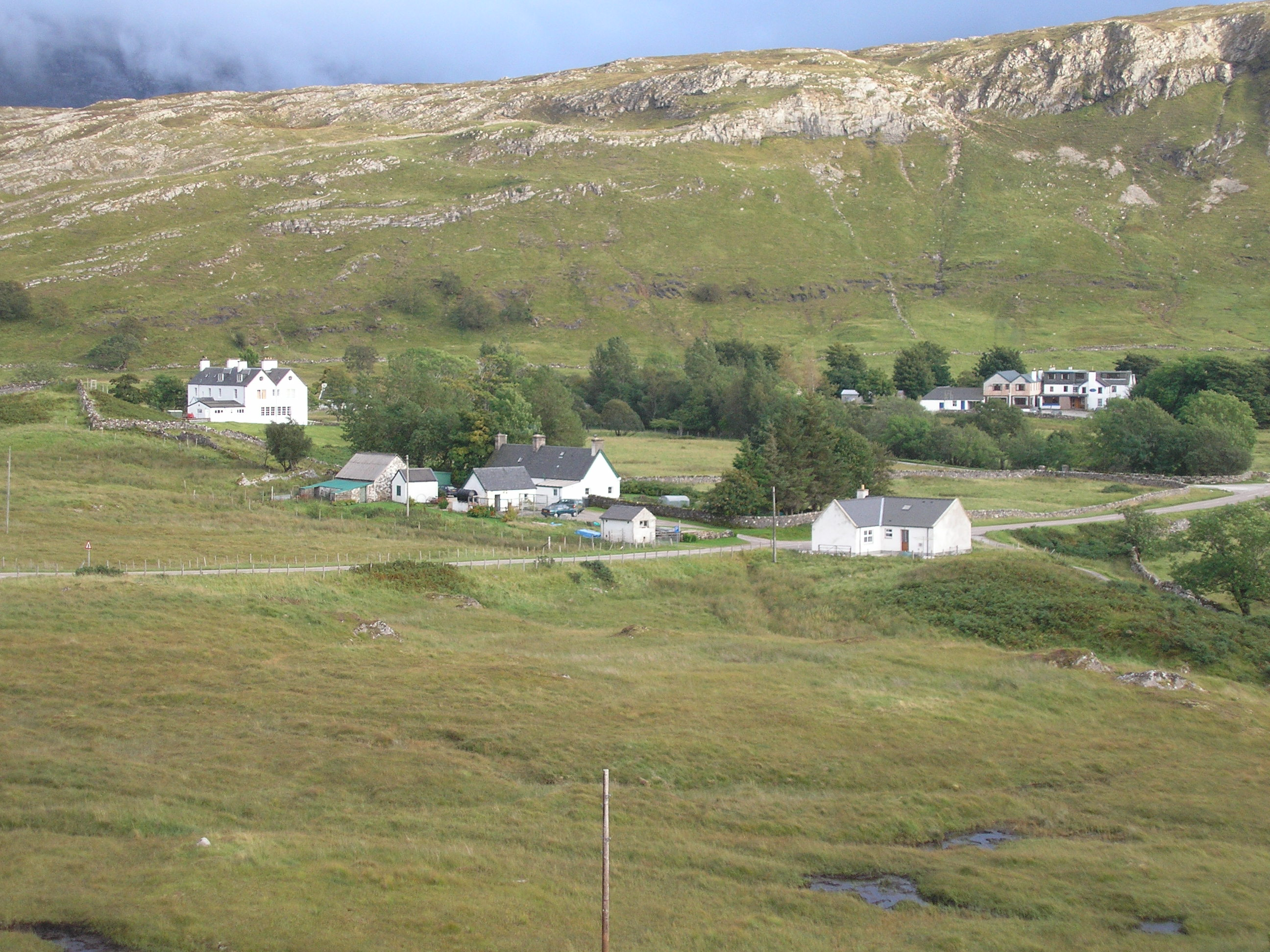
Inchnadamph

Communities in Assynt include:

- Achmelvich
- Ardvar – location
- Balchladich – location
- Clachtoll – location
- Clashmore
- Clashnessie
- Culkein – location
- Culkein Drumbeg
- Drumbeg – location
- Elphin – location
- Glencoul
- Inchnadamph
- Inverkirkaig
- Kylesku
- Lochinver
- Nedd
- Raffin
- Stoer

== In popular culture ==
The Disney+ original Star Wars series Ahsoka used the Glencanisp and Drumrunie Estate as an outdoor location with the permission of the Assynt Foundation.

== Bibliography ==
- MacAskill, John (1999) We have won the land: the story of the purchase by the Assynt Crofters' Trust of the North Lochinver Estate. Stornoway:Acair. ISBN 0-86152-221-4
