= Cùl Beag =

Mountain in Scotland

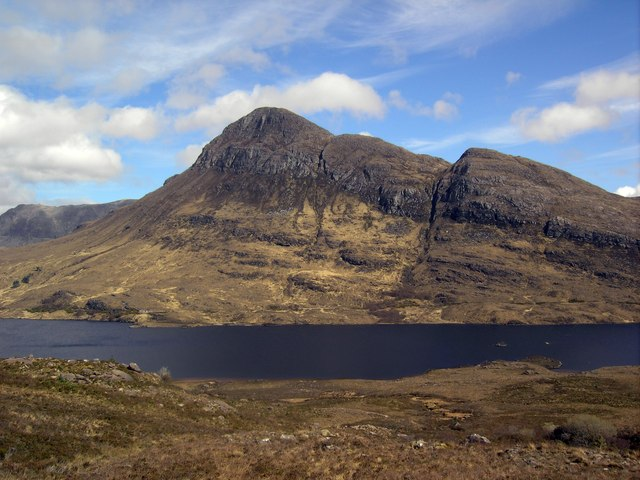
- View of Cùl Beag from the south west, April 2009

Highest point
- Elevation: 769 m (2,523 ft)
- Prominence: 546 m (1,791 ft)
- Listing: Marilyn, Corbett
- Coordinates: 58°01′46″N 5°09′03″W

Naming
- English translation: small back
- Language of name: Gaelic

Geography
- Location within Highland
- Location: Highland, Scotland
- OS grid: NC140088
- Topo map: OS Landranger 15, Explorer 439

Cùl Beag is a mountain in Coigach, in the Northwest Highlands of Scotland. It is 15 km north of Ullapool and lies to the south of Cùl Mòr, and to the east of the better-known but lower Stac Pollaidh.

Cùl Beag is within the Drumrunie Estate, which was purchased in a community buyout in 2005. It is now owned by the Assynt Foundation.
