= Stac Pollaidh =

Mountain in the United Kingdom

Coordinates: 58.04400°N 5.20881°W

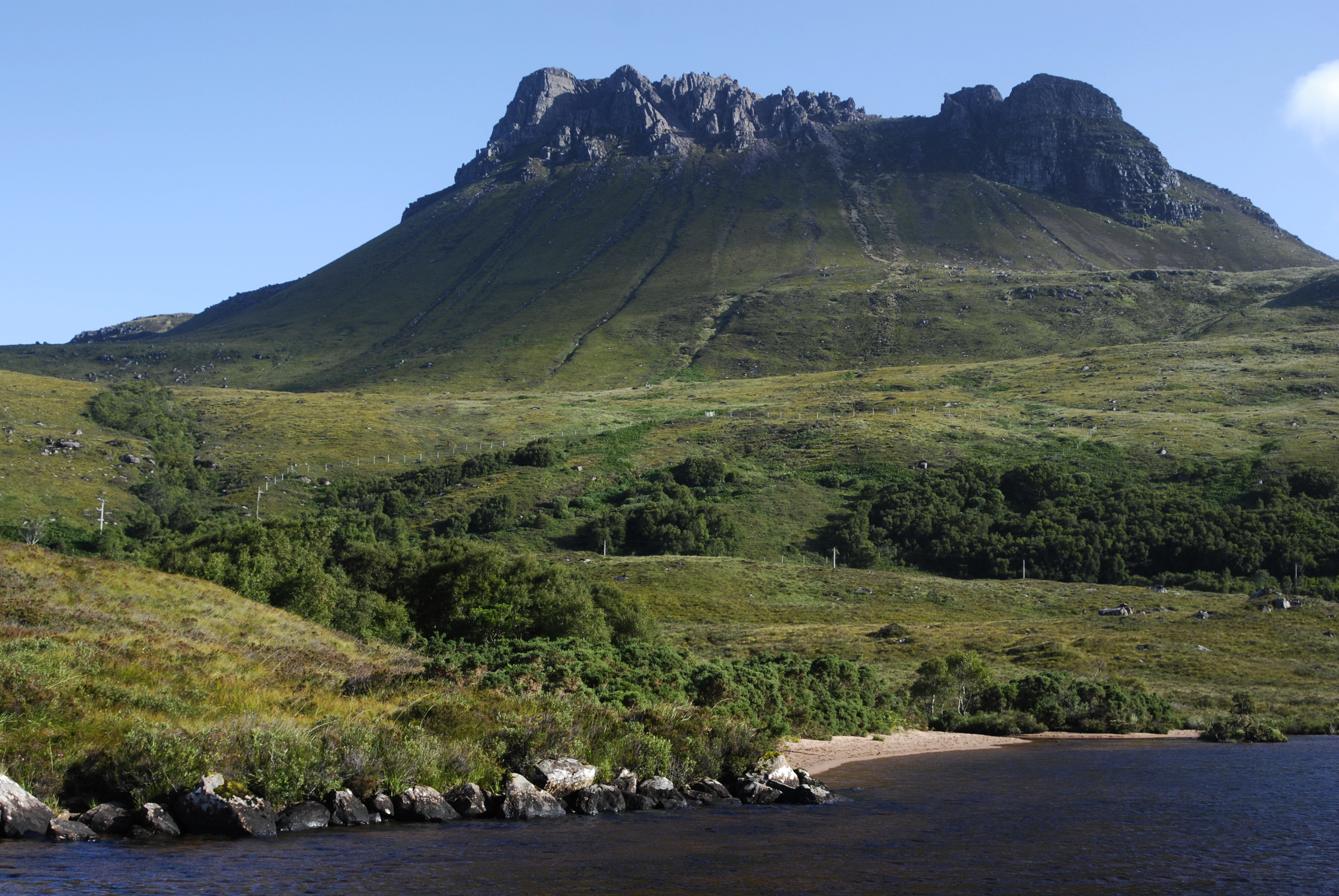

Highest point
- Elevation: 612.4 m (2,009 ft)
- Prominence: 439.8 m (1,443 ft)
- Listing: Graham, Marilyn

Naming
- English translation: The pinnacle of the pool river (Stakkr Pollå)
- Language of name: Norse through Scottish Gaelic
- Pronunciation: /ˌstæk ˈpɒleɪ/

Geography
- Location: Inverpolly, Scotland
- OS grid: NC107106
- Topo map: Ordnance Survey Landranger 15

Climbing
- Easiest route: Scramble

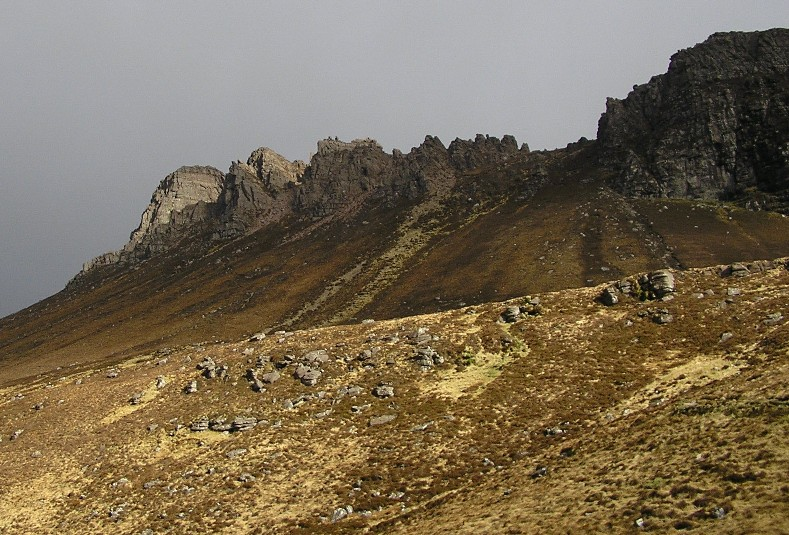
The rocky crest of Stac Pollaidh

Stac Pollaidh (Scottish Gaelic pronunciation: [ˈs̪t̪ʰaʰkˈpʰɔɫ̪eɪ]) is a mountain in the Northwest Highlands of Scotland. The peak displays a rocky crest of Torridonian sandstone, with many pinnacles and steep gullies. The ridge was exposed to weathering as a nunatak above the ice sheet during the last Ice Age, while the ice flow carved and scoured the smooth sides of the mountain.

The modern Gaelic name is a recent invention. The peak is named on the first edition Ordnance Survey maps simply as "An Stac" (the pinnacle) and on later maps as "Stac Polly". The "Polly" element is of Norse origin, derived from "Pollå" meaning "pool river". Due to its relatively low height of just over 2,000 feet (610 metres), fine views and ease of access from a road it has become a very popular peak to climb. It also provides some fine scrambling in the traverse of the summit ridge, including one bad step near the final summit. Consequentially it has suffered from a great deal of erosion, leading to Scottish Natural Heritage constructing a large path.

== Ascent ==
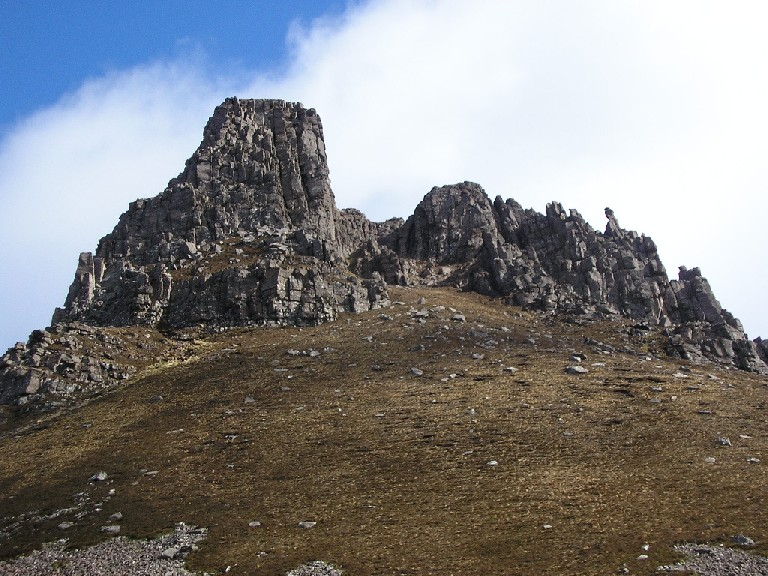
The western summit of Stac Pollaidh requires a scramble to ascend.

Stac Pollaidh can be climbed in less than three hours by any relatively fit person. From the car park on the shore of Loch Lurgainn the path leads directly up, under the spires of the crest. About 200 m from the road the path splits; one may choose either since both meet up on the far side of the hill, from where it is only a short distance to the summit ridge.

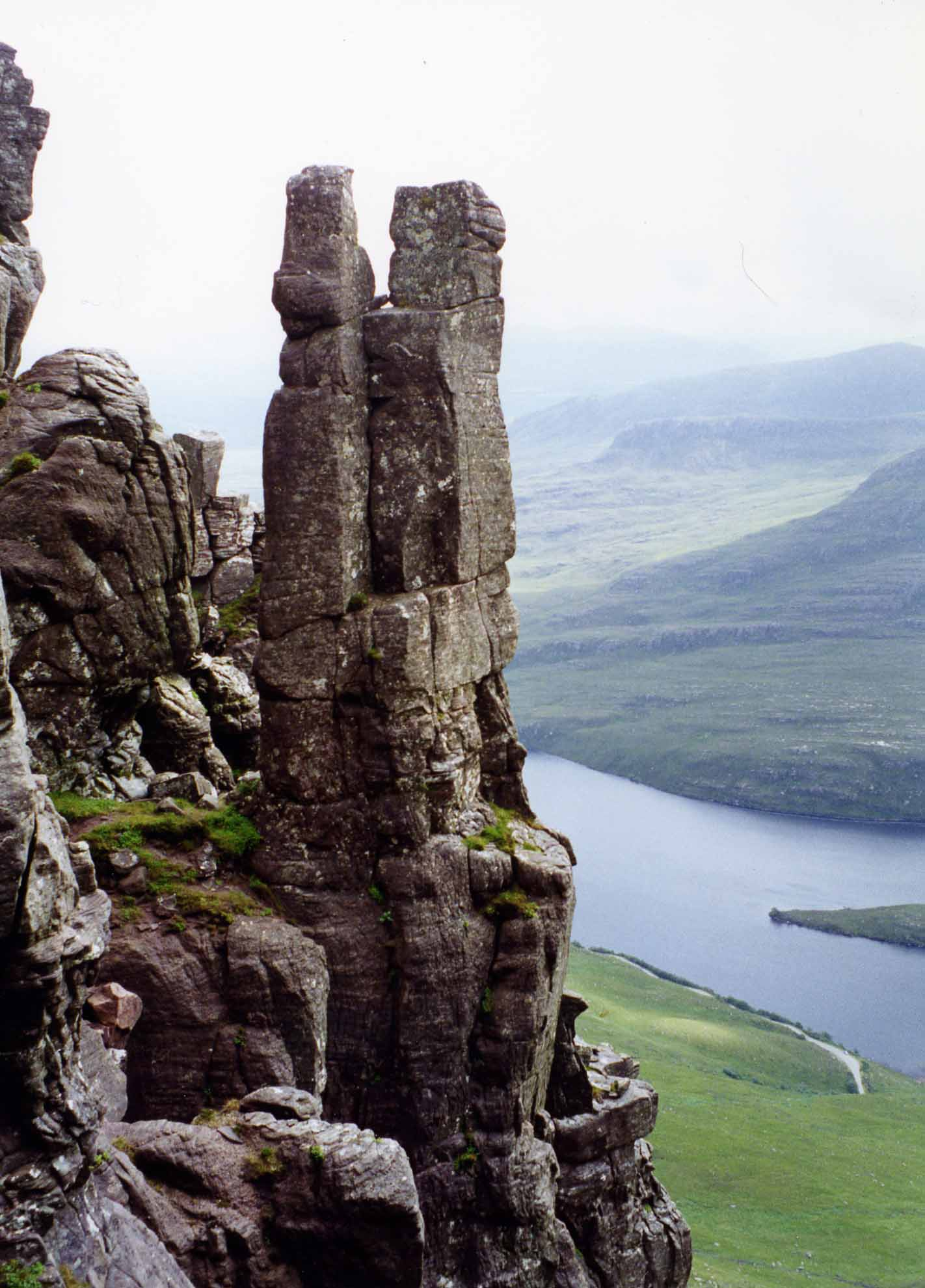
The Lobster Claw pinnacle on Stac Pollaidh which partly collapsed and lost some of its height several years ago.

Once on the ridge the true summit lies about 300 m to the west. However to reach it one must scramble over several rocky pinnacles, and a good head for heights is required. The sandstone pinnacles are impressive and are rated in Scotland as second only to the ones on Quiraing on the Isle of Skye. They carry names such as "The Sphinx", "Tam o' Shanter", "Andy Capp" and "Madonna and Child"; a particularly fine example known as the "Lobster's Claw" partly collapsed several years ago due to natural erosion. The lower, eastern, peak can be reached without any difficulty. From any point on the crest there are excellent views of the wide expanse of the Inverpolly Forest, and of neighbouring peaks such as Suilven. The views of the Minch are breathtaking. Returning via the other path allows for a circular walk of about 3 km.

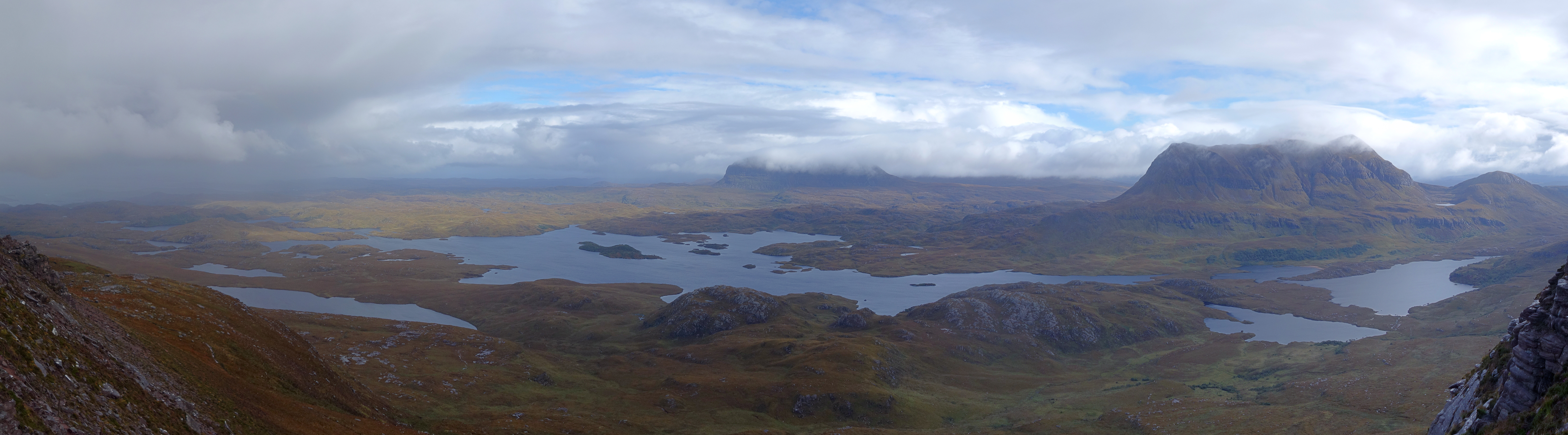
A view from the ridge of Stac Pollaidh looking north, showing Loch Sionascaig in the centre, Suilven beyond the Loch and, on the right, Cùl Mòr

== In popular culture ==
Stac Pollaidh and Suilven star in an episode of Disney+ Star Wars show Ahsoka.

== See also ==
- Canisp
- Suilven
