= Cùl Mòr =

Mountain in Scotland

Coordinates: 58.05798°N 5.11680°W

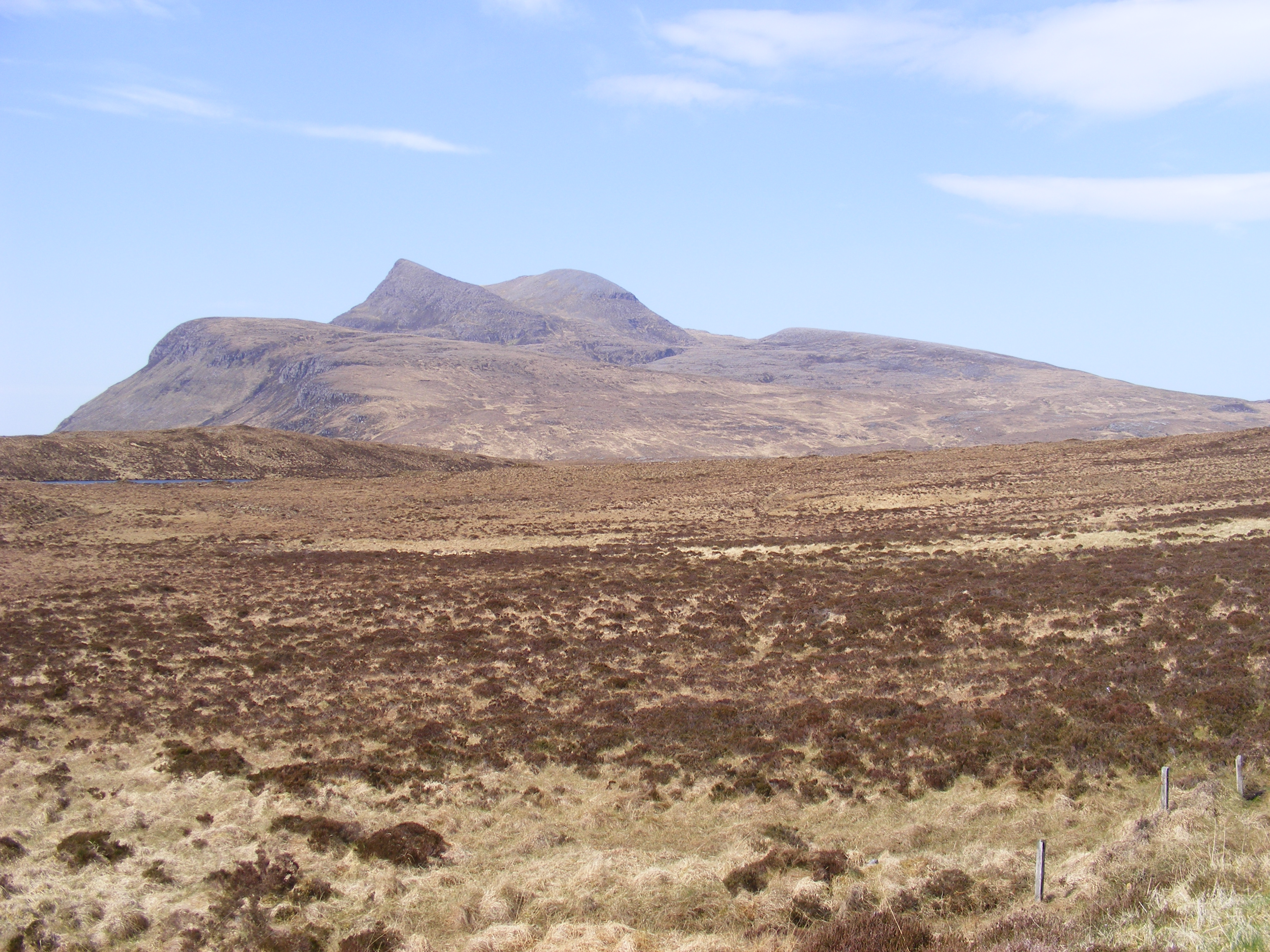
- Cùl Mòr from the main starting point, to the east

Highest point
- Elevation: 849 m (2,785 ft)
- Prominence: 651 m (2,136 ft)Ranked 84th in British Isles
- Parent peak: Beinn Dearg (Ullapool)
- Listing: Corbett, Marilyn

Geography
- Location: Inverpolly, Highland, Scotland
- Parent range: Northwest Highlands
- OS grid: NC162119
- Topo map: OS Landranger 15

Cùl Mòr is a shapely, twin summit mountain in the historic county of Sutherland in the far north west of Scotland whose higher summit is the highest point of Inverpolly. It is almost completely separated from its southern neighbour, Cùl Beag. Despite its higher summit elevation, it is less well known than two of its other neighbours, Suilven and Stac Pollaidh, but being higher, it commands views over these and other neighbours.

== Ascents ==
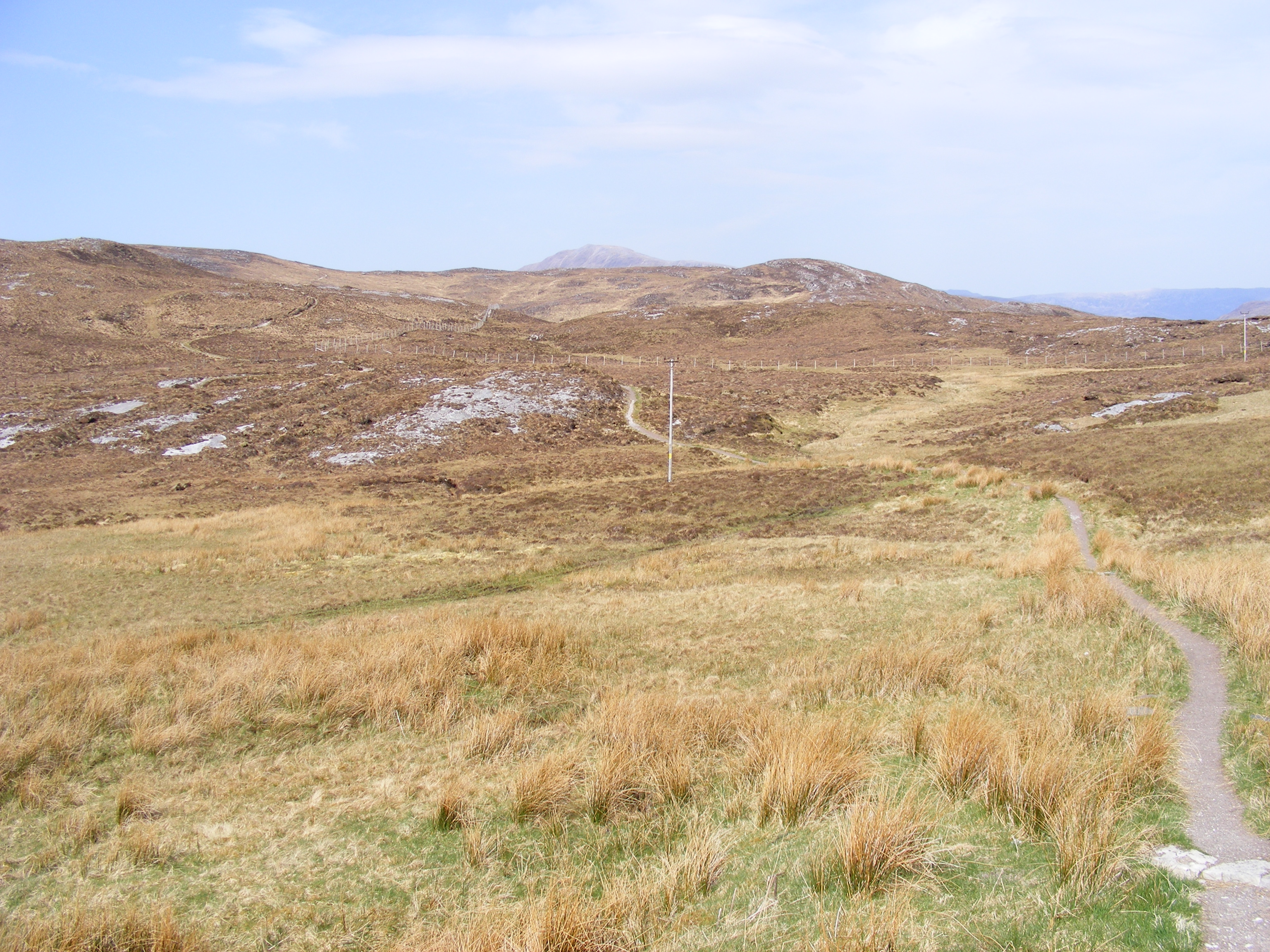
The start of the stalker's path

Cùl Mòr is best approached from Knockan Crag, at NC189095, where there is parking space and from where a stalker's path leads to the foot of the Meallan Diomhain ridge. The route up this ridge is marked by cairns. From the top of this ridge, the most popular route bears right, over a broad saddle, before approaching the summit from the north east. The last part of the ascent is quite steep and involves scrambling over boulders. A slightly longer route is found via the corrie that leads up to the col of Creag nan Calman, to the south west of the main summit.
