= Suilven =

Mountain in Highland, Scotland

- Sùlabheinn
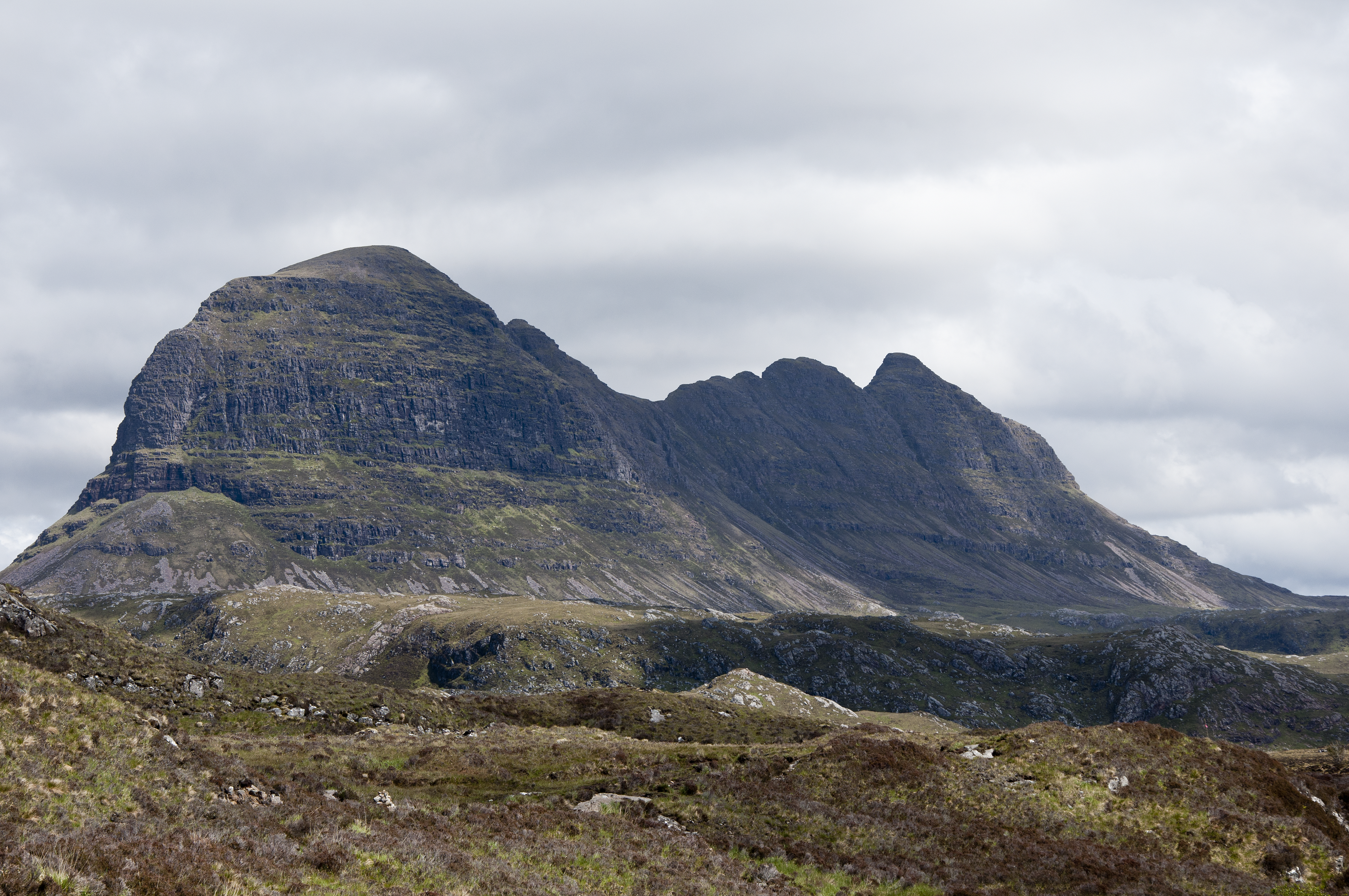
- Suilven

Highest point
- Elevation: 731.4 m (2,400 ft)
- Prominence: 496 m (1,627 ft)
- Listing: Graham, Marilyn
- Coordinates: 58°06′54″N 5°08′13″W

Naming
- Native name: Scottish Gaelic: Sùlabheinn
- English translation: Pillar mountain
- Pronunciation: Scottish Gaelic: [ˈsuləvjeɲ]

Geography
- Location within Highland
- Location: Inverpolly, Scotland
- OS grid: NC153183
- Topo map: OS Landranger 15

Suilven (Scottish Gaelic: Sùlabheinn) is a Graham mountain in Scotland. Lying in a remote area in the west of Sutherland, it rises from a wilderness landscape of moorland, bogs and lochans of the region known as Assynt. Suilven forms a steep-sided ridge some two kilometres (1 1/4 mi) in length. The highest point, Caisteal Liath ("Grey Castle" in Scottish Gaelic), lies at the northwest end of this ridge. There are two other summits: Meall Meadhonach ("Middle Round Hill") at the central point of the ridge is 723.6 metres (2,374 ft) high, whilst Meall Beag ("Little Round Hill") lies at the southeastern end is 659.7 metres (2,164 ft) high.

== Name ==
The name is Viking in origin, coming from the Old Norse súla fjell, meaning "pillar mountain" (with the later substitution of Gaelic bheinn for fjell).

== Geology ==
Geologically, Suilven is formed of Torridonian sandstone, sitting on a landscape of Lewisian gneiss. The surrounding rocks were eroded during an episode of glaciation. Suilven was covered by the last British and Irish Ice Sheet. Prior research described Suilven and many other mountains in Northwest Scotland as nunataks, but cosmogenic isotope dating of mountaintop erratics has since disproved this hypothesis. The flow of ice created the distinctive narrow teardrop plan, while carving and scouring the vertical sides of the mountain.

== Management ==
In 2005 Glencanisp estate, of which Suilven forms part, and the neighbouring Drumrunie estate, were bought by the local community, with the help of the National Lottery and HIE, through a charity they formed called Assynt Foundation. The Assynt Foundation aims to create local employment and safeguard the natural and cultural heritage for the benefit of the community and future generations, and for the enjoyment of the wider public.

== Ascent ==
The most common route of ascent starts from the end of a private road that leads to Glencanisp Lodge, about 1.5 kilometres (1 mi) from Lochinver to the west of the summit. Some public parking is provided just before Glencanisp Lodge by Assynt Foundation. From here, a path leads across undulating moorland towards the steep north side of Suilven and the route up to Bealach Mòr (the Great Bealach or Pass) after about 7 miles. The final pull up to the bealach is steep, and the path has been re-made with many boulder steps. The summit itself is broad and grassy, though it is almost totally surrounded by vertical cliffs.

Another route starts from Inverkirkaig, some four kilometres (2 1/2 mi) south of Lochinver: this route reaches the bealach from the south, passing Kirkaig Falls on the way. One may also start from Elphin, on the eastern side. It is possible to reach the ridge without first climbing to Bealach Mòr from this direction, though very exposed scrambling is required, particularly between Meall Meadhonach and Meall Beag.

All these routes involve a round trip of around 25 kilometres (15 1/2 mi) over rough terrain.

== In popular culture ==
In the 2017 film Edie, a widowed pensioner climbs Suilven to complete a long-held ambition.

Scenes for Disney+'s Star Wars show Ahsoka were filmed in Sutherland, showing Suilven and Stac Pollaidh.

The mountain is mentioned in many of Norman MacCaig's nature poems about his dwelling in Assynt and the Scottish Highlands.

== See also ==
- Canisp
- List of inselbergs
