= Cromartyshire =

Cromartyshire Siorrachd Chromba
- Historic county
- Country: Scotland
- County town: Cromarty

Area
  - Total: 370 sq mi (958 km^{2})
- Ranked 24th of 34
- Chapman code: ROC (as part of Ross and Cromarty)

Cromartyshire (Scottish Gaelic: Siorrachd Chromba) was a county in the Highlands of Scotland, comprising the medieval "old shire" around the county town of Cromarty and 22 enclaves and exclaves transferred from Ross-shire in the late 17th century. The largest part, six times the size of the old shire, was Coigach, containing Ullapool and the area north-west of it. In 1889, Cromartyshire was merged with Ross-shire to become a new county called Ross and Cromarty, which in 1975 was merged into the new council area of Highland.

== History ==
Cromartyshire was anciently part of the province of Ross. Ross had been under Norwegian overlordship in the 10th and 11th centuries, but was claimed by the Scottish crown in 1098. It took many years for Scottish authority to become fully effective in the area. Unlike other areas absorbed into Scotland around that time, such as Moray, Ross was not initially divided into shires. Instead, the area was placed under the nominal authority of the Sheriff of Inverness. By the mid-thirteenth century there were two small shires within Ross, based at Dingwall and Cromarty, to enforce Scottish laws in the immediate vicinity of those two burghs, but the rest of Ross remained under the sheriff of Inverness. The position of Sheriff of Dingwall did not endure, but the Sheriff of Cromarty did, and became a hereditary post held by Clan Urquhart.

The medieval shire or sheriffdom of Cromarty encompassed a single tract on the north of the Black Isle peninsula. It comprised the parish of Cromarty; most of the adjacent parish of Kirkmichael (excluding a portion at Balblair where a ferry crossed the Cromarty Firth to Invergordon); and a single farm in Cullicudden parish. As late as the mid-nineteenth century, the boundary between Ross-shire and Cromartyshire was uncertain on the moor of Millbuie (in the centre of the Black Isle).

Cromartyshire originally bordered Inverness-shire, but in 1504 an act of parliament purported to create the county of Ross-shire covering the rest of the old province of Ross. In practice, that act was not fully brought into effect. It was not until a subsequent act in 1661 and the appointment of the first permanent sheriff of Ross in 1662 that Ross-shire properly functioned as a shire. In 1662, Kirkmichael and Cullicudden parishes merged to form the parish of Resolis.

The feudal barony of Cromarty, whose appurtenant land was coterminous with the county, was purchased from the Urquharts in 1682 by the Mackenzies of Tarbat. They owned scattered lands in Ross-shire, including the barony of Tarbat on the Moray Firth north of the Black Isle. In 1685 Sir George Mackenzie, recently made Viscount of Tarbat and later elevated to Earl of Cromartie, secured two Acts of the Parliament of Scotland transferring his lands in Easter Ross from Ross-shire to Cromartyshire. These were enumerated as:

the barony of Tarbat and all therein incorporated, ... also Little Farness and others his lands within the barony of Delny, together with the lands of Wester St Martins, Easter Balblair and the ferry belonging to George Dallas of St Martins

And:

his lands of Pittonachie, Beneckfield, Avoch, Castleton, Auchterflow, Hauldoks, Killen, Raddery, Balmeechy, Little Suddey and his lands about Chanonry and Rosemarkie

Although this was repealed in 1686 on the grounds that some lands not belonging to Viscount Tarbat had been included, it was re-enacted in 1690 to include only "the said barony of Tarbat and all other lands in Ross-shire belonging in property to the said viscount". The transfers increased the area and rateable value of Cromartyshire by respective factors of fifteen and three.

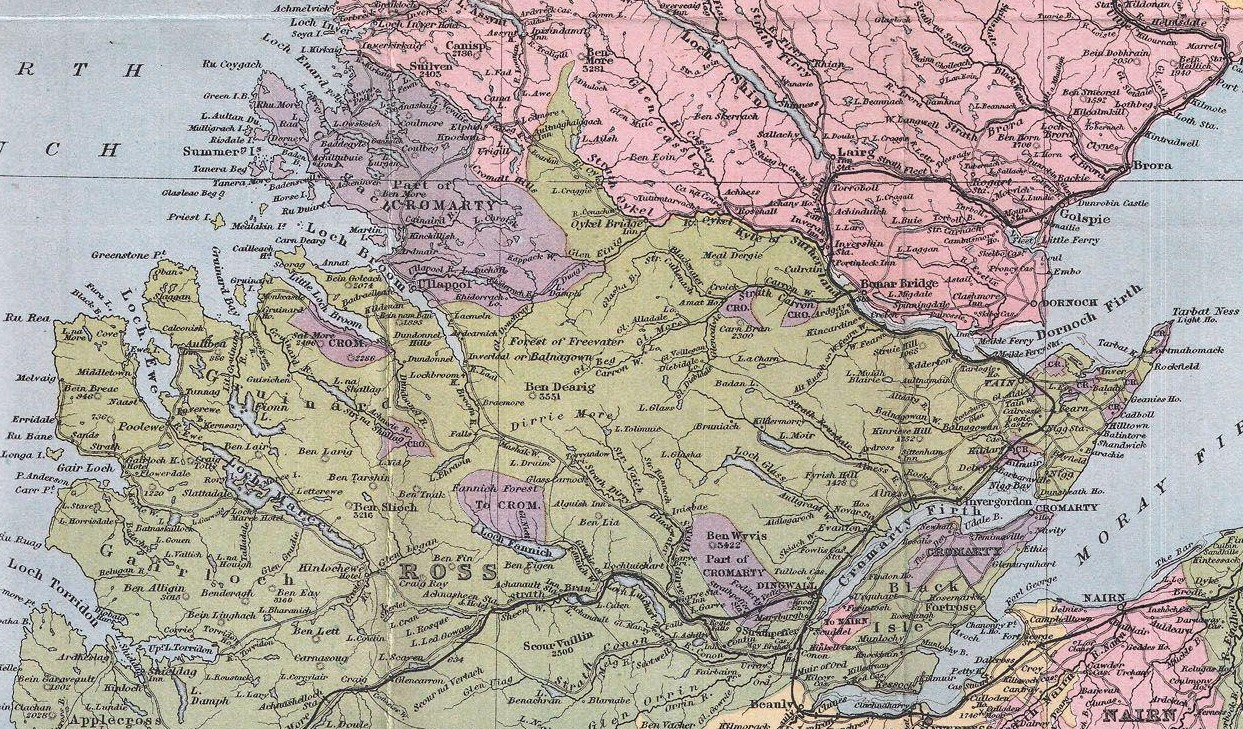
Detail from 1892 map of Scotland, showing Cromartyshire in purple and Ross-shire in green

Cromartyshire was the smallest constituency in the Parliament of Scotland, with only five freeholders electing its two Commissioners in 1703. After the Act of Union 1707, Cromartyshire sent one MP to Westminster alternately with Nairnshire, a nearby small county. Only six of 19 votes on the register at the last election, in 1831, were found to be genuine freeholders.

Following the Jacobite rising of 1745, the government passed the Heritable Jurisdictions (Scotland) Act 1746, returning the appointment of sheriffs to the crown in those cases where they had become hereditary positions, as had been the case for the Sheriff of Cromarty. The scope for a major landowner or clan chief to control the office of sheriff, which had been the major cause of Cromartyshire's exclaves being separated from Ross, was therefore greatly reduced. From 1748 the government merged the positions of Sheriff of Ross and Sheriff of Cromarty into a single position under the Sheriffs (Scotland) Act 1747.

The 1801 census report listed "Shire of Cromarty" and "Shire of Ross" separately, the former including only the old shire and the latter the exclaves. The 1811 census report listed "Ross and Cromarty" together on the ground that it was impractical to separate them. In 1805, responsibility for maintenance of roads in Ross-shire and Cromartyshire was merged. In 1810, the militia was for Ross-shire in some exclaves and Cromartyshire in others. The Scottish Reform Act 1832 merged Cromartyshire's constituency with Ross-shire's to form Ross and Cromarty, returning one MP to Parliament. Police and ratings administration were merged similarly in the Victorian period.

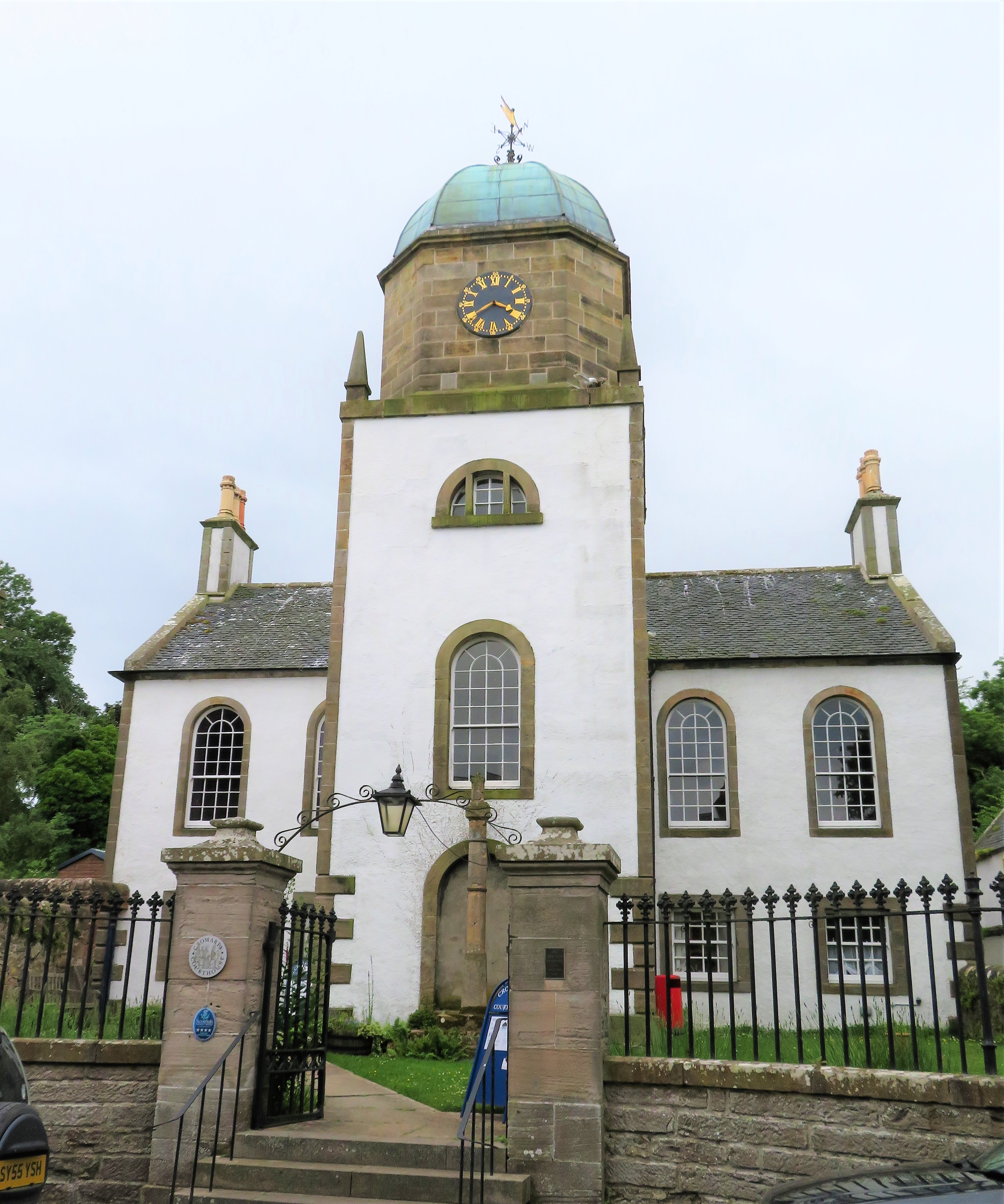
Cromarty Courthouse: County's courthouse, built 1773, which also served as meeting place for the Cromartyshire Commissioners of Supply and the town council for the burgh of Cromarty

Despite sharing a sheriff from 1748, Ross-shire and Cromartyshire remained legally separate counties. They retained separate Commissioners of Supply, and from 1794 each appointed their own lord-lieutenants, with Cromartyshire overseen by the Lord Lieutenant of Cromarty. From 1860 the commissioners of supply for the two counties were directed to work together on delivering some functions, notably relating to prisons.

The Local Government (Scotland) Act 1889 provided that "the counties of Ross and Cromarty shall cease to be separate counties, and shall be united for all purposes whatsoever, under the name of the county of Ross and Cromarty." The new county of Ross and Cromarty came into being from the passing of the act in August 1889. The act also established elected county councils, which came into being in May 1890. The 1889 Act also triggered a review of boundaries to eliminate remaining exclaves and cases where parishes straddled county boundaries, which saw Ross and Cromarty absorb an exclave of Nairnshire and a near-exclave of Inverness-shire; the former was the barony of Ferintosh and the latter an exclave of Kilmorack parish around Muir of Ord railway station.

== Geography ==
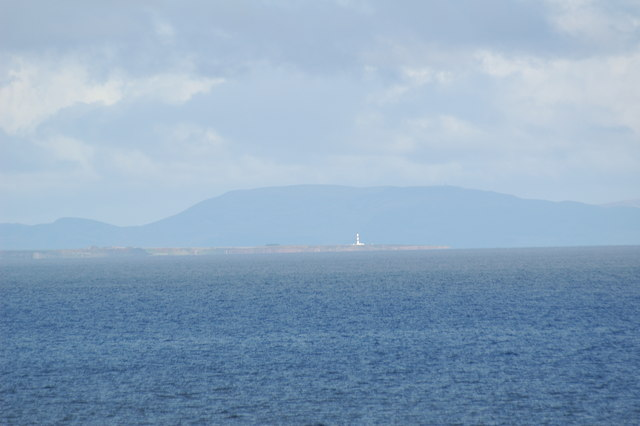
Tarbat Ness from the south across the Moray Firth

Given the scattered nature of the county it is difficult to generalise. The original shire consisted of a portion of the Black Isle peninsula bordering on Cromarty Firth, across which lay the Tarbat peninsula, of which several portions belonged to Cromartyshire, including Tarbat Ness. The interior sections consisted of several enclaves within Ross-shire which were mountainous, remote and sparsely populated.

To the west were various sections around Little Loch Broom, including the southern tip of Gruinard Island. North of Loch Broom lay the largest single section of the county, which contained Ullapool, the Coigach peninsula and a number of small islands in Enard Bay and also the Summer Isles where Loch Broom meets The Minch. This section also contained a number of lochs, including Loch Osgaig, Loch Veyatie, Loch Lurgainn, Loch Bad a' Ghaill, Loch Sionascaig and Loch Achall.

Sources tend to number the tracts added to Cromartyshire at between eight and eleven; however some comprise multiple parcels. In 1807, Alexander Nimmo listed the additions in eight groups with two to six parcels in each.

=== Ordnance Survey list ===
The 1881 index to the Ordnance Survey's first edition lists 22 detached parts, and the original "old shire", all of whose areas are given on the six-inch map. The total measured area of Cromartyshire was 217321.186 acres, or 339.56 square miles (879.5 km^{2}).

No. (Note: "Detached portion no." in OS one-inch and 6-inch maps)	Area (acres)	Name (Note: From Nimmo's 1807 list, unless otherwise noted)	Type	Location (Note: Location is given as general area [Black Isle, Easter Ross, or Wester Ross], then Parish(es), then adjacent feature(s))	Parish (Note: Which 1880s civil parish(es) included the fragment. Subsequent parish boundary revisions are ignored. If one parish is listed, it includes the entire fragment. Unless "all" is listed, only part of the parish is in the fragment, with the rest in Ross-shire or other fragments of Cromartyshire.)	Coords (Note: longitude and latitude (link to external mapping sites))	OS (Note: Sheet number(s) within the Ross and Cromarty sheet series of the first-edition 1-inch OS map on which the fragment is depicted, and relative location within the map-sheet(s))	Settlements	Notes
(Note: The "old shire" is considered the core, from which the other parts are "detached")	20,191.689 (Note: 8674.794 in Cromarty parish (Note: Cromarty parish) plus 11516.895 in Resolis parish (Note: Resolis parish))	Old shire	Barony and six adjacent farms	Black Isle	Cromarty (all), Resolis	57.652°N 4.113°W	94 SE and 93 NW	Cromarty, Jemimaville, Cullicudden	Encloses an exclave of Ross-shire at Balblair. The six farms, annexed for Viscount Tarbat, are: Cullicudden, Craighouse, Torbirchurn, Brae, Woodhead, and Easter Culbo.
1	721.998 (Note: Det pt. 1)	Plaids	Farm	Easter Ross east; Dornoch Firth shore northeast of Tain	Tain	57.816°N 4.035°W	94		Includes the mussel beds in the tidal flats.
2	1,722.235 (Note: Det pt. 2)	Baliacherie	Farm	Easter Ross east; Dornoch Firth shore northeast of Tain	Tain	57.824°N 4.008°W	94		Borders on Morrich More
3	410.106 (Note: Det pt. 3)	Hillton alias Skardy	Farm and mills	Easter Ross east; Southeast of Tain	Tain	57.797°N 4.031°W	94		Mills near Hilton (near Tain)
4	1,585.552 (Note: Det pt. 4)	Lochslin	Estate	Easter Ross east; Between Inver and Loch Eye	Tain, Fearn	57.81°N 3.94°W	94	Inver, Lochslin	
5	1,867.811 (Note: Det pt. 5)	Easter Aird and Easter Tarbat	Barony	Easter Ross east; NW of Tarbat peninsula	Tarbat	57.84°N 3.80°W	94	Portmahomack	Tarbat Ness Lighthouse. Encloses an exclave of Ross-shire at Hilton near Portmahomack
6	832.897 (Note: Det pt. 6)	Meikle Tarrel	Barony	Easter Ross east; Moray Firth coast of Tarbat peninsula	Tarbat	57.806°N 3.848°W	94		
7	1,211.256 (Note: Area is written across two sheets: 1211... in one (Note: Det pt. 7: Sheet 42) and ....256 in the other. (Note: Det pt. 7: Sheet 43))	Cadboll with Mid Geanies	Estate	Easter Ross east; Moray Firth coast of Tarbat peninsula	Fearn, Tarbat	57.78°N 3.88°W	94		Hilton of Cadboll is across the border but Hilton of Cadboll Stone was in this exclave
8	502.969 (Note: Det pt. 8)	Priesthill		Easter Ross east; East of Kilmuir by Tullich	Kilmuir Easter	57.74°N 4.13°W	94	Tullich	
9	5,038.255 (Note: Det pt. 9)	New Tarbat	Estate	Easter Ross east; North of Nigg Bay round Kilmuir	Kilmuir Easter, Nigg	57.735°N 4.066°W	94	Kilmuir, Milton, Kildary	Includes Tarbat House, on the site of Milntown Castle. Balnagown Castle is across the border.
10	117,047.698 (Note: Det pt. 10)	Coigach		Wester Ross northwest	Lochbroom, Kincardine	58°N 5.2°W	101, 102 W	Ullapool; Polglass, Achiltibuie, Polbain, Achnahaird, Altandhu, Reiff, Ardnagoine, Achduart, Ardmair, Rhue, Strathkanaird, Morefield	Also includes the Summer Isles, Isle Martin, and Inverpolly
11	1,766.024 (Note: Det pt. 11)	Amatnatua	Farm	Interior north; south of the River Carron, east of Forest of Amat	Kincardine	57.878°N 4.562°W	102 S, 93 N		
12	2,272.798 (Note: Det pt. 12)	Dounie	Farm	Interior north; south of the River Carron by Srath nan Seasgach	Kincardine	57.88°N 4.43°W	93 N, 102 S		
13	51.689 (Note: Det pt. 13)	Southern tenth (Note: Area of Gruinard I.) of Gruinard Island	Farm (part of Meikle Gruinard)	Wester Ross northwest; in Gruinard Bay	Lochbroom	57.88°N 5.47°W	101 SW		
14	1,876.588 (Note: Det pt. 14)	Meikle Gruinard	Farm (part)	Wester Ross northwest; SE shore of Gruinard Bay	Lochbroom	57.87°N 5.44°W	92, 101		
14a	2,457.315 (Note: Det pt. 14a)	North shore of Little Loch Broom (Note: Tract not listed by Nimmo.)		Wester Ross northwest	Lochbroom	57.90°N 5.33°W	101	Carnach, Scoraig	
15	9,174.142 (Note: Det pt. 15)	Ach ta Skailt		Wester Ross northwest; Shores round the head (southeast) of Little Loch Broom	Lochbroom	57.84°N 5.25°W	92 N, 101 S	Camusnagaul, Dundonnell	Badrallach is over the border.
16	1,274.932 (Note: Det pt. 16)	Ach'-n-ivie	Shieling	Interior; Northwest of Loch na Sheallaig	Lochbroom	57.82°N 5.37°W	92	Lochbroom	
17	361.769 (Note: Det pt. 17)	Feithean Beag (Note: Name on OS one-inch map; tract not listed by Nimmo.)		Interior; between Strathbeg River and Carn a'Bhreabadar	Lochbroom	57.80°N 5.16°W	92		
18	11,064.266 (Note: Det pt. 18)	Nid	Sheep-farm	Interior; northeast from Loch an Nid to the head of Loch Broom	Lochbroom	57.75°N 5.13°W	92	Inverbroom, Achlunachan	
19	1,763.326 (Note: Det pt. 19)	Tollomuick	Farm	Interior, at the head of Strathvaich	Fodderty	57.78°N 4.80°W	93 W		
20	15,857.571 (Note: Det pt. 20)	Fannich	Sheep-farm	Interior; North of Loch Fannich	Lochbroom	57.68°N 5.03°W	92		
21	18,268.300 (Note: Det pt. 21)	Castle Leod or Strathpeffer	Barony	Easter Ross south	Fodderty	57.60°N 4.49°W	93 S, 83 N	Strathpeffer, Achterneed, Fodderty, Bottacks	Includes much of Ben Wyvis and its southern and western slopes

=== Other sources ===
Some places not included within Cromartyshire in the Ordnance Survey map are stated by earlier sources to have been within it. The 1859 edition of the Encyclopædia Britannica asserts that Royston Park (now Caroline Park) outside Edinburgh, the city residence of the Viscount Tarbat, was also considered part of Cromartyshire. Nimmo's 1807 list includes:

- "the mortified lands of the town of Fortrose", two patches totalling less than 50 acres in Rosemarkie parish, which were bequeathed to the burgh of Cromarty. A 1794 account of Rosemarkie parish states that there are two mortifications, but for the poor of Chanonry, not Cromarty.
- Ussie Mills (between Dingwall and Conon Bridge).
- salmon-fishing rights on the River Conon.

== Settlements ==
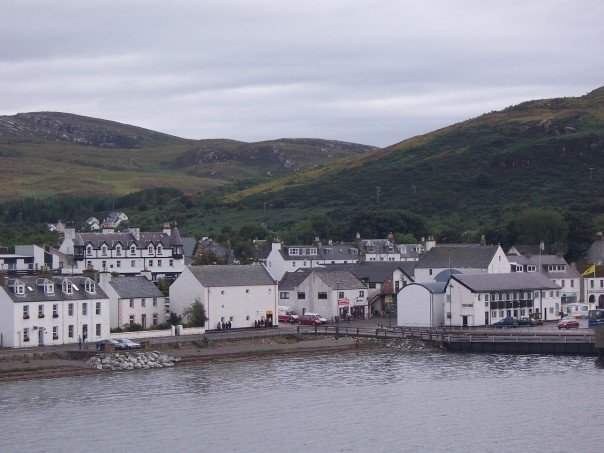
Ullapool

- Achiltibuie
- Altandhu
- Badenscallie
- Cromarty
- Inver
- Jemimaville
- Kildary
- Milton
- Polbain
- Polglass
- Portmahomack
- Strathpeffer
- Ullapool
