= Achduart =

Coordinates: 57.980272°N 5.299201°W

Achduart: Scottish Gaelic: Achadh Dubhard
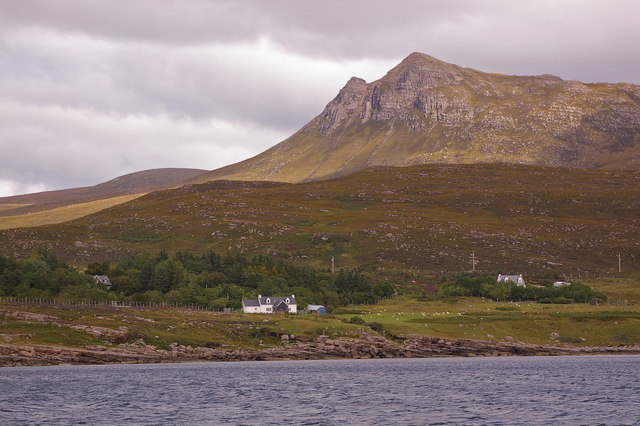
- Achduart with Cairn Conmheall (541 m) behind

- Location within the Ross and Cromarty area
- OS grid reference: NC050037
- Civil parish: Lochbroom
- Community council: Coigach
- Council area: Highland
- Lieutenancy area: Ross and Cromarty
- Country: Scotland
- Sovereign state: United Kingdom
- Postcode district: IV26 2
- Police: Scotland
- Fire: Scottish
- Ambulance: Scottish
- UK Parliament: Caithness, Sutherland and Easter Ross
- Scottish Parliament: Caithness, Sutherland and Ross

Achduart (Scottish Gaelic: Achadh Dubhard, lit. 'black-point field') is a coastal hamlet in Coigach, Wester Ross in northwestern Scotland, now within the Highland council area. It is situated about 4 km southeast of the village of Achiltibuie, at the end of a minor road. A footpath continues on to the hamlet of Culnacraig, then along the coast past Ben More Coigach to Strathcanaird. Achduart has accommodation facilities for tourists, who come for its proximity to the sea and its seclusion and remoteness. There is a hostel in Acheninver, a short distance to the north, formerly run by the Scottish Youth Hostels Association. The name of Achduart comes from the Gaelic for "the field at the black headland". Achduart was part of the Estate of Coigach, Lochbroom, belonging to the Countess of Cromartie.

The dominant geographical feature in the area is Cairn Conmheall, which rises to 541 metres.

== Notable people ==
- Kenny John Macleod -fiddler
