= Sgùrr an Fhidhleir =

Mountain in Scotland

Coordinates: 57.996°N 5.228°W

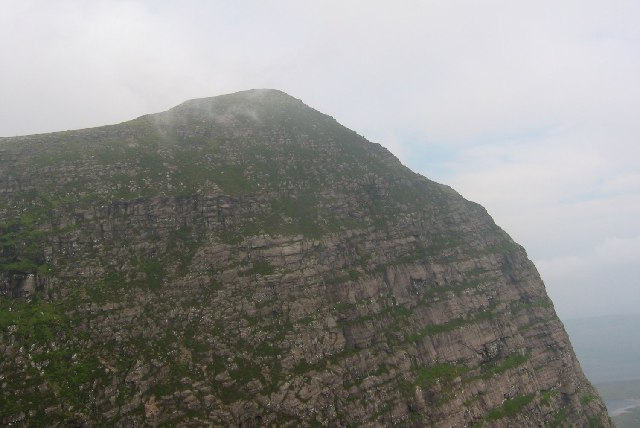
- Sgùrr an Fhidhleir summit

Highest point
- Elevation: 705 m (2,313 ft)
- Prominence: 160 m (520 ft)
- Listing: Graham, Marilyn

Naming
- English translation: The Rocky Peak of the Fiddler

Geography
- Location: Ross and Cromarty, Scotland
- Parent range: Northwest Highlands
- OS grid: NC094054
- Topo map: OS Landranger 15

Sgùrr an Fhidhleir ("Hill of the Fiddler"; 705 m) is a mountain in the Northwest Highlands of Scotland. It lies in the Coigach area of Ross and Cromarty.

Its summit lies atop a spectacular vertical 500m high cliff. It is usually climbed in conjunction with the neighbouring Ben More Coigach. The nearest settlements are Badenscallie (5 km to the west) and other locations along the coast road south from Achiltibuie. The nearest larger settlement is Ullapool.
