= Ben Mor Coigach =

Mountain in Scotland

Coordinates: 57.98606°N 5.22562°W

- Beinn Mhòr na Còigich
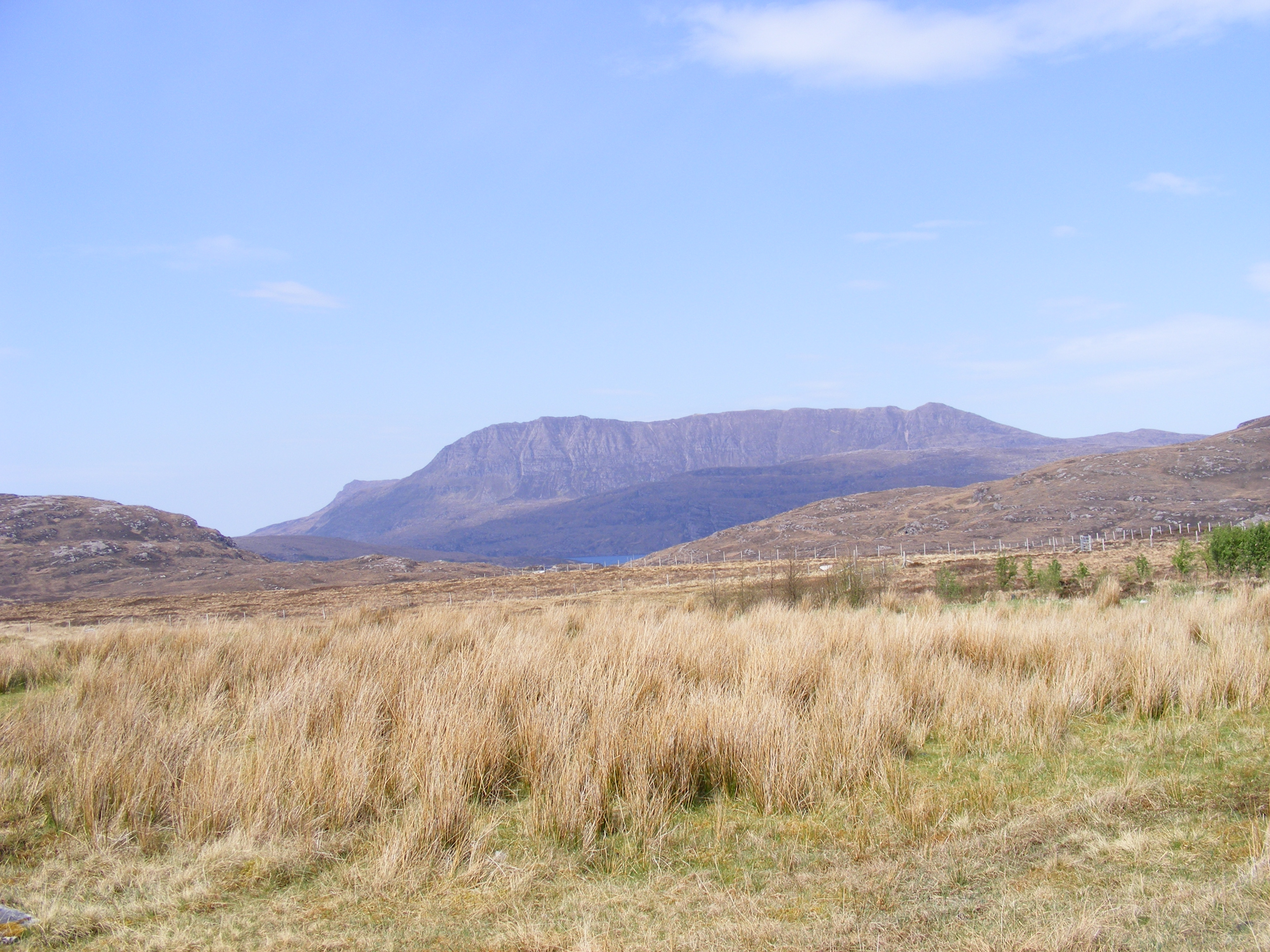
- Ben Mor Coigach from the southeast

Highest point
- Elevation: 743 m (2,438 ft)
- Prominence: 657 m (2,156 ft)Ranked 81st in British Isles
- Listing: Marilyn, Graham

Geography
- Location: Coigach, Ross and Cromarty, Scotland
- Parent range: Northwest Highlands
- OS grid: NC094042
- Topo map: OS Landranger 15

Ben Mor Coigach (Scottish Gaelic: Beinn Mhòr na Còigich) is the highest point along a ridge rising steeply from Loch Broom, in the far northwest of Scotland. It rises above the Coigach peninsula in the county of Ross and Cromarty, 10 kilometres northwest of Ullapool, reaching a height of 743 metres (2,438 ft). Its coastal position, combined with its high topographic prominence to height ratio, provides a spectacular panorama, sweeping from Ullapool across to the Summer Isles and north over Coigach to the distinctive peaks of Assynt, as well as more distant views to Skye and the Outer Hebrides, conditions permitting. The area is a Scottish Wildlife Trust nature reserve.

== Ascents ==
Ben Mor Coigach can be climbed from Blughasary (where there is a car park) to the southeast, or from Culnacraig to the southwest.

From Blughasary, hikers must follow a 4x4 track (shown on the OS map) as far as Loch Eadar dha Bheinn, then pass the outflow east of the loch and head up onto the east ridge. From here the route passes over the Speicein Coinnich and onto a large and flat summit area. Speicein Coinnich is quite exposed but not as steep as it may appear from below.

A more popular starting point, albeit requiring a longer drive in via Achiltibuie, is from Culnacraig. One option follows the line of a long ridge towards the summit of Sgùrr an Fhidhleir (the Fiddler), which is commonly traversed via its south face before the ascent of Ben Mor Coigach from the northeast, or climbed together with Ben Mor Coigach. A more direct but at times steeper route rises east from Culnacraig in just two kilometres to the ridge's southwestern peak of Speicein nan Garbh Choireachan (738 metres). From here hikers follow the impressive and exposed crest of the ridge, drop down to a col and rise up northward to the summit, before dropping to the next saddle and turning west along the spur between the two deep burns (Allt) running back to Culnacraig.

== The Postman's Path ==
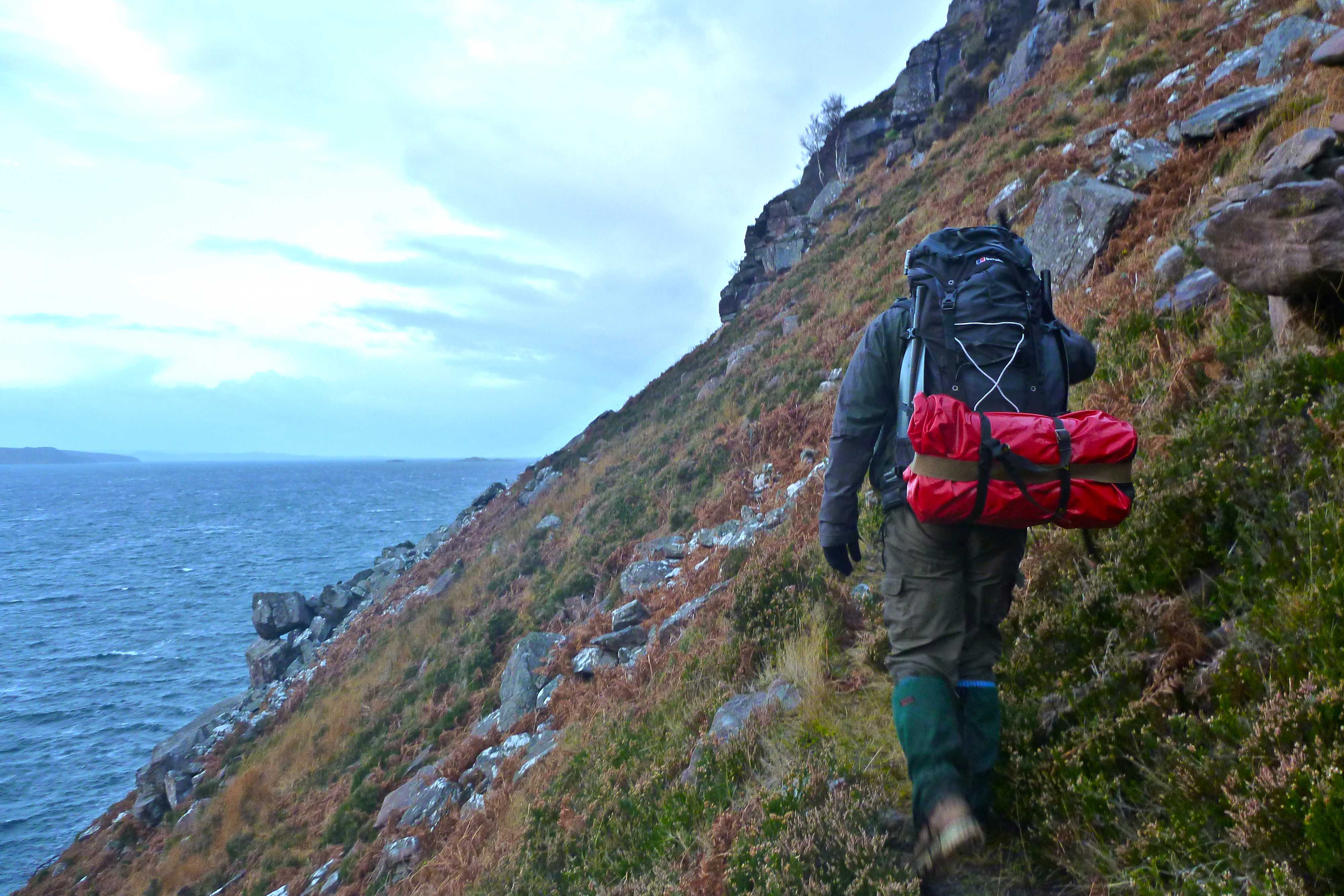

Some walkers may be tempted to use one of the above-mentioned starting points, then descend via the other before completing the loop via part of the "Postman's Path", which follows the coast from Culnacraig to Strathcanaird. Named after the postmen who used it before the hamlets of Coigach were connected to the road network, the path links Culnacraig with Bulghassary over about 11 kilometres (7 mi). Warnings at signposts at each end should not be dismissed. Even a fit walker may struggle to complete this leg in less than four hours. At times the extremely narrow path traverses 45-degree slopes which drop straight into Loch Broom. Some modest scrambling is required in places, and some of these moves can feel exposed. Burn crossings may be difficult or even impossible in spate, in high summer vegetation may obscure the path and at the Strathcanaird end, bogs add to the difficulties. Despite its low altitude, this route traverses steep, exposed slopes, and should be regarded as a true mountain walk. In 2021 the Coigach & Assynt Living Landscape announced that an upgrade to the path had been completed. Apart from a short section of slab paving and a few additional marker posts, as of June 2021 the exposed sections of the track appear to be unchanged.
