= John Kendrick Skinner =

Scottish recipient of the Victoria Cross

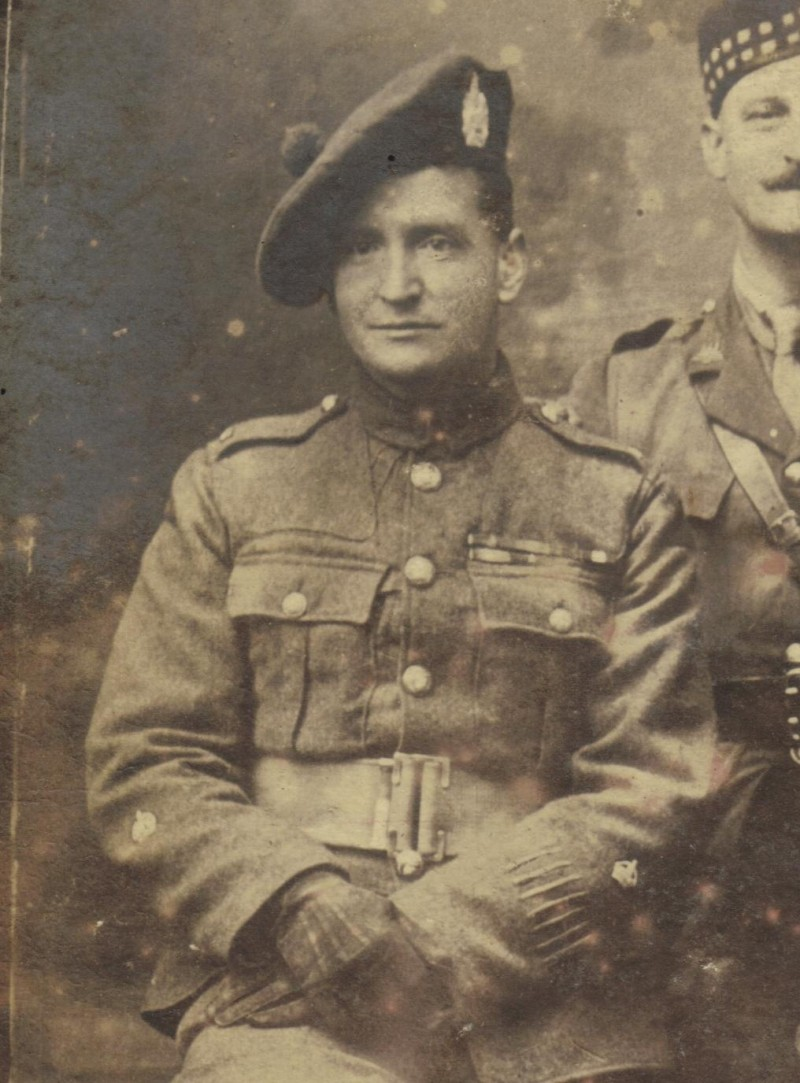
- Born: 5 February 1883; Inver, Highland near Tain, Scotland
- Died: 17 March 1918 (aged 35); Vlamertinghe, Belgium
- Burial place: Vlamertinghe New Military Cemetery
- Military career
- Allegiance: United Kingdom
- Branch: British Army
- Service years: 1899–1918 †
- Rank: Company Sergeant Major
- Unit: The King's Own Scottish Borderers
- Conflicts: Second Boer War First World War: Battle of Mons; Gallipoli Campaign; Battle of Passchendaele
- Awards: Victoria Cross; Distinguished Conduct Medal; Croix de Guerre (France)

John Kendrick Skinner VC, DCM (5 February 1883 – 17 March 1918) was a Scottish recipient of the Victoria Cross, the highest and most prestigious award for gallantry in the face of the enemy that can be awarded to British and Commonwealth forces.

Skinner was born in Shore Street, Inver, near Tain to Walter C. Skinner, a tailor's cutter, and Mary Skinner née Kendrick. He was educated at Queen's Park Higher Grade School and Allan Glen's School in Glasgow.

Skinner was an acting Company Sergeant Major in the 1st Battalion, The King's Own Scottish Borderers, British Army, when he became the recipient of the Victoria Cross for his actions during the Battle of Passchendaele on 18 August 1917 at Wijdendrift, Belgium.

His citation reads:

For most conspicuous bravery and good leading. Whilst his company was attacking, machine gun fire opened on the left flank, delaying the advance. Although C.S.M. Skinner was wounded in the head, he collected six men, and with great courage and determination worked round the left flank of three blockhouses from which the machine gun fire was coming, and succeeded in bombing and taking the first blockhouse single-handed; then, leading his six men towards the other two blockhouses, he skilfully cleared them, taking sixty prisoners, three machine guns, and two trench mortars. The dash and gallantry displayed by this warrant officer enabled the objective to be reached and consolidated.

C.S.M Skinner received the medal from King George V at an investiture in Buckingham Palace on 26 September 1917. Following the investiture he was granted the customary fourteen days' leave after which he was posted to the Reserve Battalion in Edinburgh. A few days later, however, he was seen in the line, having risked a court-martial to return to his men.

He was killed in action at Vlamertinghe, Belgium, on 17 March 1918, when trying to rescue a wounded man and was buried at Vlamertinghe New British Cemetery, Belgium, 3 miles (5 km) west of Ypres, in Plot XVI, Row H, Grave 15. His pallbearers were six fellow-VCs with three others in attendance.

His Victoria Cross is displayed at the Regimental Museum of The Kings Own Scottish Borderers, in Berwick Barracks, Berwick upon Tweed, Northumberland, England.

== Sources ==
- Monuments to Courage (David Harvey, 1999)
- The Register of the Victoria Cross (This England, 1997)
- Scotland's Forgotten Valour (Graham Ross, 1995)
