= Loch Osgaig =

Freshwater loch in Wester Ross, Scotland

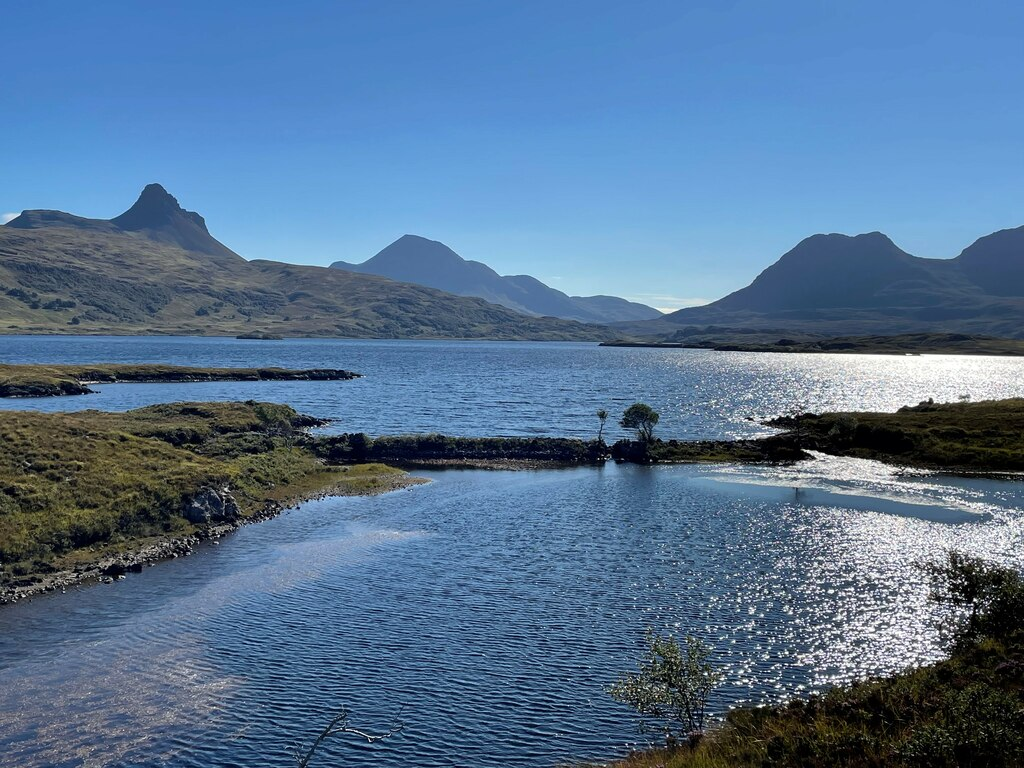
- The top pool of the River Osgaig below Loch Bad a' Ghaill

- Location in Wester Ross
- Location: NC04461204
- Coordinates: 58.05419°N 5.3155°W
- Type: freshwater loch
- Primary inflows: Abhainn Osgaig
- Primary outflows: Unnamed burn into Garvie Bay
- Max. length: 2.4 km (1.5 mi)
- Max. width: 1.2 km (0.75 mi)
- Surface area: 168 ha (420 acres)
- Average depth: 47 ft (14 m)
- Max. depth: 153 ft (47 m)
- Water volume: 846,990,604.059 ft^{3} (23,984,103.0000 m^{3})
- Shore length^{1}: 7 km (4.3 mi)
- Surface elevation: 26 m (85 ft)
- Max. temperature: 54.8 °F (12.7 °C)
- Min. temperature: 50.8 °F (10.4 °C)
- ^{1} Shore length is not a well-defined measure.

Loch Osgaig (Loch Owskeich) is a small remote and deep freshwater loch, orientated on north-west to south-east axis, that is located 1 miles south of Enard Bay and 2 mile northeast of Achiltibuie and immediately north west of Loch Bad a' Ghaill. It is located in the Coigach peninsula in Lochbroom, Wester Ross.

== Gallery ==
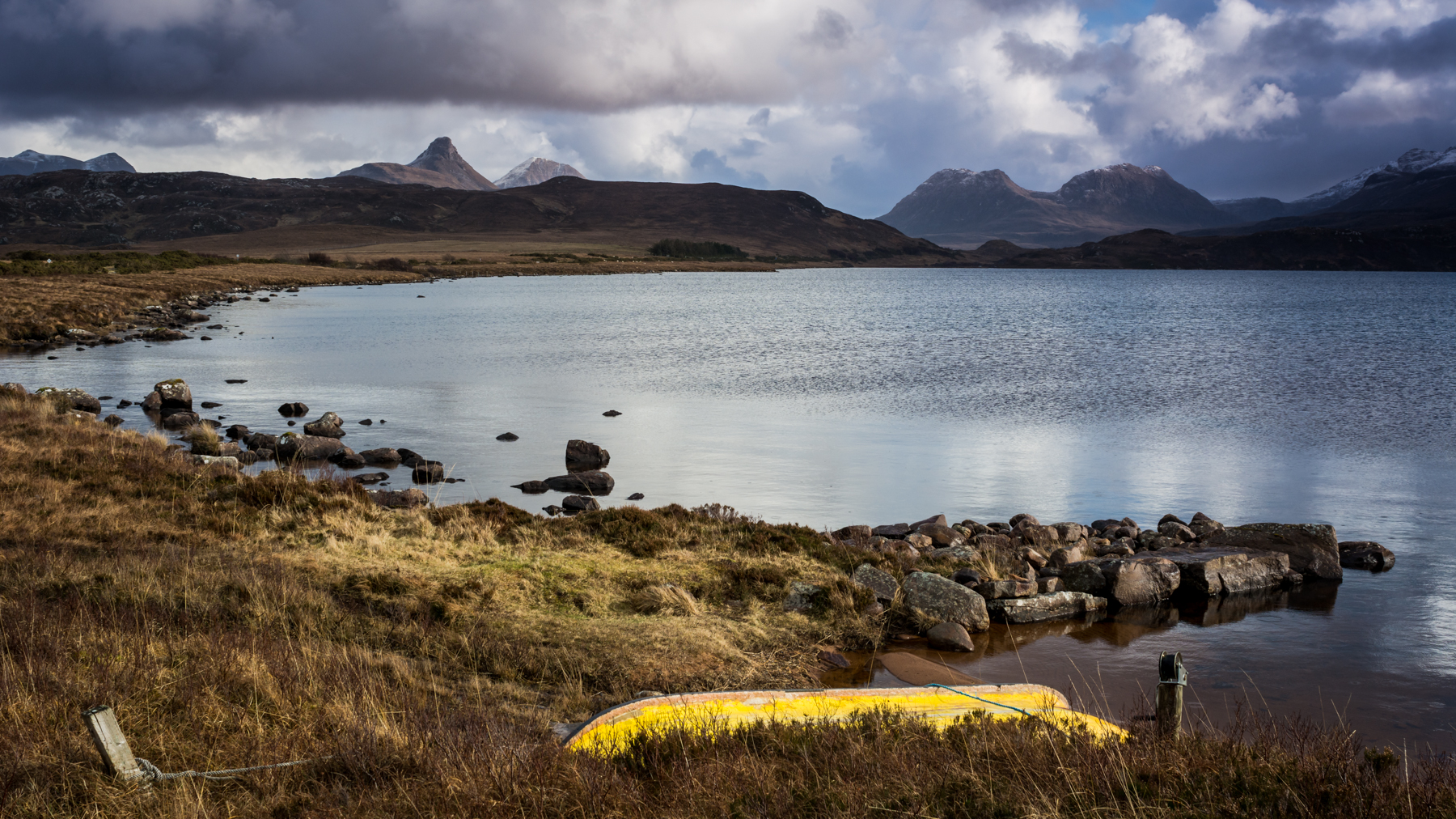
Upturned boat on Loch Osgaig. Looking at the right is the twin peaks of Sgorr Tuath and Sgorr Deas. In the middle is the foreground peak of Stac Pollaidh to the left and Cùl Beag behind. To the left is the peak of Cùl Mòr

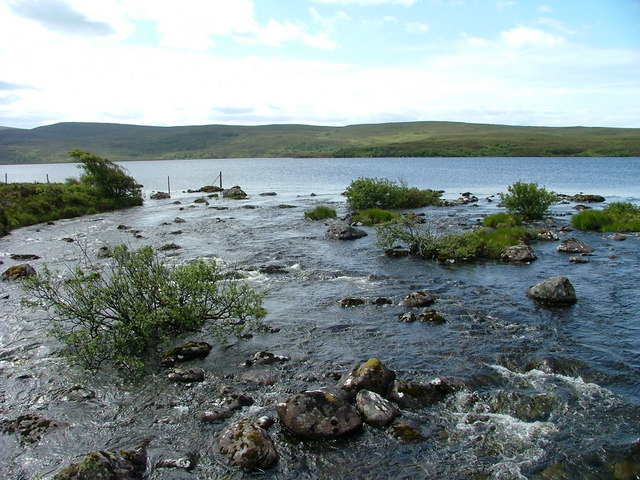
Outflow from Loch Osgaig

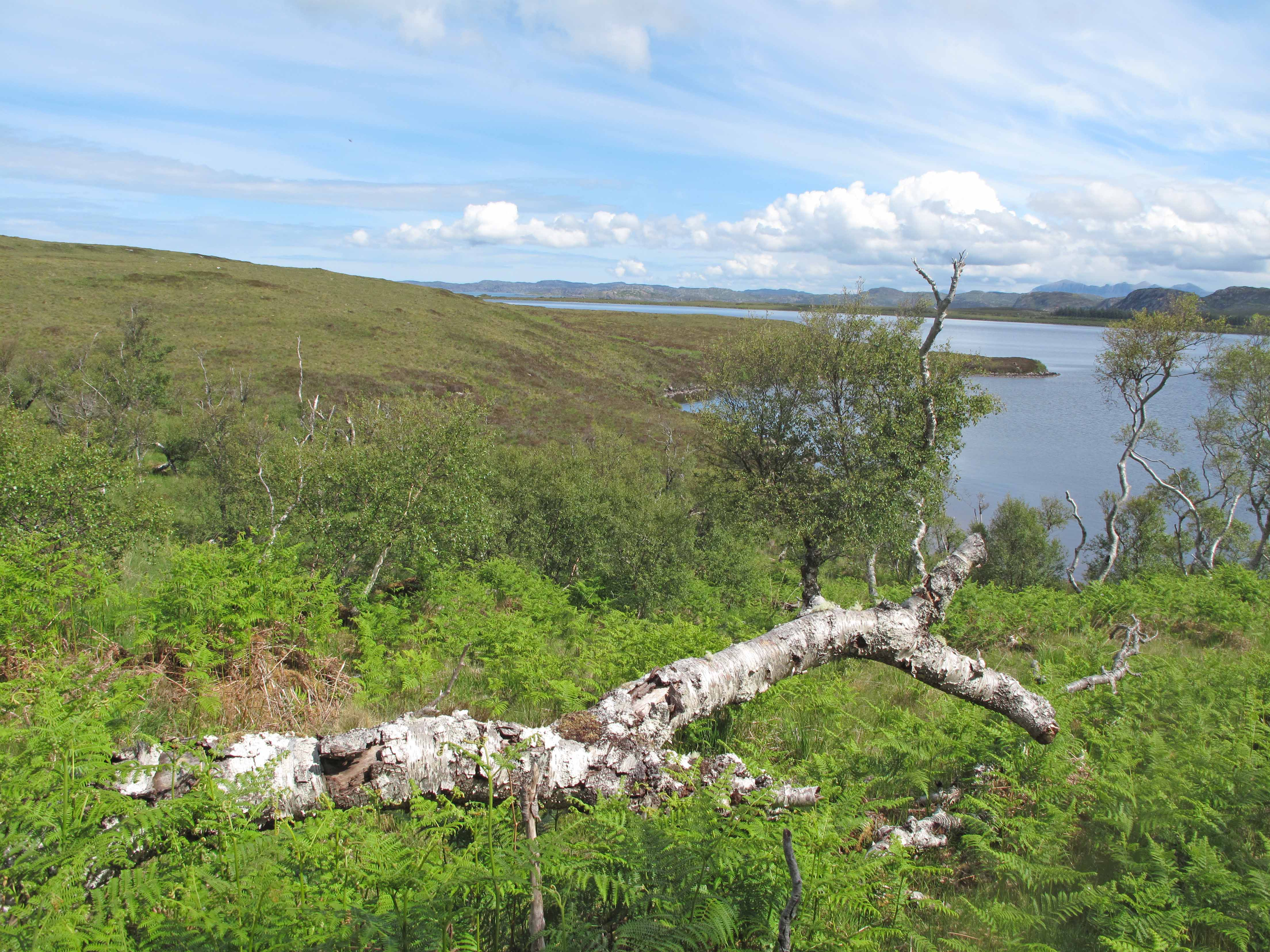
Woodland in the eastern shore of Loch Osgaig

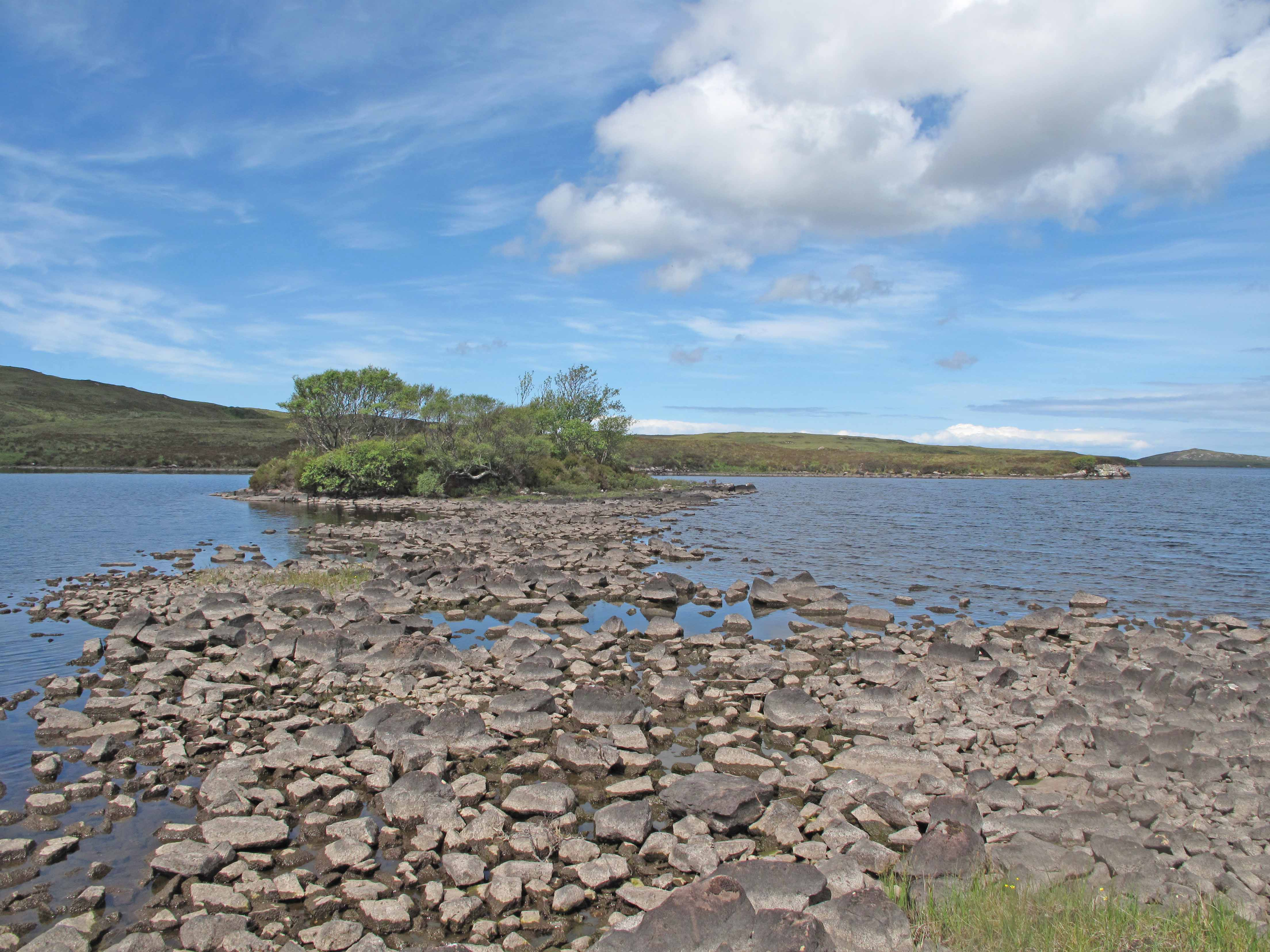
Island on the south-eastern shore of Loch Osgaig
