= 1974 Ross and Cromarty District Council election =

Ross and Cromarty District Council election

| 7 May 1974 | 1977 → |

All 20 seats to Ross and Cromarty District Council 11 seats needed for a majority
| | First party |
|---|---|
| Party | Independent |
| Seats won | 18 |
| Popular vote | 5,812 |
| Percentage | 100.0% |
Council Control after election
Independent

Elections to Ross and Cromarty District Council were held on 7 May 1974, on the same day as the other Scottish local government elections. This was the first election to the district council following the implementation of the Local Government (Scotland) Act 1973.

The election used the 20 wards created by the Formation Electoral Arrangements in 1974. Each ward elected one councillor using first-past-the-post voting.

Ross and Cromarty was a non-partisan district. No political party contested the election and all but two of the 20 seats were won by independents. The remaining two seats were left Vacant.

== Background ==
Prior to 1974, the area that was to become Ross and Cromarty was contained wholly within the larger County of Ross and Cromarty – Ross-shire and Cromartyshire had been two separate counties until they were merged following the implementation of the Local Government (Scotland) Act 1889. Within that were five of the six burghs of the County of Ross and Cromarty (Cromarty, Dingwall, Fortrose, Invergordon and Tain). These were all small burghs so the burgh council had limited powers which included some control over planning as well as local taxation, building control, housing, lighting and drainage with the rest of the local government responsibility falling to the county council.

Following the recommendations in the Wheatly Report, the old system of counties and burghs – which had resulted in a mishmash of local government areas in which some small burghs had larger populations but far fewer responsibilities than some large burghs and even counties – was to be replaced by a new system of regional and district councils. The Local Government (Scotland) Act 1973 implemented most of the recommendations in the Wheatly Report. The central part of the County of Ross and Cromarty which included the five burghs was placed into the Ross and Cromarty district within the Highand region.

== Results ==
1974 Ross and Cromarty District Council election result
| Party | Seats | Gains | Losses | Net gain/loss | Seats % | Votes % | Votes | +/− |
|---|---|---|---|---|---|---|---|---|
| Independent | 18 | | | N/A | | 100.0 | 5,812 | N/A |
| Vacant | 2 | | | N/A | | | | N/A |

== Aftermath ==
Ross and Cromarty, like the other seven districts in Highland, was non-partisan and controlled by independent candidates who won all but two of the 20 seats. The remaining two seats were left vacant. Independents also controlled the regional council which held its first election on the same day. Across Scotland, Labour won the most votes, the most seats and the most councils of any party.
