= Loch Bad a' Ghaill =

Loch Bad a' Ghail
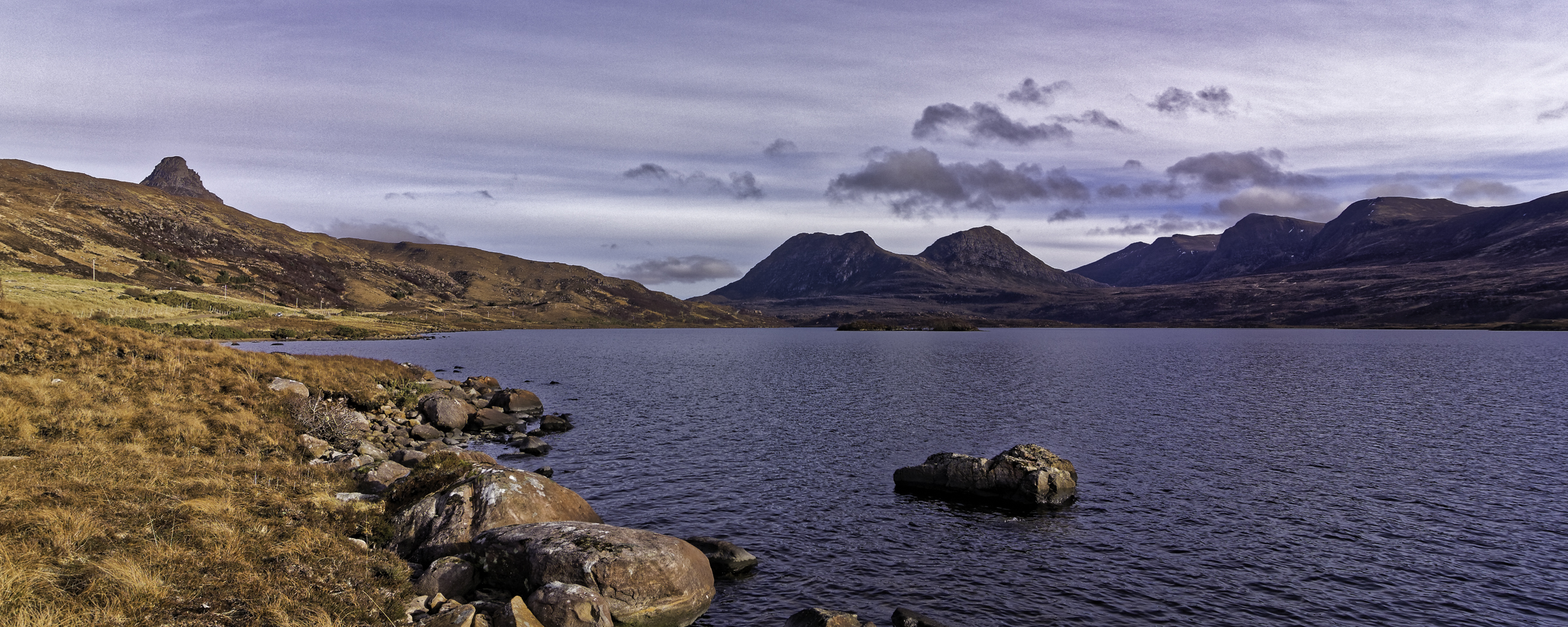
- Loch Bad a Ghaill Looking along the loch towards the twin peaks of Sgorr Tuath and Sgorr Deas

- Location in Wester Ross
- Location: NC08340897
- Coordinates: 58.0485°N 5.2731°W
- Type: freshwater loch
- Max. length: 3.2 km (2.0 mi)
- Max. width: 1.2 km (0.75 mi)
- Surface area: 22 ha (54 acres)
- Average depth: 15.7 ft (4.8 m)
- Max. depth: 180 ft (55 m)
- Water volume: 36,594,399.61 ft^{3} (1,036,238.000 m^{3})
- Shore length^{1}: 3 km (1.9 mi)
- Surface elevation: 54 m (177 ft)
- Max. temperature: 54.5 °F (12.5 °C)
- Min. temperature: 50.0 °F (10.0 °C)
- ^{1} Shore length is not a well-defined measure.

Loch Bad a' Ghaill is a small remote and deep freshwater loch that is located 10 miles north of Ullapool and immediately north west of Loch Lurgainn. It is located in the Coigach peninsula in Lochbroom, Wester Ross. The scenic qualities of Coigach, along with neighbouring Assynt, have led to the area being designated as the Assynt-Coigach National Scenic Area, one of 40 such areas in Scotland. The main settlement in the area, located directly to the north-west is Achiltibuie.

== Geography ==
Loch Bad a' Ghaill is one of three lochs that extend on generally western direction and drains the loch in Enard Bay. The first of these is Loch Lurgainn to the south-east that drains into Loch Bad na h-Achlaise, a small lochan that drains into Loch Bad A' Ghaill that in turn drains into the large Loch Osgaig, which drains through an unnamed river into the small Garvie Bay.

The three lochs are contained in a long valley that is bounded by a series of peaks consisting of large hills and mountains with associated ridges. At the western edge of the loch is the mountain Cùl Beag at 769 m. At the southern, flanking the loch is Sgòrr Tuath, a hill at 587.5m. Moving west along the loch at its mid-section, and to the north is the mountain of Stac Pollaidh. As you move towards the sea, there is a ridge to the south with the small peak of Meall Doire an t-Sidhein at 181m, that gets progressively shallower as you approach Enard Bay.

== Fishing ==
Loch Bad a' Ghaill is very rarely fished due to its remote location and forbidding appearance. It does contain small trout around 8oz as well as sea trout and salmon. Black Zulu, Soldier Palmer and Peter Ross are the most common flies used on the loch.
