= Altandhu =

Coordinates: 58.05468°N 5.40955°W

Altandhu: Scottish Gaelic: An t-Alltan Dubh
- Location within the Highland council area
- OS grid reference: NB989123
- Council area: Highland
- Country: Scotland
- Sovereign state: United Kingdom
- Postcode district: IV26 2
- Police: Scotland
- Fire: Scottish
- Ambulance: Scottish
- UK Parliament: Ross, Skye and Lochaber
- Scottish Parliament: Caithness, Sutherland and Ross

Altandhu (Scottish Gaelic: An t-Alltan Dubh, lit. 'the little black stream') is a small hamlet, overlooking the sea loch, Loch an Alltain Duibh to the west, on the western shore of the Rubha Mor Peninsula, in the Achiltibuie area, in Ullapool, Ross-shire, Scotland, within the Scottish council area of Highland.

Altandhu lies 3 miles (5 kilometres) southeast of Reiff, 2 miles (3 kilometres) northwest of Polbain and about 6 miles (10 kilometres) from the main village of Achiltibuie along the coast road to the east.

Despite its relatively small size, there are a number of interesting local attractions, including the Am Fuaran bar, and Port Beag Chalets. 2011 film The Eagle filmed on location amongst the landscapes surrounding Alandhu, including Achnahaird Bay.

== See also ==
- List of lochs in Scotland
