= 1984 Ross and Cromarty District Council election =

1984 Scottish local election

← 1980	3 May 1984	1988 →

All 22 seats to Ross and Cromarty District Council 12 seats needed for a majority

	First party	Second party	Third party
Party	Independent	Labour	Conservative
Seats won	18	2	1
Seat change	▼1	▲2	0
Popular vote	2,092	557	400
Percentage	68.6%	18.3%	13.1%
Swing	▼31.4%	New	▲13.1%
Council Control before election
Independent
Council Control after election
Independent

Elections to the Ross and Cromarty District Council took place in May 1984, alongside elections to the councils of Scotland's other districts.

== Aggregate results ==
Ross and Cromarty District Election Result 1984
Party	Seats	Gains	Losses	Net gain/loss	Seats %	Votes %	Votes	+/−
Independent	18			▼1		68.6	2,092	▼31.4
Labour	2			▲2		18.3	557	New
Conservative	1			0		13.1	400	▲13.1
Uncontested seat	1			0				
