= Loch Achall =

Lake in Ross and Cromarty, Scotland

- Loch Ach a' Challa
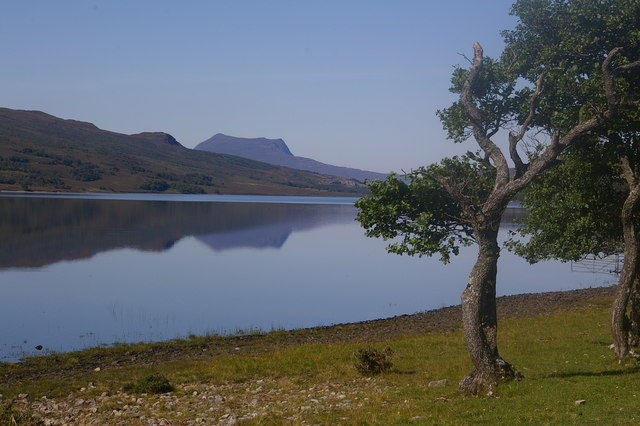
- A view towards the east end of the loch from Stacan Dubha.

- Location within Scotland
- Location: Ullapool, Ross and Cromarty, Scotland
- Coordinates: 57°54′29.83″N 5°4′56.18″W
- Primary outflows: River Ullapool
- Basin countries: Scotland
- Max. length: 3 km (1.9 mi)
- Surface area: 3.36 km^{2} (1.30 sq mi)
- Average depth: 8.4 m (27.7 ft)
- Max. depth: 21 m (70 ft)
- Water volume: 11.4 km^{3} (2.7 cu mi)
- Surface elevation: 80 m (260 ft)

Loch Achall (Scottish Gaelic: Loch Ach a' Challa, meaning "loch of the hazel field") is a freshwater loch, lying 3 kilometres (1.9 mi) northeast of Ullapool, in Rhidorroch, Ross and Cromarty, Scotland.

== Geography ==
Loch Achall is a long narrow loch, 579 m (1,900 ft) at its widest point. It is dominated by the peaks of the Marilyn's Beinn Eilideach directly to the south, at 559 m (1,833 ft) and the peak of Meall Liath Choire to the north east at 549 m (1,801 ft). The loch is fed by the Rivers Rhidorroch and Allt a'Ghiubhais, while the River Ullapool flows from its western end towards Loch Broom.
