= Badentarbat Bay =

Bay in Highland, Scotland

Coordinates: 58.02°N 5.37°W

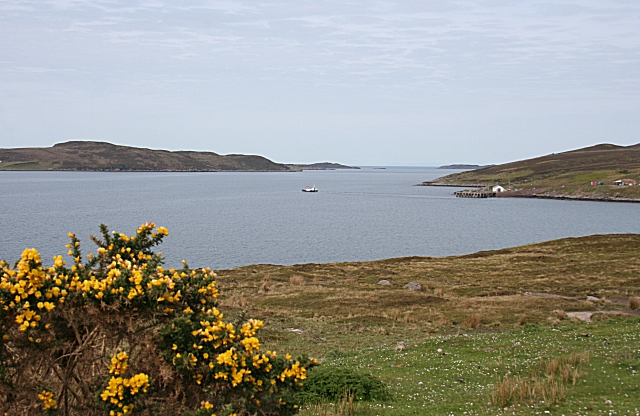
Badentarbat Bay and the island of Tanera Mòr (top left)

Badentarbat Bay, or Badentarbet Bay, is a bay in northern Scotland. The village of Achiltibuie overlooks it. Marian Leven painted scenes of the bay.
