= 1977 Ross and Cromarty District Council election =

1977 Scottish local government election

← 1974	7 May 1977	1980 →

All 20 seats to Ross and Cromarty District Council 11 seats needed for a majority
	First party
Party	Independent
Seats won	20
Seat change	▲2
Popular vote	5,827
Percentage	100.0%
Swing	0.0%
Council Control before election
Independent
Council Control after election
Independent

Elections to the Ross and Cromarty District Council took place in May 1977, alongside elections to the councils of Scotland's other districts.

== Aggregate results ==
Ross and Cromarty District Election Result 1977
Party	Seats	Gains	Losses	Net gain/loss	Seats %	Votes %	Votes	+/−
Independent	20	▲2	0	▲2	100.0	100.0	5,827	0.0
