= Will Maclean =

Scottish artist

Will Maclean MBE is a Scottish artist and professor of art.

== Career ==
Born in Inverness in 1941, Maclean was a midshipman on HMS Conway at Anglesey in Wales (Blue Funnel Line, 1957–59) before attending Gray's School of Art, Aberdeen (1961–65) and then the British School at Rome (1966) as part of a year on a Scottish Education Department Travelling Scholarship. He was an art teacher in Fife schools and taught pupils at Bell Baxter High School in Cupar between 1969 and 1979.

Will Maclean spent another period of time at sea in 1968 as a ring-net fisherman, which led to the Scottish International Education Trust Award bursary in 1973 to study ring-net herring fishing. The resulting Ring-Net Project, a body of over 400 drawings, was exhibited at the Third Eye Centre, Glasgow, from where it toured, and in 1986 at the Scottish National Gallery of Modern Art, Edinburgh, where it entered the permanent collection.

In 1981 he was appointed lecturer at the Duncan of Jordanstone College of Art and Design, University of Dundee, where he remained for fifteen fruitful years, becoming Professor of Fine Art in 1994 and in 2004-2006, senior research fellow and now emeritus professor. He was elected Royal Scottish Academician in 1991 and in 1997 he designed and as part of the team, won the Scottish Natural Heritage Supreme Award for three Memorial Cairns in Lewis. In 1999 he was awarded an honorary doctorate by the University of St Andrews and Civic Trust Award, winning the Scottish Arts Council Creative Scotland Award in the same year. The British Library and Tate Artists Lives Sound Archive made a valuable recorded interview with him in 2005, the year he was awarded an MBE for services to Education and the Arts. He lives and works in Tayport, Fife with his wife, the artist Marian Leven. In 2008 he was made an honorary fellow of the University of the Highlands and in 2009 he received an honorary doctorate of letters from the University of Aberdeen.

Maclean has exhibited widely since 1967. Solo exhibitions have included The Ring-Net, Third Eye Centre, Glasgow and tour (1978); Runkel-Hue-Williams, London (1990); Retrospective Exhibition, Talbot Rice Gallery, Edinburgh and tour (1992) with accompanying monograph Symbols of Survival; a major solo show, Driftworks at Dundee Contemporary Arts, 2001, and exhibitions with Art First, London, since 1994. His most recent exhibition being the 2018 show "Narratives" - The Fine Art Society in Edinburgh. His previous exhibition with Art First in Eastcastle Street, London, was in 2014, "Gleaned and Gathered". In 2015 his touring show, "Veering Westerly " launched at An Lanntair in Stornoway, Isle of Lewis. In 2011 he was given an exhibition by the Fleming - Wyfold Foundation in London, "Collected Works: 1970 - 2010. In 1999 his exhibition "Cardinal Points" was hosted by the Museum of North Dakota, Grand Forks, North Dakota USA before touring to Canada to McMaster Museum of Art, Hamilton, Ontario, and Art Gallery of Newfoundland and Labrador, St. Johns, with an accompanying catalogue by Laurel Reuter, Museum of North Dakota.

Group exhibitions include Worlds in a Box, Edinburgh City Art Centre and The Whitechapel Gallery, London (1994 95); and Contemporary British Art in Print, Scottish National Gallery of Modern Art, Edinburgh (1995) which featured A Night of Islands, a set of ten etchings published in 1991. A major work was acquired for the new Scottish Parliament building and commissioned sculptures and collaborative works can be seen in Skye, Lewis and elsewhere in Scotland.

Recent sculptural commissions include the piece "Waterlines" (commissioned by the University of Aberdeen and installed in the square facing the new library there) and the Suileachan Project on the Isle of Lewis (winner of the Saltire Arts and Crafts in Architecture Award 2013), both collaborations with Marian Leven.

The critic and writer Duncan Macmillan writes in his introduction to the monograph on Maclean, Symbols of Survival: "Will Maclean is one of the outstanding artists of his generation in Scotland... his art is rooted in his knowledge of the highlands, the Highland people and their history and in his own early associations with sailors and the sea. This makes it relevant and immediately accessible, yet it remains uncompromisingly modern in its forms and concerns." His work is in public collections including Arts Council of Great Britain; The British Museum; Dundee, Edinburgh, and Glasgow City Art Galleries; Fitzwilliam Museum, Cambridge; Scottish Arts Council; Scottish National Gallery of Modern Art; Royal Scottish Academy of Art & Architecture;McMaster Museum, Canada; Yale Centre for British Art, Newhaven, USA. He was recorded for the "Artists' Lives" sound archives by the British Library, shared with Tate.

== Monographs / solo catalogues ==
Will Maclean Sculptures and Box Constructions 1974-1987, Claus Runkel, London, 1987

Will Maclean New Work, Duncan Macmillan, Runkel – Hue-Williams, 1990

Symbols of Survival The Art of Will Maclean, Duncan Macmillan, Forward Sorley Maclean, Mainstream, 1992 and 2002

Will Maclean Selected Affinities, Hunter /Macmillan /Watson /Normand /Macdonald, University of Dundee, 1995

Will Maclean Voyages, Ian Gale, Art First, 1995

Will Maclean Atlantic Messengers, Tom Normand, Art First, 1998

Will Maclean; Cardinal Points, Laurel Reuter, North Dakota Museum of Art, 2000

Will Maclean Driftworks, Katrina Brown /Kim Ness, Dundee Contemporary Arts, 2002

Will Maclean North Sea Archives, Jessica Dubow, Art First, 2005

Will Maclean Different Meridians, Richard Holloway, Art First, London, 2008

Will Maclean Collected Works 1970-2010, Skipwith, Macdonald\ Moffat, The Fleming –Wyfold, Foundation, 2010

Will Maclean Contemporary Artists 2, Tom Normand, University of St Andrews, 2012
