= 1980 Ross and Cromarty District Council election =

1980 Scottish local government election

← 1977	1 May 1980	1984 →

All 20 seats to Ross and Cromarty District Council 11 seats needed for a majority

	First party	Second party
Party	Independent	Conservative
Seats won	19	1
Seat change	▼1	▲1
Popular vote	4,601	0
Percentage	100.0%	0.0%
Swing	0.0%	New
Council Control before election
Independent
Council Control after election
Independent

Elections to the Ross and Cromarty District Council took place in May 1980, alongside elections to the councils of Scotland's other districts.

== Aggregate results ==
Ross and Cromarty District Election Result 1980
Party	Seats	Gains	Losses	Net gain/loss	Seats %	Votes %	Votes	+/−
Independent	19	0	1	▼1		100.0	4,601	0.0
Conservative	1	1	0	▲1		0.0	0	New
