= Reiff, Ross-shire =

Remote coastal crofting and fishing village in Scotland

Coordinates: 58.06793°N 5.44566°W

Reiff: Scottish Gaelic: An Riof
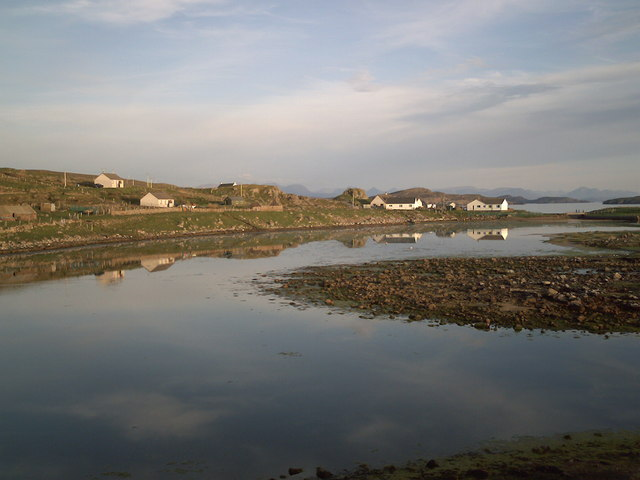
- Reiff in the background

- Location within the Highland council area
- OS grid reference: NB968139
- Council area: Highland
- Country: Scotland
- Sovereign state: United Kingdom
- Postcode district: IV26 2
- Police: Scotland
- Fire: Scottish
- Ambulance: Scottish

Reiff (Scottish Gaelic: An Riof) is a small remote coastal crofting and fishing village, situated on Reiff Bay on the Ruhba Mòr peninsula, in western Ross-shire, Scottish Highlands and is in the Scottish council area of Highland.

Reiff is located 3 miles (5 kilometres) northwest of Altandhu and 6 miles (10 kilometres) northwest of Polbain.
