= Polglass =

Coordinates: 58.01028°N 5.31446°W

Polglass: Scottish Gaelic: Am Poll Glas
- Location within the Highland council area
- OS grid reference: NC042071
- Council area: Highland
- Country: Scotland
- Sovereign state: United Kingdom
- Post town: Achiltibuie
- Postcode district: IV26 2
- Police: Scotland
- Fire: Scottish
- Ambulance: Scottish

Polglass (Scottish Gaelic: Am Poll Glas) is a long crofting township, lying on the north shore of the sea loch, Loch Broom in Ullapool Ross-shire, Scottish Highlands and is in the Scottish council area of Highland.
