= Fodderty =

Coordinates: 57.59922°N 4.45806°W

Fodderty: Scottish Gaelic: Fodhraitidh
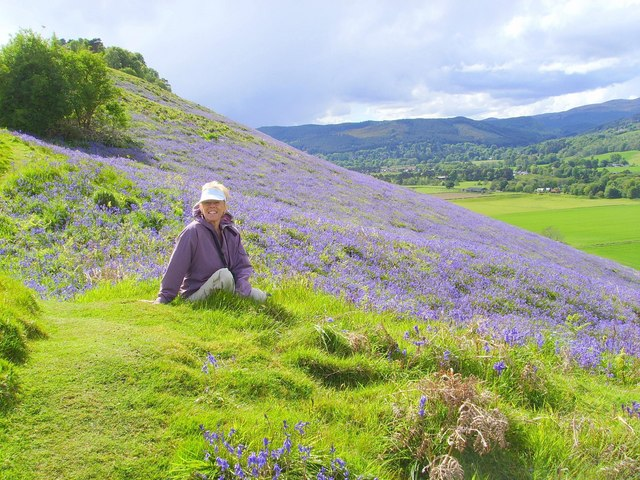
- Bluebell time on Knock Farrel

- Location within the Ross and Cromarty area
- OS grid reference: NH532592
- Council area: Highland
- Country: Scotland
- Sovereign state: United Kingdom
- Postcode district: IV15 9
- Police: Scotland
- Fire: Scottish
- Ambulance: Scottish

Fodderty (Scottish Gaelic: Fodhraitidh) is a small hamlet, close to Dingwall, Ross-shire in the Scottish Highlands and is in the Scottish council area of Highland.

The small hamlet of Bottacks is located 1 mile to the west, and just to the east is Brae or Brea, formed in 1777 from the lands (long held by a branch of the Mackenzies) of Davochcarn, Davochmaluag and Davochpollo. "Davochmaluag" is named after the famous missionary saint - St Moluag of Lismore (died AD592) - to whom the church at Fodderty was dedicated. Only a mound remains in the burial-ground to mark where this church stood.

Fodderty Cemetery also contains the burial place of Willie Logan (1913-1966) that is marked by a memorial in the shape of a pier of the Tay Road Bridge which, through his father's Muir of Ord-based building firm, he helped to construct. He also founded the Scottish regional airline Loganair.

The growing town of Dingwall now encroaches on Fodderty.

== See also ==
John M'Gilligen of Fodderty who held conventicles in houses throughout the county.
