= Bottacks =

Coordinates: 57.59705°N 4.51195°W

- Location within the Highland council area
- OS grid reference: NH499591
- Council area: Highland
- Country: Scotland
- Sovereign state: United Kingdom
- Post town: Strathpeffer
- Postcode district: IV14 9
- Police: Scotland
- Fire: Scottish
- Ambulance: Scottish

Bottacks (Na Botagan in Scottish Gaelic) is a small scattered township, located 1.5 miles north north east of Strathpeffer, in Ross-shire, Scottish Highlands and is in the Scottish council area of Highland.

The village of Fodderty lies 1 mile to the east.
