= Achterneed =

Coordinates: 57.602°N 4.529°W

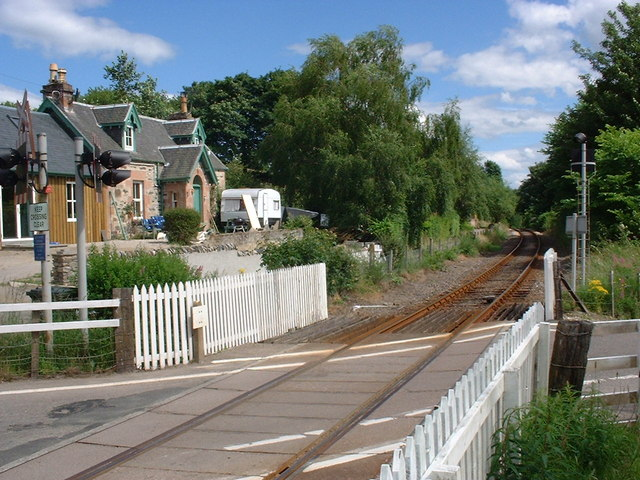
- Level crossing at Achterneed

- Location within the Highland council area
- OS grid reference: NH489596
- Council area: Highland
- Country: Scotland
- Sovereign state: United Kingdom
- Police: Scotland
- Fire: Scottish
- Ambulance: Scottish

Achterneed (Scottish Gaelic: Uachdar Niad), also spelled Auchterneed, is a village in Highland, Scotland, lies within the environs of Castle Leod, seat of the Earl of Cromartie, 1-mile (1.6 km) north of Strathpeffer.

== Geography ==
Achterneed lies on the slopes above Strath Peffer. Achterneed Burn and Peffery Burn flow through the village. The surrounding hillside also plays host to the crofting settlements of Bottacks (Scottish Gaelic: Na Botagan), the Heights of Inchvannie (Scottish Gaelic: Àirdean Innis Mheannaidh) and the Heights of Keppoch (Scottish Gaelic: Àirdean Cheapaich).

== Landmarks ==
While there are few amenities in the village itself, there is a public phone box and post box.

Achterneed railway station, which lies next to a level crossing, used to serve the Dingwall and Skye Railway, but was closed in December 1964, and all-but demolished. The station house, while remaining, is now a private residence.

The Heights of Achterneed (Scottish Gaelic: Àirdean Uachdair Niad), lying to the north, is a small dispersed crofting settlement, which, today, is often considered to be part of Achterneed itself.
