= Lochslin =

Coordinates: 57.7963°N 3.9519°W

Lochslin: Scottish Gaelic: Loch Slinn
- Location within the Ross and Cromarty area
- OS grid reference: NH840801
- Council area: Highland
- Country: Scotland
- Sovereign state: United Kingdom
- Post town: Fearn
- Postcode district: IV20 1
- Police: Scotland
- Fire: Scottish
- Ambulance: Scottish

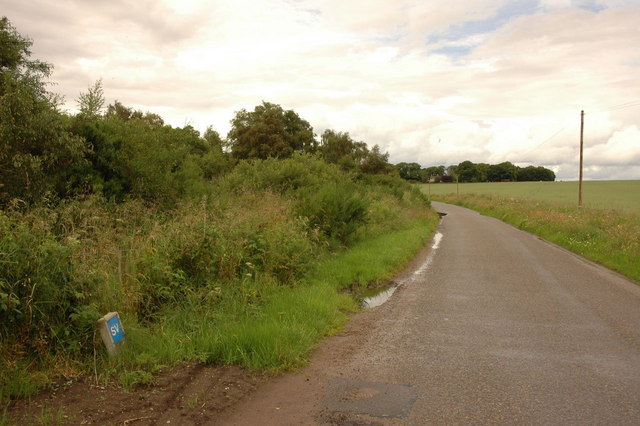
Road to Lochslin

Lochslin (Scottish Gaelic: Loch Slinn) is a small hamlet, situated northeast of the fresh water loch, Loch Eye in Tain, Ross-shire, Scottish Highlands and is in the Scottish council area of Highland. Originally a loch that dried up, the loch survives in name only. Close to the village is the ancient ruin of Lochslin Castle.
