= Beinn Eilideach =

Mountain near Ullapool in Ross-shire in the Scottish Highlands

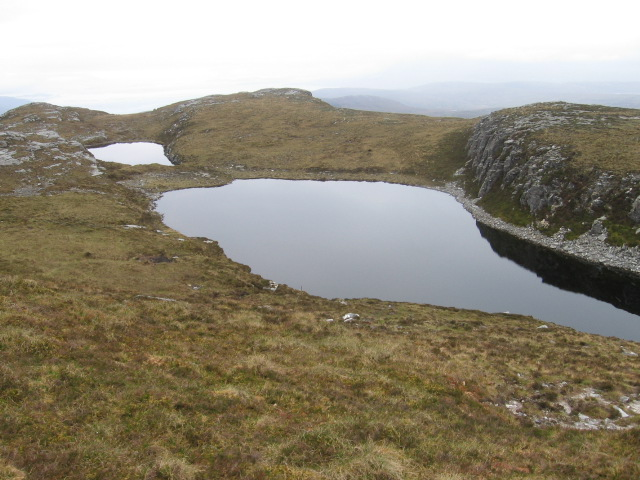
- Lochans on Beinn Eilideach

Highest point
- Elevation: 559 m (1,834 ft)
- Prominence: 187 m (614 ft)
- Listing: Marilyn
- Coordinates: 57°53′12″N 5°05′15″W

Naming
- Language of name: Gaelic

Geography
- Location within Highland
- Location: Wester Ross, Scotland
- OS grid: NH170927
- Topo map: OS Landranger 20, Explorer 436

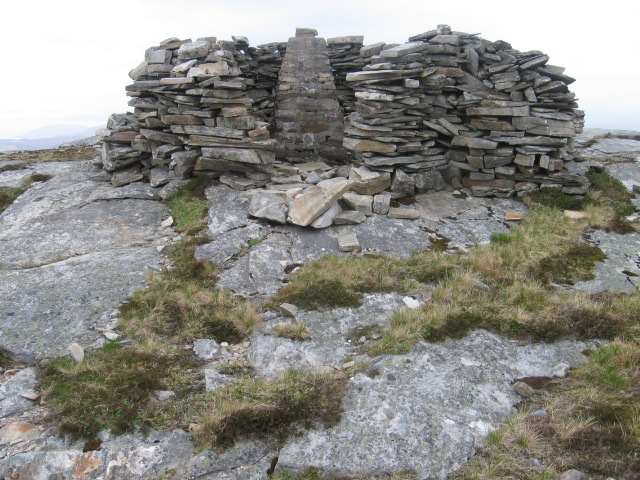
Beinn Eilideach summit

Beinn Eilideach (mountain of hinds) is a mountain near Ullapool in Ross-shire in the Scottish Highlands. It is 559 metres high, and listed as a Marilyn. It has a triangulation pillar near the summit, though the highest point is actually 100 metre away to the west of this.
