= Polbain =

Coordinates: 58.03582°N 5.35858°W

Polbain: Scottish Gaelic: Am Poll Bàn
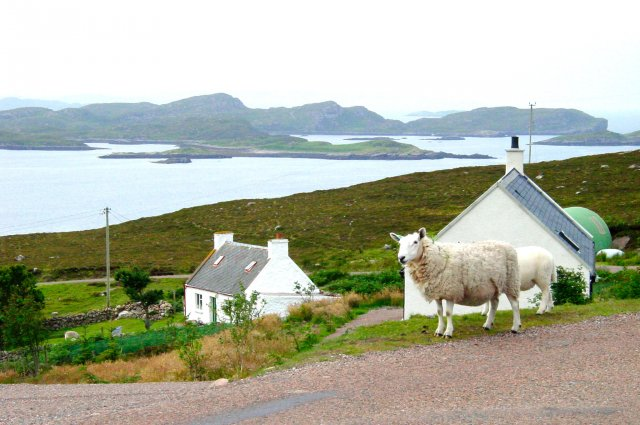
- Polbain looking south to the Summer Isles

- Location within the Highland council area
- OS grid reference: NC018101
- Council area: Highland
- Country: Scotland
- Sovereign state: United Kingdom
- Post town: Achiltibuie
- Postcode district: IV26 2
- Police: Scotland
- Fire: Scottish
- Ambulance: Scottish

Polbain (Scottish Gaelic: Am Poll Bàn, lit. 'the white pool') is a remote crofting township, located on the north Badentarbat Bay on the west coast of Scotland, in western Ross-shire, Scottish Highlands and is in the Scottish council area of Highland. The township lies two miles (three kilometres) northwest of the village of Achiltibuie. The village overlooks the Summer Isles.

The Brochs of Coigach is a small residential accommodation project that was completed in November 2011.
