= Coigach =

Coordinates: 58.02°N 5.34°W

Coigach: Scottish Gaelic: A' Chòigeach
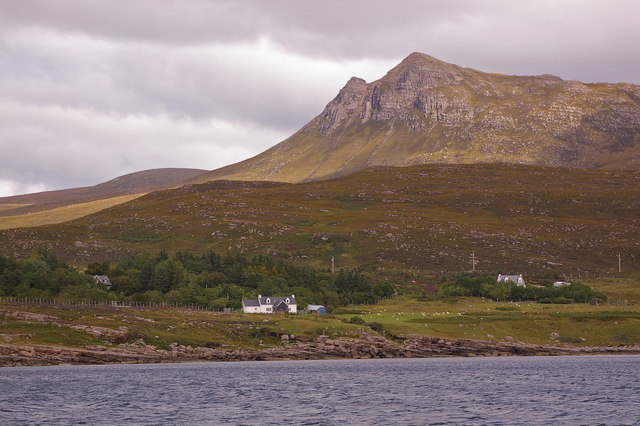
- The township of Achduart, with Cairn Conmheall in the background.

- Location within the Ross and Cromarty area
- Population: 228
- OS grid reference: NC025085
- Community council: Coigach
- Council area: Highland
- Lieutenancy area: Ross and Cromarty
- Country: Scotland
- Sovereign state: United Kingdom
- Post town: ULLAPOOL
- Postcode district: IV26
- Dialling code: 01854
- Police: Scotland
- Fire: Scottish
- Ambulance: Scottish
- UK Parliament: Caithness, Sutherland and Easter Ross
- Scottish Parliament: Caithness, Sutherland and Ross

Coigach (Scottish Gaelic: A' Chòigeach) is a peninsula north of Ullapool, in Wester Ross in the Northwest Highlands of Scotland. The area consists of a traditional crofting and fishing community of a couple of hundred houses located between mountain and shore on a peninsula looking over the Summer Isles and the sea. The main settlement is Achiltibuie. Like its northerly neighbour, Assynt in Sutherland, Coigach has mountains which rise sharply from quiet, lochan-studded moorland, and a highly indented rocky coast with many islands, bays and headlands. The highest summit is Ben Mor Coigach at 743 metres; the distinctive profile of Stac Pollaidh is the other main peak within Coigach. The scenic qualities of Coigach, along with neighbouring Assynt, have led to the area being designated as the Assynt-Coigach National Scenic Area, one of 40 such areas in Scotland.

The name is derived from the Gaelic for "five" or "fifths", and refers to the five townships of Achduart, Achnacarinan, Acheninver, Achnahaird and Achiltibuie.

== Local government ==
Coigach formed a barony of the civil parish of Loch Broom. In 1690 it was transferred into the county of Cromartyshire, and indeed it was the largest single portion of land in the county, which consisted of a series of unconnected exclaves. Until changes in civil registration districts in 1857 the barony also included Isle Martin, the lands down to Corrie beyond Ullapool, the various farms of Strathkanaird and to the east the Forest of Achall and Rhiddorach.

The Local Government (Scotland) Act 1889 provided that "the counties of Ross and Cromarty shall cease to be separate counties, and shall be united for all purposes whatsoever, under the name of the county of Ross and Cromarty", and Coigach thus became part of Ross and Cromarty. Although the counties were replaced by a system of regional and district councils in 1975 Coigach remains part of Ross and Cromarty for purposes such as land registration and lieutenancy. The regions and districts were replaced by unitary councils in 1996, and Coigach now forms a community within Highland council area.

In 2010 a community development company was established on the initiative of the community council. Key issues to be addressed by the company are affordable housing, the provision of health services, the ageing demographic profile of the area and promoting economic development. The lack of tourist facilities, and of a ‘brand’ for Coigach, were also concerns. A subsidiary of the Coigach Community Development Company, Coigach Wind Power, operates a 500 kW wind turbine to raise funds for the development company's projects.

== Conservation ==
The Coigach and Assynt Living Landscape Project is a community partnership project which aims to bring environmental and economic benefits to the Coigach and Assynt regions of North West Scotland. The partnership includes landowners (private and community), the local community and charitable organisations, with the Scottish Wildlife Trust being the lead partner. The project is described as an "ecosystem restoration project", and aims to "bring woodland connectivity, species-rich flora and fauna, and economic growth back to the Scottish uplands".

== History ==
During the Highland Clearances, attempts were made to evict the crofting tenants of Coigach in 1852–1853. However, the women of Coigach disarmed twenty policemen and sheriff officers, burning their summonses and throwing their batons into the sea. The men of Coigach formed the second line of defense should the women receive any ill-treatment. The officers of the law returned home without having served a single summons or evicting a single crofter. Four weeks later these events were repeated when six constables took on the women again, but with no more success, leaving the land-lord extremely frustrated. The crofters of Coigach had held out for more than two years and eventually the estate managers and the land-lord gave up in trying to resettle them. Coigach was a rare victory for the people over the landlord.

The peninsula is also important to Scottish Gaelic literature and to that of the Scottish diaspora. The cowboy poet Murchadh MacGilleathain ("Murdo MacLean"), a native of Coigach, was one of many Gaels who emigrated from Scotland to the American West prior to the outbreak of the Great War. Around 1910, MacGilleathain expressed his loneliness and homesickness in a song-poem composed upon his cattle ranch in Montana: 'S ann a fhuair mi m' àrach an taobh tuath de Alba mhòr ("It was in the north of great Scotland that I was reared"). As he expressed hope to do in the song, Murchadh permanently returned home to Coigach. His song entered the oral tradition of Wester Ross and was collected and recorded by the School of Scottish Studies from Maighread Cros in the village of Ceann Loch Iù, along Loch Ewe.

== See also ==
- Blairbuie
