= Marian Leven =

Scottish artist

- Born: 25 April 1944 (age 81); Auchtermuchty, Scotland
- Spouse: Will Maclean

Marian Leven RSA (born 1944) is a Scottish artist known for her sculptures, land art and collage work and for painting in oils, acrylics, and watercolour.

== Biography ==
Leven was born in 1944 and is originally from Auchtermuchty in Fife, Scotland. She studied Textile arts at Gray's School of Art in Aberdeen, from 1962 to 1966 and now works in various art media including painting in watercolour, oils and acrylic, printmaking, sculpture, land art and collage. She has a family tradition of weaving. Leven's work often focusses on the Scottish landscape, weather and social history, although some pieces are abstract.

Leven has been Artist-in-residence at Sabhal Mòr Ostaig on Skye. Leven was a member of the Royal Scottish Watercolour Society and has also showed works at the Royal Scottish Academy, the Royal Glasgow Institute of the Fine Arts and with the Society of Aberdeen Artists.

Leven has created public art jointly with Will Maclean: the sculpture Waterlines at the University of Aberdeen and the land art and land raid work An Suileachan on the Isle of Lewis.

Leven was awarded the Noble Grossart prize in 1997. She and Maclean were awarded the Saltire Society's Award for Arts and Craft in Architecture in 2013 for An Suileachan.

She has work in the collection of the Verdant Works. She also exhibited in the 2002 exhibition Beyond Conflict.

Leven convened the RSA Annual Exhibition in 2017. She has also worked as an art teacher and lecturer.

Leven is married to Will Maclean. They have three children: the film director John Maclean, the musician David Maclean of Django Django, and a daughter, Miriam, who has Down's Syndrome. Leven lives in Tayport in Fife.
