= Inver, Highland =

Coordinates: 57.820°N 3.9167°W

Inver
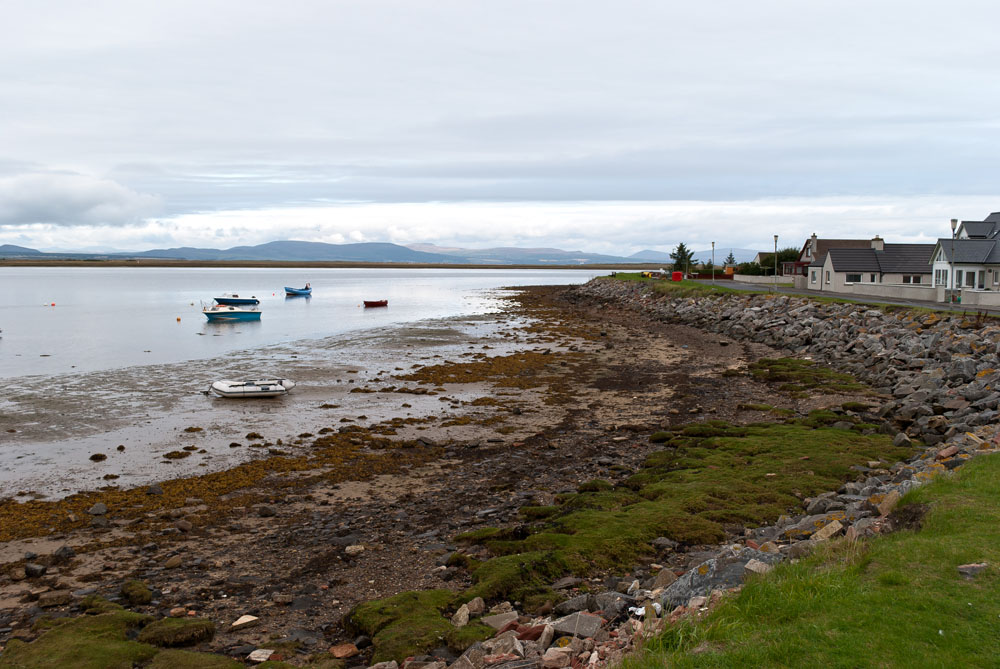
- Inver Sea Front in 2010

- Location within the Ross and Cromarty area
- OS grid reference: NH854833
- Council area: Highland
- Country: Scotland
- Sovereign state: United Kingdom
- Post town: Tain
- Postcode district: IV20 1
- Police: Scotland
- Fire: Scottish
- Ambulance: Scottish
- UK Parliament: Caithness, Sutherland and Easter Ross
- Scottish Parliament: Caithness, Sutherland and Ross

Inver is a small village located on the south east shore of the Inver Bay at the point where the bay opens out into the Dornoch Firth and is in Ross-shire, Scottish Highlands and is in the Scottish council area of Highland. Morrich More, the spit of the land to the North-West of Inver, is a military aerial range, with the village being included in the range airspace.

== Community ==
Most of the buildings are at least 100 years old, mostly single-storey cottages (although highly modernised) originally built for a fishing community, with newer buildings outside the original streets. It comprises approximately 300 houses, a primary school, village hall and a pub. There are no shops.

== Fishing ==
Fishing as a traditional activity continues, although not on a large scale commercial basis. Local catches commonly include mackerel, ling, coley, crab and lobster.

The Annual Reports of the Fishery Board for Scotland provide an insight into the state of fishing from Inver in the years before the First World War.

Fishery Statistics

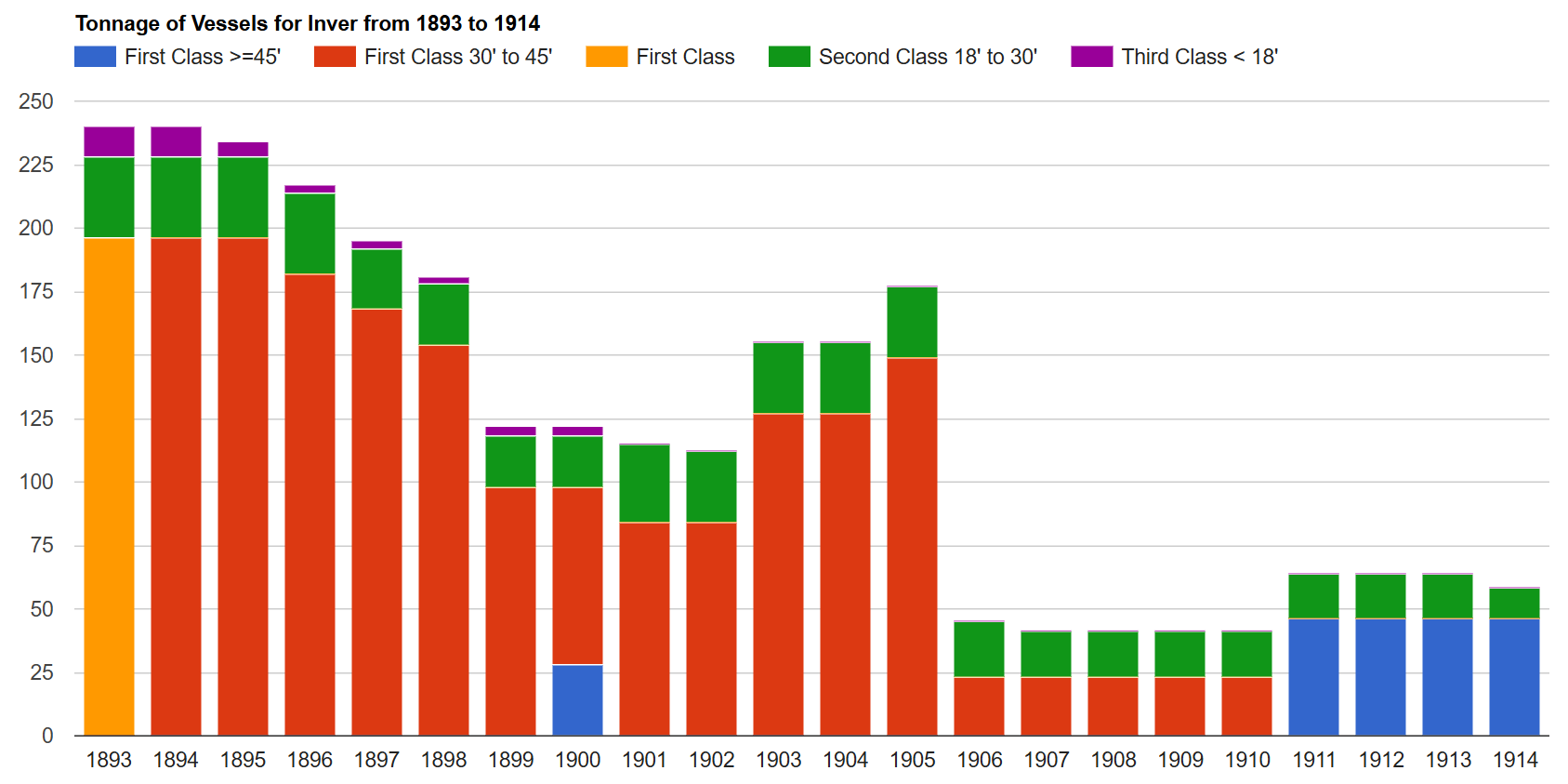
Tonnage of vessels

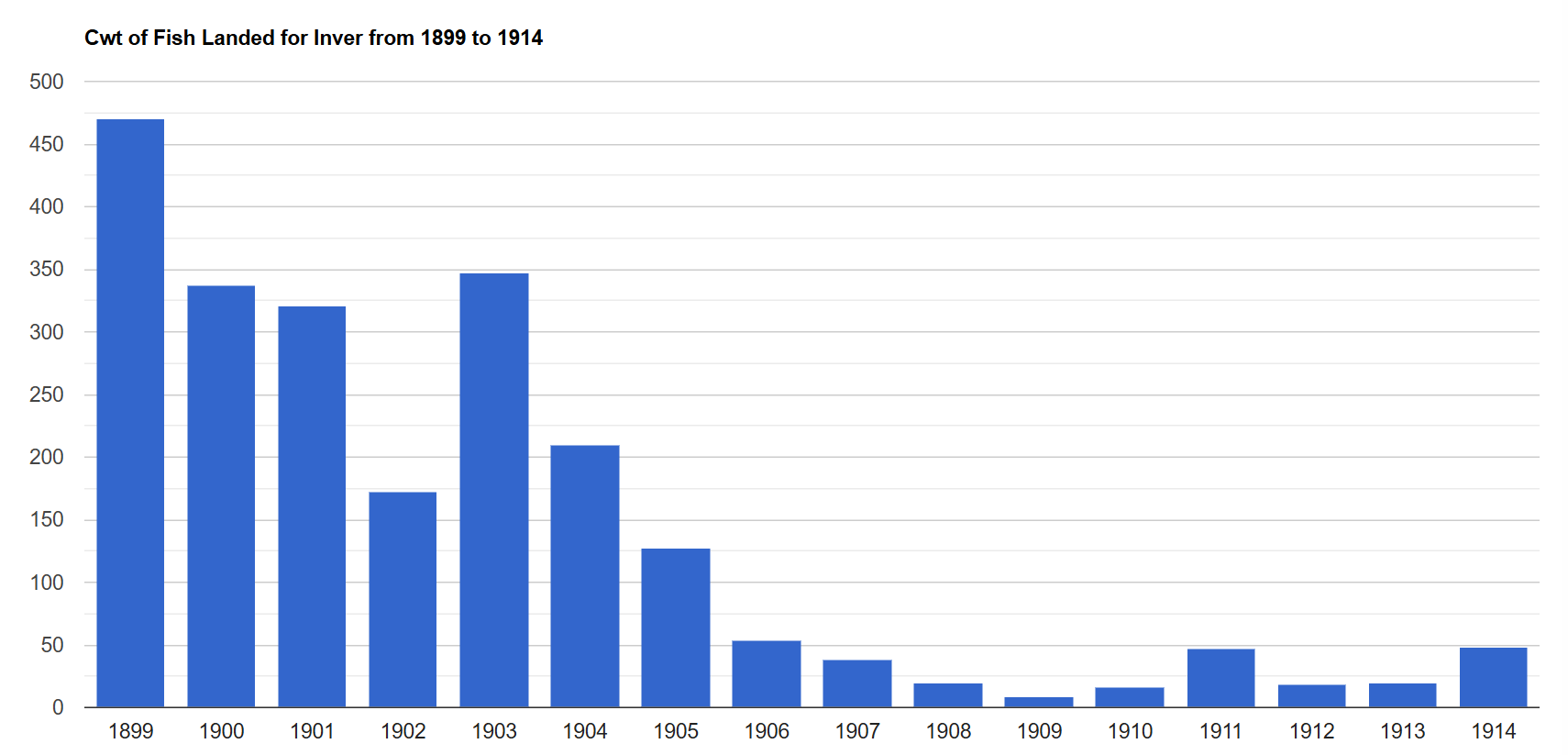
Cwt of fish landed

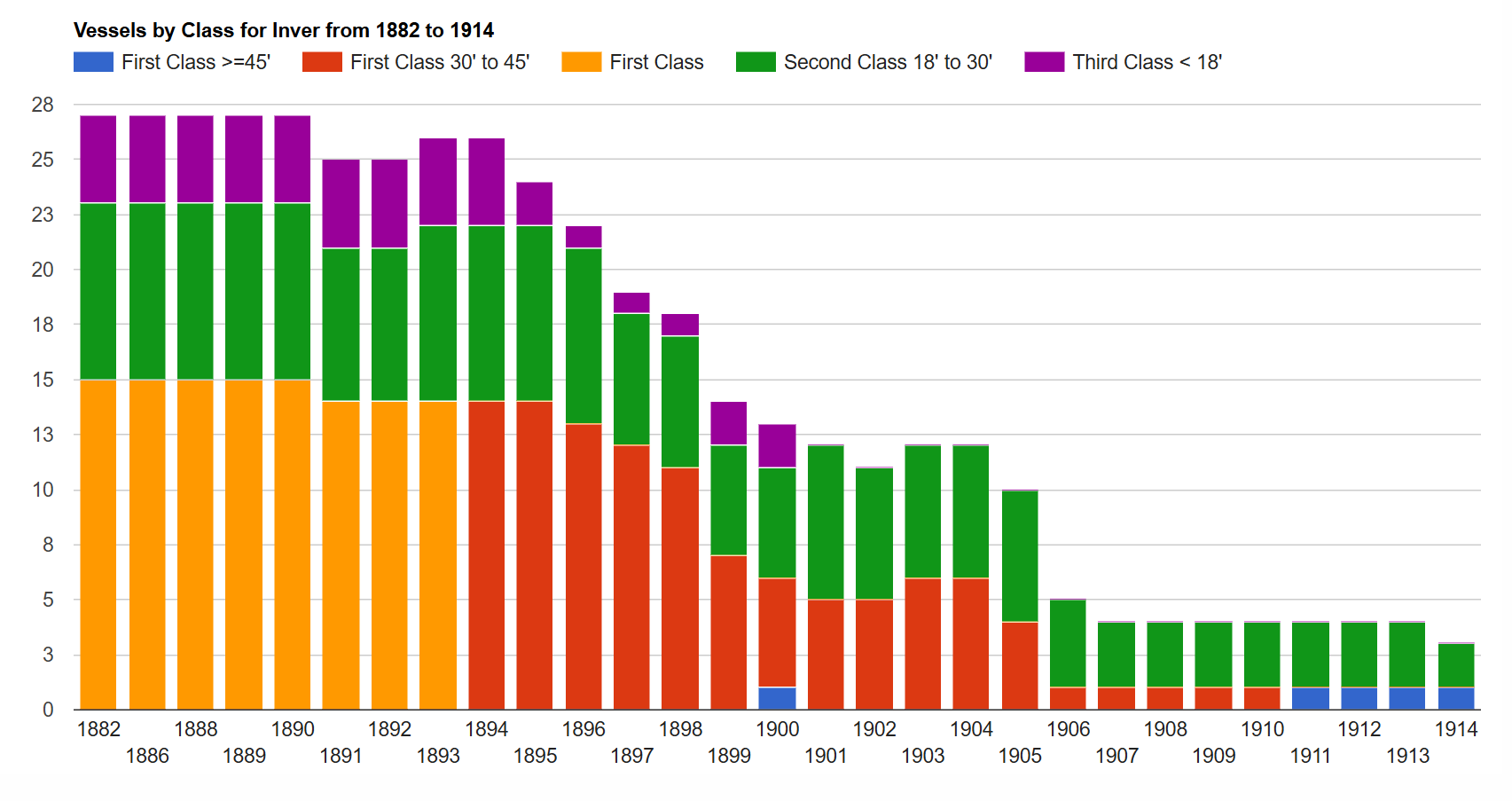
Vessels by class

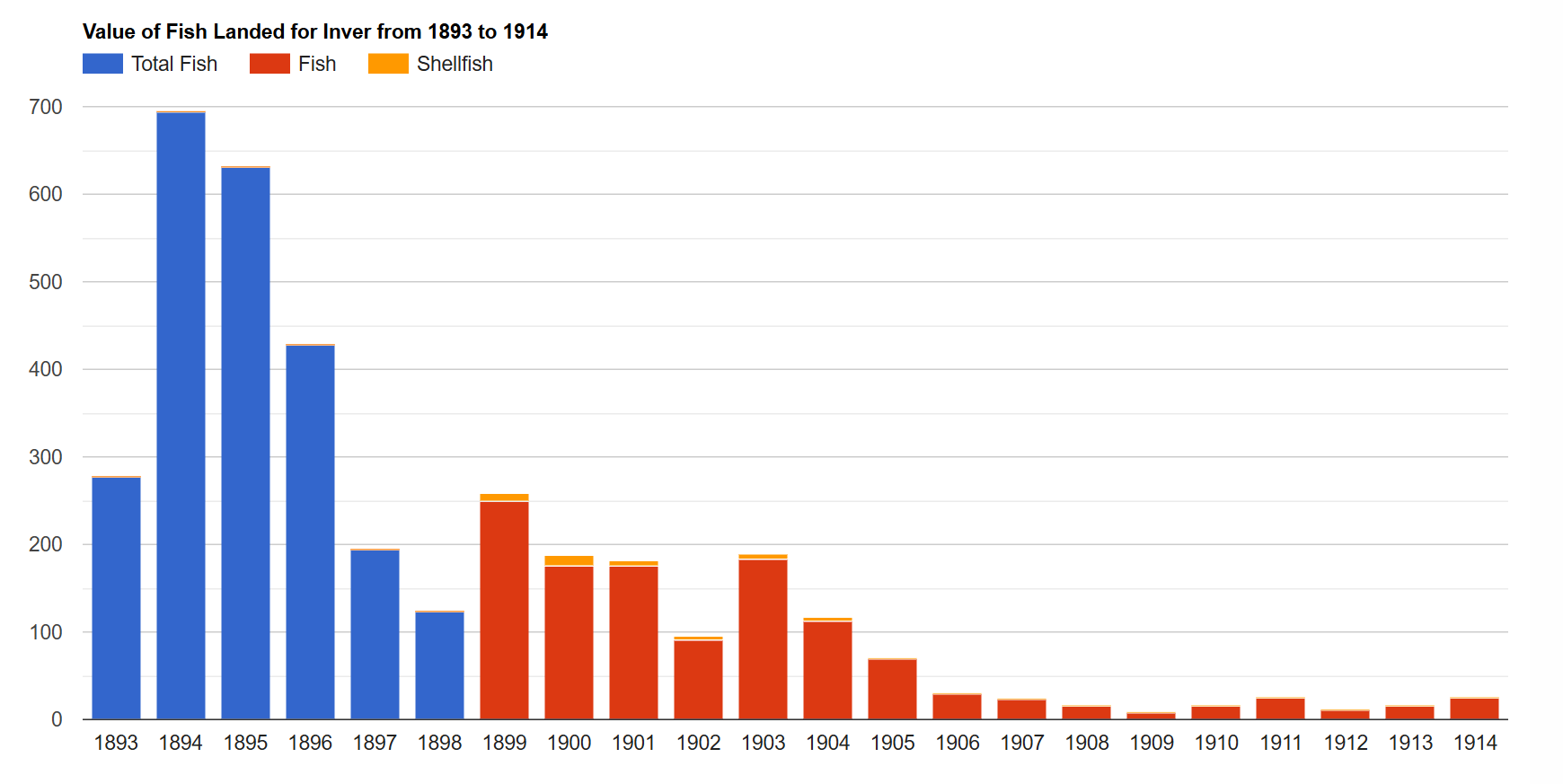
Value (£) of fish landed

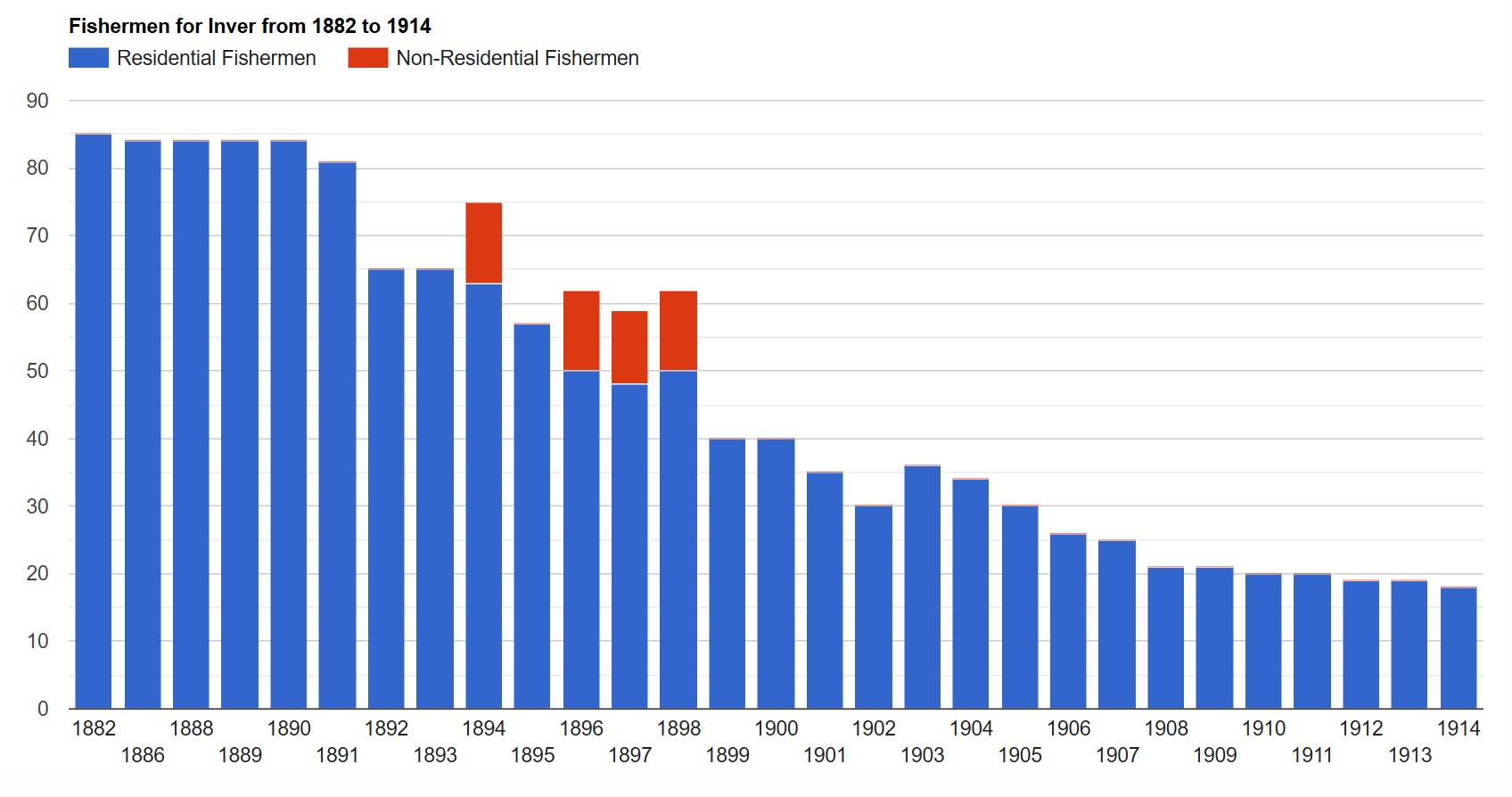
Fishermen

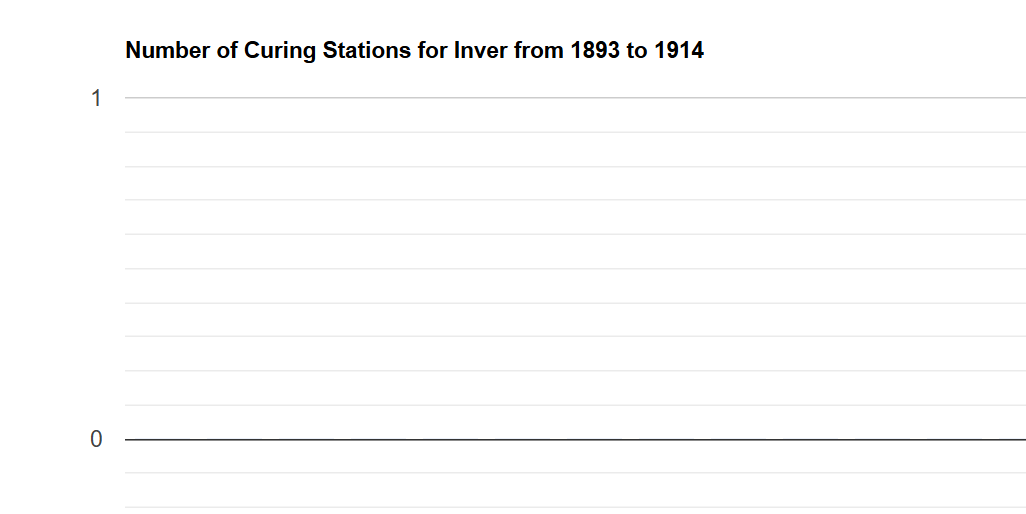
Placeholder - no curing stations

The report for 1906 explains the decline in local fishing: "the majority of the Inver men were employed in fishing for herrings at other parts of the coast, in their own boats, or those of other fishermen.".
