= Strathkanaird =

Coordinates: 57.9697°N 5.12899°W

Strathkanaird: Scottish Gaelic: Srath Chainneart
- Location within the Ross and Cromarty area
- OS grid reference: NC150021
- Civil parish: Lochbroom
- Council area: Highland
- Country: Scotland
- Sovereign state: United Kingdom
- Post town: Ullapool
- Postcode district: IV26 2
- Police: Scotland
- Fire: Scottish
- Ambulance: Scottish

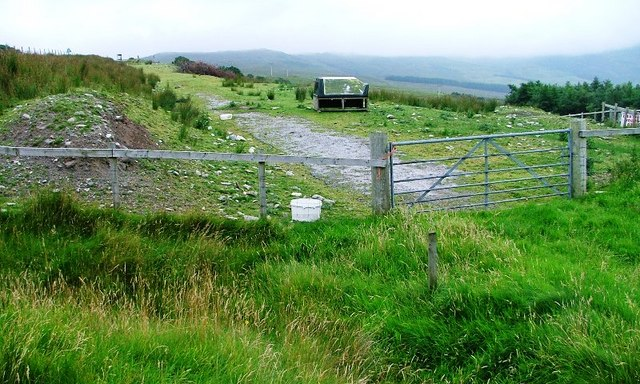
The Old Road, Strathcanaird

Strathkanaird (also Strathcanaird) (Scottish Gaelic: Srath Chainneart) is a remote crofting township around seven miles north of Ullapool, in western Ross-shire, Scottish Highlands and is in the Scottish council area of Highland.
