= Achiltibuie =

Coordinates: 58.02°N 5.34°W

Achiltibuie: Scottish Gaelic: Aichilidh Bhuidhe
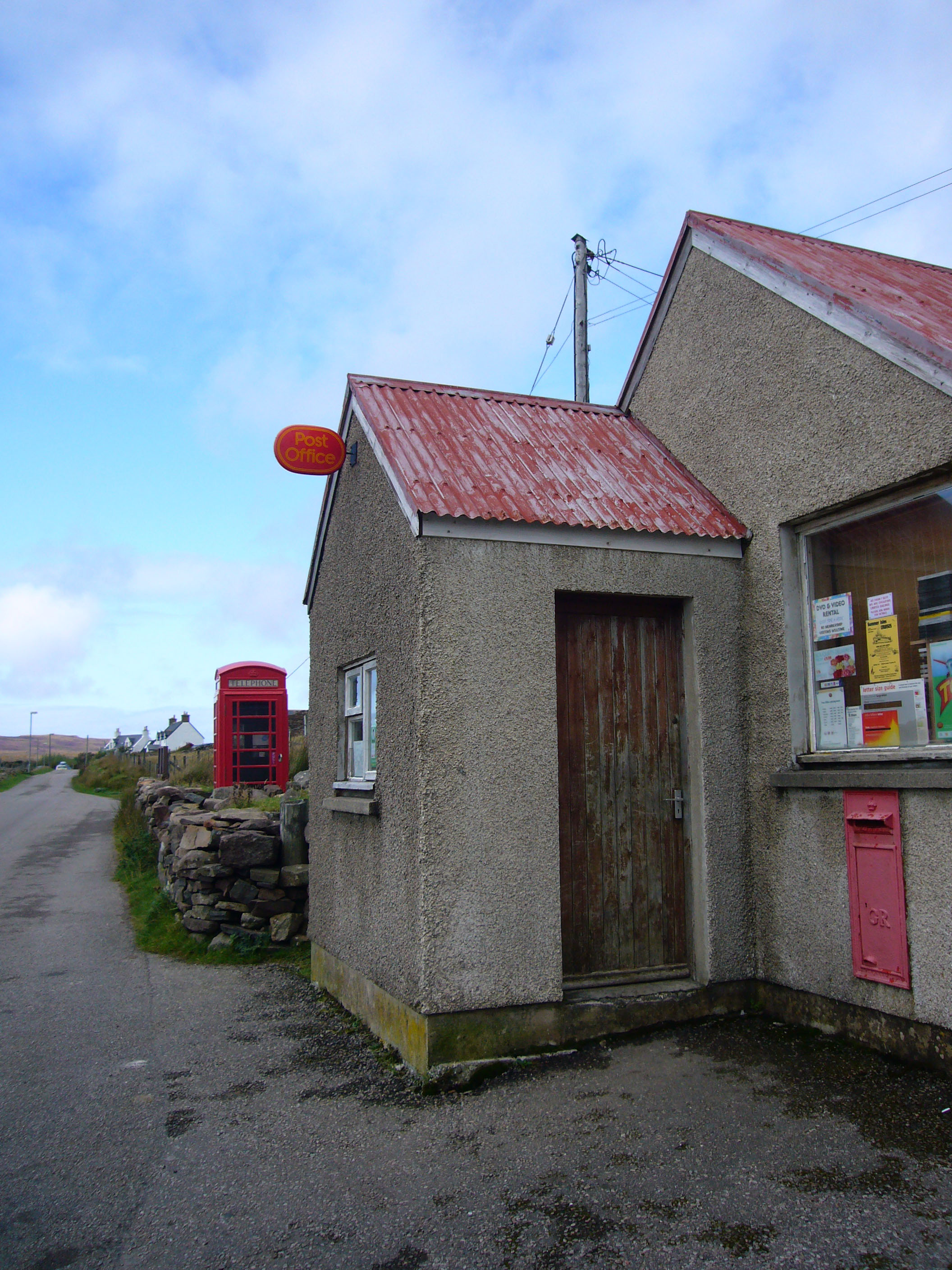
- The Post Office in Achiltibuie

- Location within the Ross and Cromarty area
- OS grid reference: NC025085
- Community council: Coigach
- Council area: Highland
- Lieutenancy area: Ross and Cromarty
- Country: Scotland
- Sovereign state: United Kingdom
- Post town: ULLAPOOL
- Postcode district: IV26
- Dialling code: 01854
- Police: Scotland
- Fire: Scottish
- Ambulance: Scottish
- UK Parliament: Caithness, Sutherland and Easter Ross
- Scottish Parliament: Caithness, Sutherland and Ross

Achiltibuie (/ˌæxɪltɪˈbuːi/; Scottish Gaelic: Aichilidh Bhuidhe) is a long linear village in Ross and Cromarty, Highland, on the Coigach coast of northwestern Scotland, overlooking Badentarbet Bay to the west. Loch Broom and the Summer Isles lie to the south. Located 10 miles (16 km) northwest of Ullapool as the crow flies. Achiltibuie is the central community of a series of townships and communities stretching from Culnacraig, through Badenscallie and Polglass (where the community hall, the primary school and the Piping School Cafe are located), Polbain, and Reiff to Achnahaird.

== History ==
The first post office in the village opened on 28 July 1884.

The name is said to come from Gaelic Achd Ille Bhuidhe - the field of the blond lad - but this is just folk etymology and it actually comes from the Gaelic Aichilidh Bhuidhe.

=== Smokehouse ===
For a time the Summer Isles Smokehouse attracted visitors. In 2013 the community had hopes to re-establish the business.

=== Hydroponicum ===
The Hydroponicum, a facility for growing fresh fruit and vegetables indoors using hydroponics, was built in the village in the 1980s by Robert Irvine, then owner of the Summer Isles Hotel. The Hydroponicum was known for growing exotic fruit such as bananas all year round. It attracted up to 10,000 visitors a year until it was sold in 2007 to a company based in the Isle of Man. New greenhouses have since been built apart from the original hydroponicum buildings, and the new owners continue to grow fruit and vegetables for local businesses and residents. A community buyout attempt in 2011 by the Coigach Community Development Company fell through when the site's sellers pulled out. The building has now been demolished. Some of the former staff of the Hydroponicum run a small-scale activity known as The Achiltibuie Garden, situated nearby.

== Notable residents ==
- Tom Longstaff (1875–1964), mountaineer.
- Lucy Irvine (b. 1956), writer, lived very briefly in the Summer Isles Hotel with her father, who owned it and the Hydroponicum.
- Reiner Luyken (b. 1951), foreign correspondent and author
- David Maclean, musician, drummer and producer of the rock band Django Django.His parents Marian Leven, a Scottish artist, and Will Maclean, also a noted artist, spend a lot of time in the place.

== Notable recent achievements ==
'Coigach Community Rowing' the crew members of which coastal rowing club are all local, won the World St. Ayles Skiff Rowing Championships in July 2013 and a mixed crew from the club won the Alan Spong Trophy for 1st Mixed crew 4-oar rowing at the Thames Great River Race in September 2013. Coigach Community Rowing hand-built their two St Ayles rowing skiffs, the 'Coigach Lass' and the 'Lily~Rose' and race under the auspices of the Scottish Coastal Rowing Association, which is the governing body of St Ayles class coastal rowing around the world.

The Brochs of Coigach designed by SBA Architects Ltd were shortlisted in 2011 for the RIAS Andrew Doolan Best Building in Scotland Award. They are two unique buildings landscaped into a hillside. They were Regional Finalist of the Civic Trust Awards 2013. In 2015, they were highly commended in the inaugural Scottish Rural Awards.

== Cultural connections ==
The Roman epic movie The Eagle, based on the 1954 novel The Eagle of the Ninth by Rosemary Sutcliff, was filmed on location in Achiltibuie for a week in October 2009. The main location was Fox Point, Old Dornie. The Pictish village which was constructed at Fox Point was used on most days of the filming. Other sites included Achnahaird beach where a horse chase was filmed and Loch Lurgainn.

The village and its residents featured in The Wee Mad Road (2008) by Jack and Barbara Maloney.

== See also ==
- Summer Isles
- Wester Ross
