= Torridonian =

Sequence of rocks in Scotland

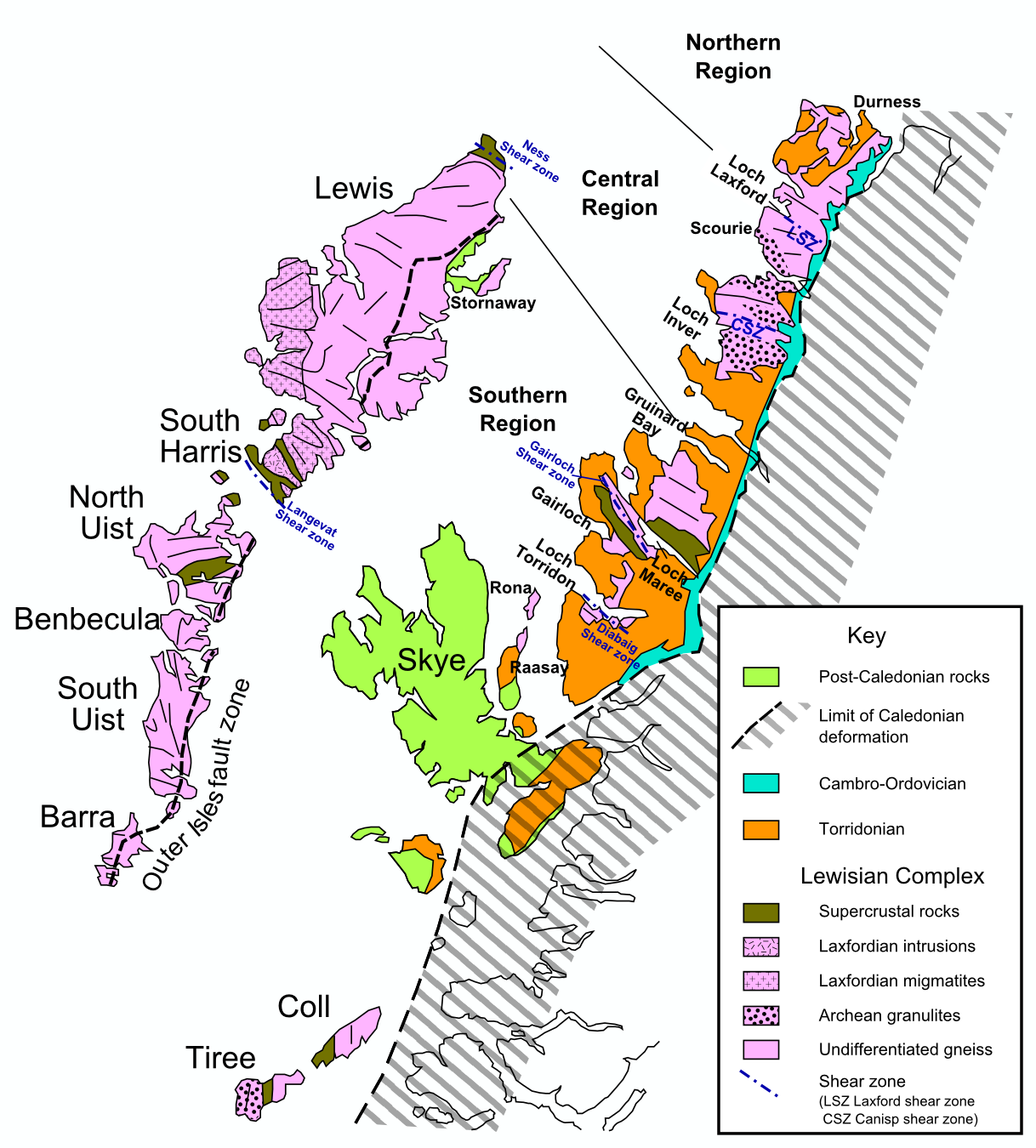
Geological map of the Hebridean terrane showing distribution of Torridonian sediments

Torridonian is the informal name given to a sequence of Mesoproterozoic to Neoproterozoic sedimentary rocks that outcrop in a strip along the northwestern coast of Scotland and some parts of the Inner Hebrides from the Isle of Mull in the southwest to Cape Wrath in the northeast. They lie unconformably on the Archaean to Paleoproterozoic basement rocks of the Lewisian complex and unconformably beneath the Cambrian to Lower Ordovician rocks of the Ardvreck Group.

== History of research ==
The sequence was first mapped as a unit by John MacCulloch and was initially assumed to be part of the Old Red Sandstone. The first name used specifically for this sequence was "Torridon Sandstone" introduced in 1866 by James Nicol. By 1892 the term was shortened to "Torridonian" by the Geological Survey. In 1893 the survey had subdivided the Torridonian into four units, the Diabaig, Applecross, Aultbea and Cailleach Head groups (which are now the names of formations within the Torridon Group). At about the same time Lower Cambrian fossils were found in the sequence above the unconformity, suggesting that the Torridonian was of Precambrian age.

Little further work was carried out on the Torridonian until the 1950s when Edward Irving and Keith Runcorn sampled the sequence and determined paleomagnetic pole directions, observing a major change between samples from part of the Diabaig Group (as then understood, now known to be part of the Stoer Group) and the overlying Torridon Group. In 1969 Sandy Stewart subdivided the Torridonian into the groups that are in current use. He had already recognised the existence of a major angular unconformity between the Stoer Group and the Torridon Group.

The age of the main part of the Torridonian and of the older Stoer Group is constrained by the youngest ages from the Lewisian complex (~1100 Ma) and the age of the oldest fossils in the Ardvreck Group (~544 Ma). Direct dating of the Torridonian is restricted to: Pb-Pb dating of a limestone in the Stoer Group (1199±70 Ma) and Ar-Ar dating of the Stac Fada Member ejecta blanket deposit at a slightly lower stratigraphic level (1177±5 Ma); Rb-Sr and Pb-Pb dating of phosphate concretions in the Diabaig Formation (994±48 Ma and 951±120 Ma respectively).

Variations in thickness and lithology were interpreted to mean that both the Stoer and Sleat/Torridon Groups were deposited in a rift setting. Evidence from seismic reflection data in the Minch suggested that the Minch Fault was active throughout the deposition of the Torridon Group. This is consistent with the generally westerly derived pebbly material throughout the thickness of the Applecross Formation, suggesting a constantly rejuvenated sediment source in that direction. More recent work has suggested that although the Stoer and Sleat groups were probably deposited in a rift setting, the scale and continuity of the Torridon Group, particularly the Applecross and Aultbea Formations, is more consistent with a molasse type foreland basin setting possibly related to the Grenville Orogeny.

== Revised stratigraphy ==
Going back to the late 19th century, geologists had speculated that at least the lower part of the Moine sequence might be a lateral equivalent of the Torridonian, based on similarities in lithology, sedimentary structures and thickness. The application of detrital zircon geochronology to the Torridonian and Moine sequences has allowed this proposed correlation to be tested. The Morar Group] of the Moine has a very similar spectrum of detrital zircon ages to the Torridon Group. Both have a population of youngest zircons that give ages that match the Grenville Orogeny. In contrast, the Glenfinnan Group has a youngest zircon population that matches the Renlandian Orogeny, an event that is now known to have affected the Morar Group. The detrital zircon and other geochronological data show that there is major break in the Moine stratigraphy at the base of the Glenfinnan Group and that it can, therefore, no longer be regarded as a supergroup.

In the revised stratigraphic framework for the Proterozoic sedimentary rocks of the Highlands: the Stoer Group is part of a separate sequence whose deposition predated the Grenville Orogeny and has no equivalents in Scotland; the Torridon Group (together with the Sleat Group, the Iona and Tarskavaig groups and three groups on Shetland) are correlated with the Morar Group forming the Wester Ross Supergroup; after the Renlandian Orogeny, the Glenfinnan, Loch Eil and Badenoch groups were deposited and together form the younger Loch Ness Supergroup.
