= Moinian =

Geological rock formation in Scotland

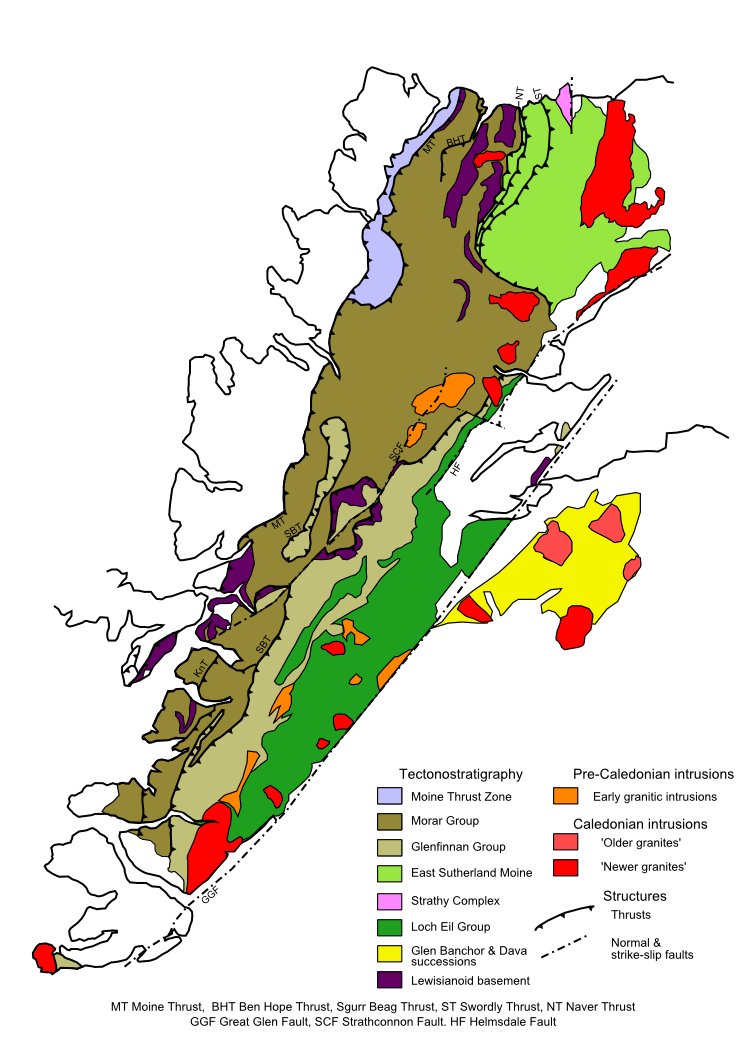
Map of the distribution of the Moine on Mainland Scotland and the Inner Hebrides

The Moinian or just the Moine, formerly the Moine Supergroup, is a sequence of Neoproterozoic metasediments that outcrop in the Northwest Highlands of Scotland between the Moine Thrust Belt to the northwest and the Great Glen Fault to the southeast and one part of the Grampian Highlands to the southeast of the fault. It takes its name from A' Mhòine, a peat bog in northern Sutherland.

== History of research ==
The metamorphic rocks that are now known informally as "the Moine" were originally interpreted as of Silurian age, as they lie in sequence with Cambrian to lower Silurian sedimentary rocks (now known to be lower Ordovician at the youngest and part of the Ardvreck Group). This view, espoused particularly by Roderick Murchison, a geologist known as the "Master of the Silurian", was opposed by James Nicol, who thought that the contact (or "zone of complication" as he called it) was tectonic in nature and that the metamorphic rocks were older and not in stratigraphic sequence with those below. This difference of opinion led to the Highlands controversy, which pitted groups of geologists against each other, particularly between the Geological Survey and academic researchers. It was eventually settled in favour of Nicol's view with the recognition of the Moine Thrust.

During the controversy, the metamorphic rocks above the contact were known as "gneisses and slates" or "gneissose schists". In the classic memoir The Geological Structure of the North-west Highlands of Scotland, Peach and Horne and their colleagues used the terms "eastern schists" and "Moine schists" interchangeably. Eventually these rocks, now generally known as the "Moine Series" were mapped all the way to the Great Glen Fault in areas not covered by the Old Red Sandstone.

The Moine was not subdivided in a regional way until 1969, when three units were proposed; the Morar, Glenfinnan and Loch Eil divisions. The contact at the base of the Glenfinnan division against the Morar division was identified as tectonic in 1970, the Sgùrr Beag Slide (now known as the Sgùrr Beag Thrust). At about the same time, a pre-Caledonian metamorphic and tectonic event affecting the Moine was identified, known as the "Morarian" or "Knoydartian". By 1994, the term "Moine Supergroup" was defined to include the Morar, Glenfinnan and Loch Eil groups but not to include the Grampian Highlands sequences to the southeast of the Great Glen Fault that had been proposed as part of the Moine.

== Revised stratigraphy ==
Similarities in lithology and sedimentary facies between the Torridon Group and the Morar Group had long been noted. A normal stratigraphic contact between the Morar and Glenfinnan groups was interpreted on the Ross of Mull, making it the only non-tectonic contact between the groups, which elsewhere is formed by the Sgùrr Beag Thrust. A re-examination of this boundary has, however, identified a zone of high strain, meaning that the boundary is everywhere tectonic across the Highlands. Detrital zircon geochronology, combined with the dating of igneous intrusions and metamorphic events, has supported the Torridon to Morar correlation. The Glenfinnan and Loch Eil groups (and the correlative Badenoch Group) all contain detrital zircons that give ages younger than 950 Ma, the timing of the Renlandian Orogeny, which is known to have affected the Morar Group.

These observations have led to a revised stratigraphy for the Neoproterozoic sequences of the Highlands. An older Wester Ross Supergroup has been defined, consisting of the Torridon, Morar, Sleat, Iona groups and possibly the Tarskavaig Group and various groups on Shetland. This sequence was deposited in the interval 1000–960 Ma. A younger Loch Ness Supergroup has been defined, consisting of the Glenfinnan, Loch Eil and Badenoch groups. This sequence was deposited in the interval 900–870 Ma, after the Renlandian Orogeny and before the Knoydartian Orogeny.
