= Badenoch Group =

- Stratigraphic range: Tonian
- Type: Group
- Unit of: Loch Ness Supergroup
- Sub-units: Dava Subgroup, Glen Banchor Subgroup
- Underlies: Grampian Group, ?Appin Group
- Overlies: not seen
- Thickness: several kilometres

Lithology
- Primary: psammite
- Other: semipelite, gneissose quartzite

Location
- Region: Grampian Mountains

Type section
- Named for: Badenoch

The Badenoch Group is a sequence of metamorphosed Tonian age sedimentary rocks that outcrop across the Central Highlands of Scotland, east of the Great Glen. This rock sequence has formerly been referred to as the Central Highland Migmatite Complex and the Central Highland Division.

Badenoch Group rocks extend across the Monadhliath Mountains and some surrounding areas largely between the Great Glen and Ericht-Laidon fault belts though their margins are hidden beneath younger strata; Old Red Sandstone to the north and west and Grampian Group rocks elsewhere.

The succession is divided into two subgroups; the Dava Subgroup (previously referred to as the Dava Succession) and the Glen Banchor Subgroup. The former, named from the locality of Dava between Inverness and Grantown-on-Spey includes the Slochd Psammite and Flichity Semipelite formations. The latter is named for Glen Banchor, west of Newtonmore, the type area being from here to Laggan. The Glen Banchor sequence is believed to be between 1 and 1.5 km thick and unconformably overlain by rocks of the Grampian and Appin groups, though the boundary may be tectonic in nature. Long the subject of debate as to how they relate to surrounding rock sequences, some geologists placed the Badenoch Group within the Moine Supergroup whilst others described them as simply ‘Moine-like’. Detrital zircon geochronology has allowed the group to be correlated with the Glennfinnan and Loch Eil groups as they all contain zircons that are younger than 950 Ma (million years ago), showing that they postdate the Renlandian Orogeny, a tectonic and thermal event that affected the Morar Group. The group has now been assigned to the Loch Ness Supergroup. The lithologies of these rocks suggest deposition in shallow marine conditions.
