= Morar Group =

- Stratigraphic range: 1000–950 Ma
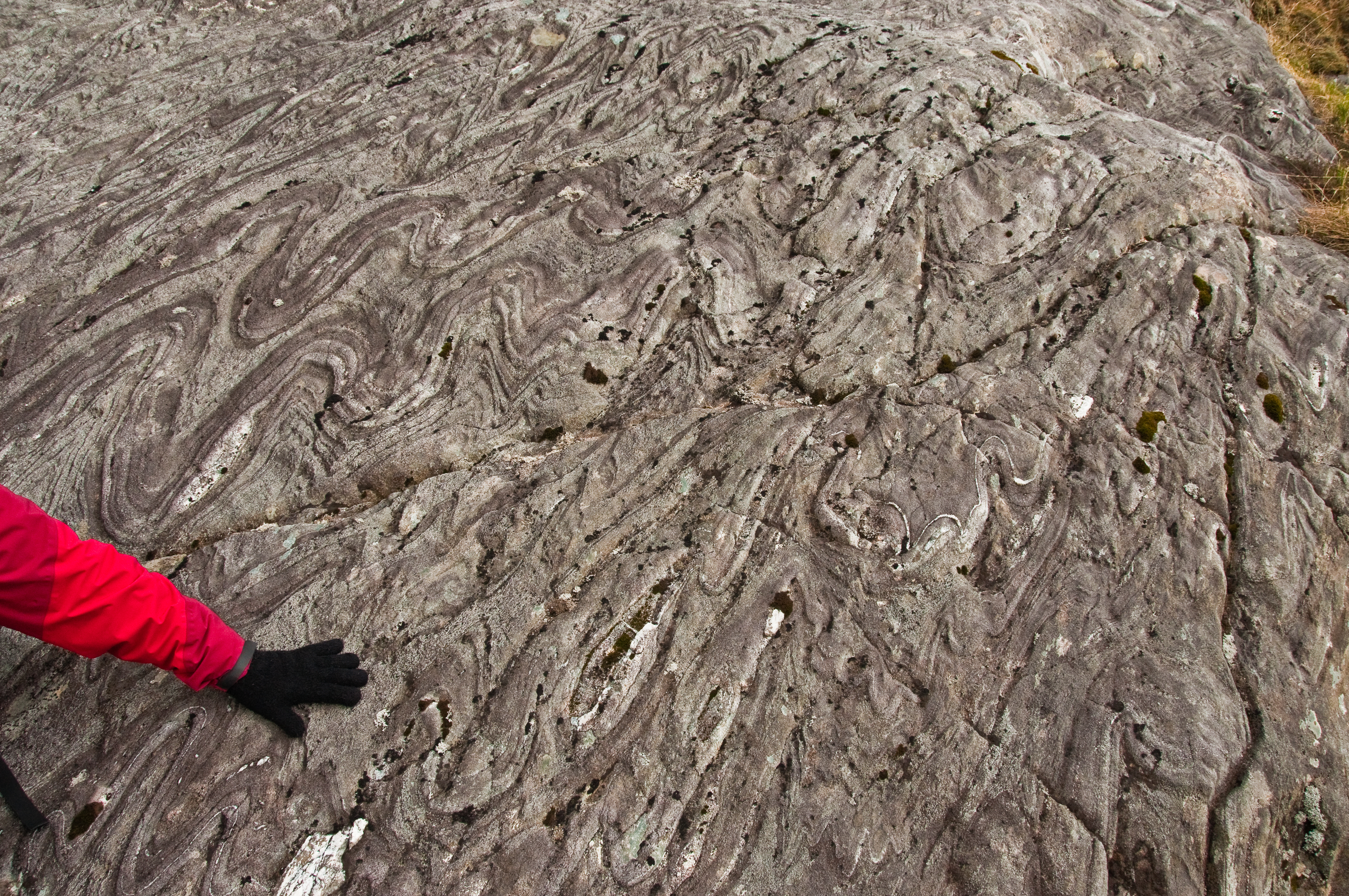
- Folded Morar Schist of the Morar Group, in Glen Meadail near Inverie in Knoydart
- Type: Geological group
- Unit of: Wester Ross Supergroup
- Underlies: Glenfinnan Group (tectonic contact)
- Overlies: Lewisian complex
- Thickness: up to 9,000 metres (29,530 ft)

Lithology
- Primary: Psammite, semi-pelite, pelite
- Other: Conglomerate, breccia

Location
- Country: Scotland

Type section
- Named for: Morar

The Morar Group is a sequence of Tonian (lower Neoproterozoic) sedimentary rocks that have been subjected to a series of tectonic and metamorphic events since their deposition. Originally interpreted to be lowest (oldest) part of a "Moine Supergroup", this sequence now forms part of the Wester Ross Supergroup. They lie unconformably on Archean to Paleoproterozoic basement of the Lewisian complex. The contact with the overlying Glenfinnan Group of the Loch Ness Supergroup is everywhere a tectonic one, formed by the Sgùrr Beag Thrust or related structures.

== Extent ==
The Morar Group outcrops over a large part of the Northwest Highlands, between the Moine Thrust Belt to the northwest to the contact with the Glennfinnan Group, marked by the Sgùrr Beag Thrust or Swordly Thrust, or locally Devonian rocks in southeast Sutherland, to the southeast. It reaches the north coast of Sutherland to the north and extends as far south as the Ross of Mull.

== Stratigraphy ==
The group has been subdivided in several parts of its outcrop. In the Knoydart and Morar areas, a fourfold subdivision is recognised starting from the oldest: Basal Pelite Formation, Lower Morar Psammite Formation, Morar Schists Formation and Upper Morar Psammite Formation. Further north in Ross-shire, extending into Sutherland, the Basal Pelite and the lower part of the Lower Psammite is interpreted to be missing but the sequence is otherwise similar. The Lower Psammite is divided into the lower Altnaharra Psammite Formation, with the Glen Achall Semipelite Member at the top, and the upper Glascarnoch Psammite Formation. The Vaich Pelite Formation is the equivalent of the Morar Schists, and the Crom Psammite Formation is matched to the Upper Psammite. Above this is the Diebidale Pelite Formation. On the Ross of Mull, four formations are recognised: the Lower Shiaba Psammite Formation at the base (no older beds exposed), the Shiaba Pelite Formation, the Upper Shiaba Psammite Formation and the Laggan Mor Formation, which becomes increasingly highly deformed as it approaches its contact with the younger Glennfinnan Group.

== Depositional setting ==
In the lower strain areas there are sufficient sedimentary structures preserved to provide constraints on the depositional environment for the Morar Group. The main challenge has been differentiating between shallow marine shelf and fluvial settings for the deposition of the sequence. For the Ross succession, the Basal Pelite is interpreted to represent deposition in paleovalleys, similar to the Diabaig Formation of the Torridon Group. The Altnaharra Psammite is interpreted to have been deposited as a prograding braid plain, with fluvial deposition being replaced by shoreline deposits that were tidally influenced, before a deeper marine environment developed during the deposition of the Vaich Pelite Formation. This is interpreted to be a single progradation-retrogradation cycle. A second cycle began with a return to shallow water deposition in the lower part of the Crom Psammite Formation, grading upwards to a distal braid plain setting, before returning to a tidal shoreline and eventually to shallow water marine deposition in the Diebidale Pelite Formation.

A very similar pattern of cycles has been deduced for the Torridon Group with which they have been correlated within the Wester Ross Supergroup. Due to movement on the Moine Thrust, the depositional areas of the Torridon and Morar groups are likely to have been separated by more than 100 km. These similarities are consistent with a model in which both sequences were deposited in a foreland basin, with the Torridon Group being more proximal to the mountains of the Grenville Orogen and the Morar Group more distal. Previous models of a rift setting are not consistent with the scale of the sedimentary systems observed, nor are there the expected rapid vertical and lateral changes in sedimentary facies typical of rift basins.

== Age ==
The oldest age of the Morar Group is constrained by the results of detrital zircon geochronology while the youngest age is constrained by the dating of the oldest metamorphic/tectonic event that has affected the group since deposition. The youngest detrital zircon and rutile ages found for samples from the Morar Group are 1070–1000 Ma (million years ago). The oldest metamorphic event known from the Morar Group is that associated with the Renlandian Orogeny, which gives ages of 950–940 Ma, using Lu-Hf and Sm–Nd methods. Together these give an age range of 1000–950 Ma for deposition of the group.

== Structure ==
The structure of the Morar Group varies from south to north. In the southern part of the outcrop, around areas such as Morar, Knoydart and Loch Monar, rocks of this group are often intensely deformed. Loch Monar was the area where John G. Ramsay unravelled the complex history of multiple phases of deformation. The folding involves the Sgùrr Beag Thrust, showing that it postdates the deposition of the Loch Ness Supergroup.

In Sutherland the Morar Group are affected by a series of ductile thrust faults that carry slices of the Altnaharra Psammite, each with a piece of Lewisian-type basement just above the thrust. Between the Moine Thrust and the Swordly Thrust (which is interpreted to form the base to the Glenfinnan Group in this part of the outcrop), there are the Ben Hope Thrust, the Dherue/Achness Thrust, the Naver Thrust and the Torrisdale Thrust.

== Orogenic events ==
At least four orogenic events have been interpreted to affect the Morar Group, in order of age, the Renlandian, the Knoydartian, and the Grampian and Scandian phases of the Caledonian Orogeny. The effects of the Relandian Orogeny have only been recognised locally within the group in northern Sutherland. The age range calculated for garnets sampled in the Meadie Schist is 950–940 Ma at pressure/temperature conditions of 6–7 kb and 600°C. There is much more evidence of Knoydartian orogenesis across the Morar Group outcrop and it seems to have produced major structures. Around the Glenelg inlier, which is formed of Lewisian type gneisses and eclogites of Grenvillian age, the first stage of deformation (D1) within the Morar Group is interpreted to be Knoydartian age south-southeast directed ductile thrusting and related isoclinal folding. The peak metamorphic conditions for the Knoydartian are estimated at about 7 kb and 650°C.

The D1 structures in the Glenelg area are affected by two later phases of folding that have been assigned to late Grampian (D2 460–440 Ma) and Scandian (D3).
