= Sgùrr Beag Thrust =

The Sgùrr Beag Thrust is an important tectonic structure within the Neoproterozoic metasedimentary rock sequences of the Scottish Highlands. The thrust, or similar structures correlated with it, form the boundary between rocks of the Glennfinnan Group and the underlying Morar Group. It divides the Wester Ross Supergroup from the Loch Ness Supergroup. The history of this structure remains poorly understood although it is thought to be at least partly of Caledonian age.

== Extent ==
The Sgùrr Beag Thrust was identified as a zone of high strain in the western part of the Highlands and was originally called the "Sgùrr Beag Slide". It is currently interpreted to extend from the Morvern peninsula in the southwest (with a possible extension onto the Isle of Mull), to the Dornoch Firth where it disappears beneath the Old Red Sandstone. It is often marked by the presence of inliers of Lewisian basement, which are found in its hanging-wall (structurally above the fault plane). In eastern Sutherland there are several thrust structures that could correlate with the Sgùrr Beag Thrust, particularly the Swordly Thrust or the Skinsdale Thrust.

== Age ==
The Loch Ness Supergroup has a depositional age range extending to about 850 Ma (million years ago).There are two main tectonic/metamorphoic events that have affected this sequence since its deposition, the Knoydartian Orogeny (a series of events 820–725 Ma) and the Caledonian Orogeny (consisting of the Grampian Orogeny and the Scandian Phase, mid Ordovician to early Devonian). The age of peak metamorphism within the rocks above the thrust is dated to 840–720 Ma, the timing of the Knoydartian event(s). Some mineral growth is of Scandian age, but it remains unclear as to when the Sgùrr Beag Thrust moved, although there is evidence of two phases of movement, possibly of Knoydartian and Scandian age. A contrast between the pre-Caledonian metamorphic histories of the Morar Group and the Loch Ness Group above the Sgùrr Beag Thrust suggest that the final large-scale movement on the thrust was of Caledonian age.
