= Sleat Group =

- Stratigraphic range: 1000–950
- Type: Geological group
- Unit of: Wester Ross Supergroup
- Sub-units: Rubha Guail Formation, Loch na Dal Formation, Beinn na Seamraig Formation, Kinloch Formation
- Underlies: Torridon Group
- Overlies: Lewisian complex
- Thickness: up to 3,500 metres (11,480 ft)

Location
- Country: Scotland

Type section
- Named for: Sleat

The Sleat Group, which outcrops on the Sleat peninsula on Skye, underlies the Torridon Group conformably, but the relationship with the Stoer Group is nowhere exposed. It is presumed to have been deposited later than the Stoer Group, but possibly in a separate sub-basin. It is metamorphosed to greenschist facies and sits within the Kishorn Nappe, part of the Caledonian thrust belt, making its exact relationship to the other outcrops difficult to assess. The sequence consists of mainly coarse feldspathic sandstones deposited in a fluvial environment with some less common grey shales, probably deposited in a lacustrine environment.

== Stratigraphy ==
=== Rubha Guail Formation ===
The unconformity at the base of the Sleat Group is not exposed on Skye, but at Kyle of Lochalsh, the basal part of the sequence is seen to consist of breccias, with clasts derived from the underlying gneiss. Topographic relief on the unconformity reaches several hundred metres. Most of the remaining part of the formation consists of coarse green trough cross-bedded sandstones, the colour coming from its content of epidote and chlorite. The coarse sandstone beds are interbedded with fine-grained sandstones and siltstones, which become more common towards the top of the formation. The siltstones show desiccation features. The formation shows an overall upward-fining trend, which continued with the overlying Loch na Dal Formation siltstones.

=== Loch na Dal Formation ===
The basal part of this formation is formed of laminated dark-grey siltstones. This 200 m thick unit is often phosphatic and contains occasional coarse to very coarse sandstone laminae. It is interpreted to represent the maximum expansion of a lake. The upper part of the formation is composed mainly of coarse, occasionally pebbly, trough cross-bedded sandstones, interpreted to record the building out of a series of deltas into the earlier lake.

=== Beinn na Seamraig Formation ===
This formation consist of coarse-grained cross-bedded sandstones, typically showing contorted bedding.

=== Kinloch Formation ===
This formation is similar to the underlying Beinn na Seamraig Formation. The main difference is that the sandstones are generally finer-grained than those below and have better developed ripple-drift lamination. The sediments show marked cyclicity, with fining upward cycles, 25–35 m thick, with shales developed at the top. The uppermost boundary of this group with the overlying Torridon Group has been interpreted to be conformable, with evidence of interfingering between the Kinloch Formation shales and Applecross Formation sandstones. In support of this observation, there are no sandstone clasts above the boundary and no change in magnetisation between the formations. The main difference is in the degree of albitisation of the feldspars; those in the Sleat Group are only partially affected, while those in the Applecross Formation are completely albitised. There is also some evidence for a change in bedding orientation across the boundary, which is nowhere well-exposed, suggesting that it may represent some sort of disconformity.
