= Wester Ross Supergroup =

- Stratigraphic range: 1000–960 Ma
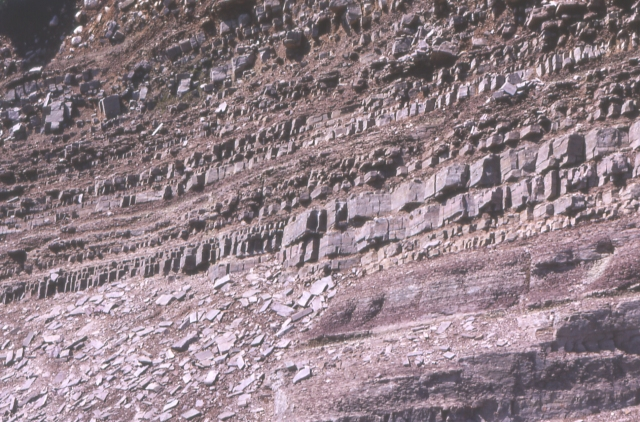
- Torridon Group sandstones near Diabaig
- Type: Geological supergroup
- Sub-units: Sleat Group, Torridon Group, Morar Group, Iona Group, Tarskavaig Group
- Underlies: Ardvreck Group or Loch Ness Supergroup (tectonic contact)
- Overlies: Lewisian complex or Stoer Group
- Area: Northwestern Scotland
- Thickness: 6–9 km

Lithology
- Primary: Sandstone (psammite where metamorphosed)
- Other: Conglomerate, mudstone (pelite where metamorphosed)

Type section
- Named for: Wester Ross

The Wester Ross Supergroup is one of the subdivisions of the Neoproterozoic sequence of sedimentary rocks (or their metamorphic equivalents) in the Scottish Highlands. It lies unconformably on medium to high-grade metamorphic rocks and associated igneous rocks of the Archaean and Paleoproterozoic age Lewisian complex or locally over the Mesoproterozoic sedimentary rocks of the Stoer Group. The contact between the Wester Ross Supergroup and the next youngest of the Neoproterozoic sequences in the Scottish Highlands, the Loch Ness Supergroup, is everywhere a tectonic one.

== Stratigraphy ==
The Wester Ross Supergroup consists of several groups that are geographically or structurally isolated from each other. The certainty of the correlation between the groups is variable, with the Torridon, Sleat and Morar groups considered as very likely to be lateral equivalents of each other, while the Iona and Tarskavaig groups and those on Shetland are likely but not proven.

=== Torridon Group ===
The Torridon Group is the main part of what used to be termed the "Torridonian", although that also included the Stoer Group, which is now known to be a completely separate and older sequence.

=== Sleat Group ===
The Sleat Group, which outcrops on the Sleat peninsula on Skye, underlies the Torridon Group conformably, but the relationship with the Stoer Group is nowhere exposed. It is metamorphosed to greenschist facies and sits within the Kishorn Nappe, part of the Caledonian thrust belt, making its exact relationship to the other outcrops difficult to assess. The sequence consists of mainly coarse feldspathic sandstones deposited in a fluvial environment with some less common grey shales, probably deposited in a lacustrine environment.

=== Morar Group ===
This sequence of variably metamorphosed and deformed sandstones (psammites) was originally considered as separate from the "Torridonian" and formed the lower section of the Moine Supergroup. Comparisons between the Torridon Group with areas of lower strain in the Morar Group have found many similarities in lithology, thickness and interpreted depositional environment. This group is now thought to have been deposited as part of the same depositional basin, a foreland basin developed in front of the mountain belt formed by the Grenville Orogeny.

=== Iona Group ===
The Iona Group is exposed on the island of Iona and consists of two units separated by a zone of mylonite. The group has been assigned to the Wester Ross Supergroup based on its structural position beneath the Moine Thrust Zone and the ages of detrital zircons, which are similar to those found in the Sleat Group.

=== Tarskavaig Group ===
Rocks of the Tarskavaig Group lie above the Tarskavaig Thrust on the southwestern end of the Sleat peninsula. The group consists of a mixture of psammites, semi-pelites and pelites, which are deformed and no sedimentological analysis has been carried out, nor have the group been sampled for detrital zircons. From its structural position it has been tentatively correlated with the lower part of the supergroup.

=== Shetland ===
The Westing, Sand Voe and Yell Sound groups on Shetland are tentatively correlated with other groups within the Wester Ross Supergroup based on lithological similarities, the ages of the youngest detrital zircons and the timing of later metamorphism.

== Age ==
The age of this sequence is constrained by a combination of detrital zircon geochronology and by the dating of later metamorphic events. The youngest detrital zircon and rutile ages are in the range 1070–1000 Ma, providing an upper bound. Metamorphic ages of 950–940 Ma have been calculated for garnets from the lower part of the Morar Group, confirming that these rocks were affected by the Renlandian Orogeny (960–920 Ma) and providing a lower bound. Together these data give a depositional age range of 1000–960 Ma.

== Depositional setting ==
The Sleat and Torridon groups have been interpreted as deposited in a rift setting. However the scale of the interpreted river systems that deposited the Torridon Group rocks and the consistency in the paleocurrent directions suggest that most of the sequence was deposited in a single basin. This is also true for the Morar Group, which has very similar thickness, sedimentary facies and interpreted paleocurrents to the Torridon Group. Combined with the detrital zircons that indicate a dominantly Grenvillian source, this has led to a reinterpretation that the supergroup was deposited within a foreland basin, in front of the mountains formed by the Grenville Orogeny.
