= Stac Fada Member =

Impact remnant in Scotland

- Stratigraphic range: latest Mesoproterozoic-earliest Neoproterozoic (latest Stenian- earliest Tonian) 990 ± 22
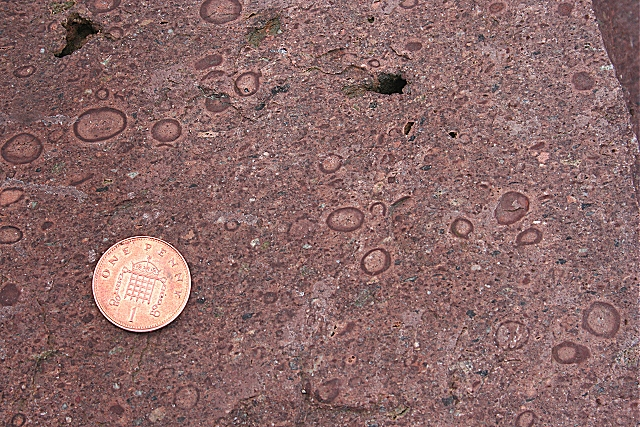
- Accretionary lapilli from the Stac Fada Member at Enard Bay, with a British penny for scale (diameter 20.3 mm)
- Type: Member
- Unit of: Bay of Stoer Formation, Stoer Group
- Underlies: Poll a' Mhuilt Member
- Thickness: 10–15 m (35–50 ft)

Location
- Coordinates: 58.05°N 5.35°W
- Region: Scotland
- Country: United Kingdom
- Extent: 50 km (30 mi) along the coast of NW Scotland

Type section
- Named for: Stac Fada, a small promontory west of Stoer
- Stac Fada Member (the United Kingdom) Stac Fada Member (Scotland)

The Stac Fada Member is a distinctive layer towards the top of the Mesoproterozoic Bay of Stoer Formation, part of the Stoer Group (lowermost Torridonian Supergroup) in northwest Scotland. This rock unit is generally 10 to 15 metres (35 to 50 ft) thick and is made of sandstone that contains accretionary lapilli and many dark green glassy fragments of mafic composition.

The member records evidence for an impact event in the near vicinity (likely in the Minch or near Lairg), dating to around 1 billion years ago.

The name comes from a small promontory to the west of the village of Stoer, in Assynt, Sutherland (at 58.201°N 5.349°W).

== Extent ==
The Stac Fada Member is exposed at a series of localities on or near the coast of Wester Ross, extending for about 50 km (30 mi) from the western side of Loch Ewe in the south to the Stoer peninsula in the north.

== Description ==
The Stac Fada Member is an impactite consisting of a mixture of suevite and clast poor impact melt rocks. At the Stoer peninsula, the basal part of the unit contains large clasts of sandstone within a matrix of melt rocks. At the same locality, lenses of accretionary lapilli are developed in the uppermost part of the unit, although these are better developed at Enard Bay. The thickness of the unit is quite variable, although it generally lies in the range 10–15 metres. At the southern end of Loch Ewe it is only 5–6 metres thick, while at Bac an Leth Choin, southwest of Loch Ewe across the Loch Maree Fault, it reaches more than 30 metres.

The unit contains clasts of melted material, although these are unevenly distributed through the sequence. Clasts derived from the Lewisian complex are locally common and samples have been taken to establish which terrane within the Lewisian the samples came from based on their geochemistry.

Isotopic analysis suggests that the impactor was chondritic in nature, and that the surface rock that was hit during the impact included mafic/ultramafic material.

== Interpretation ==
The unit was initially interpreted by the Geological Survey to be a conglomerate with clasts derived from mafic dykes. Later interpretations invoked a volcanic origin for the unit, based on the presence of pieces of green devitrified glass, with pyroclastic flow, peperite, tuff and lahar all being proposed. When shocked quartz, a higher-than-expected concentration of platinum-group metals and the presence of a non-terrestrial chromium isotope were all identified in the unit, it was reinterpreted as part of an impact ejecta blanket. Evidence for a meteorite impact close to Ullapool was published by a combined team of scientists from the University of Oxford and the University of Aberdeen, in March 2008. Additional evidence for an impact origin for the deposit comes from the identification of the mineral reidite as lamellae in zircon grains, indicating pressures of at least 30 GPa.

Authigenic potassium feldspar, found in vesicular pipes associated with the degassing of the unit immediately after emplacement, have been dated using the argon–argon dating method. Specimens from four localities give very similar results, indicating an age of 1177 ± 5 Ma (millions of years ago) for the formation of this deposit. However, a later analysis of shocked zircon crystals using uranium–lead dating found the age to be somewhat younger, around 990 ± 22 million years ago.

The crater, preserved under sedimentary layers of sandstone, is currently presumed to either lie to the west under the Minch, the waterway that separates the Isle of Lewis in the Outer Hebrides from the north-west Highlands of Scotland, or to be the cause of the Lairg Gravity Low, beneath the Moine Thrust Belt to the east. It has been estimated that the crater is about 13–14 kilometres (8–9 mi) across. The impact would have created a blast with the energy of 145,000 megatons and the shock wave would have created winds of 420 kilometres per hour (260 mph) as far away as the site of modern Aberdeen.

In order to reduce the uncertainty in the location of the impact, the main exposures of the Stac Fada Member have been re-examined to look for evidence of the direction that the ejecta from the impact was moving as it was deposited. The orientation of small-scale thrust faults and folds and striae found locally at the base of the unit have been combined with measurements of the fabric in the rocks using anisotropy of magnetic susceptibility. These observations are most consistent with an impact location in the Minch, rather than at Lairg. The presence of large sandstone clasts in the outcrops on the Stoer peninsula suggests that this was the area most proximal to the impact. The Minch location is also consistent with the observed types of clasts of Lewisian gneiss found.

== See also ==
- Silverpit crater, the only other proposed impact crater in or near the British Isles
- Impact event
- List of impact craters on Earth
- List of possible impact structures on Earth
- North West Highlands Geopark
- Geology of Scotland
