= Iona Group =

- Stratigraphic range: 1000–950 Ma
- Type: Group
- Unit of: Wester Ross Supergroup
- Thickness: ~700 m

Lithology
- Primary: metasandstone
- Other: metasiltstone, semipelite, mylonite, conglomerate

Location
- Region: Inner Hebrides
- Country: Scotland

Type section
- Named for: Iona

The Iona Group is a sequence of metamorphosed Neoproterozoic sedimentary rocks that outcrop along the east coast of the island of Iona within the Inner Hebrides of Scotland. The name was given to this sequence by Stewart in 1969, keeping it distinct from the Torridonian, which it resembles. Since c. 2021, it has been assigned to the Wester Ross Supergroup.

Three divisions are recognised; i) interbedded metasandstones and metasiltstones, ii) slaty semipelites and iii) conglomerates, the clasts of which are largely metamorphic in origin. The rock strata are steeply inclined to vertical.
