= Torridon Group =

Group of sedimentary rocks in Scotland

- Stratigraphic range: 1000-960 Ma
- Type: Group
- Thickness: 4,000–6,000 m

Lithology
- Primary: Sandstone
- Other: Conglomerate, breccia, shale

Location
- Country: Scotland, United Kingdom

Type section
- Named for: Loch Torridon

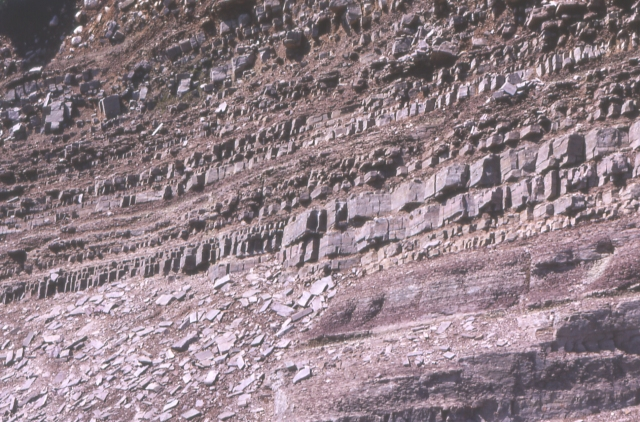
Layers of sandstone of the Diabaig Formation exposed near Diabaig

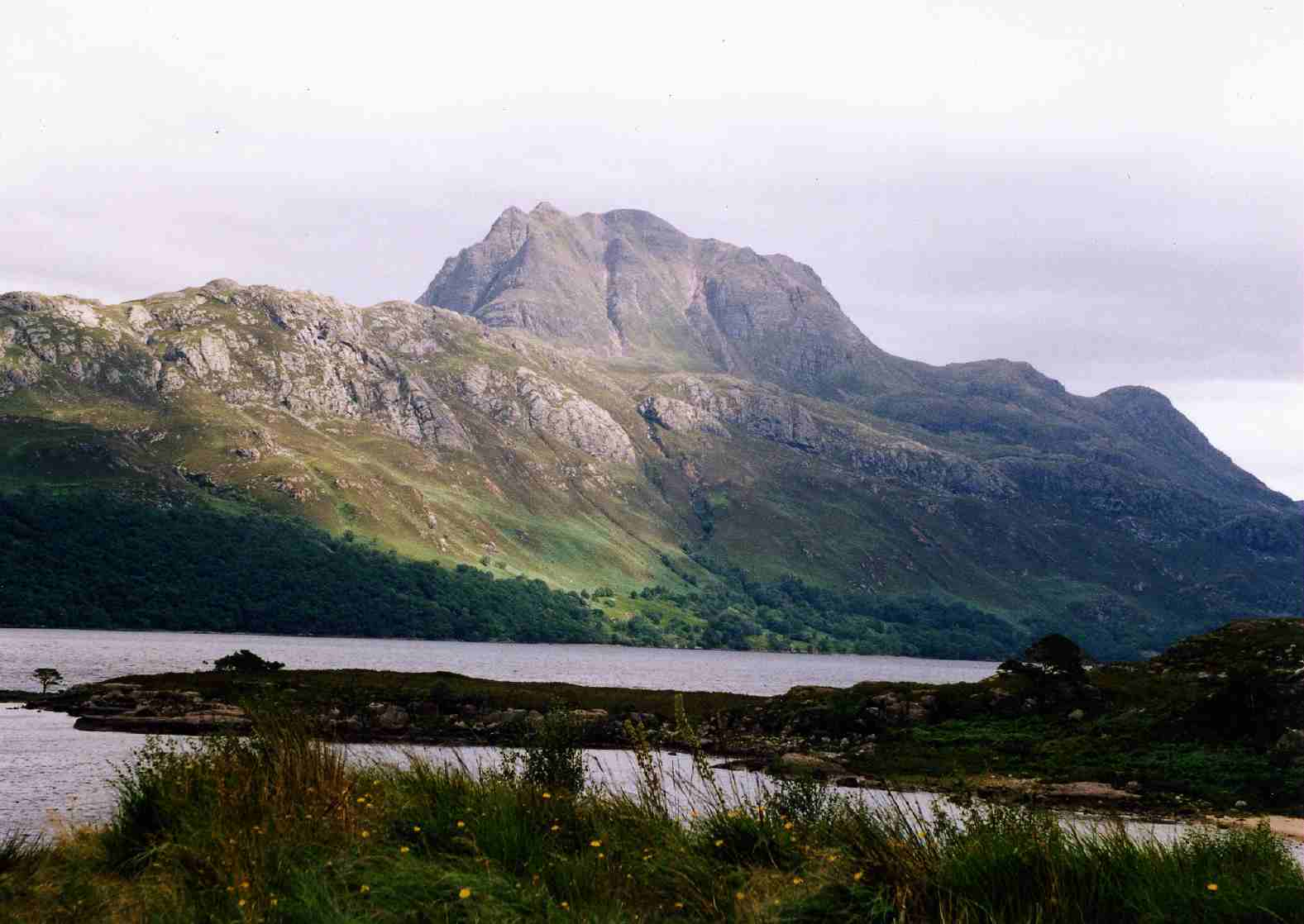
Slioch formed of Torridon Group sandstones lying on an irregular unconformity over Lewisian gneiss, seen in the middle and foreground around Loch Maree

The Torridon Group is a series of Tonian (lower Neoproterozoic) arenaceous and argillaceous sedimentary rocks, which occur extensively in the Northwest Highlands of Scotland. These strata are particularly well exposed in the district of upper Loch Torridon, a circumstance which suggested the name Torridon Sandstone, first applied to these rocks by James Nicol. Stratigraphically, they lie unconformably on gneisses of the Lewisian complex and sandstones of the lithologically similar Mesoproterozoic Stoer Group and their outcrop extent is restricted to the Hebridean terrane.

== Lithology ==
The dominant lithology of the Torridon Group is red and brown sandstone, often arkosic, with subsidiary amounts of shale, particularly towards the top of the sequence, with coarse conglomerates and breccias locally at the base. Some of the materials of these rocks were derived from the underlying Lewisian gneiss, upon the uneven surface of which they rest, but the bulk of the material was sourced from rocks that are nowhere now exposed. Upon this ancient denuded land surface the Torridon Group sequence rests horizontally or with gentle dip. Some of the peaks, such as Beinn Eighe, are capped with white Cambrian quartzite, giving them a distinctive appearance when seen from afar. Some of the quartzite contains fossilized worm burrows and is known as pipe rock, which is approximately 500 million years old. The Torridon Group landscape is itself highly denuded by glacial and alluvial action.

== Occurrence ==
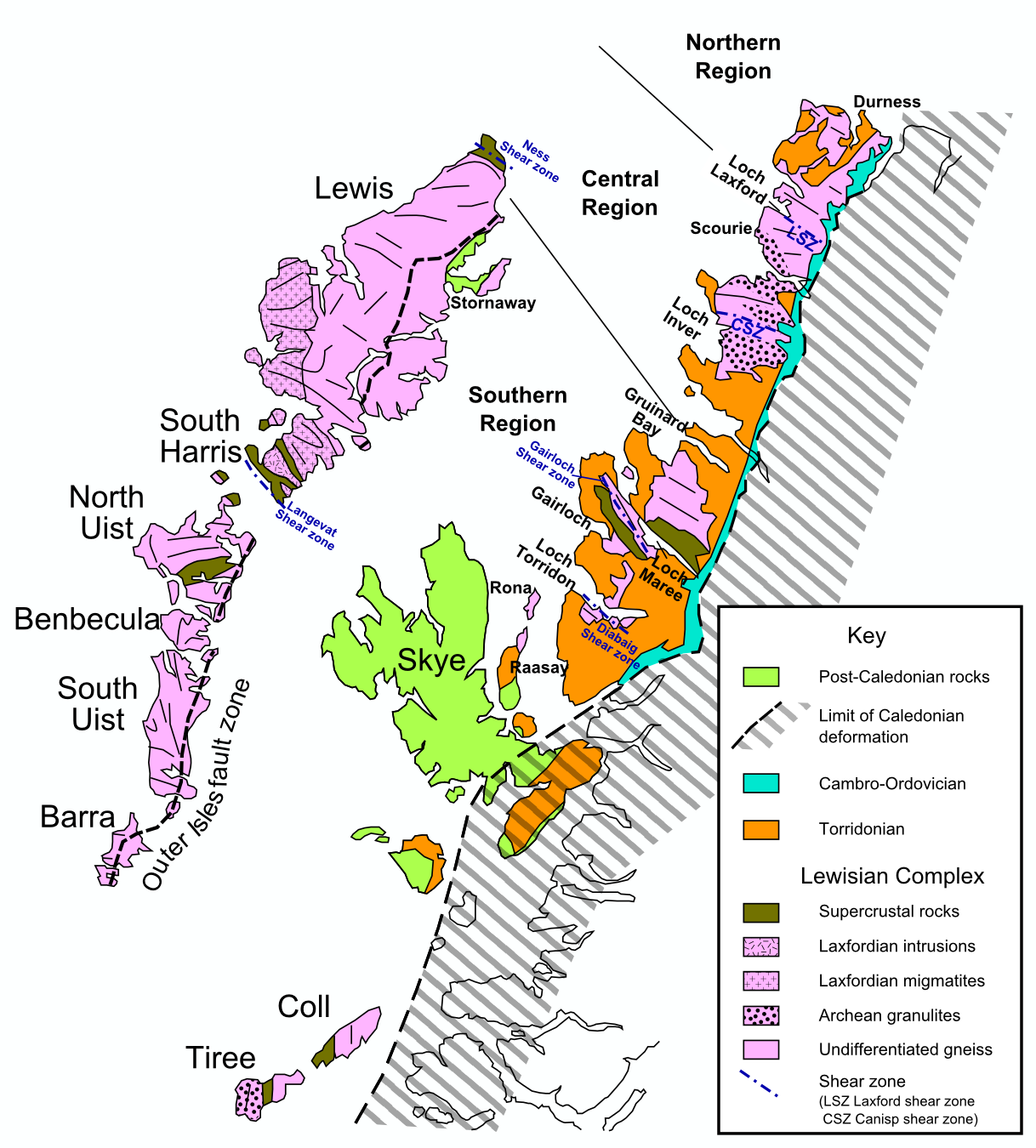
Geological map of the Hebridean terrane showing distribution of Torridonian sediments

Their outcrop extends in a belt of variable breadth from Cape Wrath to the Point of the peninsula of Sleat in Skye, running in a NNE–SSW direction through Caithness, Sutherland, Ross and Cromarty, and Skye and Lochalsh. They form the isolated mountain peaks of Canisp, Quinag and Suilven in the area of Loch Assynt, of Slioch near Loch Maree, and other hills. They attain their maximum development in the Applecross, Gairloch and Torridon districts, form the greater part of Scalpay, and occur also in Rùm, Raasay, Soay and the Crowlin Islands. They are also found beneath much of the Sea of the Hebrides overlying the Lewisian gneiss.

== Sub-divisions ==
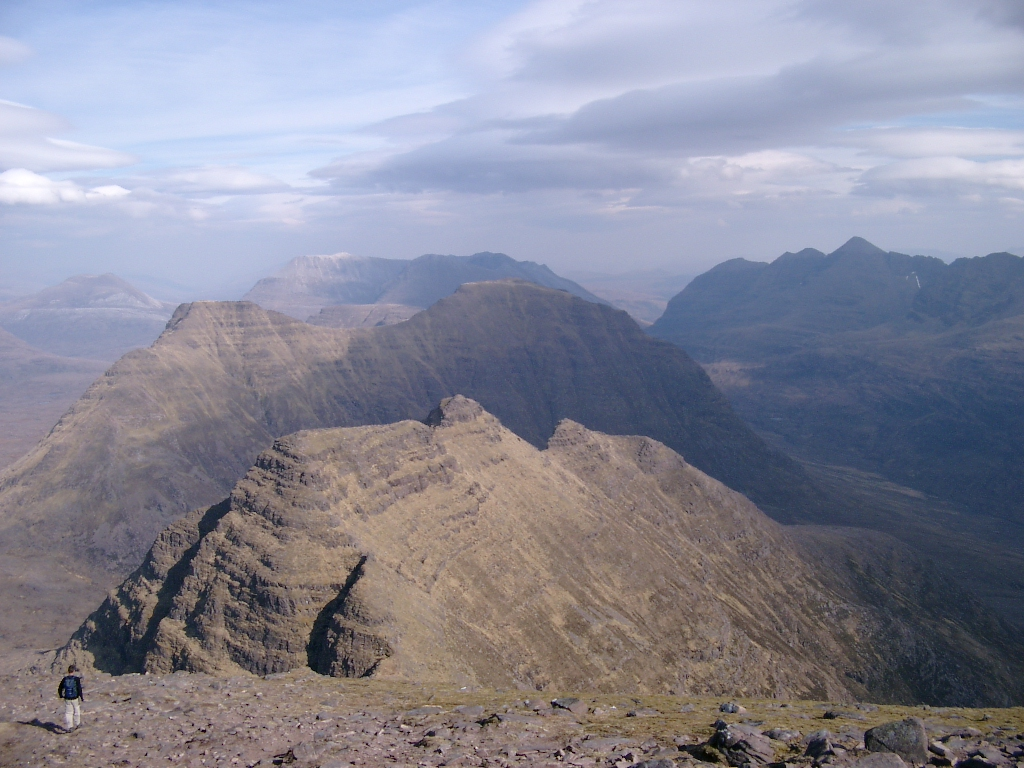
Horizontally bedded sandstones of the Torridon Group, forming the Horns of Beinn Alligin

The Torridon Group is divided into four formations, the Diabaig, Applecross, Aultbea and Cailleach Head formations. The Torridon Group infills an irregular land surface with up to 600 m of topography locally, cutting down through the previously deposited Stoer group sediments, resting in many areas directly on the Lewisian. It has been suggested that there is significant unconformity within this group, between the Diabaig and Applecross Formations.

=== Diabaig Formation ===
The lowest part of this formation consists of a basal breccia containing clasts derived from the underlying Lewisian complex with the thickest developments in the paleovalleys. The breccias pass vertically and laterally into tabular sandstones. These are locally channelised and interfinger with grey shales containing thin beds of fine-grained sandstone with wave rippled surfaces. The shales show the effects of desiccation with mudcracks preserved by being filled by overlying sandstone layers. In the upper part of the formation, beds of massive sandstone with sharp bases appear, becoming more common and thicker bedded towards the top. Ripple-drift lamination at the top of the sandstone layers indicates deposition from easterly-flowing currents. This sequence is interpreted to be to represent the progressive infill of the topography by alluvial fans building out into ephemeral lakes. The more massive beds are interpreted to be lake turbidites.

=== Applecross Formation ===
This formation consists of coarse sandstones, both trough and planar cross-bedded. The orientation of the troughs suggest a paleocurrent flowing from the Northwest. The sandstones carry a distinctive set of pebbles, including jasper and porphyry. Most of the sandstone beds are affected by soft-sediment deformation structures suggesting liquefaction, possibly as a result of seismic activity. The uppermost part of the formation consists of finer-grained sandstones, transitional to those of the overlying Aultbea Formation. At Cape Wrath the basal part of the formation shows a fanning of paleocurrent directions consistent with deposition from a large alluvial fan (~40 km radius) with its apex near the Minch Fault. The source area for this fan has been calculated as about 10,000 km^{2}.

=== Aultbea Formation ===
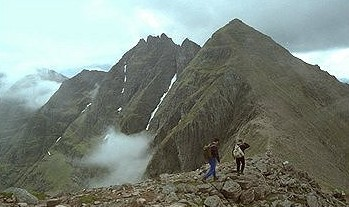
Sgurr Fiona and the Corrag Bhuidhe pinnacles on An Teallach

This formation is similar to the Applecross formation except that the sandstones are fine to medium-grained and there are very few pebbles. Almost all of these sandstone beds show the contortions shown by the older formation. The Applecross and Aultbea Formations together consist of an overall fining-upward sequence of sandstones. Only the outcrops at Cape Wrath described above have a consistent radial pattern suggesting that the sequence was deposited in a bajada environment, by a series of smaller fans merging to form a braided river system.

=== Cailleach Head Formation ===
This formation is similar to the underlying Aultbea Formation, the main difference being in grain size, with this formation being noticeably finer-grained. The sequence is made up of 22 m thick cycles, each with a basal erosion surface followed by dark grey shales with desiccation cracks, planar cross-bedded sandstones with wave rippled tops, overlain by trough cross-bedded micaceous sandstones. These cycles are thought to represent repeated progradation of deltas into a lake. A lack of evaporite minerals suggest that the lakes had through drainage. Acritarch microfossils were described from here by Teall in 1907, the first Precambrian fossils described in Britain.

== Age ==
The upper age limit for the deposition of this sequence is constrained by the age of the last tectonic and metamorphic event to affect the Lewisian complex and the depositional age of the Stoer Group on which it was deposited, for which ages cluster between about 1200–1100 Ma. The lower limit is provided by the age of the lower Cambrian quartzite that lies above it, about 544 Ma. Radiometric ages from the basal part of the Torridon Group sequence itself give ages of about 1000–950 Ma. This implies an age gap of at least 200 Ma between the deposition of the Stoer and Torridon groups, consistent with the paleomagnetic evidence of a major break. Ages of detrital zircons also provide some constraints on the sequence age. The lower part of the Sleat Group show ages consistent with derivation from Scourian and to a lesser extent Laxfordian rocks, with no dates after 1700 Ma. The upper part of the Sleat Group includes a large component of broadly Laxfordian age with almost no Archaean ages, with a lower limit of about 1200 Ma. In contrast the Diabaig Formation shows a small group clustered around 1100 Ma, the age of the Grenville Orogeny. In the Applecross and Aultbea Formations there are many more zircons giving ages around 1100 Ma and even below 1000 Ma.

== Depositional setting ==
Variations in thickness and lithology in the Sleat and Torridon Groups were interpreted as reflecting deposition in a rift setting. Evidence from seismic reflection data in the Minch suggests that the Minch Fault was active throughout the deposition of the Torridon Group. This is consistent with the generally westerly derived pebbly material throughout the thickness of the Applecross Formation, suggesting a constantly rejuvenated sediment source in that direction. More recent work has suggested that although the Sleat Group was probably deposited in a rift setting, the scale and continuity of the Torridon Group, particularly the Applecross and Aultbea Formations, is more consistent with a molasse type setting possibly related to the Grenville Orogeny, within a foreland basin.

== See also ==
- Torridonian
