= Lairg Gravity Low =

Gravity anomaly in Scotland

Lairg gravity low
- Scotland crater
- Location within Scotland
- Location: Lairg, Scotland, Sutherland, Scotland; 58°1′12″N 4°24′0″W

Impact crater structure
- Confidence: Possible
- Diameter: 40 kilometres (25 mi)
- Age: 1200 Myr Mesoproterozoic
- Exposed: No
- Drilled: No

The Lairg gravity low is a possible impact crater in Scotland about 40 kilometres in diameter, with a centre near the town of Lairg in the Scottish Highlands. Its identity as an impact crater is suspected due to the impact deposits present in the Stac Fada Member 50 km to the west. However, this has been disputed, with other studies suggesting that an impact in The Minch is more likely.

== Description ==
Relative to the residual gravity field, at the centre it is 23 mGal lower than the surrounding terrain. The gravity anomaly is approximately 40 km across, and somewhat irregularly shaped towards the edges. It is quite similar to that of the Ries impact crater. A detailed analysis of the gravity data found that the anomaly has no central uplift as would be expected of a crater of this size, though it possessed anomalies that was suggested represented a peak ring. The authors proposed that the anomaly was an eroded remnant of a larger (~ 100 km diameter) crater, which would explain the anomalies. The authors also suggested that the impact originally took place further east, but had been moved westward by subsequent tectonic movements.

== Correlation to the Stac Fada Member ==
It is suspected that the Lairg site is the source of the ejecta deposits in the Stac Fada Member for a number of reasons. The palaeocurrent direction data across the N-S extent of the member changes and always points away from the site of the gravity low. The upper levels of target sediment were unconsolidated sand and basement felsic gneiss, according to the lithic fragments in the member. However a 2019 study disputed this based on the fact that the matrix of the Stac Fada Member had been derived from local Stoer Group sediments and the regional variation in the anisotropy of magnetic susceptibility, direction of compression and striations from the Stac Fada Member suggested that an impact somewhere in The Minch was more probable.
