= Knoydartian Orogeny =

The Knoydartian Orogeny is a Tonian (early Neoproterozoic) tectonic and metamorphic event, or group of events, that is recognised in the rocks of the Wester Ross and Loch Ness supergroups of the Scottish Highlands. It is dated to about 820–725 Ma (million years ago), predating the deposition of the Cryogenian to Cambrian Dalradian Supergroup. It is named after Knoydart, one of the localities where the event was first recognised.

== Identification ==
Evidence for a Precambrian event affecting Moine rocks (as then understood) came from the identification of a set of "older" pegmatites, thought to predate Caledonian tectonic and metamorphic effects, in a number of localities, including Morar and Knoydart, in the 1960s. The terms "Morarian" and Knoydartian" were both used to describe this event. It was dated to about 740 Ma (million years ago).

As more dating was carried out on samples covering a larger geographical area, using techniques with significantly greater precision, the full age range of 820–725 Ma became apparent. The dates produced also show clustering, suggesting that the Knoydartian consisted of several separate tectonothermal events.

An upper age limit for the Knoydartian is provided by the dating of igneous bodies that intrude the Glenfinnan and Loch Eil groups of the Loch Ness Supergroup to about 870 Ma. These intrusions are affected by all of the Knoydartian tectonic effects that also deform their host rocks.

== Interpretation ==
The Knoydartian occurred during the existence of the supercontinent Rodinia. There is no general agreement as to the position of northern Scotland within Rodinia but some models locate it close to a postulated convergent margin. In such a model, the Knoydartian is an orogeny related to continuing subduction, possibly as a result of arc accretion. Together with the proposed earlier Renlandian Orogeny, which occurred at about 960–920 Ma, this sequence of orogenic events is sometimes referred to as the Valhalla Orogeny.
