= Maturity (sedimentology) =

In sedimentary geology, maturity describes the composition and texture of grains in clastic rocks, most typically sandstones, resulting from different amounts of sediment transportation. A sediment is mature when the grains in a sediment become well-sorted and well-rounded due to weathering or abrasion of the grains during transport. There are two components to describe maturity, texture and composition. Texture describes how rounded and sorted the sample is while composition describes how much the composition trends toward stable minerals and components (often quartz).

A mature sediment is more uniform in appearance, for the sediment grains are well rounded, are of a similar size and exhibit little compositional variation. Conversely, an immature sediment contains more angular grains, diverse grain sizes, and is compositionally diverse.

As the sediment is transported, the unstable minerals are abraded or dissolved to leave more stable minerals, such as quartz. Mature sediments, which contain stable minerals, generally have a smaller variety of minerals than immature sediments, which can contain both stable and unstable minerals. One measure of this maturity is the ZTR index which is a measure of the common resistant minerals found in ultra-weathered sediments: zircon, tourmaline, and rutile.

A sediment sample from the lower (downstream) portions of a stream is likely to be more mature than one found upstream, since the original sediment has been subject to more abrasion as it travels downstream.

== See also ==
- Maturity (geology)
