= Ardvreck Group =

- Stratigraphic range: Lower Cambrian
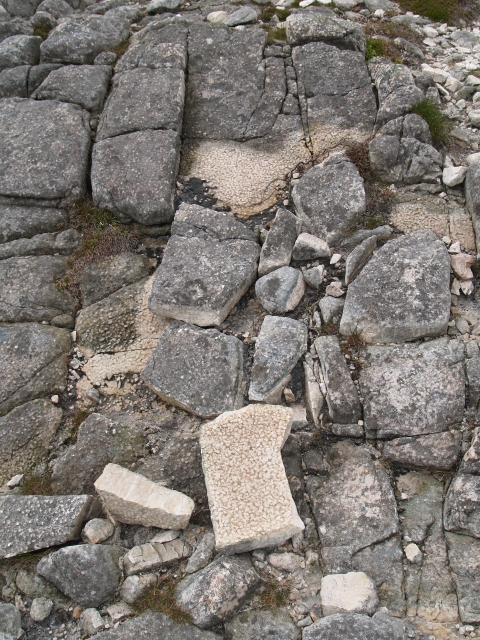
- Quartz arenite with skolithos burrows, the Pipe Rock of the upper Eriboll formation, viewed on a bedding surface
- Type: Group
- Sub-units: Eriboll formation, An-t-Sron formation
- Underlies: Durness Group
- Overlies: Lewisian complex or Torridon Group
- Thickness: up to 142 m

Lithology
- Primary: quartzite, quartz arenite

Location
- Region: Hebridean terrane
- Country: Scotland
- Extent: Northwest Highlands

Type section
- Named for: Ardvreck Castle

The Ardvreck Group is a stratigraphic group of early Cambrian age found in the Northwest Highlands of Scotland. It lies unconformably on gneisses of the Lewisian complex or sandstones of the Torridon Group. It consists of two formations, the basal quartzites and quartz arenites of the Eriboll formation and the overlying dolomitic siltstones and sandstones and quartz arenites of the An-t-Sron formation. It is overlain conformably by the Ghrudaidh formation of the Durness Group. The Ardvreck Group was at one time known as the "Eriboll Group".
