= Hebridean terrane =

Part of the Caledonian orogenic belt in northwest Scotland

Coordinates: 57.66°N 6.31°W

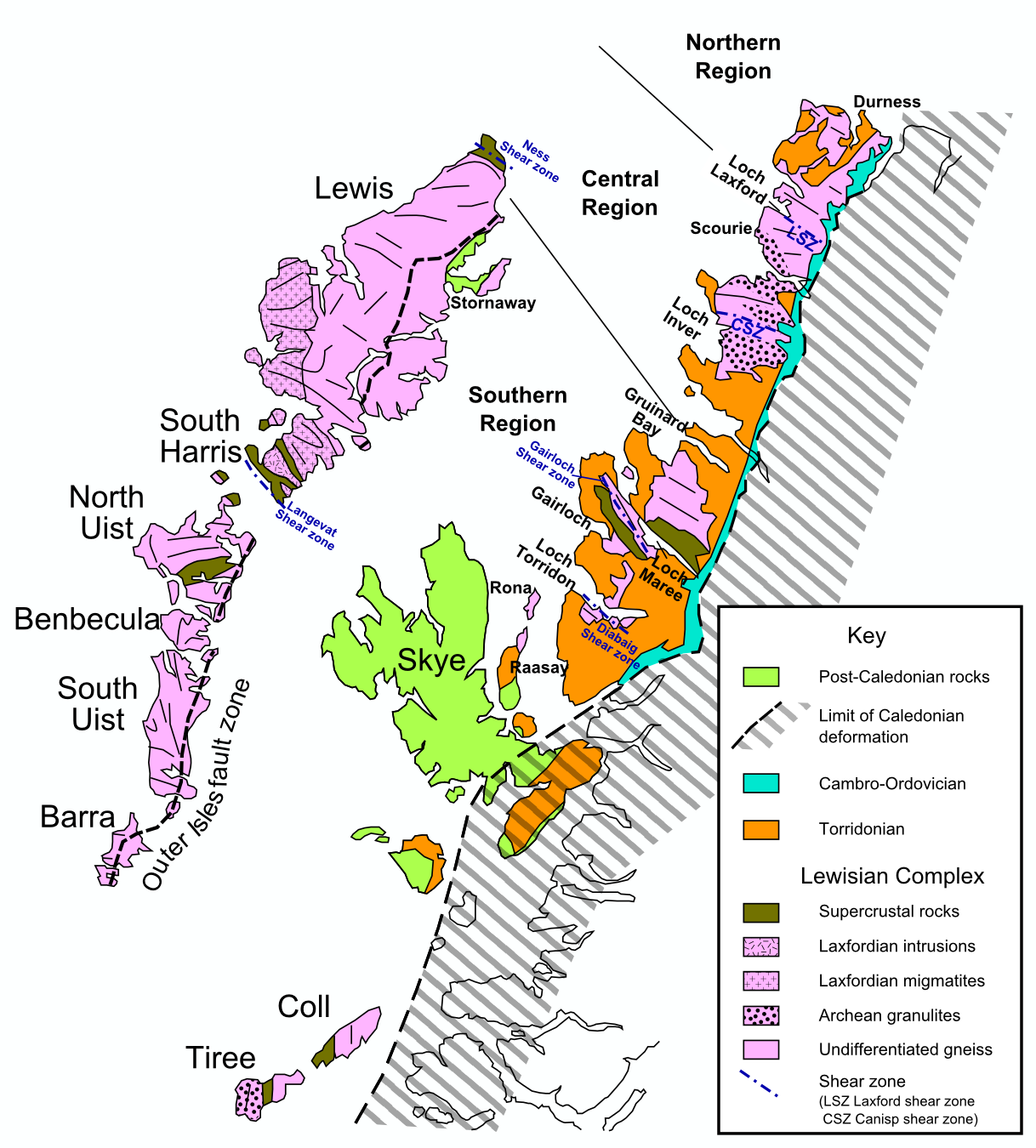
Geological map of the Hebridean Terrane

The Hebridean terrane is one of the terranes that form part of the Caledonian orogenic belt in northwest Scotland. Its boundary with the neighbouring Northern Highland terrane is formed by the Moine Thrust Belt. The basement is formed by Archaean and Paleoproterozoic gneisses of the Lewisian complex, unconformably overlain by the Neoproterozoic Torridonian sediments, which in turn are unconformably overlain by a sequence of Cambro–Ordovician sediments. It formed part of the Laurentian foreland during the Caledonian continental collision.

== Extent ==
The Hebridean terrane forms the westernmost strip of mainland Scotland, most of the Inner Hebrides and all of the Outer Hebrides. Similar rocks are also thought to be present in Shetland and have been proved west and north of the Outer Hebrides by BGS shallow boreholes and hydrocarbon exploration wells. The full extent of this terrane to the west is obscured by the effects of Mesozoic rifting.

== Rock units ==
=== Lewisian complex ===
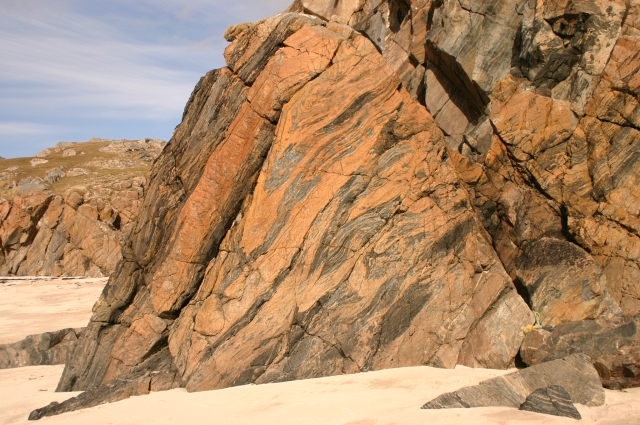
Outcrop of weathered Lewisian gneiss, 5 km NW of Loch Inver

The Lewisian complex consists of mainly granitic gneisses, subject to a series of metamorphic and tectonic events, interrupted by the intrusion of a major dyke swarm.

==== Scourian complex ====
The protoliths for the Scourian complex were mainly granitic plutonic rocks intruded in the interval 3.0–2.7 Ga. They were metamorphosed to granulite facies and deformed towards the end of the Archaean. At the beginning of the Proterozoic, the Scourian gneisses were locally affected by deformation and retrogression to amphibolite facies in the Inverian event, which overlapped in time with the emplacement of the Scourie dykes.

==== Scourie dykes ====
This swarm of mainly dolerite dykes, postdates the Scourian deformation and metamorphism and has therefore been used to identify the later Laxfordian event. Many of the dykes were intruded into hot country rock.

==== Laxfordian event ====
This event is associated with the development of shear zones, in which the Scourie dykes occur as concordant amphibolite sheets. This deformation was accompanied by retrogression to amphibolite facies and subsequently locally to greenschist facies.

=== Torridonian sediments ===
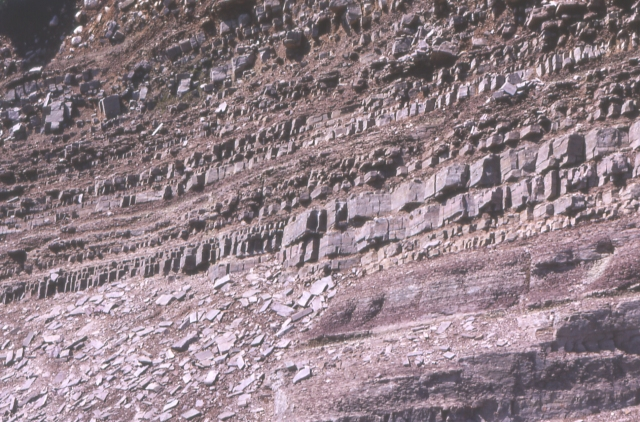
Well-bedded Torridonian sandstone

The Torridonian is a sequence of Neoproterozoic sediments, mainly sandstones that rest unconformably on an old land surface, with up to 300 m of relief locally. The Torridonian is divided into the older Stoer Group and the younger Sleat and Torridon Groups separated by an angular unconformity. Paleomagnetic data suggest that this unconformity represents a major time break. These sediments are interpreted to have been deposited during a period of rifting.

==== Stoer Group ====
The Stoer Group outcrops on the peninsula of Stoer, near Assynt, Sutherland. A basal breccia is present in many areas with large clasts derived from the underlying Lewisian. The breccia passes up into muddy sandstones, often with well-preserved desiccation structures, and into deposits of a braided river system, trough cross-bedded sandstones and conglomerates. A thin sequence of siltstones and fine sandstones alternate with muddy sandstones, suggesting deposition in a lacustrine environment. The uppermost part of the sequence consists of trough cross-bedded sandstones thought to have been deposited by braided rivers.

==== Sleat Group ====
The Sleat Group, which outcrops on the Sleat peninsula on Skye, underlies the Torridon Group conformably, but the relationship with the Stoer Group is nowhere exposed. It is presumed to have been in deposited later that the Stoer Group, but possibly in a separate sub-basin. It is metamorphosed to greenschist facies and sits within the Kishorn Nappe, part of the Caledonian thrust belt, making its exact relationship to the other outcrops difficult to assess. The sequence consists of mainly coarse-grained feldspathic sandstones deposited in a fluvial environment with some less common grey shales, probably deposited in a lacustrine environment.

==== Torridon Group ====
The Torridon Group infills an irregular land surface with up to 600 m of topography locally, cutting down through the previously deposited Stoer group sediments, resting in many areas directly on the Lewisian. The lowest part of this group consists of a basal breccia passing up into sandstones and subordinate shales deposited as alluvial fans building out into ephemeral lakes. The upper parts of the group consist of an overall fining-upward sequence of sandstones, interpreted to have been deposited in a bajada environment.

=== Cambro-Ordovician sediments ===
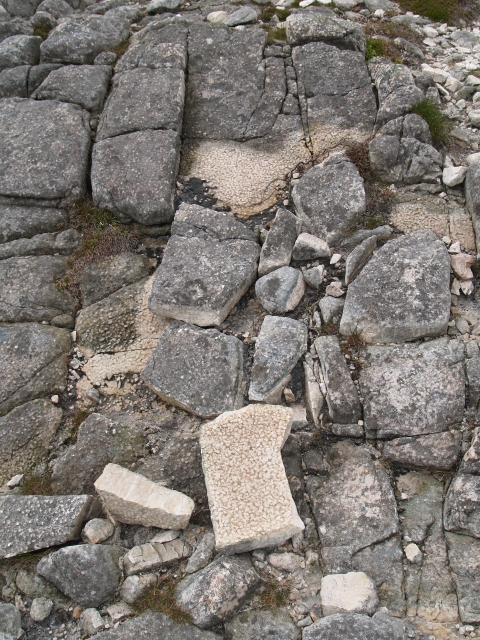
Pipe Rock viewed on a bedding surface

This thin strip of Lower Paleozoic strata lie unconformably on both the Lewisian complex and the Torridonian. The sequence is divided into the lower Cambrian Ardvreck Group overlain by the Durness Group of Cambrian to lower Ordovician age.

==== Ardvreck Group ====
The ca. 200 m thick lower Cambrian Ardvreck Group consists of two formations, the basal Eriboll Formation and the overlying An-t-Sron Formation. The Eriboll Formation contains the Basal Quartzite member, with a basal conglomerate overlain by the heavily bioturbated Pipe Rock member with its distinctive skolithos trace fossils. The An-t-Sron Formation consists of calcareous siltstones of the Fucoid Beds and overlying sandstone of the Salterella Grit.

==== Durness Group ====
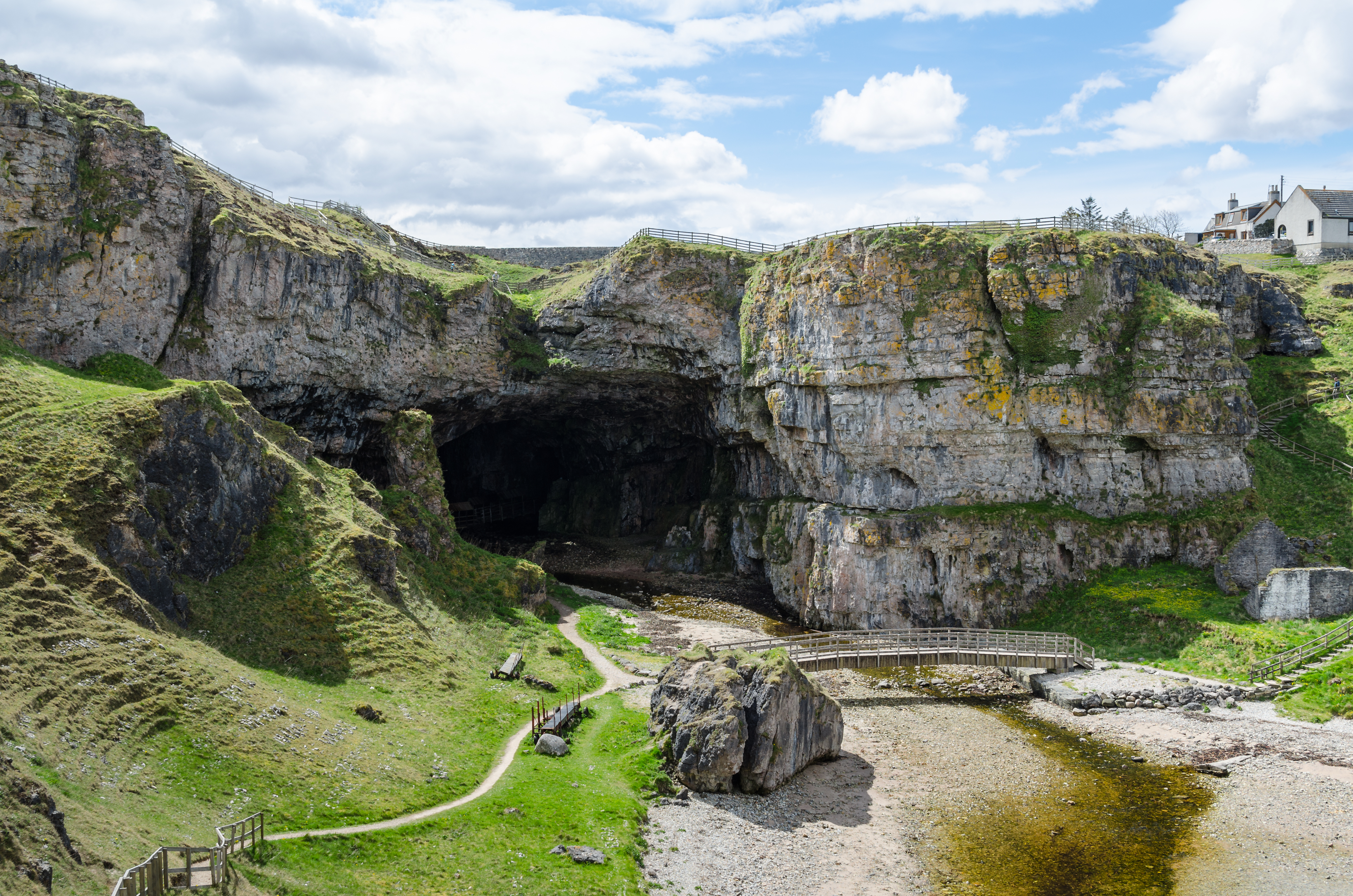
Durness Group dolomite exposed at the entrance to Smoo Cave in Durness

The Durness group lies conformably on the Ardvreck Group. It consists of several hundred metres of mainly dolomites with some limestones and cherts, although the effects of later faulting make precise estimates of thickness difficult. It is subdivided into seven formations.

== History ==
The earliest event recorded in the terrane is the intrusion of the protoliths to the Scourian gneisses at about 3.0–2.7 Ga. Blocks within the Lewisian complex were then juxtaposed by Inverian and Laxfordian deformation from about 2.4–1.7 Ga. At about 1200 Ma, the terrane was affected by extensional tectonics causing rifting and the deposition of the thick coarse clastic sequence of the Torridonian. This was interrupted by a tilting event of unknown origin that caused a hiatus of about 200 Ma, followed by further deposition. At the start of the Cambrian, there was a marine transgression and deposition of shallow marine sandstone and carbonates continuing into the Ordovician. In the Silurian the terrane became involved in the Caledonian continental collision, with the Highland Terrane being thrust over this segment of the Laurentian foreland.
