= Diabaig =

Coordinates: 57.57832°N 5.68319°W

Diabaig: Scottish Gaelic: Dìobaig
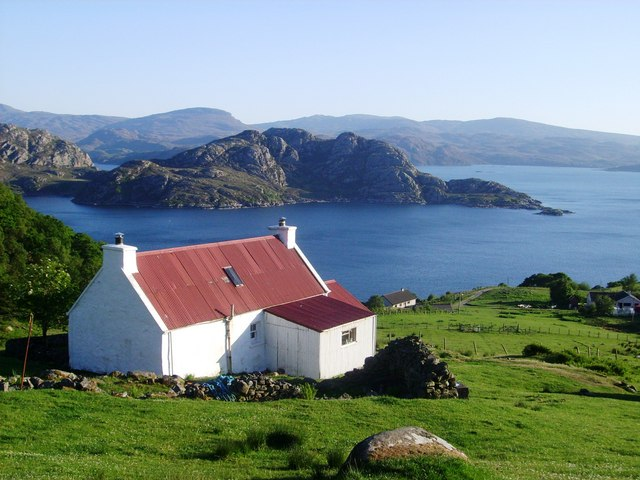
- View from Diabaig, looking across Loch Diabaig

- Location within the Ross and Cromarty area
- Population: 17−30
- OS grid reference: NG798602
- Civil parish: Applecross
- Council area: Highland
- Lieutenancy area: Ross and Cromarty
- Country: Scotland
- Sovereign state: United Kingdom
- Post town: ACHNASHEEN
- Postcode district: IV22
- Dialling code: 01445
- Police: Scotland
- Fire: Scottish
- Ambulance: Scottish
- UK Parliament: Ross, Skye and Lochaber
- Scottish Parliament: Ross, Skye and Inverness West

Diabaig (Scottish Gaelic: Dìobaig) is a remote coastal fishing and crofting township in Wester Ross, in the Northwest Highlands of Scotland. Diabaig lies on the north shore of the sea loch of Loch Diabaig, an inlet off the north side of Loch Torridon, and is in the Highland council area.

The main part of the settlement is known as Lower Diabaig. Upper Diabaig is a few houses, about 1 mile (1.6 km) to the east. The village of Torridon, with its junction with the A896 road, is located 8.6 miles (13.8 km) from Diabaig.

== Geography ==
Diabaig is at the end of a minor road, the C1083, which runs along the north side of Loch Torridon, from the village of Torridon. The villages of Alligin Shuas and Inveralligin lie to the southeast along this road. A footpath continues along the coast from Diabaig, running 11 kilometres (6.8 mi) to the small settlement of Redpoint, near Gairloch.

== Filming ==
Loch Diabaig played the part of Loch Ness in the 1996 film of the same name, in which Ted Danson starred.

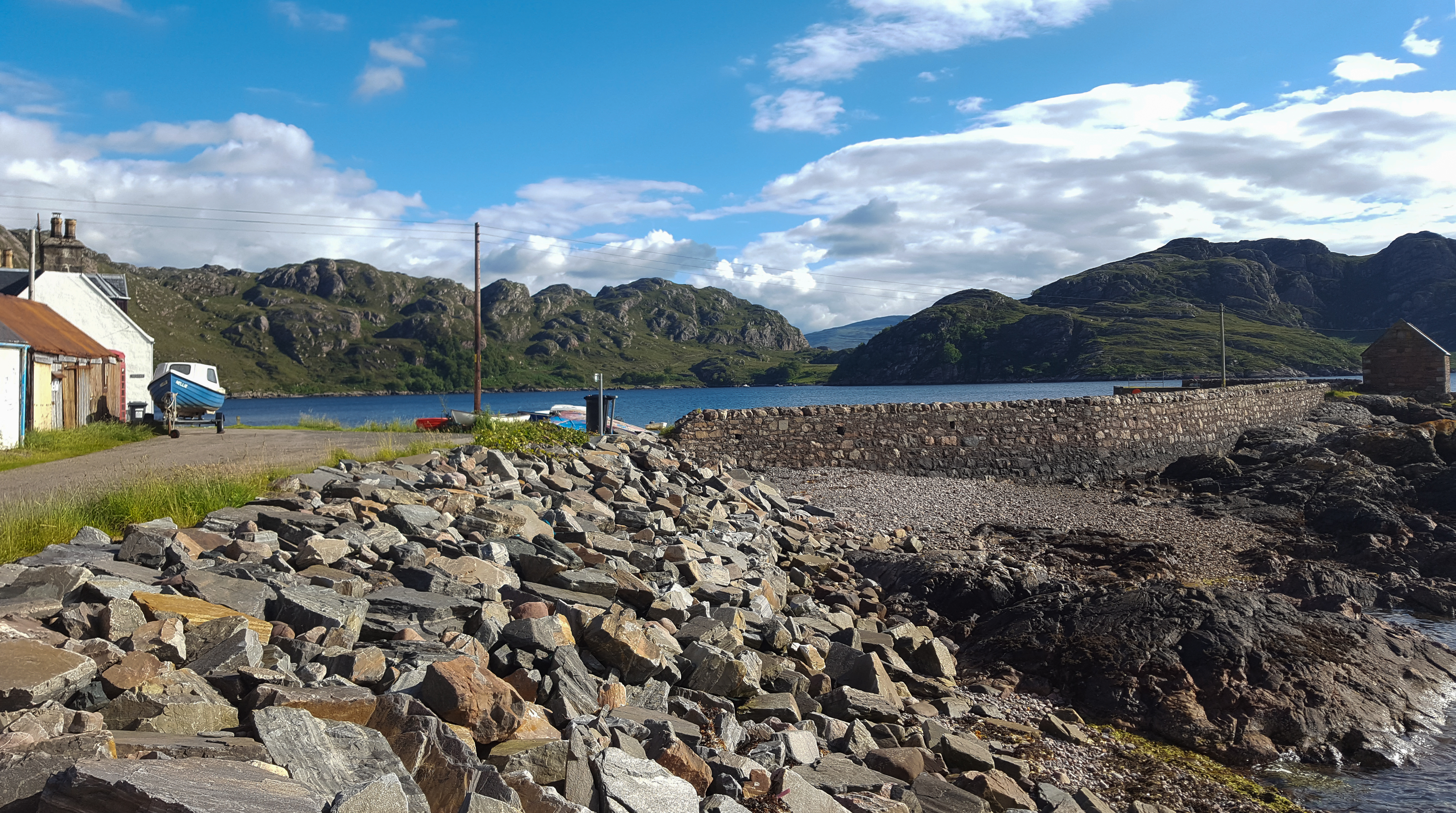
Pier and foreshore at Lower Diabaig
