= Renlandian Orogeny =

Tonian tectonic and metamorphic event in Greenland

The Renlandian Orogeny is a Tonian (early Neoproterozoic) tectonic and metamorphic event that is found in East Greenland, on Svalbard, on Ellesmere Island and in Scotland. It takes its name from Renland in East Greenland, where the event was first recognised.

== Identification ==
This tectonic and metamorphic event was first identified at Renland where the 1040–920 Ma (ages relate to the youngest detrital zircons and timing of later intrusions) Krummedal Succession is folded and cut by an augen gneiss with an interpreted crystallisation age of 915 ± 18 Ma. In northeastern Svalbard latest Mesoproterozoic to early Neoproterozoic siliciclastic rocks are affected by the Nordaustlandet Orogeny, which has been directly correlated with the Renlandian. This medium-grade metamorphism and associated felsic magmatism affects the Krossfjorden Group (west Svalbard) and the Brennvinsfjord Group and Helvetesflya Formation (east Svalbard). In Scotland, the Renlandian event has been recognised in the rocks of the Wester Ross Supergroup of the Scottish Highlands and Shetland but not in the slightly younger Loch Ness Supergroup suggesting that the orogeny was responsible for the stratigraphic gap between these sequences.

== Interpretation ==
The areas affected by this orogeny are interpreted to have been close to a convergent margin on the edge of the supercontinent Rodinia. The tectonic and metamorphic effects could have been the result of flat-slab subduction and/or terrane accretion along this margin. The Renlandian Orogeny and the somewhat younger Knoydartian Orogeny are interpreted to have both been a result of this long-lived convergent margin, together forming the Valhalla Orogeny.
