= Loch Ness Supergroup =

- Stratigraphic range: 900–850 Ma
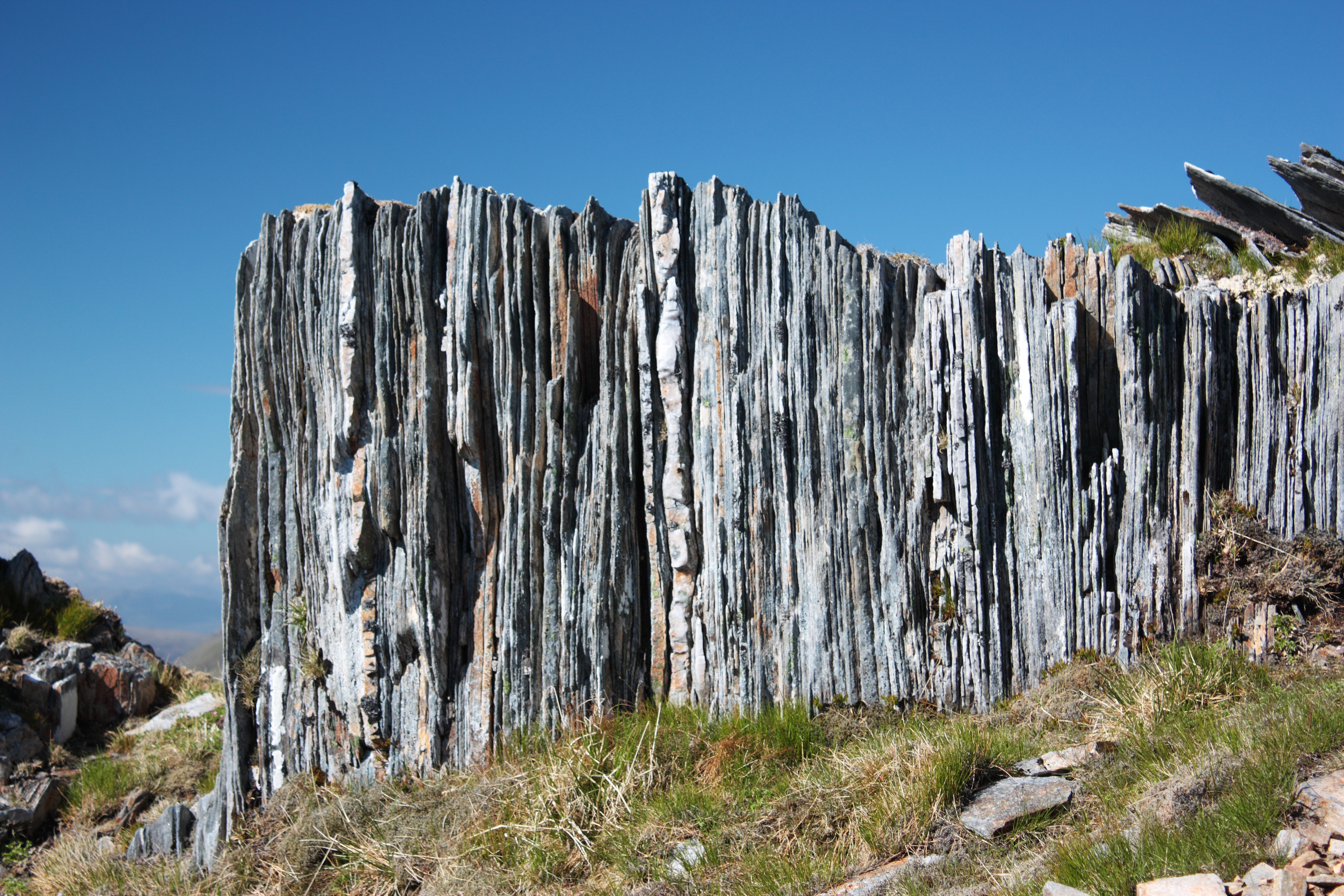
- Vertically banded rocks of the Glenfinnan Group
- Type: Geological supergroup
- Sub-units: Loch Eil Group, Glenfinnan Group, Badenoch Group
- Underlies: Dalradian Supergroup
- Overlies: Wester Ross Supergroup with tectonic contact
- Area: Northwestern Scotland
- Thickness: 6–9 km

Lithology
- Primary: Semi-pelite, Pelite, Psammite
- Other: Quartzite

Type section
- Named for: Loch Ness

The Loch Ness Supergroup is one of the subdivisions of the Neoproterozoic sequence of sedimentary rocks (or their metamorphic equivalents) in the Scottish Highlands. It is found everywhere in tectonic contact above the older Wester Ross Supergroup. It is thought to be unconformably overlain by the Cryogenian to Cambrian Dalradian Supergroup.

== Stratigraphy ==
The supergroup is subdivided into three groups.

=== Glenfinnan Group ===
This group, which consists of amphibolite facies pelitic gneiss and interbanded pelite, semi-pelite, psammite, quartzite and migmatites, lies tectonically above the Sgùrr Beag Thrust and below the Loch Eil Group. There is evidence of a true stratigraphic transition between these two groups in some areas. Slices of Lewisian-type gneisses are found above the Sgùrr Beag Thrust and are interpreted to represent pieces of basement to the group, with a highly sheared unconformable contact, incorporated during the Caledonian orogeny. The original stratigraphic thickness of the group is difficult to estimate due to the high level of strain that it experienced but is likely to be several kilometres. The sequence lacks any sedimentary structures due to its strain state.

=== Loch Eil Group ===
This group , which consists dominantly of psammite with local developments of quartzite, lies above the Glenfinnan Group in what is interpreted to be a normal stratigraphic contact. The upper boundary of this group is not seen, with Old Red Sandstone typically found unconformably above it. In contrast to the Glennfinnnan Group, there are well-preserved sedimentary structures. Towards the southwestern end of its outcrop the Group consists of widespread psammites within which are identified a lower Kinlocheil Quartzite Formation which is anything up to 1.5 km in thickness, an overlying Glen Gour Quartzite and Pelite Formation of 500-800m thickness and above this, the 100-650m thick Stronchreggan Formation. A Tarvie Psammite Formation is recorded in the Strathconon and Strathglass districts. The total thickness of the group is thought to lie in the range 2.5–5.0 km.

=== Badenoch Group ===
The succession is divided into two subgroups, although the stratigraphic relationship between them remains unclear, the Dava Subgroup (previously referred to as the Dava Succession) and the Glen Banchor Subgroup. The former, named from the locality of Dava between Inverness and Grantown-on-Spey includes the Slochd Psammite and Flichity Semipelite formations. The contact with the Grampian Group is interpreted to be highly sheared unconformity. The latter is named for Glen Banchor, west of Newtonmore, the type area being from here to Laggan. The Glen Banchor sequence is believed to be between 1 and 1.5 km thick and unconformably overlain by rocks of the Grampian and Appin groups, though the boundary may be tectonic in nature. The total thickness of the group is estimated to be several kilometres.

== Age ==
The age of this sequence is constrained by a combination of detrital zircon geochronology, the crystallization ages of igneous intrusions that cut the sequence and metamorphic ages for events that later affected the supergroup. The youngest detrital zircon ages are in the range 1000–900 Ma (million years ago), with one zircon from the Badenoch Group giving an age of 900±17 Ma, postdating the Renlandian Orogeny. Igneous intrusions that cut the Glenfinnan Group give crystallization ages of about 870 Ma and the Badenoch Group was affected by the Knoydartian Orogeny, giving metamorphic ages of about 840 Ma. Taken together these data imply a depositional age range of 900–850 Ma.

== Depositional setting ==
The relatively intense metamorphic and tectonic history of this sequence makes any detailed interpretation of the depositional setting very difficult. The presence of finely interbedded psammite, pelite and quartzite is consistent with a shallow water to shelf setting. The evidence of bimodal magmatism affecting the Loch Eil Group combined with the MORB chemistry of the mafic intrusions is consistent with a period of rifting. Detrital zircon ages show that some of the sediment was coming from a Renlandian source, suggesting that the sequence was deposited in its hinterland, possibly as part of a foreland basin.
