= Stoer Group =

- Stratigraphic range: 1200–1000
- Type: Geological group
- Sub-units: Clachtoll Formation, Bay of Stoer Formation, Meall Dearg Formation
- Underlies: Torridon Group
- Overlies: Lewisian complex
- Thickness: up to 1,500 metres (4,920 ft)

Location
- Region: Scottish Highlands
- Country: Scotland

Type section
- Named for: Stoer

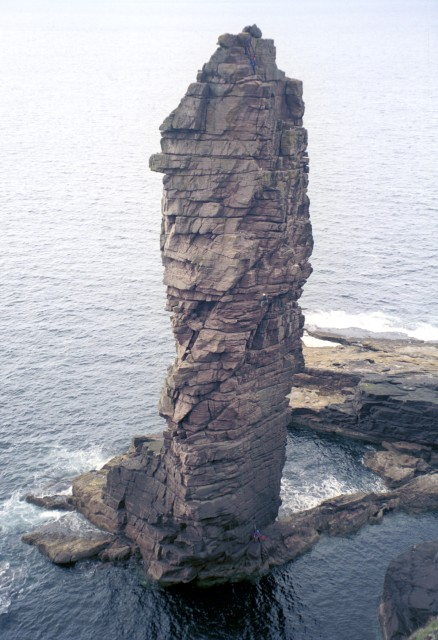
Thick-bedded sandstones of the Stoer Group exposed on the Old Man of Stoer

The Stoer Group is a sequence of Mesoproterozoic sedimentary rocks that outcrops on the peninsula of Stoer, near Assynt, Sutherland. The dominant lithology is sandstone with breccias and conglomerates developed near the base It is subdivided into three formations. It lies unconformably on the underlying Archaean to Paleoproterozoic age gneisses of the Lewisian complex and is in turn unconformably overlain by the Neoproterozoic Torridon Group.

== Stratigraphy ==
The preserved part of the Stoer Group is made up of three subunits, the Clachtoll, Bay of Stoer and Meall Dearg formations.

=== Clachtoll Formation ===
A basal breccia is present in many areas with large clasts derived from the underlying Lewisian. There is local evidence of weathering of the gneiss beneath the unconformity. Away from the unconformity the breccia becomes crudely stratified within an overall fining upwards sequence passing up into pebbly sandstones, the deposits of small alluvial fans. This breccia facies passes vertically and laterally in most places into muddy massive sandstones, true greywackes. The lower part of these sandstones are almost unbedded being replaced upwards by half metre thick beds capped by siltstones often with well-preserved desiccation structures. In parts of the outcrop, the muddy sandstones are succeeded by the deposits of a braided river system, trough cross-bedded sandstones and conglomerates.

=== Bay of Stoer Formation ===
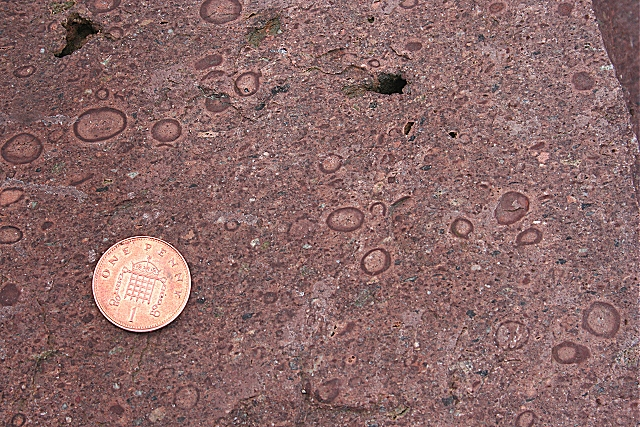
Accretionary lapilli from the Stac Fada Member at Enard Bay, with a British penny for scale (diameter 20.3 mm)

The Bay of Stoer Formation consists of a lower section formed of red trough cross-bedded sandstones with some pebbles, interpreted to be the deposits of a braided river system. The uppermost 100 m of the formation, the Stac Fada and Poll a' Mhuilt members, form a distinctive marker layer within the Stoer Group succession with a strike extent of 50 km. The Stac Fada Member is generally about 10 m thick and consists of muddy sandstone facies with abundant clasts of vesicular volcanic glass, locally with accretionary lapilli. The matrix for these volcanic clasts is always non-volcanic suggesting transport from the area where they were erupted. The member also includes large rafts of gneiss and sandstone, up to 15 m in length. The Stac Fada member has been traditionally interpreted to be a mudflow. An alternative suggestion has been that the member represents part of the proximal ejecta blanket from an impact crater. This interpretation is supported by the presence of shocked quartz and biotite. The overlying Poll a' Mhuilt member consists of a thin sequence of siltstones and fine sandstones alternating with muddy sandstones, suggesting deposition in a lacustrine environment.

=== Meall Dearg Formation ===
The uppermost part of the sequence consists of trough cross-bedded sandstones thought to have been deposited by braided rivers, similar to the lower part of the Bay of Stoer Formation, possibly with wider channels and a lower paleoslope.

== Age ==
A major time break was recognised between the Stoer Group and the overlying Torridon Group from paleomagnetic data. This has been confirmed by radiometric dating, initially Pb-Pb dating of a limestone in the Stoer Group (1199±70 Ma), followed by Ar-Ar dating of the Stac Fada Member ejecta blanket deposit at a slightly lower stratigraphic level (1177±5 Ma). However, later zircon dating of the Stac Fada member suggests a younger age of 990 ± 22 million years, suggesting that age estimates of the Stoer Group may need to be revised.
