= Lewisian complex =

Metamorphic rocks in northwestern Scotland

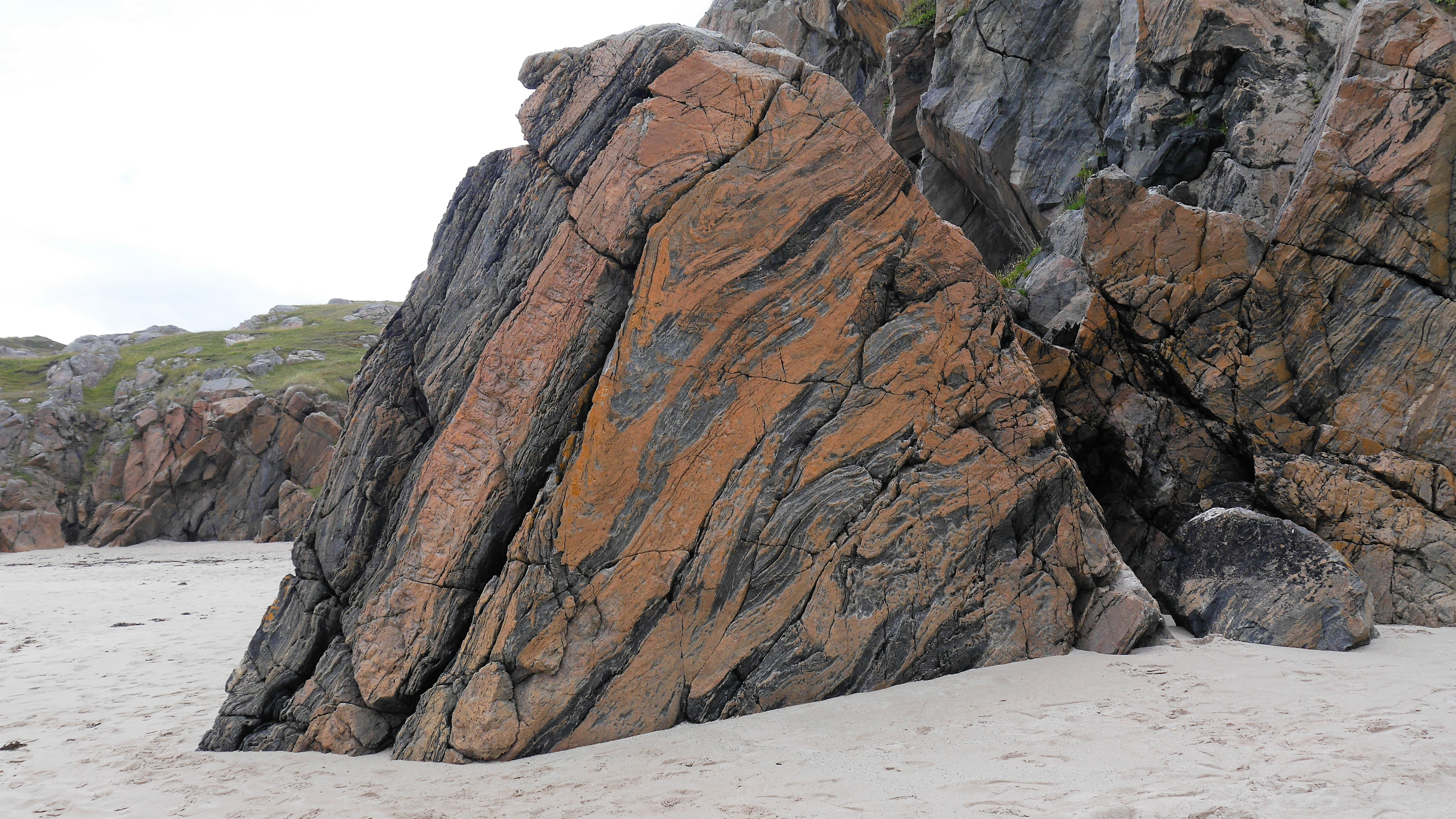
Outcrop of weathered Lewisian gneiss, 5 km NW of Lochinver

The Lewisian complex or Lewisian gneiss is a suite of Precambrian metamorphic rocks that outcrop in the northwestern part of Scotland, forming part of the Hebridean terrane and the North Atlantic Craton. These rocks are of Archaean and Paleoproterozoic age, ranging from 3.0 to 1.7 billion years (Ga). They form the basement on which the Stoer Group, Wester Ross Supergroup and probably the Loch Ness Supergroup sediments were deposited. The Lewisian consists mainly of granitic gneisses with a minor amount of supracrustal rocks. Rocks of the Lewisian complex were caught up in the Caledonian orogeny, appearing in the hanging walls of many of the thrust faults formed during the late stages of this tectonic event.

== Distribution ==
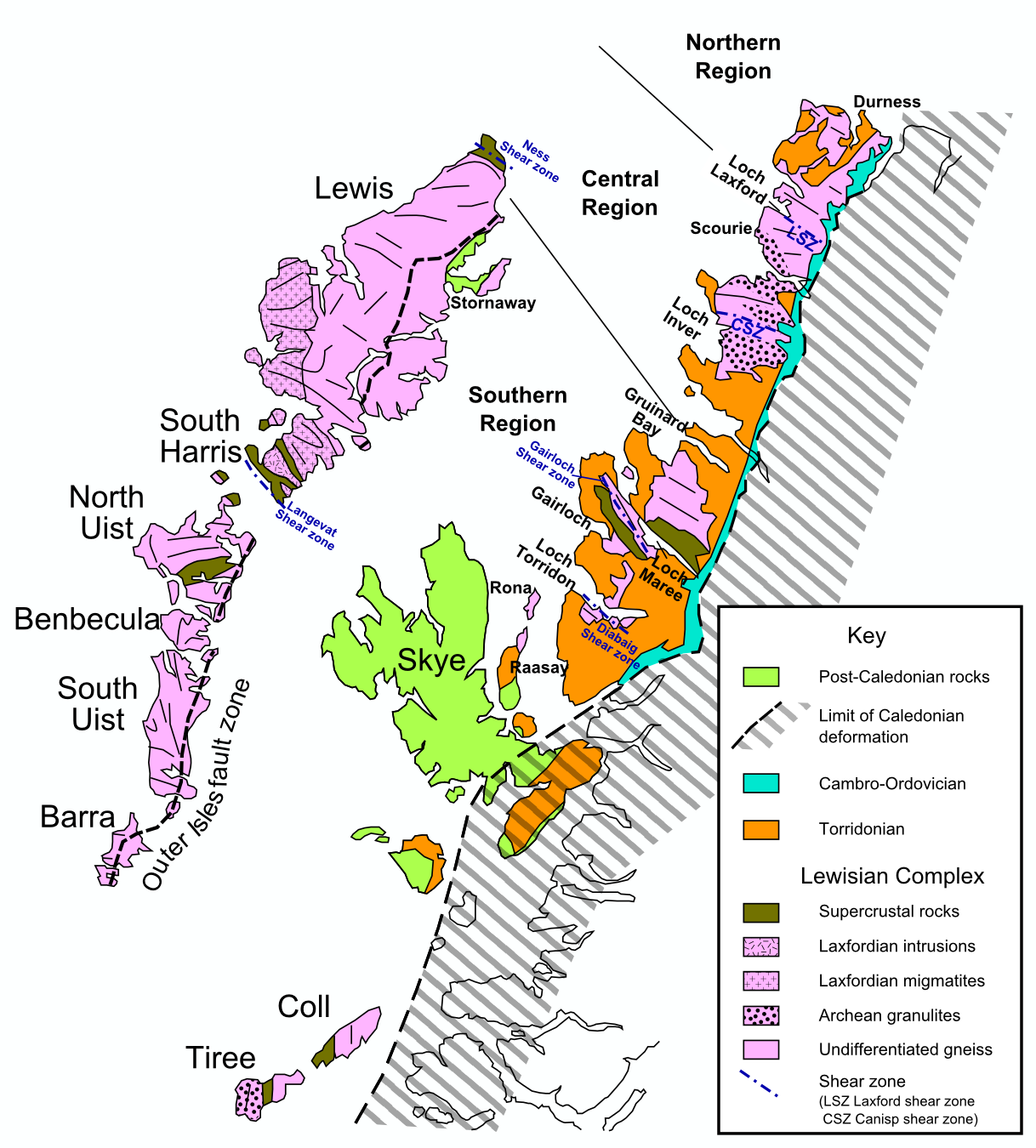
Geological map of the Hebridean terrane showing distribution of rocks of the Lewisian complex

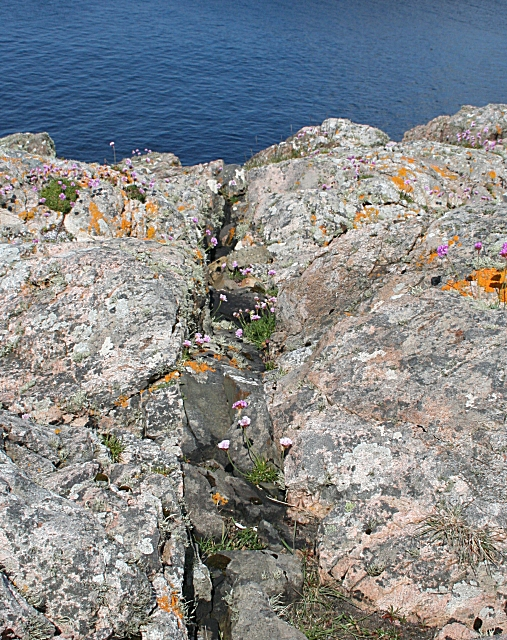
Undeformed Scourie dyke cutting Lewisian Gneiss, about 1.6 km west of Scourie

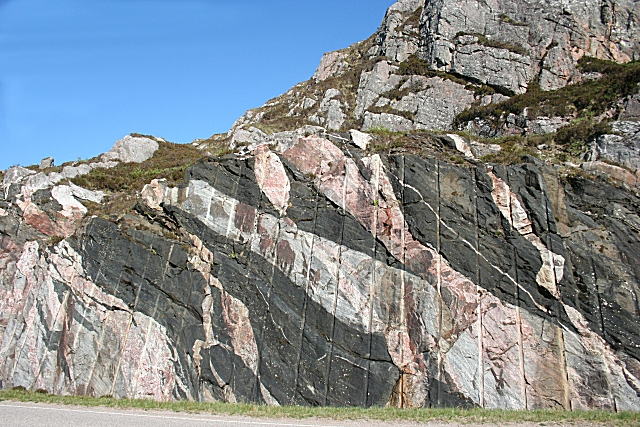
Scourie dykes (now foliated amphibolites) cutting grey gneiss of the Scourie complex, both deformed during the Laxfordian tectonic event and cut by later (unfoliated) granite veins - road cutting on the A838 just north of Laxford Bridge

The main outcrops of the Lewisian complex are on the islands of the Outer Hebrides, including Lewis, from which the complex takes its name. It is also exposed on several islands of the Inner Hebrides, small islands north of the Scottish mainland and forms a coastal strip on the mainland from near Loch Torridon in the south to Cape Wrath in the north. Its presence at seabed and beneath Paleozoic and Mesozoic sediments west of Shetland and in the Minches and Sea of the Hebrides has been confirmed from the magnetic field, by shallow boreholes and hydrocarbon exploration wells. Basement rocks of similar type are found at the base of both the Morar Group and the overlying Loch Ness Supergroup, sometimes with well-preserved unconformable contacts, and these are generally accepted as forming part of the Lewisian, suggesting that the Lewisian complex extends at least as far southeast as the Great Glen Fault. Lewisian-like granitic gneisses of Paleoproterozoic age of the Rhinns complex are exposed on Islay and Colonsay in the southern part of the Inner Hebrides. Similar rocks also outcrop on Inishtrahull off the north coast of County Donegal and in County Mayo where they are known as the 'Annagh Gneiss complex'.

== History of study ==
The first comprehensive account of the Lewisian complex was published in 1907 as part of the Geological Survey memoir The Geological Structure of the North-West Highlands of Scotland. In 1951 John Sutton and Janet Watson built on this work by interpreting the metamorphic and structural development of the Lewisian as a series of discrete orogenic events that could be discerned in the field. They used a swarm of dolerite dykes, known as the Scourie dykes, as markers to separate the tectonic and metamorphic events into a Scourian event that occurred before the intrusion of the dykes and a later Laxfordian event that deformed and metamorphosed members of the same dyke swarm. Subsequent fieldwork, metamorphic studies and radiometric dating has refined their chronology but supported their original hypothesis.

== Lewisian of the Scottish mainland ==
=== Scourie complex ===
The oldest part of the Lewisian complex is a group of gneisses of Archaean age that formed in the interval 3.0–2.7 Ga. These gneisses are found throughout the outcrop of the Lewisian complex in the mainland. The dominant lithology of the Scourie complex is banded grey gneisses, typically granodioritic, tonalitic or trondhjemitic in composition. Metasedimentary gneisses are relatively rare. The protolith for the Scourian gneisses are thought to be granitic, with subsidiary mafic and ultramafic plutonic rocks giving an overall bimodal character. Some variation in the age of the protoliths from different parts of the complex and their subsequent tectonic and metamorphic history suggest that there are two or possibly three distinct crustal blocks within the mainland outcrop.

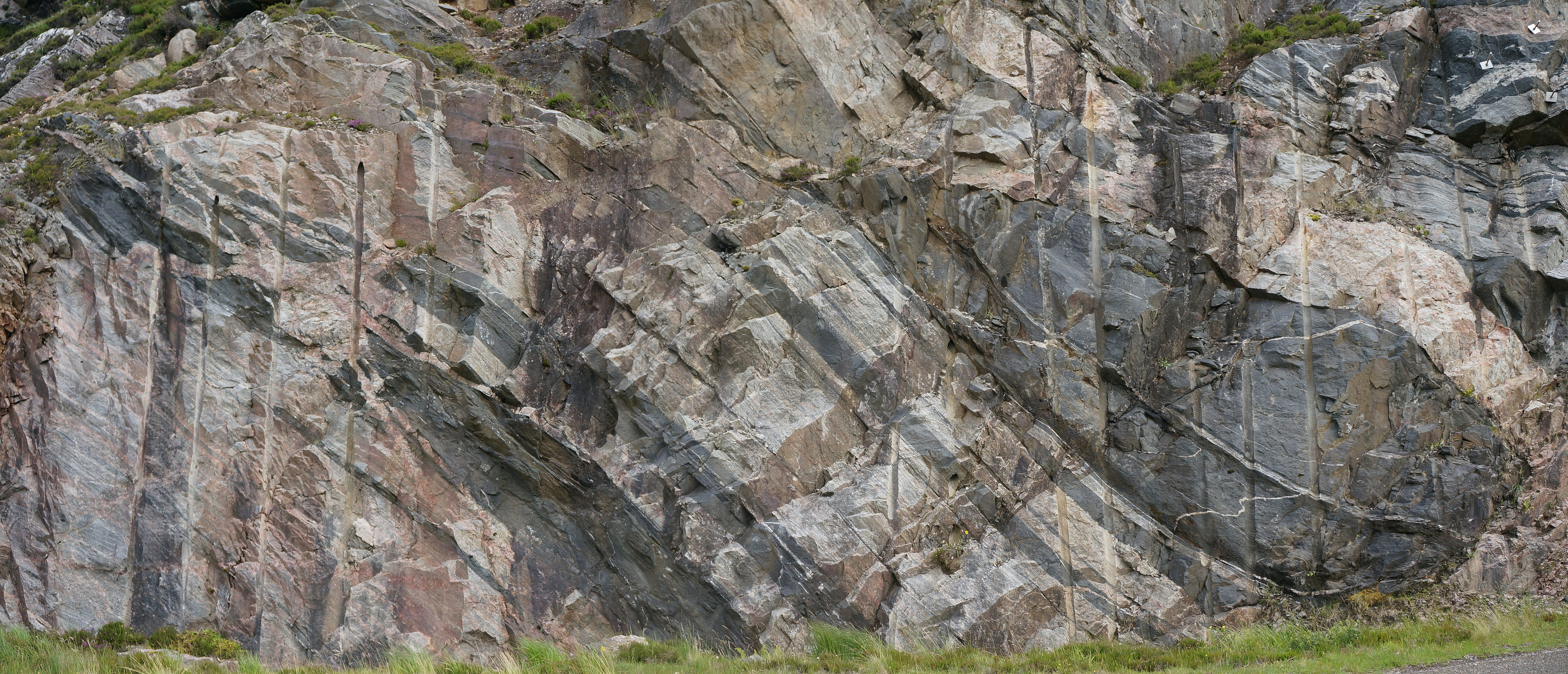
Lewisian Gneiss - Rhiconich, Scotland

The main metamorphic event in the Central Region was the 2.5 Ga granulite facies Badcallian event. The Northern Region lacks evidence of granulite facies and in the Southern Region an earlier 2.73 Ga event is recognised locally.

=== Inverian event ===
This tectonic and metamorphic event postdates the main granulite facies metamorphic event in the Scourian complex but mostly predates intrusion of the Scourie dykes. This event deforms a suite of post-Badcallian pegmatites dated at 2.49-2.48 Ga and predates most of the Scourie dykes, giving a possible age range of approximately 2.48 - 2.42 Ga. The deformation was accompanied by retrograde metamorphism down to amphibolite facies, similar to the later Laxfordian event. Distinguishing between these two events has proved difficult. Major Inverian shear zones have been identified in the Central and Southern Regions, including the Canisp Shear Zone.

=== Scourie dykes ===
This basic dyke swarm cuts the banding of the Scourie complex gneisses and therefore postdates the main igneous, tectonic and metamorphic events that created them. Due to the degree of later metamorphism and deformation in other parts of the mainland outcrop, the only reliable radiometric ages come from the Central Region, giving an age for the main part of the swarm as about 2.4 Ga. Some dykes, which appear to have been intruded into cooler Scourian crust give ages of about 2.0 Ga, the same age as undated sills within the Loch Maree Group. Some of the main dyke suite show evidence of intrusion into hot country rock. Most of the dykes are quartz-dolerites in terms of chemistry, with less common olivine gabbro, norite and bronzite picrite.

=== The Loch Maree Group ===
Supracrustal rocks of the Loch Maree Group form two large areas of outcrop near Loch Maree and Gairloch in the Southern Region. The group consists of metasediments with intercalated amphibolites, interpreted to be metavolcanics with some basic sills. They were probably deposited at about 2.0 Ga, as they contain detrital zircons that give a mixture of Archaean and Paleoproterozoic ages.

=== Laxfordian events ===
The Laxfordian was originally recognised from the presence of deformation and metamorphism of the Scourie dykes. The Laxfordian can be divided into an early event before 1.7 Ga, associated with retrogression of the Scourie gneisses from granulite to amphibolite facies and a later event with local further retrogression to greenschist facies, part of which may be Grenvillian in age (about 1.1Ga). The early event is particularly associated with shear zones in which the deformed Scourie dykes form amphibolite sheets within the reworked gneisses. The original mineralogy of the dykes is also changed to an amphibolite facies assemblage, even where they remain undeformed. The early Laxfordian fabrics are cut by a series of granites and pegmatites, particularly in the Northern and Southern Regions dated at 1.7 Ga.

== Lewisian of the Outer Hebrides ==
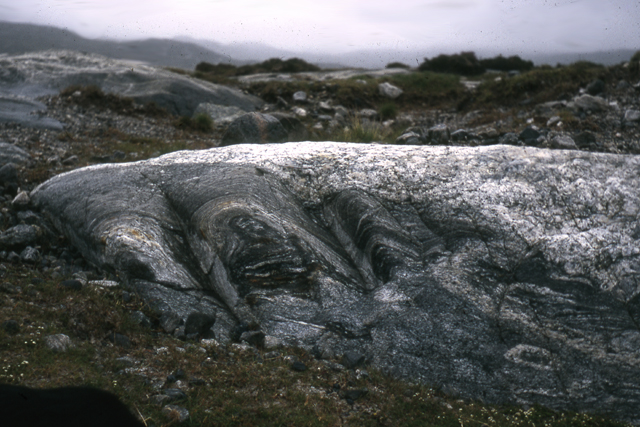
Folded Lewisian gneiss, Harris

Much of the Lewisian outcrop of the Outer Hebrides consist of rocks of the Scourie complex cut by post-Scourian granites. Laxfordian reworking is extensive and very little unmodified Scourian crust has survived. Amphibolite sheets, interpreted to be deformed members of the Scourie Dykes, are much less common than on the mainland. More of the outcrop area consists of supracrustal rocks, about 5% of the total. The relationship between the supreacrustal rocks and the Scourian gneisses remains unclear.

=== South Harris igneous complex ===
The South Harris igneous complex consists mainly of anorthosite and metagabbro, with lesser amounts of tonalitic and pyroxene-granulite gneisses. These igneous rocks are intruded into the Leverburgh and Langevat supracrustals. Radiometric dating suggests that the complex was intruded over a period from about 2.2–1.9 Ga, comparable to the age of the Loch Maree Group. The Ness Anorthosite, exposed on the northeastern tip of Lewis, is also found associated with metasediments and yields a similar Sm-Nd model age of about 2.2 Ga. It is considered possible that the South Harris and Ness bodies once formed part of a continuous body, disrupted by Laxfordian deformation.

=== Langevat and Leverburgh metasediments ===
These two belts of metasediments flank the South Harris igneous complex, and form the largest outcrop of such rocks in the Outer Hebrides. Radiometric dating has shown these metasediments to be of Paleoproterozoic age, similar to the rocks of the Loch Maree Group. The relationship between these metasediments and Scourian gneisses remains unclear.

=== Outer Isles fault zone ===
This fault zone stretches the entire length of the Outer Hebrides, a distance of about 200 km, dipping 20°–30° to the ESE. The fault rock within the fault zone shows a long and complex history of movement with the development of fault breccia, mylonite and pseudotachylite, indicating faulting at a wide range of crustal levels.

== Lewisian inliers within the Morar Group and Loch Ness Supergroup ==
Despite the multiple reworking that has affected Lewisian-like gneisses within the metasediments of these two sequences, they show evidence of a common history, although with some important differences. The largest, the Glenelg-Attadale inlier, shows evidence of eclogite facies metamorphism within both of the tectonically juxtaposed units that make up the inlier, thought to be associated with crustal thickening during a Paleoproterozoic event at about 1.7 Ga and the Grenvillian orogenic event respectively.

== See also ==
- Tonalite–trondhjemite–granodiorite – Intrusive rocks with typical granitic composition
