= Detrital zircon geochronology =

Science of analyzing the age of zircons

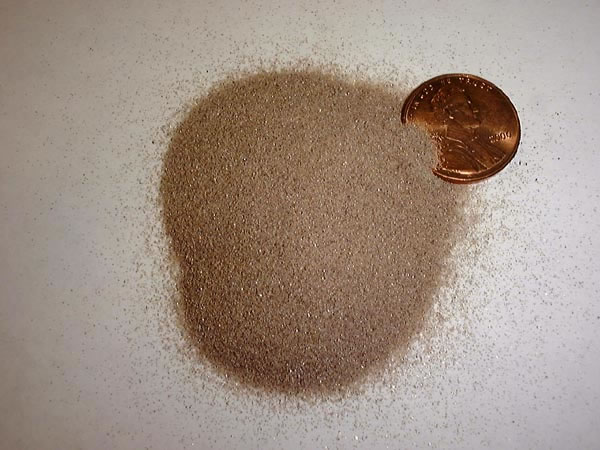
Fig. 1 – Zircon grains (Coin for scale)

Detrital zircon geochronology is a scientific technique for understanding the age and provenance of sedimentary deposits. To determine the age of zircons deposited within a specific sedimentary unit, mass spectrometry is used to measure the abundance of radioisotopes in the grains, most commonly the uranium–lead ratio. Zircon is a common accessory or trace mineral constituent of most granite and felsic igneous rocks. Due to its hardness, durability and chemical inertness, zircon persists in sedimentary deposits and is a common constituent of most sands. Zircons contain trace amounts of uranium and thorium and can be dated using several modern analytical techniques.

Detrital zircon geochronology has become increasingly popular in geological studies from the 2000s mainly due to the advancement in radiometric dating techniques. Detrital zircon age data can be used to constrain the maximum depositional age, determine provenance, and reconstruct the tectonic setting on a regional scale.

== Detrital zircon ==
=== Origin ===
Detrital zircons are part of the sediment derived from weathering and erosion of pre-existing rocks. Since zircons are heavy and highly resistant at Earth's surface, many zircons are transported, deposited and preserved as detrital zircon grains in sedimentary rocks.

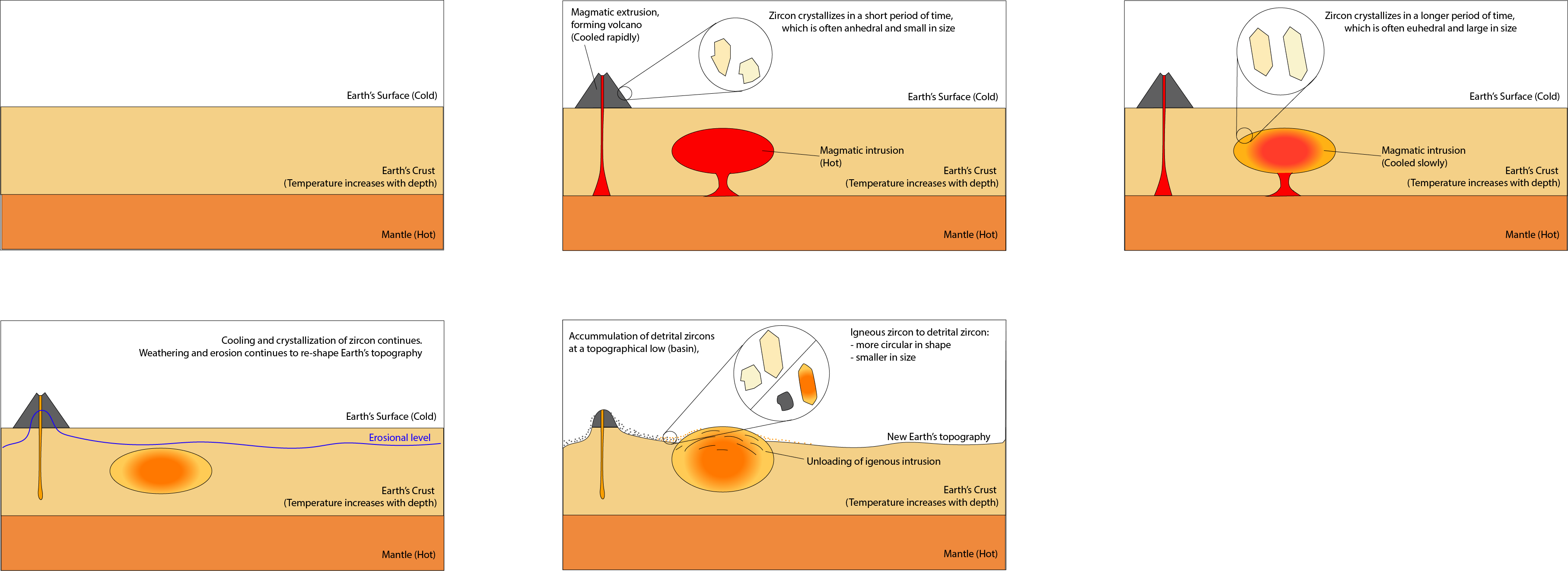
Fig. 2 – Simple diagram illustrating the formation of igneous zircon, the processes of them becoming detrital zircons and the differences between igneous and detrital zircons

=== Properties ===
Detrital zircons usually retain similar properties as their parent igneous rocks, such as age, rough size and mineral chemistry. However, the composition of detrital zircons is not entirely controlled by the crystallization of the zircon mineral. In fact, many of them are modified by later processes in the sedimentary cycle. Depending on the degree of physical sorting, mechanical abrasion and dissolution, a detrital zircon grain may lose some of its inherent features and gain some over-printed properties like rounded shape and smaller size. On a larger scale, two or more tribes of detrital zircons from different origins may deposit within the same sedimentary basin. This gives rise to a natural complexity of associating detrital zircon populations and their sources.

Zircon is a strong tool for uranium-lead age determination because of its inherent properties:

1. Zircon contains high amount of uranium for machine recognition, commonly 100–1000 ppm.
2. Zircon has a low amount of lead during crystallization, in parts per trillion. Thus, lead found in zircon can be assumed as daughter nuclei from parent uranium.
3. Zircon crystals grow between 600 and 1100 °C, while lead is retained within the crystal structure below 800 °C (see Closure temperature). So once zircon has cooled below 800 °C it retains all the lead from the radioactive decay. Therefore, U-Pb age can be treated as the age of crystallization, if the mineral/sample itself has not undergone high temperature metamorphism after formation.
4. Zircon commonly crystallizes in felsic igneous rocks, with greater than 60% silica (SiO_{2}) content. These rocks are generally less dense and more buoyant. They sit high in the Earth's (continental crust), and have good preservation potential.
5. Zircon is physically and chemically resistant, so it is more likely to be preserved in the sedimentary cycle.
6. Zircon contains other elements which gives supplementary information, such as hafnium (Hf), uranium/thorium (U/Th) ratio.

== Sample collection ==
There are no set rules for sample selection in detrital zircon geochronology studies. The objective and scale of the research project govern the type and number of samples taken. In some cases, the sedimentary rock type and depositional setting can significantly affect the result. Examples include:

- Matured quartz arenite within Vlamy Formation yield older and more diverse ages given by well-rounded detrital zircons, which may correlate to multiple sedimentary reworking events. On the contrary, Harmony Formation in the same region has younger and homogenous ages given by euhedral detrital zircons. These two formations illustrate the possibility of relating sedimentary maturity with resulting zircon ages, meaning that rounded and well-sorted sedimentary rocks (e.g. siltstone and mudstone) may have older and more diverse ages.
- Turbidites in Harts Pass Formation contain homogenous detrital zircons ages. On the other hand, fluvial Winthrop Formation in another strata of the same basin has various detrital zircon age populations. Comparing the vertical detrital zircon distribution within these two formations, one can expect a narrower age population of detrital zircons from rocks which are rapidly deposited, such as turbidites. Rocks that are gradually deposited (e.g. marine mudstone), however, have a greater chance and time to incorporate zircon sediments from different localities.

== Detrital zircon extraction ==
After rock samples are collected, they are cleaned, chipped, crushed and milled through standardized procedures. Then, detrital zircons are separated from the fine rock powder by three different ways, namely gravity separation using water, magnetic separation, and gravity separation using heavy liquid. In the process, grains are also sieved according to their size. The commonly used grain size for detrital zircon provenance analysis is 63–125 μm, which is equivalent to fine sand grain size.

== Type of detrital zircon analysis ==
There are two main types of detrital zircon analysis: qualitative analysis and quantitative analysis. The biggest advantage of qualitative analysis is being able to uncover all possible origin of the sedimentary unit, whereas quantitative analysis should allow meaningful comparison of proportions in the sample.

=== Qualitative analysis ===
Qualitative approach examines all the available detrital zircons individually regardless of their abundance among all grains. This approach is usually conducted with high precision thermal ionization mass spectrometry (TIMS) and sometimes secondary ion mass spectrometry (SIMS). Optical examination and classification of detrital zircon grains are commonly included in qualitative studies through back-scatter electrons (BSE) or cathodoluminescence (CL) imagery, despite the relationship between the age and optical classification of detrital zircon grains is not always reliable.

=== Quantitative analysis ===
Quantitative approach requires large number of grain analyses within a sample rock in order to represent the overall detrital zircon population statistically (i.e. the total number of analyses should achieve an appropriate level of confidence). Because of the large sample size, secondary ion mass spectrometry (SIMS) and laser ablation-inductively coupled plasma mass spectrometry (LA-ICPMS) are used instead of thermal ionization mass spectrometry (TIMS). In this case, BSE and CL imagery are applied to select the best spot on a zircon grain for acquiring reliable age.

== Methods ==
Different methods in detrital zircon analysis yield different results. Generally, researchers would include the methods/ analytical instruments they used within their studies. There are generally three categories, which are the instrument(s) used for zircon analysis, their calibration standards and instrument(s) used for zircon imagery. Details are listed in Table 1.

Table 1. Different types of analytical methods in detrital zircon study
Type of instrument for zircon analysis	In modern research, common instruments for U-Pb analysis are sensitive high-resolution ion microprobe (SHRIMP), inductively coupled plasma mass spectrometry (LA-ICPMS) and thermal ionization mass spectrometry (TIMS). Ion microprobe (non-SHRIMP) and lead-lead evaporation techniques were more commonly used in older research.
Zircon calibration standards	Basically analytical machines need to be calibrated before use. Scientists use age-similar (comparable to the sampled zircons) and accurate zircons as their machine calibration standards. Different calibration standards may give slight deviation of the resulting ages. For example, there are at least twelve different standards catering for different sample zircons in Arizona Laserchron Center, primarily using Sri Lanka zircon, followed by Oracle.
Type of instrument for zircon imagery	Instruments / Usage; For macroscopic view (Gives the general appearance of the zircon, cannot identify internal zircon texture properly, especially when the zircon is neither zoned nor metamictized): Binocular microscope (BM) / Can examine zircon grain as a whole: color, transparency, crystal morphology and form growth, inclusions, fractures and alterations.; Transmitted light microscopy (TLM) / Can examine zircon growth zoning and metamictization in cross-polarized light. Challenging for small zircon grains due to limited resolution. Difficult to identify zircon from other high-relief and high-birefringence minerals (such as monazite).; Reflected light microscopy (RLM) / Can examine zircon growth zoning, alteration and metamictization.; For zircon internal structure: Uranium Mapping (UM) / Induce fission tracks within the zircon by neutron flux reactor and record the tracks into an image. Has implications on the amount and distribution of radioactive elements (i.e. uranium) within the zircon grain.; Cathodoluminescence (CL) / One of the best resolution instruments. Induced CL by bombarding zircon with electrons, where U^{4+} ions and radiation damages suppress CL and give darker bands. Different colored CL emission may imply the presence of different element, such as blue (Y^{3+}) and yellow (Ti^{4+} or U^{4+}); Back-scattered electron microscopy (BSM) / Also one of the best resolution instruments currently. Almost like a reversed CL imagery, as the brightness correlates to atomic number. The brightness/ color intensity in BSM is primarily due to hafnium (Hf), with uranium (U) being second.; Secondary electron microscopy (SEM) / See scanning electron microscope.; Fig. 3 – Schematic images of 3 zircons under different imaging instruments. Modified from Corfu et al. (2003), Nemchin and Pidgeon (1997) and J.M. Hanchar

== Detrital zircon data ==
Depending on the detrital zircon study, there should be different variables included for analysis. There are two main types of data, analyzed zircon data (quantifiable data and imagery/descriptive data), and sample (where they extract the zircon grains) data. Details are listed in Table 2.

Table 2. Different types of data in detrital zircon study
Data	Explanation
Analyzed zircon data
Quantifiable data
Grain Number	Grain number is necessary for multiple detrital zircon grains yielded within the same sample rock
U content	Uranium content, usually in ppm.
Th content	Thorium content, usually in ppm.
Th/U ratio	Thorium content divided by uranium content. Most of the detrital zircon grain origins can be identified through Th/U ratio, where Th/U < 0.01 implies possible metamorphic origin and Th/U > 0.5 implies igneous origin. Intermediate origin lies between 0.01 and 0.5.
^{206}Pb/^{238}U	Isotope ratios measured by instrument for further age calculation.
^{207}Pb/^{206}Pb	Isotope ratios measured by instrument for further age calculation.
^{207}Pb/^{235}U	Obtained by calculation since ^{238}U/^{235}U is constant (137.82), i.e. $^{207}Pb/^{235}U=(^{206}Pb/^{238}U)\div(^{206}Pb/^{207}Pb)\times137.82$
^{206}Pb/^{204}Pb	Measured to correct the amount of lead incorporated into the zircon during initial crystallization.
The three resulting ages and their uncertainties	Ages (Ma) are calculated with the associated decay constants, (see Uranium–lead dating): ${{^\text{206}\,\!\text{Pb}^*}\over{^\text{238}\,\!\text{U}}}=e^{\lambda_{238}t}-1,$ / 1; ${{^\text{207}\,\!\text{Pb}^*}\over{^\text{235}\,\!\text{U}}}=e^{\lambda_{235}t}-1.$ / 2; ${^{207}Pb* \over ^{206}Pb*}={(e^{\lambda_{235}t}-1)\over137.82\times(e^{\lambda_{238}t}-1)}$ *Refers to radiogenic isotopes, Where t is the required age, λ_{238} = 1.55125 × 10^{−10} and λ_{235} = 9.8485 × 10^{−10} Uncertainties are expressed as 1σ or 2σ ± value in age (Ma).
%Concordance or %Discordance	Obtained by either comparing with the standard U-Pb Concordia or calculation: $\%Concordance = (^{206}Pb/^{238}U Age)\div(^{207}Pb/^{206}Pb Age)\times100\%$ $\%Concordance = (^{206}Pb/^{238}U Age)\div(^{207}Pb/^{235}U Age)\times100\%$ $\%Discordance=1-\%Concordance$
Descriptive data (more common in qualitative analysis)
Spot Number and nature	Fig. 4 – Laser ablation pit (Spot analysis in LA-ICPMS) on a zircon grain Spot refers to the place on a zircon grain, which is chosen manually for analysis with back-scatter electrons (BSE) or cathodoluminescence (CL) imagery. Generally, researchers analyze detrital zircon core for its oldest crystallization age because zircon grows outwards in rims. There may be rim analysis, which can correlate the late stage of zircon crystallization or metamorphism (if any).
Zircon morphology	Fig. 5 – Diagram illustrating two major forms of zircon and their sets with miller indices, with reference to Corfu et al. (2003) and Wang and Zhou (2001) Zircon morphology refers to the shape of zircon, which is most commonly tetragonal shaped, elongated prismatic crystals with a length-to-width ratio within 1–5. Different zircon shape corresponds to different crystallization medium (chemistry and temperature). A general crystal shape classification would be: Prismatic form: comparing the growth of {100} and {110} set planes; Pyramidal form: comparing the growth of {211} and {101} set planes; Different elongation (defined by length-to-width ratio) corresponds to the zircon crystallization rate. The higher the ratio, the higher the crystallization speed. In detrital zircons, however, zircon morphology may not be well-preserved because of the damage caused on zircon grains during weathering, erosion and transportation. It is common to have sub-rounded/rounded detrital zircons as opposed to prismatic igneous zircon.
Zircon texture	Zircon texture generally refers to the outlook of zircon, specifically its oscillatory zoning pattern under BSE or CL imagery. Zircon with good zoning would have alternating dark and light rim growth. Dark rim is associated with zircon-rich but trace-element poor geochemistry and vice versa. The dark color can be results from the radioactive damage of uranium to the crystal structure. (see metamictization) Zircon growth zoning correlates magmatic melt condition, such as the crystal-melt interface, the melt's degree of saturation, the melt's ion diffusion rate and oxidation state. These can be evidence for provenance studies, by correlating the zircon's melt condition with similar igneous province.
Sample data
Location	Longitude and latitude coordinates are often included in sample description so that spatial analysis can be conducted.
Host rock lithology	Rock/ sediment type of the sample taken. They can be either lithified rocks (e.g. sandstone, siltstone and mudstone) or unconsolidated sediments (e.g. river sediments and placer deposits)
Stratigraphic unit	For most of the surface geology has been explored, the sample collected may be within previously found formations or stratigraphic unit. Identifying the stratigraphic unit can correlate the sample with pre-existed literatures, which often give insights about the sample's origin.
Host rock age	The age of sampled rock unit given by particular age determination method(s), which is not necessarily the youngest detrital zircon age/age population
Age determination method	Different age determination methods yield different host rock ages. Common methods include Biostratigraphy (fossil age within the host rock), dating igneous rocks cross-cutting the host rock strata, superposition in continuous stratigraphy, Magnetostratigraphy (finding the inherent magnetic polarities within the rock strata and correlate them with the global magnetic polarity time scale) and Chemostratigraphy (chemical variations within the host rock sample). (See Geochronology)
Other information
Sources	Original bibliography/citation of papers, if data is retrieved from other researchers.
Past geological events	Large-scale geological events within the zircon crystallization-depositional ages, such as supercontinent cycle, may be useful for data interpretation.
Paleo-climatic condition	The past climatic conditions (humidity and temperature) correlating the degree of rock weathering and erosion may be useful for data interpretation.

== Filtering detrital zircon data ==
All data acquired first-hand should be cleansed before using to avoid error, normally by computer.

=== By U-Pb age discordance ===
Before applying detrital zircon ages, they should be evaluated and screened accordingly. In most cases, data are compared with U-Pb Concordia graphically. For a large dataset, however, data with high U-Pb age discordance (>10 – 30%) are filtered out numerically. The acceptable discordance level is often adjusted with the age of the detrital zircon since older population should experience higher chances of alteration and project higher discordance. (See Uranium–lead dating)

=== By choosing the best age ===
Because of the intrinsic uncertainties within the three yield U-Pb ages (^{207}Pb/^{235}U, ^{206}Pb/^{238}U and ^{207}Pb/^{206}Pb), the age at ~1.4 Ga has the poorest resolution. An overall consensus for age with higher accuracy is to adopt:

- ^{207}Pb/^{206}Pb for ages older than 0.8 – 1.0 Ga
- ^{206}Pb/^{238}U for ages younger than 0.8 – 1.0 Ga

=== By data clustering ===
Given the possibility of concordant yet incorrect detrital zircon U-Pb ages associated with lead loss or inclusion of older components, some scientists apply data selection through clustering and comparing the ages. Three or more data overlapping within ±2σ uncertainty would be classified as a valid age population of a particular source origin.

=== By age uncertainty (±σ) ===
There are no set limit for age uncertainty and the cut-off value varies with different precision requirement. Although excluding data with huge age uncertainty would enhance the overall zircon grain age accuracy, over elimination may lower overall research reliability (decrease in size of the database). The best practice would be to filter accordingly, i.e. setting the cut-off error to eliminate reasonable portion of the dataset (say <5% of the total ages available)

=== By applied analytical methods ===
Depending on the required analytical accuracy, researchers may filter data via their analytical instruments. Generally, researchers use only the data from sensitive high-resolution ion microprobe (SHRIMP), inductively coupled plasma mass spectrometry (LA-ICPMS) and thermal ionization mass spectrometry (TIMS) because of their high precision (1–2%, 1–2% and 0.1% respectively) in spot analysis. An older analytical technique, lead-lead evaporation, is no longer used since it cannot determine the U-Pb concordance of the age data.

=== By spot nature ===
Apart from analytical methods, researchers would isolate core or rim ages for analysis. Normally, core ages would be used as crystallization age as they are first generated and least disturbed part in zircon grains. On the other hand, rim ages can be used to track peak metamorphism as they are first in contact with certain temperature and pressure condition. Researchers may utilize these different spot natures to reconstruct the geological history of a basin.

== Application of detrital zircon ages ==
=== Maximum depositional age ===
Some of the most important information we can get from detrital zircon ages is the maximum depositional age of the referring sedimentary unit. The sedimentary unit cannot be older than the youngest age of the analyzed detrital zircons because the zircon should have existed before the rock formation. This provides useful age information to rock strata where fossils are unavailable, such as the terrestrial successions during Precambrian or pre-Devonian times. Practically, maximum depositional age is averaged from a cluster of youngest age data or the peak in age probability because the youngest U-Pb age within a sample is almost always younger with uncertainty.

=== Tectonic studies ===
==== Using detrital zircon age abundance ====
In a global scale, detrital zircon age abundance can be used as a tool to infer significant tectonic events in the past. In Earth's history, the abundance of magmatic age peaks during periods of supercontinent assembly. This is because supercontinent provides a major crustal envelop selectively preserve the felsic magmatic rocks, resulting from partial melts. Thus, many detrital zircons originate from these igneous provence, resulting similar age peak records. For instance, the peak at about 0.6–0.7 Ga and 2.7 Ga (Figure 6) may correlate the break-up of Rodinia and supercontinent Kenorland respectively.

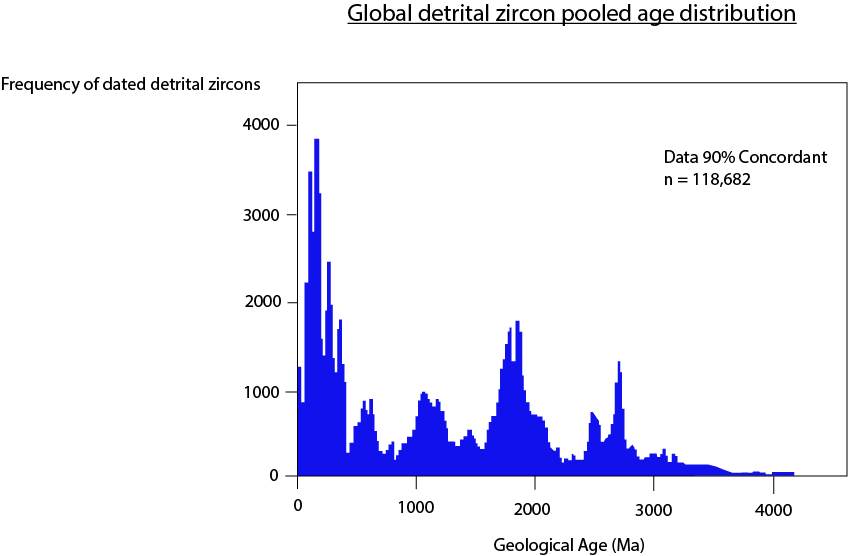
Fig. 6 – Global detrital zircon age distribution in a frequency versus geological age diagram. Modified from Voice et al. (2011)

==== Using difference between detrital zircons crystallisation ages and their corresponding maximum depositional age ====
Apart from the detrital zircon age abundance, difference between detrital zircons crystallisation ages (CA) and their corresponding maximum depositional age (DA) can be plotted in cumulative distribution function to correlate particular tectonic regime in the past. The effect of different tectonic settings on the difference between CA and DA is illustrated in Figure 7 and summarized in Table. 3.

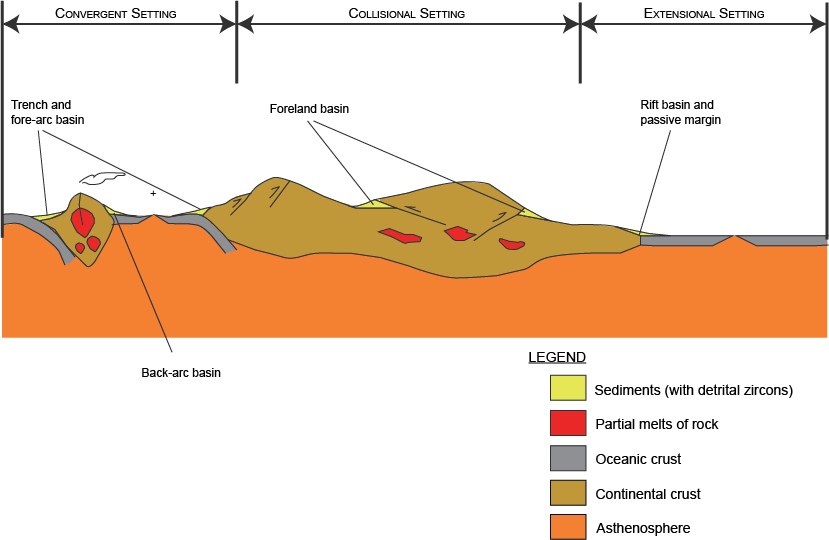
Fig. 7 – Schematic diagram showing the source rock nature and their proximity to the sedimentary basins in multiple tectonic settings. Modified from Cawood et al. (2012)

Table 3. Variable detrital zircon record in different tectonic setting.
	Convergent Setting	Collisional Setting	Extensional Setting
Referred tectonic zone	Ocean-continent collision	Continent-continent collision	Spreading oceanic ridges
Magmatic activities	Syn-sedimentary magmatic activities is likely with continuous subduction induced partial melts	Magma generation is enveloped within a thick lithosphere.	Tectonically stable. Lack of syn-sedimentary magmatic generation
Associated basin	Arc-flanking basin	Foreland basin	Rift basin, passive margin
Main detrital zircon sources	Fed by juvenile generations of volcanic/magmatic rocks	Fed by syn-collisional magmatism and old units caught in the orogen	Fed by a large range of pre-existing old terraines
Resulting zircon record	Youngest detrital zircon grain is approximately the onset of sediment accumulation	High, especially within periods of supercontinent	Youngest detrital zircon provide a maximum depositional age much older than the onset of sediment accumulation
Crystallization age – depositional age	Small	Medium, 10 – 50% within 150Ma	Large, < 5% within 150 Ma
Graphical representation	Fig. 8 – Graph illustrating the generalized zone for cumulative proportional curves of CA-DA in convergent basins. Modified from Cawood et al. (2012)	Fig. 9 – Graph illustrating the generalized zone for cumulative proportional curves of CA-DA in collisional basins. Modified from Cawood et al. (2012).	Fig. 10 – Graph illustrating the generalized zone for cumulative proportional curves of CA-DA in extensional basins. Modified from Cawood et al. (2012)
Graphical representation	The colored zones within Figure 8-10 are simply bounded by constructed cumulative proportion curves of their corresponding setting from all around the world.		
