= Kinlochewe =

Coordinates: 57.6045°N 5.3033°W

Kinlochewe: Scottish Gaelic: Ceann Loch Iù
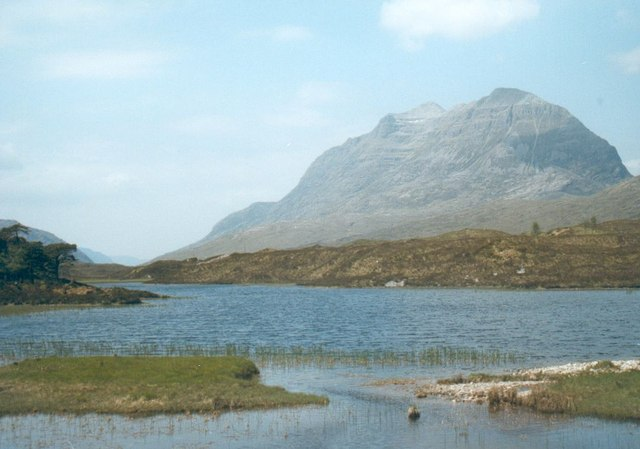
- A corner of Loch Clair, south of Kinlochewe. View across Loch Clair towards the huge bulk of Liathach.

- Location within the Ross and Cromarty area
- Population: 60
- OS grid reference: NH027619
- Civil parish: Gairloch
- Council area: Highland
- Lieutenancy area: Ross and Cromarty
- Country: Scotland
- Sovereign state: United Kingdom
- Post town: ACHNASHEEN
- Postcode district: IV22
- Dialling code: 01445
- Police: Scotland
- Fire: Scottish
- Ambulance: Scottish
- UK Parliament: Inverness, Skye and West Ross-shire
- Scottish Parliament: Ross, Skye and Inverness West

Kinlochewe (Scottish Gaelic: Ceann Loch Iù or Iùbh) is a village in Wester Ross in the Northwest Highlands of Scotland. It is in the parish of Gairloch, the community of Torridon and Kinlochewe and the Highland council area. It lies near the head of Loch Maree in its magnificent valley, and serves as a junction between the main Ullapool road north, and that which heads west to the coast at Loch Torridon. Loch Maree was at one time also known as Loch Ewe, hence the village's apparently confused name.

== Community ==
Kinlochewe has a couple of shops, a hotel and bunkhouse, mountain chalets, several bed and breakfasts, a post office (with internet café), and one of very few petrol filling stations for many miles in any direction.

Buses connect the village with Gairloch, the railhead at Achnasheen, Dingwall and Inverness.

The village contains two churches, Kinlochewe Free Church, built in 1873, and the Church of Scotland.

To the north of the village, by the car park, is a First World War (1914–18) memorial. Two sergeants from the Seaforth Highlanders are remembered. Both were awarded the Distinguished Conduct Medal, and both later died of their wounds. Others from Canada and New Zealand are also remembered.

== Mountains ==
The village is at the south-east corner of the Beinn Eighe national nature reserve, centred on the mountain of that name, which includes some surviving areas of natural forest, the majority of which was cut down from the 16th century onwards for iron smelting which was the major industry in the area. A short but steep woodland trail runs through pine forest on the lower slopes of the reserve, giving fine views over Loch Maree and the mountain of Slioch on the other side of the loch. A longer, rougher mountain trail climbs further up the slopes of Beinn Eighe.

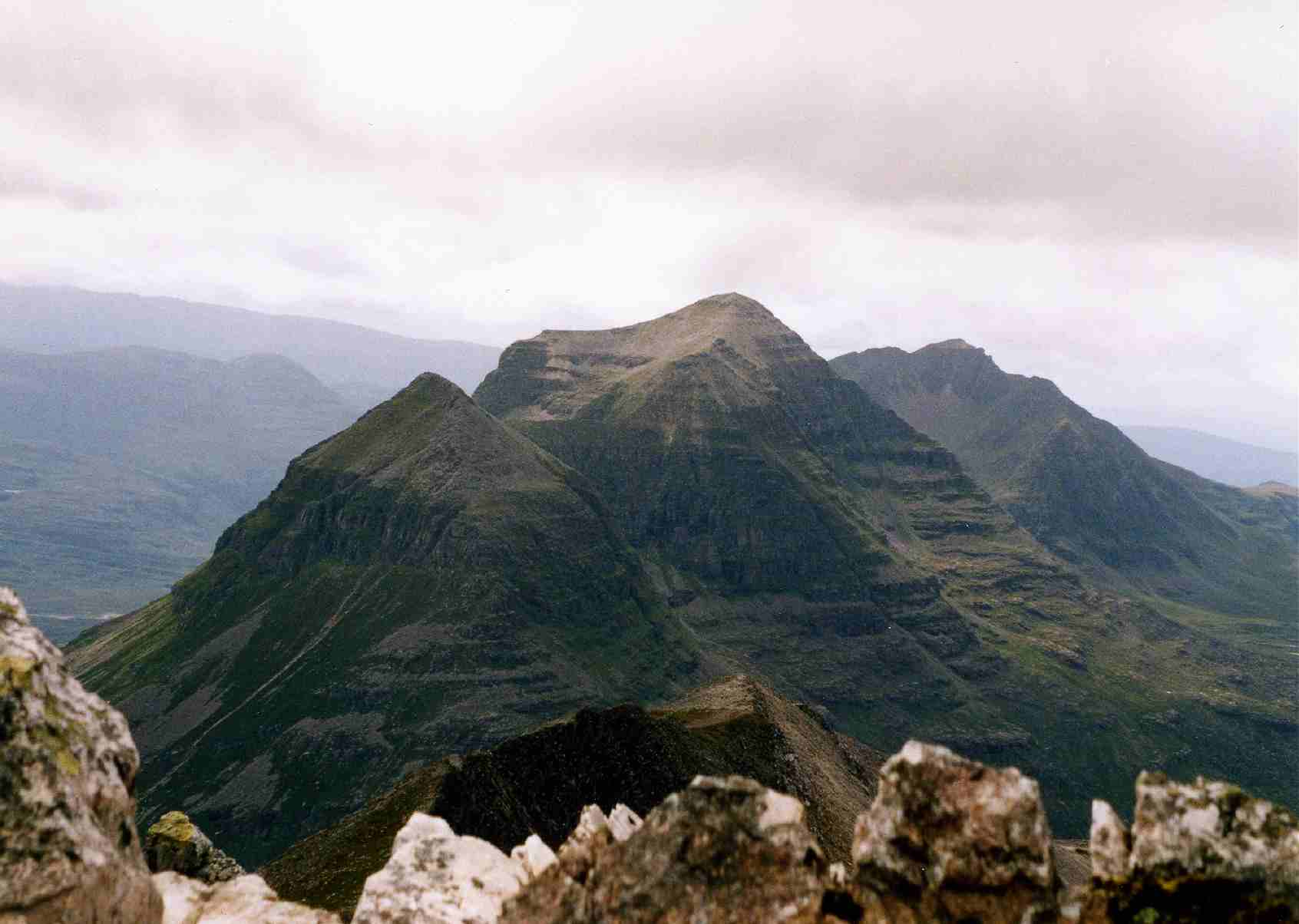
Liathach seen from Beinn Eighe. With the Munro “Top“ of Stuc a' Choire Dhuibh Bhig (915 metres) in the foreground and the two Munro summits in the background.

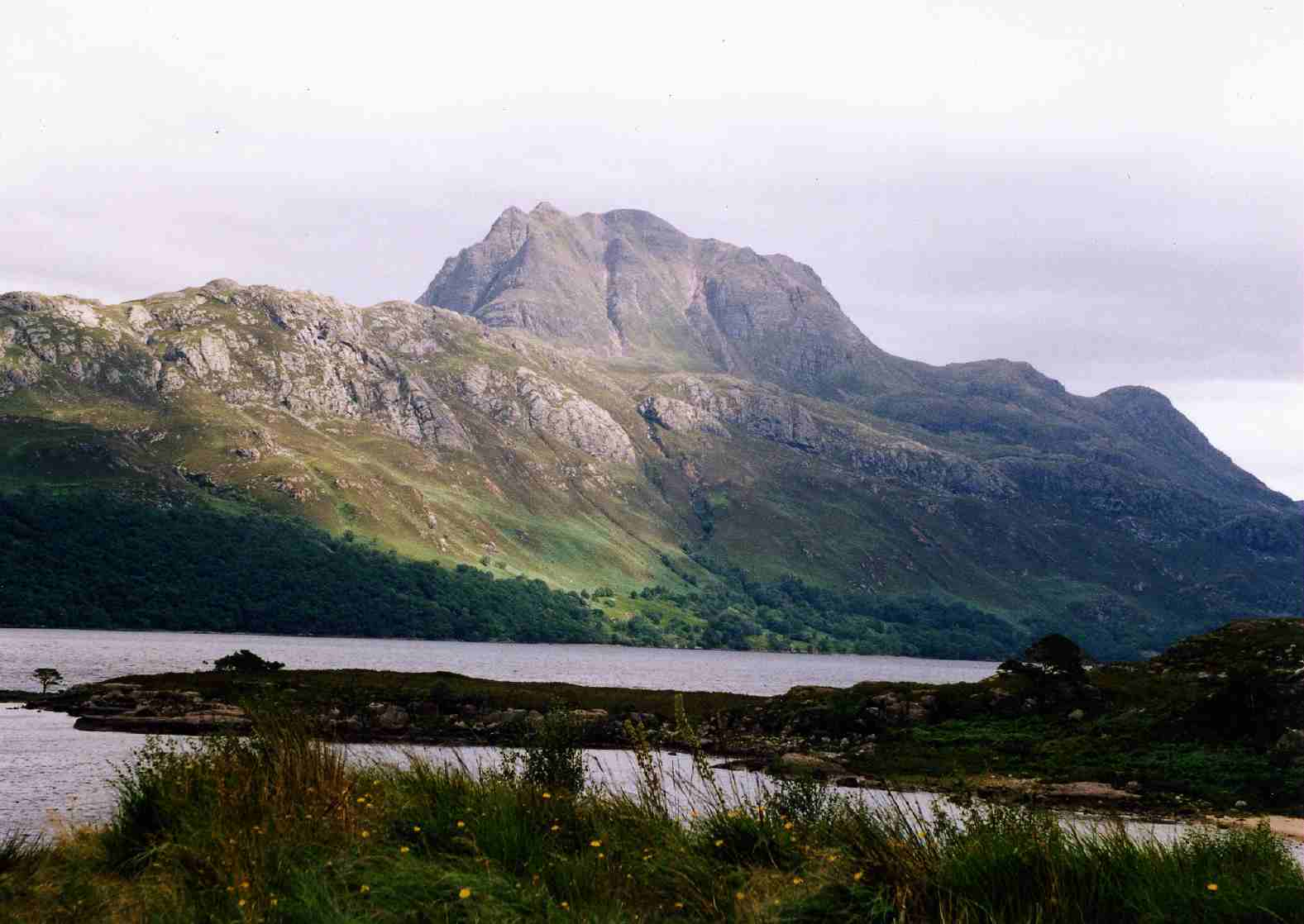
Slioch seen from the shores of Loch Maree

The area is well known for its spectacular mountain scenery, especially the Torridon Hills which includes such peaks as Beinn Eighe and Liathach. Although many peaks in the North-west highlands exhibit Torridon geology, the Torridon hills are generally considered only to be those in the Torridon Forest to the north of Glen Torridon. Specifically, these are:

- Liathach
- Beinn Eighe
- Beinn Alligin
- Beinn Dearg

The Torridon Hills exhibit some of the most dramatic mountain scenery in the British Isles, surpassed in grandeur probably only by the Cuillins of Skye. The landscape around the village is dominated by the Torridonian sandstone, a Precambrian and very old rock formation. Each of the Torridon Hills sits very much apart from each other, and they are often likened to castles. They have steep terraced sides, and broken summit crests, riven into many pinnacles. There are many steep gullies running down the terraced sides. The summit ridges provide excellent scrambling, and are popular with hill walkers and mountaineers. However, like many ridge routes, there are few escape points, so once committed, the scrambler or hillwalker must complete the entire ridge before descent.

== Roads ==
In 2005 and 2006, the narrow, winding A832 road that snakes into the valley and the village from Glen Docherty in the south-east, was widened and improved for easier access.

== Climate ==
Along with most of the British Isles and Scotland, Kinlochewe experiences a maritime climate (Köppen Cfb).

The weather station has the lowest average annual level of sunshine for any low level site in the British Isles, at just over 925 hours a year. Some of this may be due to the relief of the surrounding area rather than cloud cover obscuring the sun, but nonetheless, the western highlands are typically the cloudiest part of the country, in general not receiving much more than 1100 hours a year. Rainfall, at over 2,250 mm (89 in) a year, is higher than in most low-level sites in the British Isles. Temperature extremes since 1953 have ranged from −14.4 °C (6.1 °F) in February 1960, to 31.3 °C (88.3 °F) during July 2025. Kinlochewe also set one of the highest January temperatures recorded in the United Kingdom of 19.6 °C (67.3 °F) on 28 January 2024. The lowest temperature to be recorded in recent years was −11.0 °C (12.2 °F) during December 2010.

Climate data for Kinlochewe, elevation: 25 m (82 ft), 1991–2020 normals, extremes 1953–present
| Month | Jan | Feb | Mar | Apr | May | Jun | Jul | Aug | Sep | Oct | Nov | Dec | Year |
|---|---|---|---|---|---|---|---|---|---|---|---|---|---|
| Record high °C (°F) | 19.6 (67.3) | 17.6 (63.7) | 22.1 (71.8) | 26.4 (79.5) | 28.7 (83.7) | 30.3 (86.5) | 31.3 (88.3) | 30.5 (86.9) | 29.0 (84.2) | 24.4 (75.9) | 19.0 (66.2) | 16.7 (62.1) | 31.3 (88.3) |
| Mean daily maximum °C (°F) | 7.5 (45.5) | 7.9 (46.2) | 9.4 (48.9) | 12.1 (53.8) | 15.0 (59.0) | 16.9 (62.4) | 18.5 (65.3) | 18.1 (64.6) | 16.3 (61.3) | 12.8 (55.0) | 9.7 (49.5) | 7.5 (45.5) | 12.7 (54.9) |
| Daily mean °C (°F) | 4.4 (39.9) | 4.6 (40.3) | 5.9 (42.6) | 8.0 (46.4) | 10.5 (50.9) | 12.9 (55.2) | 14.7 (58.5) | 14.3 (57.7) | 12.5 (54.5) | 9.4 (48.9) | 6.5 (43.7) | 4.4 (39.9) | 9.0 (48.2) |
| Mean daily minimum °C (°F) | 1.3 (34.3) | 1.3 (34.3) | 2.4 (36.3) | 3.8 (38.8) | 6.0 (42.8) | 8.9 (48.0) | 10.8 (51.4) | 10.6 (51.1) | 8.7 (47.7) | 5.9 (42.6) | 3.2 (37.8) | 1.3 (34.3) | 5.4 (41.7) |
| Record low °C (°F) | −13.3 (8.1) | −14.4 (6.1) | −10.0 (14.0) | −6.8 (19.8) | −4.4 (24.1) | −1.9 (28.6) | 2.0 (35.6) | 1.3 (34.3) | −2.1 (28.2) | −5.9 (21.4) | −10.6 (12.9) | −14.0 (6.8) | −14.4 (6.1) |
| Average precipitation mm (inches) | 301.8 (11.88) | 246.9 (9.72) | 208.8 (8.22) | 124.7 (4.91) | 117.7 (4.63) | 104.9 (4.13) | 104.6 (4.12) | 140.7 (5.54) | 176.7 (6.96) | 235.3 (9.26) | 240.2 (9.46) | 276.7 (10.89) | 2,278.7 (89.71) |
| Average precipitation days (≥ 1.0 mm) | 21.5 | 19.3 | 19.6 | 16.1 | 15.1 | 15.2 | 16.4 | 17.0 | 17.3 | 20.4 | 20.7 | 21.5 | 220.1 |
| Mean monthly sunshine hours | 18.5 | 44.7 | 73.9 | 117.2 | 158.2 | 119.9 | 108.6 | 107.3 | 85.9 | 50.9 | 27.3 | 14.1 | 926.4 |
Source 1: Met Office
Source 2: Starlings Roost Weather

== Education ==
It is in the catchment area of Gairloch High School.

== See also ==
- Highlands of Scotland
