= Ruadh-stac Beag =

Mountain in Scotland

Coordinates: 57.596°N 5.396°W

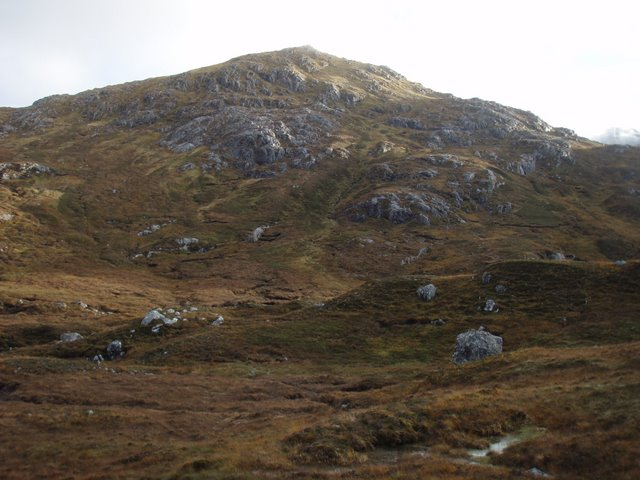
- Ruadh-stac Beag

Highest point
- Elevation: 896 m (2,940 ft)
- Prominence: 181 m (594 ft)
- Listing: Corbett, Marilyn

Geography
- Location: Wester Ross, Scotland
- Parent range: Northwest Highlands
- OS grid: NG972613
- Topo map: OS Landranger 19

Ruadh-stac Beag (896 m) is a mountain in the Northwest Highlands of Scotland. An outlier of the Munro Beinn Eighe but a mountain in its own right, it is located in the Torridon Hills of Wester Ross.

The mountain has rocky crags and steep slopes on all sides, but is usually climbed from the south. The nearest village is Kinlochewe.
