= Inverness Thistle F.C. (2024) =

Inverness Thistle
- Full name: Inverness Thistle Football Club
- Nickname: The Jags
- Founded: 2024
- Ground: Ferry Brae Park, North Kessock
- Capacity: 500 (0 seated)
- Coordinates: 57°30′20″N 4°15′30″W
- Manager: Drew Martin; Ryan Macleod
- League: North Caledonian League
- 2025–26: North Caledonian League, 7th of 12
Home colours

Inverness Thistle Football Club is a Scottish football club playing in the North Caledonian Football League, and are based in the city of Inverness in the Scottish Highlands.

== History ==
The first incarnation of Inverness Thistle was founded in 1885, playing at Kingsmills Park, and competing in the Highland League as a founding member, winning the title 8 times until the club was merged with rivals, Caledonian, in 1994, to form Caledonian Thistle, later Inverness Caledonian Thistle, in order to gain election to the Scottish Football League, and are currently playing in the Scottish Championship, the second tier of Scottish Football.

The second incarnation came in 2016, where a team used the name in the Inverness and District Amateur Football League before dissolving in 2018.

On 12 June 2024, discussions were opened between club and North Caledonian FA officials over joining the league for the 2025–26 season, with club officials clarifying that the formation of the side had nothing to do with the financial issues Inverness Caledonian Thistle were going through at the time. On 12 June 2025, exactly a year after the news officially broke of the talks opening, it was officially announced that Inverness Thistle were going to compete in the North Caledonian League.

On 27 July 2025, the club announced that local band, Torridon, would be the main sponsor on their shirts, with the band wearing the club’s kits as they took to the stage at the Belladrum Tartan Heart Festival weeks later.

== Ground ==
Prior to joining the North Caledonian League, like many clubs in the Inverness and District AFA, Inverness Thistle played at Bught Park. Upon the club being admitted to the league it was announced the side would be playing at Ferry Brae Park in North Kessock, due to the previous tenants, Inverness Athletic moving to Pavilion Park in Muir of Ord.

== Seasons ==
Season	North Caledonian Football League								North of Scotland Cup	North Caledonian Cup	Jock Mackay Cup	Football Times Cup
Season	Pld	W	D	L	GF	GA	Pts	Pos	North of Scotland Cup	North Caledonian Cup	Jock Mackay Cup	Football Times Cup
2025–26	22	8	2	12	30	41	–11	26	Did not participate	TBD	TBD	Did not participate
