= Herbertus =

Scientific classification
- Kingdom: Plantae
- Division: Marchantiophyta
- Class: Jungermanniopsida
- Order: Jungermanniales
- Family: Herbertaceae
- Genus: Herbertus; Gray

Synonyms
- Chalubinskia Rehmann ex Sim, 1916; Chatubinskia Rehmann ex C.H.Wright, 1917; Sendtnera Endl.

Genus of liverworts

Herbertus is a genus of liverworts in the family Herbertaceae. The genus has a broad global or cosmopolitan distribution, including sixteen species that occur in Eurasia:

== Species ==
As accepted by GBIF;

- Herbertus aduncus (Dicks.) Gray – North America and East Asia
- Herbertus angustevittatus (Stephani) Fulford
- Herbertus angustissimus (Herzog) H.A.Mill.
- Herbertus arcticus (Inoue & Steere) Schljakov
- Herbertus armitanus (Steph.) H.A.Mill. – Indochina to Papua New Guinea
- Herbertus asparus Tixier
- Herbertus azoricus (Steph.) P.W.Richards
- Herbertus bivittatus Spruce
- Herbertus borealis Crundw. – Beinn Eighe, Scotland
- Herbertus buchii Juslén – Amur Province, Russia
- Herbertus cancerina Herzog
- Herbertus capensis (Stephani) Sim
- Herbertus ceylanicus (Steph.) Abeyw. – Sri Lanka, Indonesia, Malaysia
- Herbertus circinatus (Steph.) H.A.Mill. – Indonesia, Malaysia, Papua New Guinea and the Philippines
- Herbertus colombianus G.Reenen
- Herbertus costaricensis Stephani
- Herbertus darjeelingensis H.A.Mill.
- Herbertus decurrens (Stephani) H.A.Mill.
- Herbertus delavayi (Steph.) Steph.
- Herbertus dicranus (Gottsche, Lindenb. & Nees) Trevis. – western North America, East Asia, East Africa
- Herbertus divaricatus (Herzog) H.A.Mill.
- Herbertus divergens (Stephani) Herzog
- Herbertus doggeltianus (Stephani) Demaret
- Herbertus durandii (Steph.) Herzog
- Herbertus elliottii (Spruce) Fulford
- Herbertus evittatus (Steph.) H.A.Mill.
- Herbertus fleischeri (Stephani) H.A.Mill.
- Herbertus fragilis (Stephani) Herzog
- Herbertus gaochienii X.Fu
- Herbertus giraldianus (Stephani) Nichols
- Herbertus giulianettii (Stephani) H.A.Mill.
- Herbertus gracilis (Mont.) Steph.
- Herbertus grossevittatus (Stephani) S.W.Arnell ex Grolle
- Herbertus grossispinus Fulford
- Herbertus guangdongii P.J.Lin & Piippo – Hainan Island, China
- Herbertus hawaiiensis H.A.Mill.
- Herbertus helleri (Steph.) W.E.Nicholson
- Herbertus herpocladioides E.B.Scott & H.A.Mill.
- Herbertus himalayanus (Stephani) Herzog
- Herbertus huerlimannii H.A.Mill.
- Herbertus hutchinsiae (Gottsche & Rabenh.) A.Evans – Ireland to Norway
- Herbertus javanicus (Stephani) H.A.Mill.
- Herbertus juniperoideus (Sw.) Grolle
- Herbertus kurzii (Steph.) R.S.Chopra – China, Bhutan, India and Nepal
- Herbertus leratii (Steph.) H.A.Mill.
- Herbertus limbatus (Stephani) Herzog
- Herbertus lobatus (Stephani) Demaret
- Herbertus lochobasis H.A.Mill.
- Herbertus lonchobasis H.A.Mill.
- Herbertus longifissus Steph.
- Herbertus longispinus J.B.Jack & Steph. – Taiwan, Indonesia, Malaysia and the Philippines
- Herbertus mascarenicus (Stephani) S.W.Arnell ex Váňa
- Herbertus mastigophoroides H.A.Mill.
- Herbertus mauritianus N.G.Hodgetts
- Herbertus minima Horik.
- Herbertus minor Horik.
- Herbertus nepalensis H.A.Mill.
- Herbertus nilgerriensis (Stephani) H.A.Mill.
- Herbertus norenus D.G.Long, D.Bell & H.H.Blom – Shetland and Norway
- Herbertus oblongifolius (Stephani) Gradst. & Cleef
- Herbertus oldfieldianus (Steph.) Rodway
- Herbertus parisii (Stephani) H.A.Mill.
- Herbertus pectinatus Herzog
- Herbertus penicillatus Herzog
- Herbertus perrottetii (Stephani) Abeyw.
- Herbertus pilifer Schiffn. – Indonesia, Malaysia and Papua New Guinea
- Herbertus pinnatus (Stephani) H.A.Mill.
- Herbertus pocsii N.G.Hodgetts
- Herbertus pseudoceylanicus S.Hatt.
- Herbertus pumilus Steph.
- Herbertus pusillus (Stephani) S.Hatt.
- Herbertus ramosus (Steph.) H.A.Mill. – Sri Lanka, Thailand, Vietnam, Indonesia and Papua New Guinea
- Herbertus runcinatus (Taylor) Trevis.
- Herbertus sendtneri (Nees) Lindb. – Austrian Alps, Asia, North America
- Herbertus seriatus (Stephani) S.W.Arnell
- Herbertus serratus Spruce
- Herbertus setiger (Stephani) H.A.Mill.
- Herbertus spicatus N.G.Hodgetts
- Herbertus spinosissimus (Hook.f. & Taylor) Trevis.
- Herbertus stenoschizon Herzog
- Herbertus stramineus (Dumort.) Trevis. – United Kingdom, Faroe Islands, Norway, Iceland and Alaska
- Herbertus streimannii M.L.So
- Herbertus stuhlmannii (Stephani) Demaret
- Herbertus subdentatus (Stephani) Fulford
- Herbertus subnivalis S.Winkl.
- Herbertus subrotundatus X.Fu & Y.J.Yi
- Herbertus tenuis A.Evans
- Herbertus tutuilana Pearson
- Herbertus udarii D.Kumar & N.Manocha
- Herbertus vulcanicola Herzog
- Herbertus wichurae Stephani
- Herbertus zantenii S.Hatt. & Grolle
