= Herbertus borealis =

Conservation status
- Vulnerable (IUCN 3.1)

Scientific classification
- Kingdom: Plantae
- Division: Marchantiophyta
- Class: Jungermanniopsida
- Order: Jungermanniales
- Family: Herbertaceae
- Genus: Herbertus
- Species: H. borealis

Binomial name
- Herbertus borealis Crundw.

Synonyms
- Herbertus delavayi

Species of liverwort

Herbertus borealis is a species of liverwort in the family Herbertaceae known as northern prongwort. It was described in 1970 by Alan Crundwell. It is endemic to Scotland, where it is found only in the Beinn Eighe nature reserve, and lives in dwarf shrub heath alongside other large liverworts such as Anastrophyllum donnianum, Bazzania tricrenata and Pleurozia purpurea. A closely related species, described in 2012 as Herbertus norenus and known as "Viking prongwort", is known from Shetland and Norway and was formerly confused with H. borealis.

Following molecular studies and based on morphological grounds, it was synonymized with H. delavayi, a species from Yunan, China. However, after further study on key differences of DNA barcode sequences and key distinguishing features it was recommended these species remain distinct. These variations were later suggested to arise from environmental conditions, arguing for of H. Borealis to be further synonymized with multiple other members of the Herbertus family, including H. buchii, H. dicranus, H. kurzii, H. longifissus, H. norenus, and H. stramineus under the broader H. aduncus. This was later challenged by the claim that they often grow in close proximity, adding that it does not account for the clear morphological differences that arise from the small genetic variations, and has been subsequently rejected by some. More research is therefore proposed as this debate remains unresolved.
