= Gairloch High School =

- Ard-Sgoil Ghearrloch

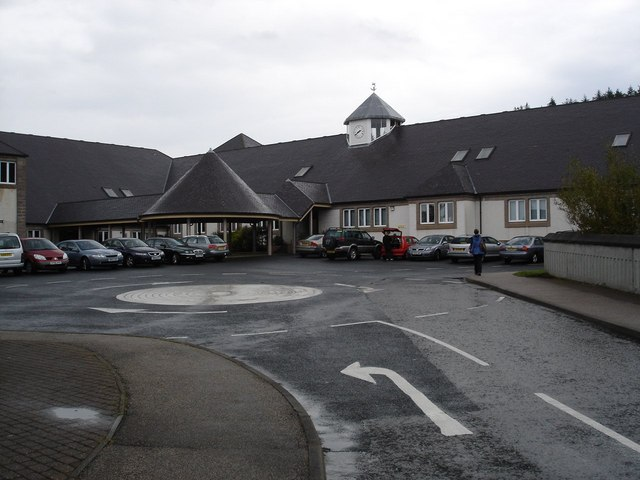

Location
- Gairloch, IV21 2BP; Scotland
- 57.72829°N 5.69275°W

Information
- Former name: Achtercairn Secondary
- Type: Secondary school, state funded
- Established: ~1880s
- Local authority: Highland
- Staff: 22
- Enrolment: ~160
- Colours: Navy and Green
- Website: www.gairlochhigh.org.uk

Gairloch High School (Gaelic: Àrd-Sgoil Gheàrrloch) is a six-year secondary school in Gairloch, Scotland. Being situated in a remote area of the Highlands, it serves a large catchment area, with over 70% many of the pupils relying on school transport. Communities in its catchment area include Kinlochewe, Second Coast, and Shieldaig. The school logo incorporates a celtic knot.

== History ==
The school was originally called Achtercairn Secondary; it started with only two class years. In 1979 this was increased to four years. In 1983 the school gained six-year status, which remains to this day. It was then that the school was officially named Gairloch High School.

== School building ==
The current building was opened in August 1994 at a cost of £5 million. Previously, classes were held in huts, which quickly became unsuitable for use due to the small amount of space. Today the school shares playing field space with the neighbouring Gairloch Primary School. The building also shares facilities used by Gairloch Leisure Centre, including a sports hall, gym, all-weather pitch and climbing wall. The local library is also part of the school and is used by both students and members of the public.

== Houses ==
There are three Houses at Gairloch High School, all of which are named after bodies of water in the local area: the River Kerry, Loch Maree and Loch Tollaidh. They have associated colors: blue for Kerry, red for Maree, and yellow for Tollaidh.
