= Torridon =

Coordinates: 57.55°N 5.52°W

Torridon: Scottish Gaelic: Toirbheartan
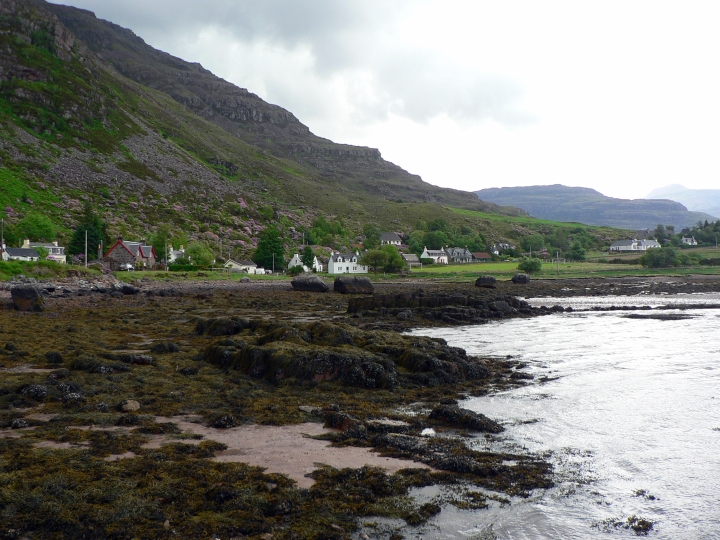
- Torridon village

- Location within the Highland council area
- OS grid reference: NG8956
- Community council: Torridon and Kinlochewe
- Council area: Highland
- Lieutenancy area: Ross and Cromarty
- Country: Scotland
- Sovereign state: United Kingdom
- Post town: Achnasheen
- Postcode district: IV22
- Dialling code: 01445
- Police: Scotland
- Fire: Scottish
- Ambulance: Scottish
- UK Parliament: Inverness, Skye and West Ross-shire
- Scottish Parliament: Caithness, Sutherland and Ross

Torridon (Scottish Gaelic: Toirbheartan) is a small village in Wester Ross, in the Northwest Highlands of Scotland. The name is also applied to the area surrounding the village, particularly the Torridon Hills, mountains to the north of Glen Torridon. The village lies on the shore of Loch Torridon.

== Location ==
Torridon is on the west coast of Scotland, 109 miles (175 km) north of Fort William and 80 miles (130 km) west of Inverness. Situated in an area well known to climbers, photographers, wildlife enthusiasts, hikers, and visitors from around the world, the surrounding mountains rise steeply to 3,500 feet (1,100 m) from the deep sea lochs. The village lies at the north of the bay at the head of Loch Torridon, with the village of Annat lying at the south end of the bay. The name Torridon is however often applied to the whole area at the head of the loch, including both settlements.

Within Torridon there is youth hostel operated by Hostelling Scotland. The area's main hotel, The Torridon, is situated in Annat.

== Torridon Hills ==
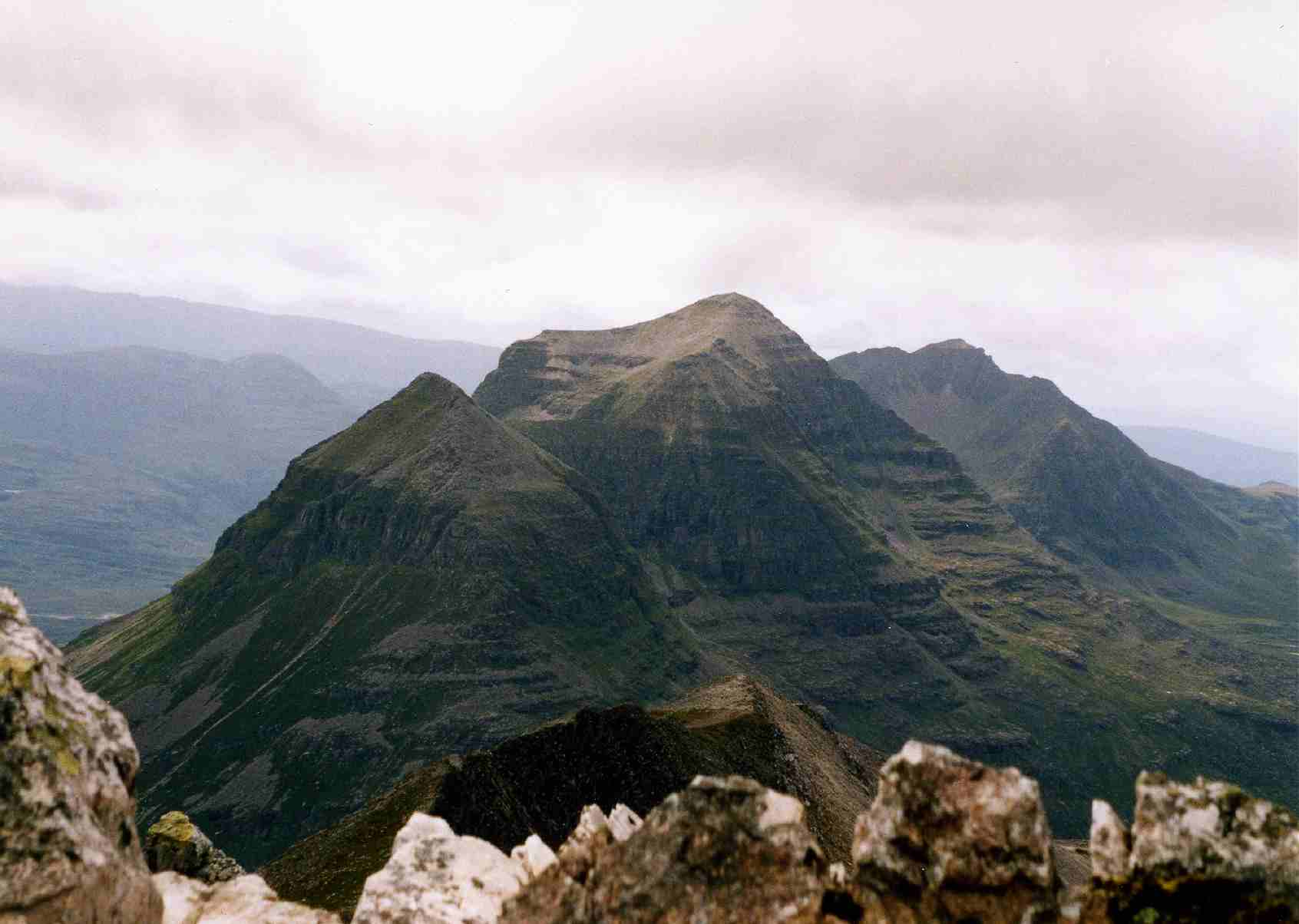
Liathach seen from Beinn Eighe. With the Munro “Top“ of Stuc a' Choire Dhuibh Bhig (915 metres) in the foreground and the two Munro summits in the background.

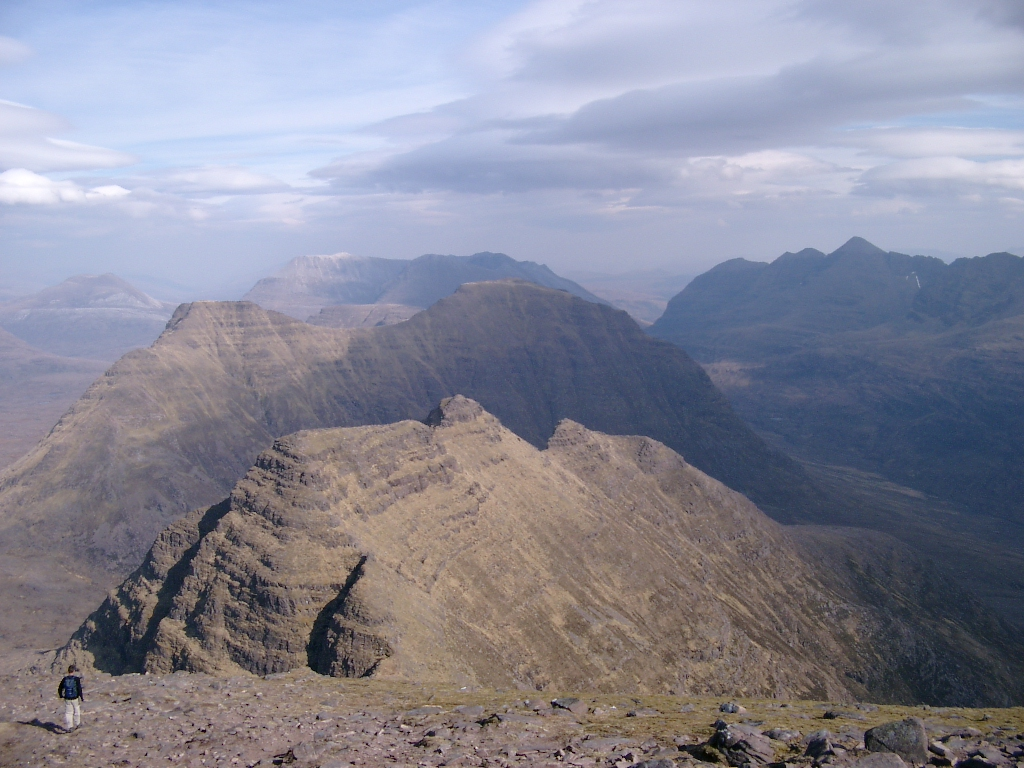
View east from Sgurr Mhòr over the "Horns"

The Torridon Hills surround the village. The name is usually applied to the mountains to the north of Glen Torridon, which are among the most dramatic and spectacular peaks in the British Isles and made of some of the oldest rocks in the world. Many are over 3,000 feet (914.4 metres) high, so are considered Munros. Each of the hills sits very much apart from the others, and they are often likened to castles. They have steep terraced sides, and broken summit crests, riven into many pinnacles. There are numerous steep gullies running down the terraced sides from the peaks. The summit ridges provide excellent scrambling, and are popular with hillwalkers and mountaineers. However, like many ridge routes, there are few escape points, so once committed, the scrambler or hillwalker must complete the entire ridge before descent.

=== Geology ===
The Torridon Hills are mainly made of a type of sandstone, known as Torridonian sandstone (see Geology of Scotland), which over time has become eroded to produce the unique characteristics of the Torridon Hills. In geology, Torridonian describes a series of proterozoic arenaceous sedimentary rocks of Precambrian age. They are amongst the oldest rocks in Britain, and sit on yet older rocks, Lewisian gneiss. Some of the highest peaks, such as Beinn Eighe, are crowned by white Cambrian quartzite, which gives those peaks a distinctive appearance. Some of the quartzite contains fossilised worm burrows and known as pipe rock. It is around 500 million years old. The strata are largely horizontal, and have weathered into terraces on the mountains.

There are numerous other mountains outside the immediate area of Loch Torridon which have the same characteristics, such as An Teallach near Ullapool.

=== Major peaks ===
Although many peaks in the Northwest Highlands exhibit Torridon geology, the Torridon Hills are generally considered only to be those in the Torridon Forest to the north of Glen Torridon. Specifically, these are:

- Liathach
- Beinn Eighe
- Beinn Alligin
- Beinn Dearg
- Baosbheinn

Hills between Glen Torridon and Strath Carron include:

- Beinn Liath Mhòr
- Sgorr Ruadh
- Maol Cheann-dearg
- Beinn Damh
- An Ruadh-stac
- Fuar Tholl

The Torridon Hills exhibit some of the most dramatic mountain scenery in the British Isles, perhaps surpassed in grandeur only by the Cuillins of Skye.

== History ==
The Torridon estate was sold in 1831 to Colonel McBarnet, who cleared its tenants for sheep farming, and was later bought by Duncan Darroch of Gourock, who ran it as a deer forest, restored grazings to the crofters and died at Torridon House in 1910; a roadside stone placed by his widow records that a hundred men of the estate carried his coffin from the house. After Darroch's death the northern part of the estate was bought by the whisky magnate Lord Woolavington, who put it on the market in 1922 and sold it in 1924 to the Canadian industrialist Sir Charles Gordon, president of the Bank of Montreal, who summered at Torridon House until his death in 1939. Gordon's heirs sold Torridon House and its lands in 1947 to Richard Gunter, after whose death in 1960 they were bought by the Earl of Lovelace; on the fourth earl's death in 1964 the estate was accepted by the Inland Revenue in part payment of death duties and was transferred to the National Trust for Scotland in 1967. The Gordon family kept the adjoining Wester Alligin land until 1968, when Sir Charles's sons gave it to the Trust in memory of their parents.

== Torridon National Nature Reserve ==
Much of the land to the north of the village now forms a national nature reserve (NNR), having being designated as such in August 2026. The designated area covers 5,072 hectares (12,530 acres), and includes the whole of Beinn Alligin and Liathach, as well as the south-western slopes of Beinn Eighe; the remainder of Beinn Eighe forms a separate NNR. The Torridon estate, which now forms the NNR, has been owned and managed by the National Trust for Scotland since 1967.

=== Flora and fauna ===
The NNR supports a wide variety of habitats and species of national and international importance.

Trees are relatively sparse across the reserve due to the wet climate; however birch, rowan and Scots pine can be found on steeper ground and among boulder fields. There are many areas covered with dwarf shrubs, heathlands, and blanket bogs.

Wildlife in the area includes a wide variety of bird life, including seabirds and waders such as ringed plovers, shelducks, mallards, wigeons, turnstones, curlews, greenshanks, redshanks, and snipe. Golden eagles may also be seen. Mammal species present include otters and pine martens, and the reserve is home to around 300 red deer.

== Governance ==
For local government purposes Torridon lies within the council area of Highland. It forms part of the ward of Wester Ross, Strathpeffer and Lochalsh, which elects 4 councilors to Highland Council under the single transferable vote electoral system.

In the Scottish Parliament Torridon is represented as part of the Caithness, Sutherland and Ross constituency. The seat has been held by David Green of the Scottish Liberal Democrats since the 2026 Scottish Parliament election. Torridon also forms part of the Highlands and Islands electoral region, which elects a further seven additional members, in addition to the eight constituency MSPs, to produce a form of proportional representation for the region as a whole.

In the UK Parliament Torridon is represented as part of the Inverness, Skye and West Ross-shire constituency. The seat has been held by Angus MacDonald of the Liberal Democrats since the 2024 United Kingdom general election.

Torridon shares a community council with nearby Kinlochewe, Torridon and Kinlochewe.

== Triathlon ==
Torridon hosts the annual Celtman Extreme Triathlon since June 2011. It is considered one of the most challenging triathlons in the world. The 3.4 km swim takes place in Loch Shieldaig while the 202 km bike leg is notable for the strong winds affecting competitors. Finally the 42 km run takes in two Munros during the race over the Beinn Eighe range.

== Gallery ==
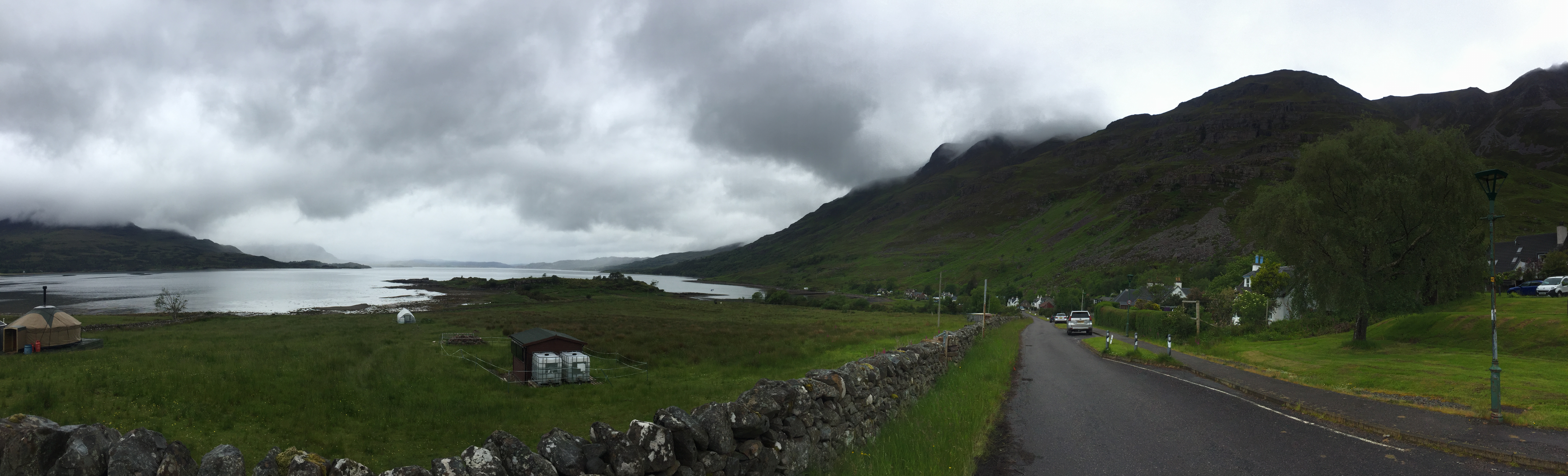
Torridon panoramic view (June 2024)

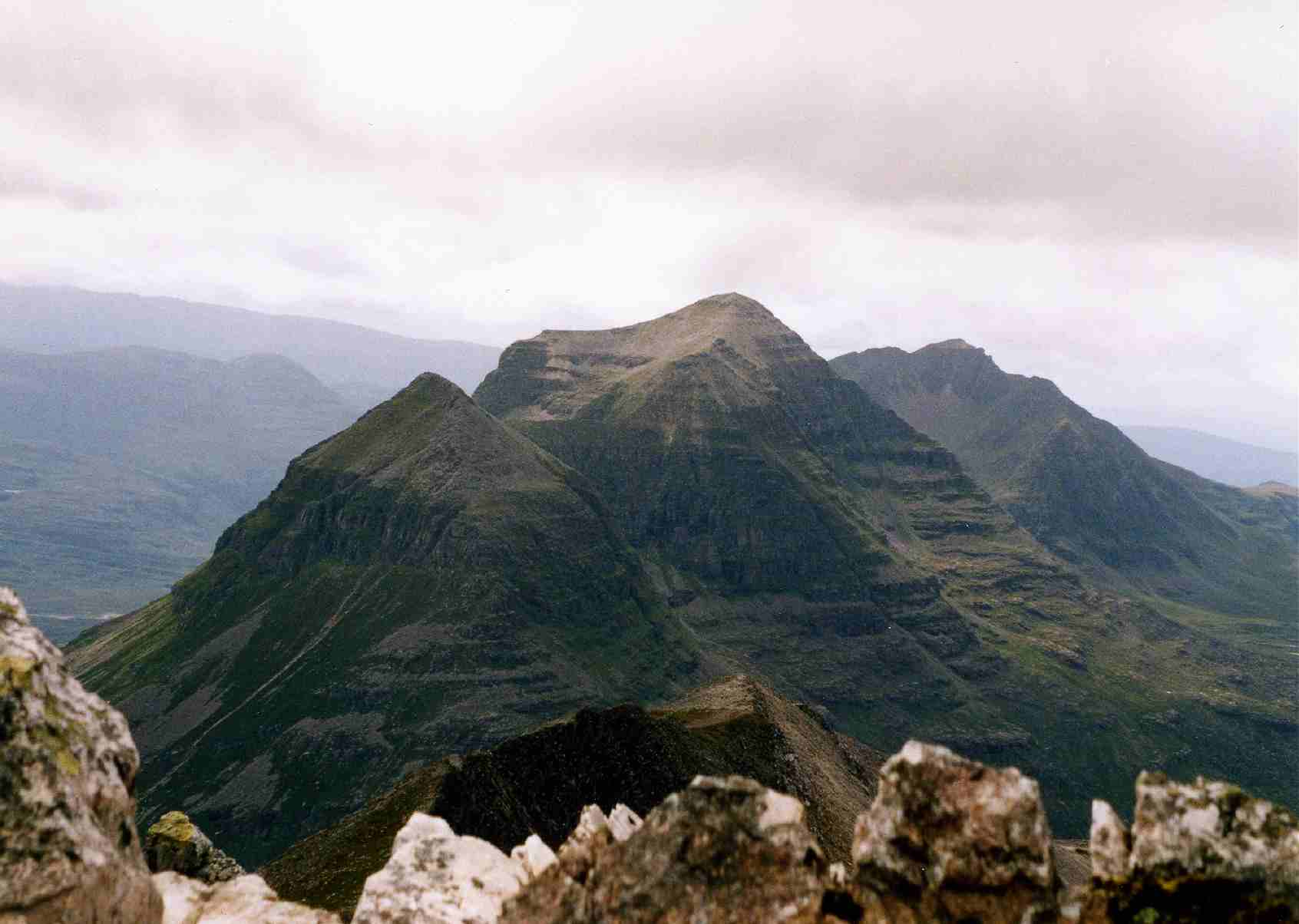
Liathach seen from Beinn Eighe

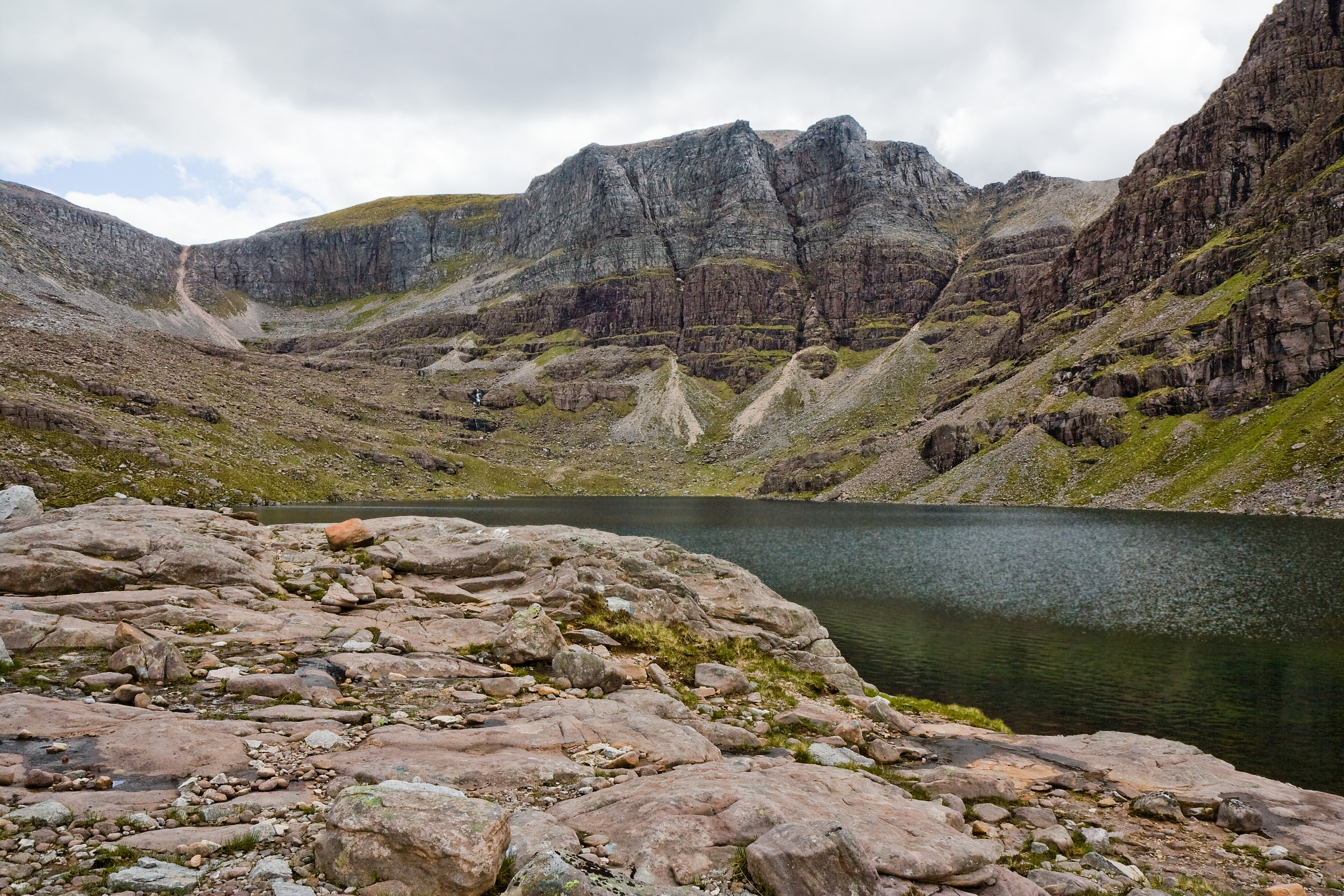
The triple buttresses of Coire Mhic Fearchair behind Beinn Eighe

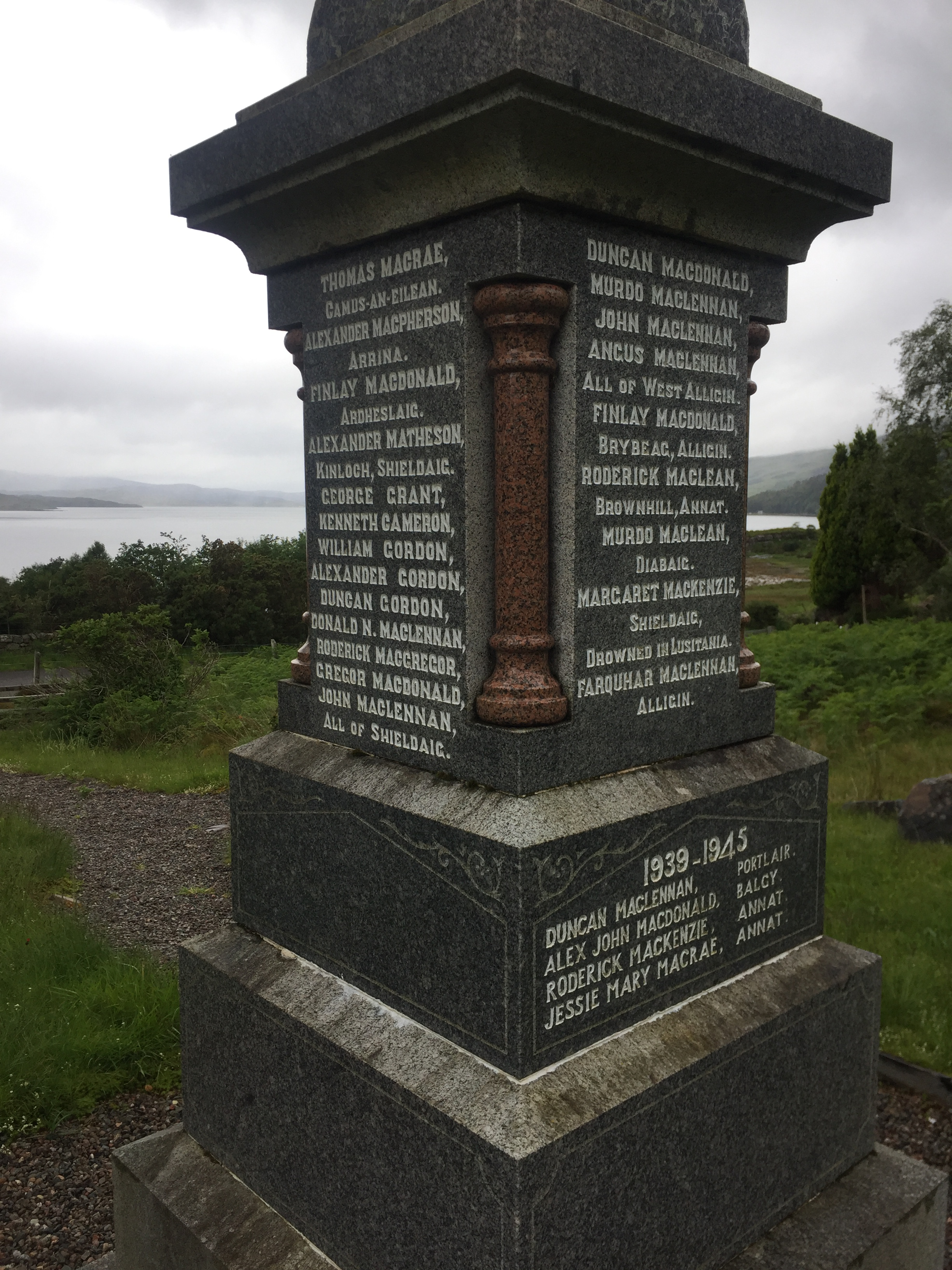
Torridon War memorial

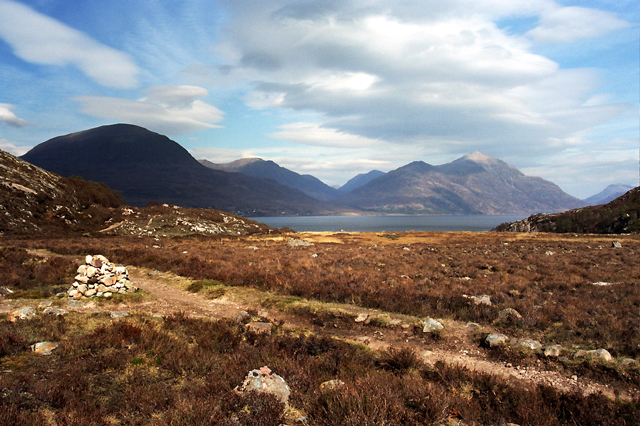
The Torridon Hills, viewed from the Shieldaig peninsula.

== See also ==
- Torridon folk rock band
- Shieldaig
- W A Poucher
- Highlands of Scotland
