= Beinn Dearg (Torridon) =

One of the Torridon Mountains in the highlands of Scotland

Coordinates: 57.588762°N 5.521364°W

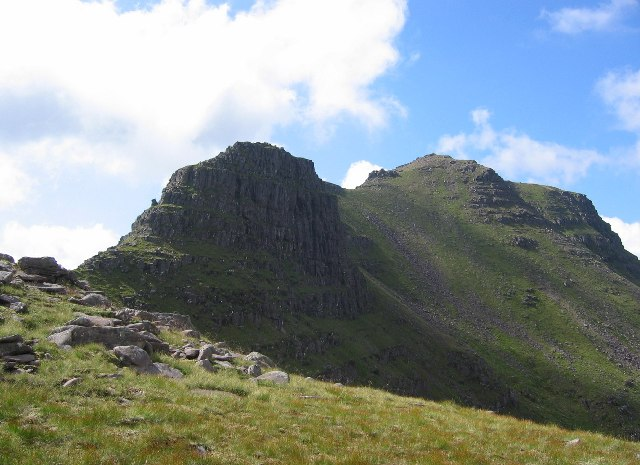
- Beinn Dearg from the east

Highest point
- Elevation: 914 m (2,999 ft)
- Prominence: c. 469 m
- Listing: Marilyn, Corbett

Naming
- English translation: red mountain
- Language of name: Gaelic
- Pronunciation: /ˌbeɪn ˈdʒɛræk/

Geography
- Location: Torridon, Scotland
- OS grid: NG895608
- Topo map: Ordnance Survey Landranger 19, 24

Beinn Dearg is the fourth highest of the Torridon Hills in the highlands of Scotland. Beinn Dearg offers all the typical features of a Torridon hill, with steeply terraced rocky sides dissected by near vertical gullies. The summit ridge is an airy crest that offers some easy scrambling; alternatively this can be avoided by following a path that traverses the terraces on the southern side.

Unlike its higher neighbours, the hill just misses out on the height of 3,000 ft, and therefore lacks any peaks of Munro status. For this reason, if no other, it is climbed far less than the three major mountains surrounding it. In 2007, the Munro Society commissioned CMCR Ltd to survey Beinn Dearg in order to ascertain the precise height of the summit, and determine whether it might in fact be correctly categorised as a Munro. The summit was found to be 2.42 ft short.

== Ascent ==
The most normal starting point for climbing Beinn Dearg is the car park at the foot of the Abhainn Coire Mhic Nobuil, which is also the normal start point for an ascent of Beinn Alligin. From here the river is followed until the confluence with the Allt à Bhealaich. This burn may be followed up to the low bealach or saddle between Beinn Dearg and Beinn Alligin, at which point the walker can strike upwards for the western end of the summit ridge.

Alternative routes of ascent may be made by continuing to follow the Abhainn Coire Mhic Nobuil under the south side of the hill. Two gullies offer routes to the summit ridge, either side of the subsidiary peak of Carn na Feòla at the eastern end of the 4 km long ridge. By combining two of the three routes described above one may complete a traverse of Beinn Dearg.

The summit offers excellent views of the well known surrounding peaks of Torridon.
