= Annat, Highland =

Coordinates: 57.532°N 5.51651°W

Annat: Scottish Gaelic: An Annaid
- Location within the Highland council area
- OS grid reference: NG882546
- Council area: Highland
- Country: Scotland
- Sovereign state: United Kingdom
- Postcode district: IV22 2
- Police: Scotland
- Fire: Scottish
- Ambulance: Scottish
- UK Parliament: Ross, Skye and Lochaber
- Scottish Parliament: Caithness, Sutherland and Ross

Annat (Scottish Gaelic: An Annaid) is a small village at the eastern end of Upper Loch Torridon in Wester Ross, in the Highland council area of Scotland. It is about 2 km south-east of the village of Torridon, on the A896 singletrack road.
