= Shieldaig Island =

Island in Highland, Scotland

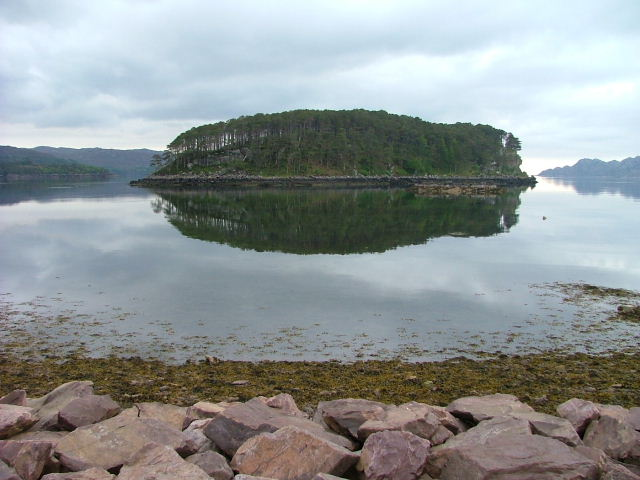

Location
- Shieldaig Island shown within Highland
- OS grid reference: NG8100554312
- Coordinates: 57.525631°N 5.6591314°W

Physical geography
- Area: 13 ha (32 acres)
- Highest elevation: 41 m (134 ft)

Administration
- Council area: Highland
- Country: Scotland
- Sovereign state: United Kingdom

Shieldaig Island is an island in Loch Shieldaig, in the council area of Highland, Scotland. It is located 400 metres (1/4 nmi) offshore from Shieldaig. Its area is 13 hectares (32 acres) and it rises to a maximum elevation of 41 metres (134 feet). Shieldaig Island has been the property of the National Trust for Scotland since 1970 and has a thriving bird population. It is almost entirely covered in Scots pine which was thought to have been planted over 100 years ago. The seeds were probably taken from Speyside.
