= Shieldaig =

Coordinates: 57.521°N 5.651°W

Shieldaig: Scottish Gaelic: Sìldeag; Scots: Shieldaig
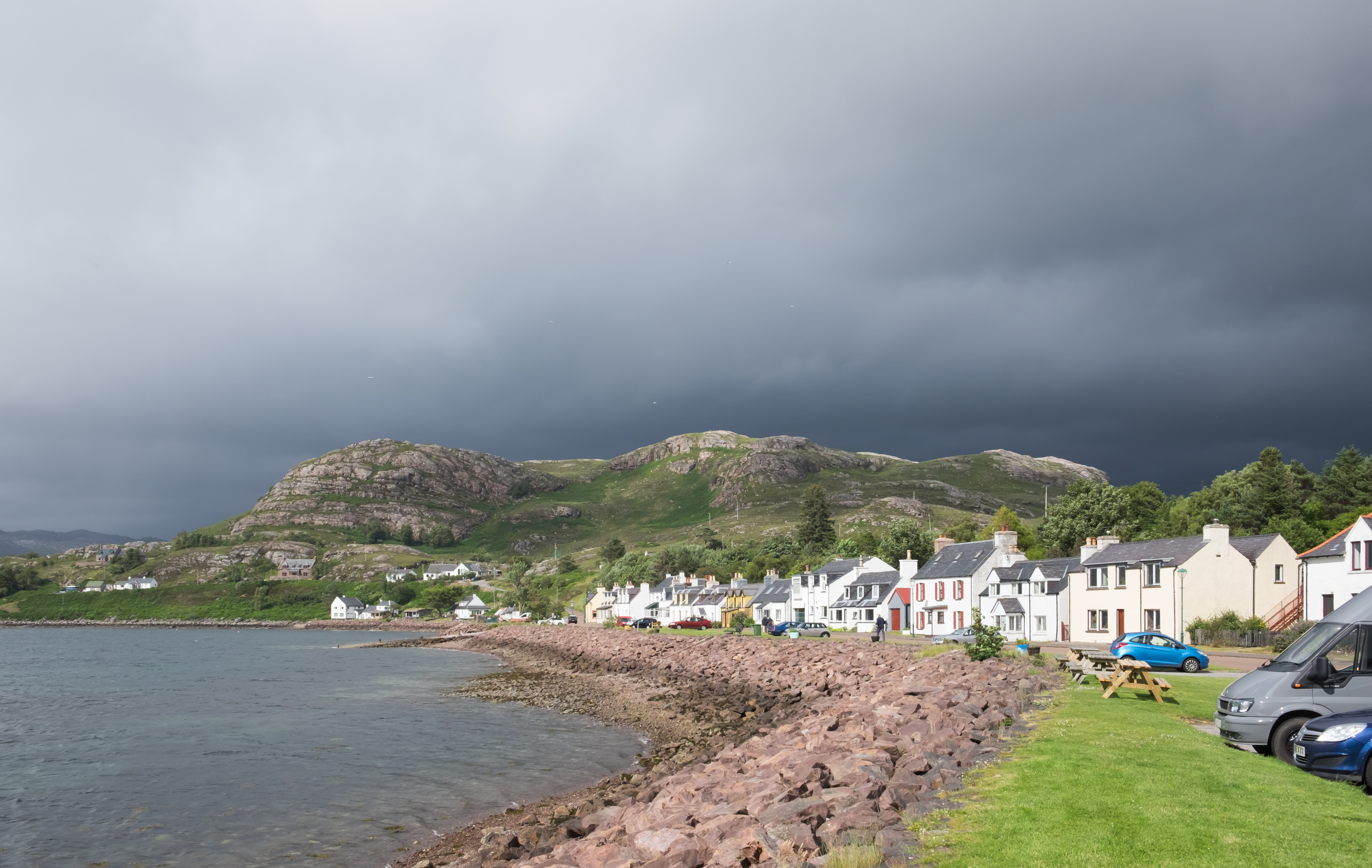
- Shieldaig looking north along the sea-front

- Location within the Ross and Cromarty area
- OS grid reference: NG815539
- Civil parish: Applecross
- Council area: Highland
- Lieutenancy area: Ross and Cromarty
- Country: Scotland
- Sovereign state: United Kingdom
- Post town: Strathcarron
- Postcode district: IV54
- Dialling code: 01520
- Police: Scotland
- Fire: Scottish
- Ambulance: Scottish
- UK Parliament: Inverness, Skye and West Ross-shire
- Scottish Parliament: Caithness, Sutherland and Ross

Shieldaig (Scottish Gaelic: Sìldeag; Old Norse: síld-vík, lit. 'herring bay') is a village in Wester Ross in the Northwest Highlands, in the Scottish council area of Highland.

== Geography and history ==
The village was founded in 1800 with a view to training up seamen for war against Napoleon. After his (initial) defeat and exile to Elba, the community found itself a new role as a fishing village. The small island just offshore never had its tall pines harvested to rig warships, and has now become a nature sanctuary.

The name of the village is derived from the Old Norse síld-vík, meaning 'herring bay'.

Shieldaig is a community of around 85 people, with its own school, a small pub, a village hall, a church and two restaurants. It is much used as a holiday destination, attracting those interested in fishing, touring the North Coast 500 or explorers of the Torridon Hills, which are a few miles around the coast.

Shieldaig holds a community fête in the second weekend of August.

== Education ==
It is in the catchment area of Gairloch High School.

== Another Shieldaig ==
12 miles (19 kilometres) to the north lies another Shieldaig, a small settlement on the south shore of Loch Gairloch.

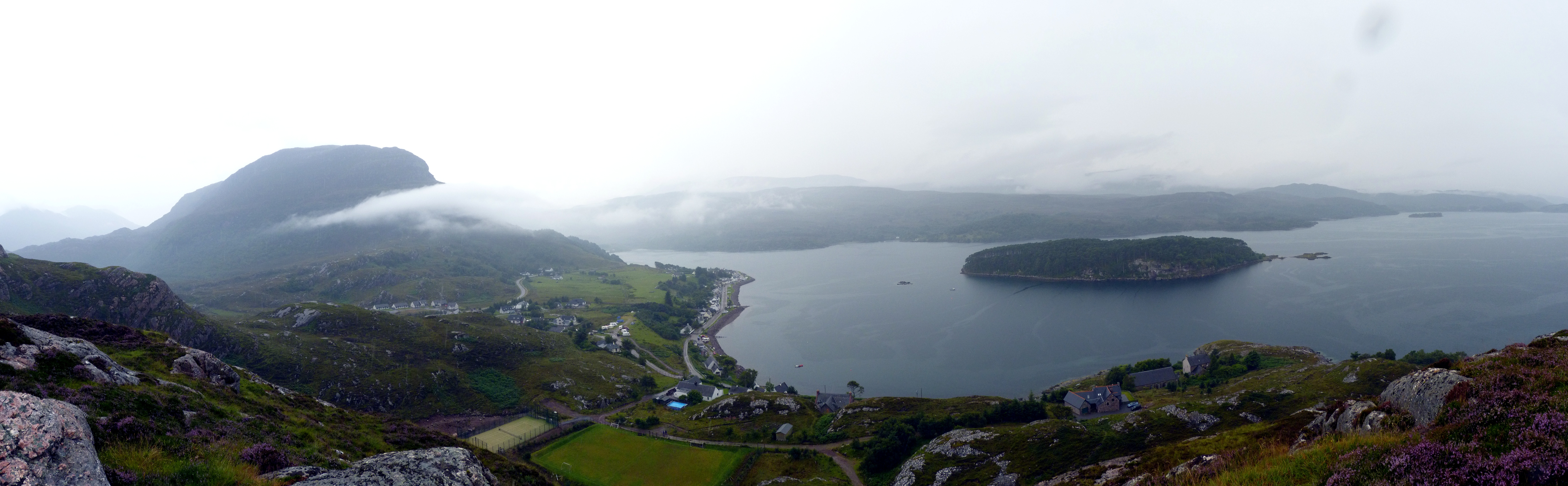
Shieldaig from above

== See also ==
- Shieling
