= Beinn Eighe =

Mountain massif in the Scottish Highlands

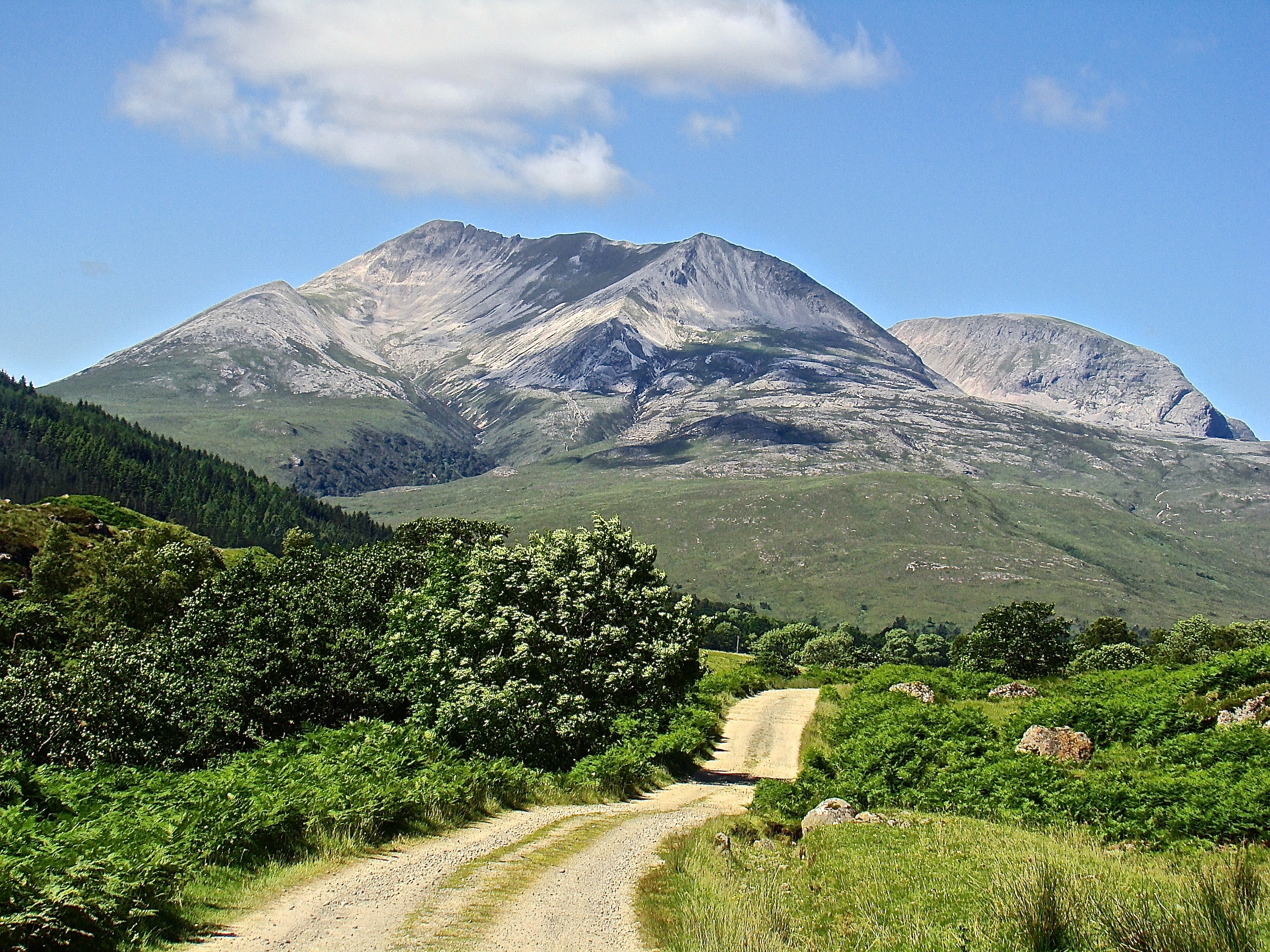
- Beinn Eighe from the track alongside Abhainn Bruachaig, east of Kinlochewe.

Highest point
- Elevation: 1,010 m (3,310 ft)
- Prominence: 632 m (2,073 ft)
- Parent peak: Liathach
- Listing: Munro, Marilyn

Naming
- English translation: file mountain
- Language of name: Gaelic
- Pronunciation: Scottish Gaelic: [peɲ ˈe.ə ˈrˠuəs̪t̪ak ˈmoːɾ]

Geography
- Location: Torridon Hills, Scotland
- OS grid: NG951611
- Topo map: OS Landranger 19

Listed summits of Beinn Eighe
Name	Grid ref	Height	Status
Ruadh-stac Mòr	NG951611	1,010 m (3,314 ft)	Marilyn, Munro
Spidean Coire nan Clach	NG966597	993 m (3,258 ft)	Munro, Marilyn
Sail Mhòr	NG938605	980 m (3,215 ft)	Munro Top, Murdo
Còinneach Mhòr	NG944600	976 m (3,202 ft)	Munro Top, Murdo
Sgùrr Bàn	NG974600	970 m (3,182 ft)	Munro Top, Murdo
Sgùrr nan Fhir Duibhe	NG981600	963 m (3,159 ft)	Munro Top, Murdo
Creag Dhubh	NG983604	930 m (3,051 ft)	SubMurdo
Creag Dhubh North Top	NG985607	909 m (2,982 ft)	deleted Munro Top
Ruadh-stac Beag	NG972613	896 m (2,940 ft)	Corbett, Marilyn

Beinn Eighe (Scottish Gaelic for 'file mountain') is a mountain massif in the Torridon area of Wester Ross in the Northwest Highlands of Scotland. Lying south of Loch Maree, it forms a long ridge with many spurs and summits, two of which are classified as Munros: Ruadh-stac Mòr at 1,010 m (3,314 ft) and Spidean Coire nan Clach at 993 m (3,258 ft). Unlike most other hills in the area it has a cap of Cambrian basal quartzite which gives the peaks of Beinn Eighe a distinctive light colour. Its complex topography has made it popular with both hillwalkers and climbers and the national nature reserve on its northern side makes it an accessible mountain for all visitors.

== Geography ==
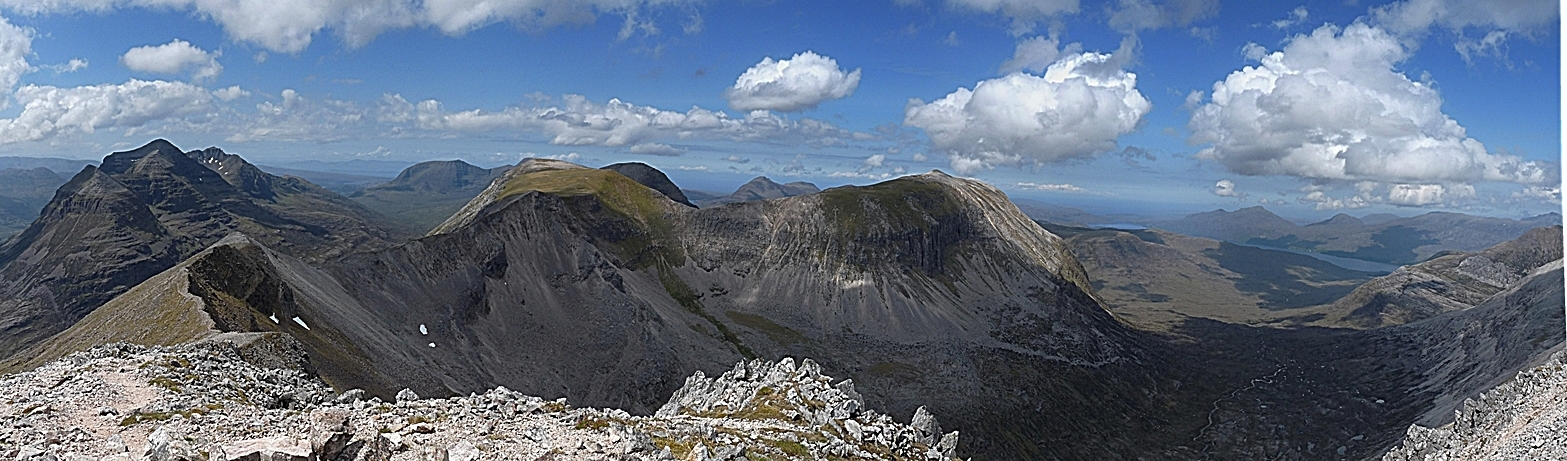
View of Ruadh-stac Mòr and the western part of Beinn Eighe

Located between Loch Maree and Glen Torridon on the west coast of Scotland, Beinn Eighe is a complex mountain. The main ridge runs on a line extending from close to the village of Kinlochewe in the north-east to the narrow glen of the Coire Dubh Mòr, which separates it from the neighbouring mountain of Liathach to the south-west. The slopes into Glen Torridon on the south side are steep with few features and are covered in white quartzite screes. On the north side are four large corries between which are spurs extending out from the main ridge. The southern and eastern sides of the mountain are flanked by the A896 and A832 roads, however the area to the northwest is largely unpopulated, comprising the mountainous landscape of the Torridon Hills and the Flowerdale Forest.

The eastern half of Beinn Eighe is owned by NatureScot, who manage it as a national nature reserve, whilst the rest of the southern side is owned by the National Trust for Scotland: this area is also managed as part of the reserve. The remaining northwestern part of Beinn Eighe lies within the Grudie & Talladale Estate.

Two of Beinn Eighe's summits are classified as Munros. The highest point Beinn Eighe, Ruadh-stac Mòr ('Big Red Stack' in Scottish Gaelic), lies on one of the spurs off the main ridge and stands at a height of 1,010 m (3,314 ft). Spidean Coire nan Clach ('Peak of the Corrie of Stones' in Scottish Gaelic), which was added to the list of Munros in 1997 to become the second Munro on Beinn Eighe, is the highest point on the main ridge itself. It stands at a height of 993 m (3,258 ft) and commands an extensive view over both Glen Torridon and the rest of the Beinn Eighe massif. Ruadh-stac Beag (896 m (2,940 ft)), which lies on a spur from the main ridge east of Ruadh-stac Mòr, has sufficient relative height to be classified as a Corbett.

One of the most famous features of Beinn Eighe is the corrie of Coire Mhic Fhearchair, often simply known as the "Triple Buttress Corrie" after the three large rock features which dominate the view from the north. There are many rock climbs on the buttresses and hillwalkers can access the tops of the buttresses from the head of the corrie.

== Geology ==
In common with much of the Northwest Highlands, the underlying rocks of the area are composed of Lewisian gneiss, a very ancient rock type. The younger Precambrian Torridonian Sandstone, which sits on top of the gneiss, forms the bulk of all of the Torridon Hills, including Beinn Eighe, and was formed around 800 million years ago from the sediment of rivers that flowed across the landscape of the gneiss. Beinn Eighe is however unusual amongst the Torridon Hills in that the summit ridge is composed of white-coloured Cambrian basal quartzite. This is a very hard but brittle rock, that was laid down around 540 million years ago as pure white sands during a period when the area was flooded by warm tropical seas. The quartzite gives Beinn Eighe its familiar light coloured summits, which form a notable contrast to the other peaks in the area, and can appear similar to a covering of snow on the mountain. Within the Cambrian rocks a distinct rock layer, known as the Fucoid Beds, has been identified. The fossils found in the Fucoid Beds are very different to those from rocks of a similar age found in England, a fact that was crucial in establishing that during the Cambrian period the two land masses were separated by ocean. These fossils, which include trilobites, and worm burrows, are some of the oldest fossils to be found in Scotland. The fossil of one creature identified in the rocks of Beinn Eighe, Olenellus armatus, has not been found at any other location.

The area was heavily sculpted by glaciers during successive ice ages.

== Flora and fauna ==
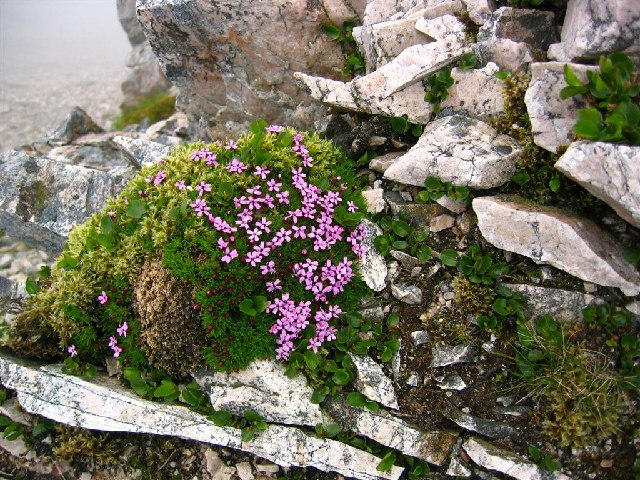
Moss Campion at Sgùrr Ban

Many rare plants, including two variants of dwarf shrub heath and a western variant of moss heath, are to be found at Beinn Eighe. In total 680 different species of plants have been identified, including the greatest variety of oceanic mosses and liverworts of any single site in Britain. The summit plateau is the only location in Britain at which the liverwort Herbertus borealis (northern prongwort) has been found; whilst Beinn Eighe is also the most northerly known global location at which the moss species Daltonia splachnoides has been identified. Other rare plant species found include tufted saxifrage and brook saxifrage.

In total 235 ha of the Beinn Eighe National Nature Reserve are covered in ancient woodlands, which grows in areas between 12 and 300 metres above sea level, and the woodland at Coille na Glas Leitir on the northern side of the mountain is the largest fragment of ancient Caledonian pinewood remaining in north-west Scotland. The Scots pine in this area show genetic differences to those in eastern parts of Scotland, and are more similar to those growing in southern Europe. It is thought that this results from the fact that western Scotland became ice-free first at the end of the last ice-age, allowing pine to move north along the western fringe of Europe. Pines reached Eastern Scotland from more northerly areas during a later period, as the ice sheets retreated further. In March 2019 a "genetic reserve" was established at Beinn Eighe as part of the European Forest Genetic Resources Programme in order to coordinate investigation and protection of the unique DNA fingerprint of the area's pines.

Bird species observed at Beinn Eighe include golden eagles, Scottish crossbills, bramblings, ring ouzels, golden plovers, skylarks, redwings and divers. The reserve is home to mammal species including Scottish red deer, mountain hare and pine marten, although the Scottish wildcat has not been observed for many years. Eurasian otters breed along the shores of Loch Maree, and have been sighted on burns and lochans up to 400 m above sea level.

== Ascents ==
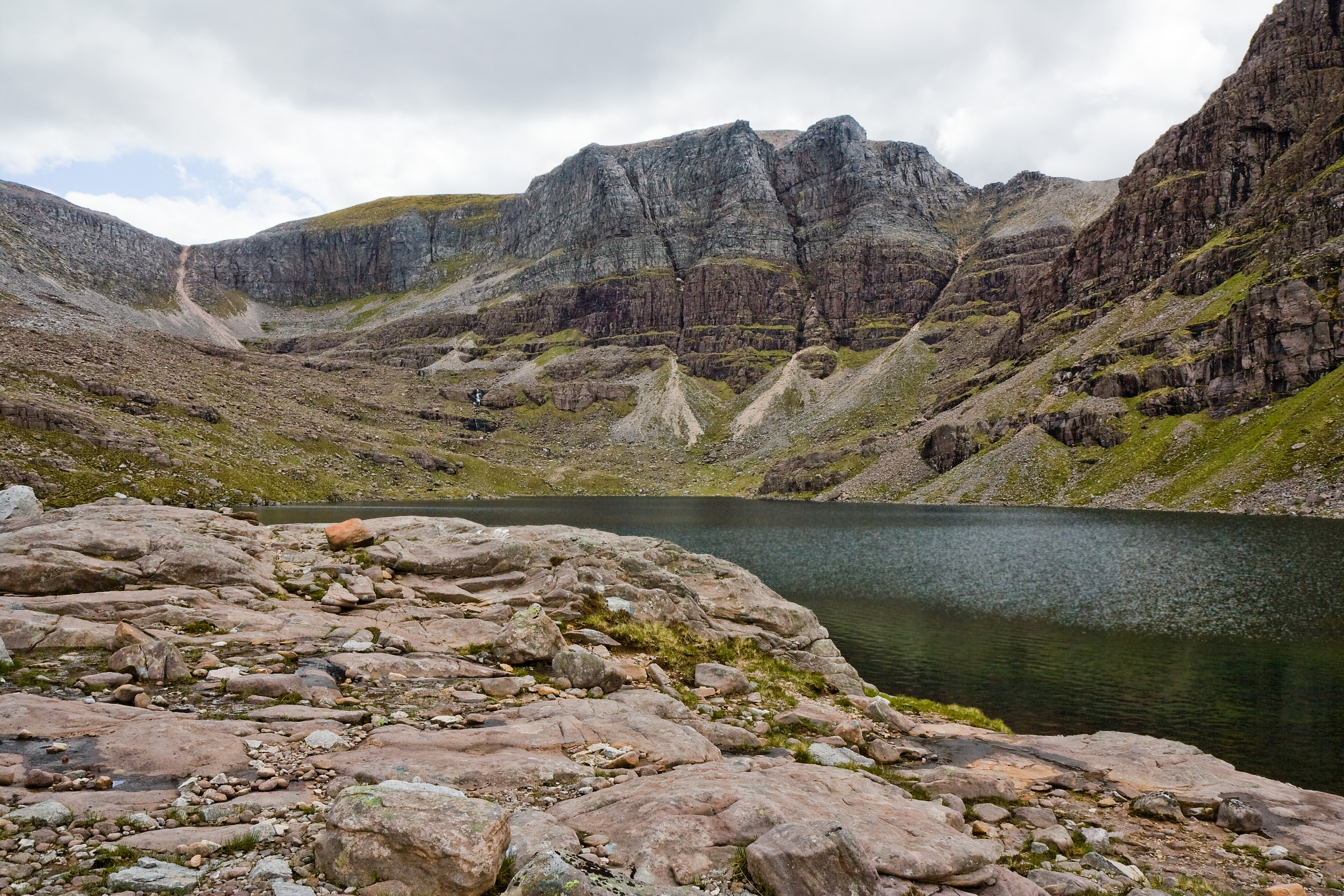
The triple buttresses of Coire Mhic Fhearchair.

Beinn Eighe's complex topography offers both hillwalkers and climbers a wide variety of routes, climbs and traverses. For the hillwalker a popular route is the western traverse which includes both of the Munro summits and Coire Mhic Fhearchair. A full traverse of Beinn Eighe includes navigating a series of pinnacles known as the Black Carls, which provide good scrambling and are located at the eastern end of the main ridge. Approached from the east the Black Carls are a popular climb in their own right.

The cartographer Timothy Pont visited the Loch Maree area when producing his series of maps of Scotland in the late sixteenth century, including a sketch of Coire Mhic Fhearchair on his maps, however there is little evidence of any recorded visits to the summits of Beinn Eighe prior to the nineteenth century. The earliest recorded ascent appears to have been during surveying of the boundary between the Gairloch and Torridon Estates, which surveyor George Campbell Smith was required to determine and delineate in 1851.

== Air crash ==
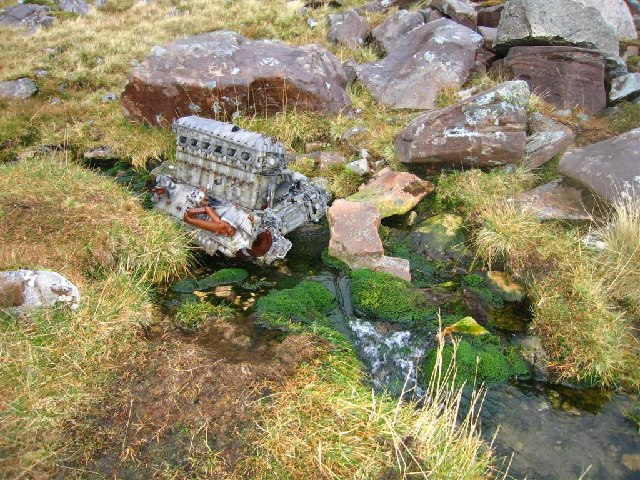
Wreckage from Avro Lancaster TX264 in Coire Mhic Fhearchair in 2005

The Triple Buttress Corrie was the scene of an aviation tragedy on the night of 13–14 March 1951. An Avro Lancaster crashed about 5 m below the crest of the summit ridge in a gully now known as Fuselage Gulley (or Far West Gulley) above Loch Coire Mhic Fhearchair. The aircraft, which was part of 120 Squadron, had taken off from RAF Kinloss around 6 pm for a maritime reconnaissance mission in the vicinity of Rockall and the Faroe Isles, and was due back at around 2:30 am. During the return journey the weather conditions were poor, with freezing temperatures and a strong north-easterly wind.

Although experienced local mountaineers offered to assist, the RAF initially determined that the search would be handled by their own search teams. It was not until 16 March (two days after the crash) that the location of the crash was identified, from an Airspeed Oxford taking part in the search. The search had been directed to the Beinn Eighe area as a result of reports from local witnesses, who had seen a red flash over the mountain. The RAF rescue teams arrived at the foot of the mountain on 17 March but despite several attempts were unable to reach the crash site due to the mountainous terrain and adverse winter weather conditions. Finally, two Royal Marine commandos reached the crash site. It was not until nearly 6 months after the incident that the bodies of the crew were finally recovered.

The length of time taken to complete the recovery operation was a key factor in the introduction of formal training courses for the RAF Mountain Rescue Teams; prior to this MRS teams were neither adequately trained nor equipped to undertake recovery operations in such extreme mountainous areas. It also led to the creation of an Air Ministry post of Inspector of Land Rescue (ILR). Similarly, the involvement of local gamekeepers and gillies in removing the bodies was instrumental in the formation of the Kinlochewe and Torridon Mountain Rescue Team.

The eight crew members who died in the incident were:

- Fl/Lt Harry Smith Reid DFC (29), Pilot, RAF.
- Sgt Ralph Clucas (23), Co-Pilot, RAF.
- Flt Lt Robert Strong (27), Navigator, RAF.
- Fl/Lt Peter Tennison (26), Air Signals, RAF.
- Sgt James Naismith (28), Air Signals, RAF.
- Sgt Wilfred D Beck (19), Air Signals, RAF.
- Sgt James W Bell (25), Air Signals, RAF.
- Sgt George Farquhar (29), Flight Engineer, RAF.

== Beinn Eighe National Nature Reserve ==
Beinn Eighe National Nature Reserve
- IUCN category II (national park)
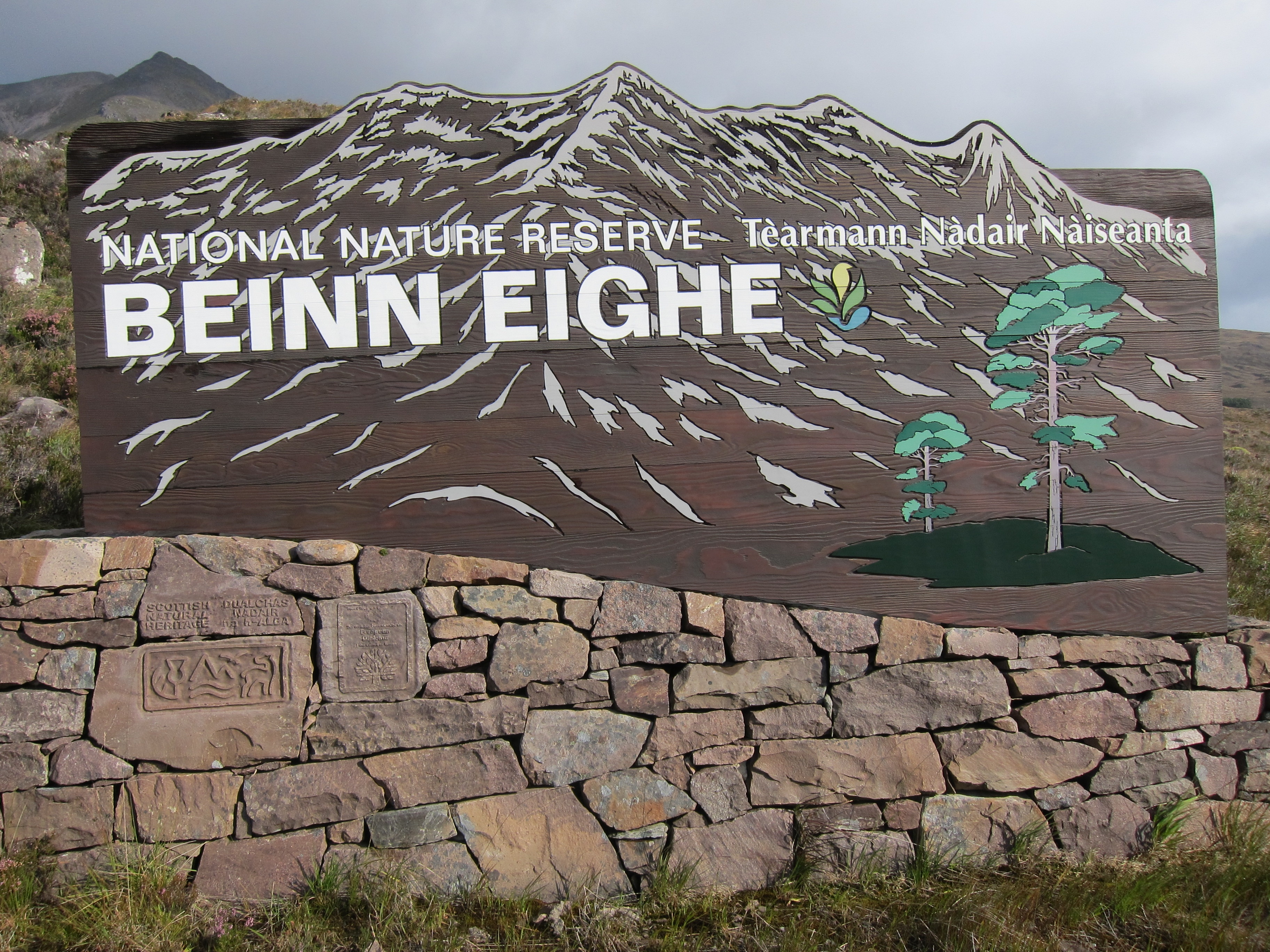
- Beinn Eighe National Nature Reserve signage

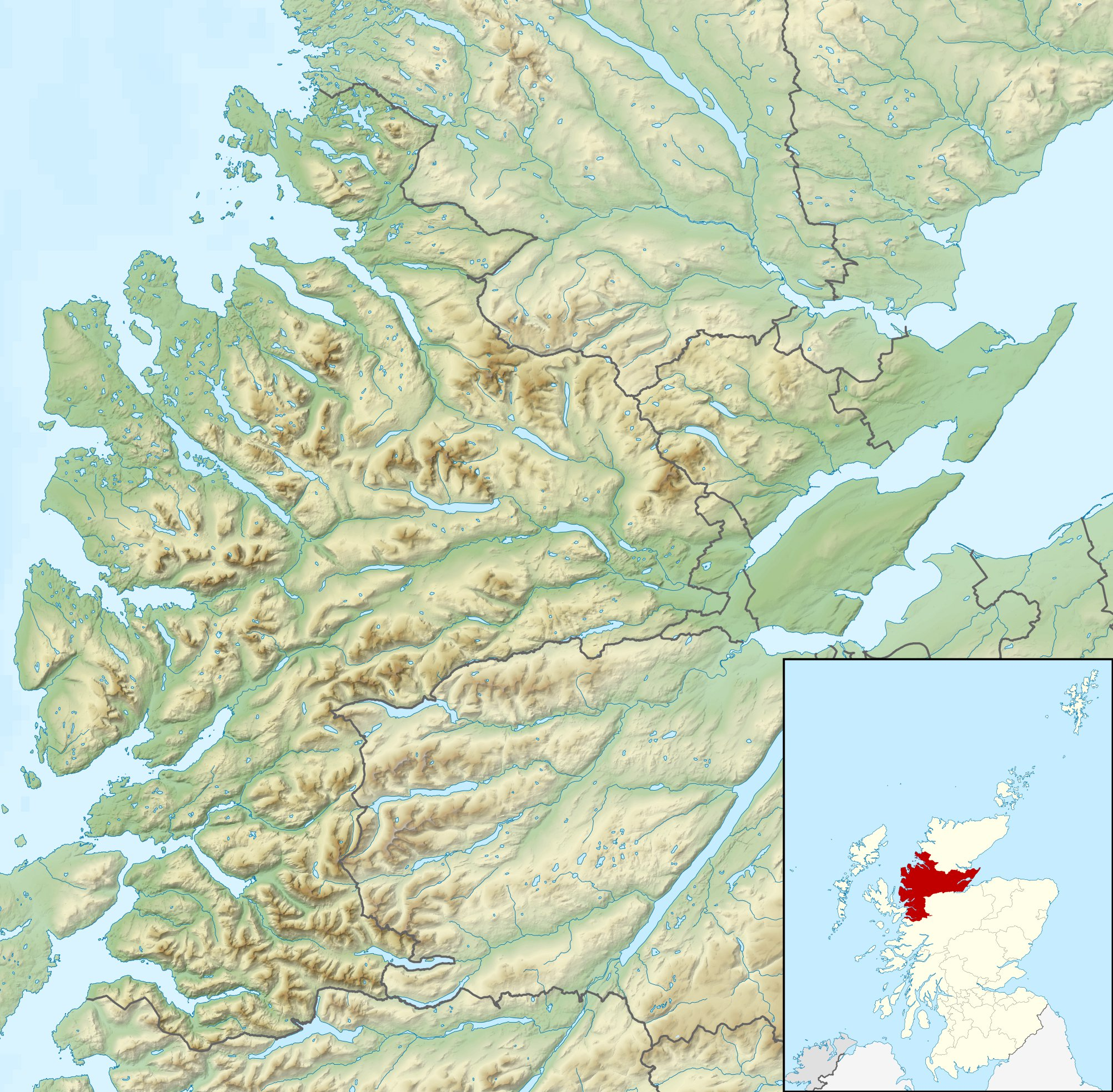
- Location within Ross and Cromarty
- Location: Wester Ross, Scotland
- Coordinates: 57.614°N 5.317°W
- Area: 4758 ha
- Established: 1951
- Governing body: NatureScot
- Website: Beinn Eighe and Loch Maree Islands National Nature Reserve

The Beinn Eighe National Nature Reserve covers 4758 hectares, including open moorland, woodland and bogs. It was established in 1951 by Dr John Berry in his role as Director of Nature Conservancy in Scotland, and was the first such area in Great Britain. In 2014 the Beinn Eighe NNR was merged with the neighbouring Loch Maree Islands NNR, which covers over 60 islands in Loch Maree to be managed as a single Beinn Eighe and Loch Maree Islands NNR, although the two reserves are still formally designated separately. Most of the Beinn Eighe reserve is owned by NatureScot, although an area of 577 ha on the western side belongs to the National Trust for Scotland. NatureScot provides a visitor centre at Aultroy, just over a kilometre northwest of Kinlochewe. From the visitor centre there are several marked trails through woodland on the lower slopes of Beinn Eighe, as well as picnic areas and viewpoints. Further to west, NatureScot have constructed two further routes: the 1.5 km-long Woodland Trail passes through the pinewood of the Coille na Glas Leitir, whilst the 6.5 km-long Mountain Trail climbs to the "Conservation Cairn" at c. 550 m (1,804 ft) which offers extensive views of the surrounding landscape including Loch Maree and the nearby mountain Slioch. NatureScot also provides a field station with full laboratory facilities for up to fourteen people which is used by scientists and researchers to co-ordinate field data recording and as a base for undergraduate fieldwork. A tree nursery lies alongside the field station; trees are raised from local stock for planting on the reserve in order to expand the amount of woodland.

The Beinn Eighe and Loch Maree Islands NNR forms part of the UNESCO Wester Ross Biosphere reserve, and also lies within the Wester Ross national scenic area. The NNR is classified as a Category II protected area by the International Union for Conservation of Nature. The reserve is a Site of Special Scientific Interest (SSSI), and forms part of the Loch Maree Complex Special Area of Conservation (SAC), a European site of international significance, with the Caledonian pinewood, the rich mosaic of upland habitats and the otter population all forming part of the qualifying interests of the SAC designation. The Loch Maree Islands portion of the reserve also forms part of the Loch Maree Special Protection Area (SPA), which hosts the single most important breeding population of black-throated diver in Britain.
