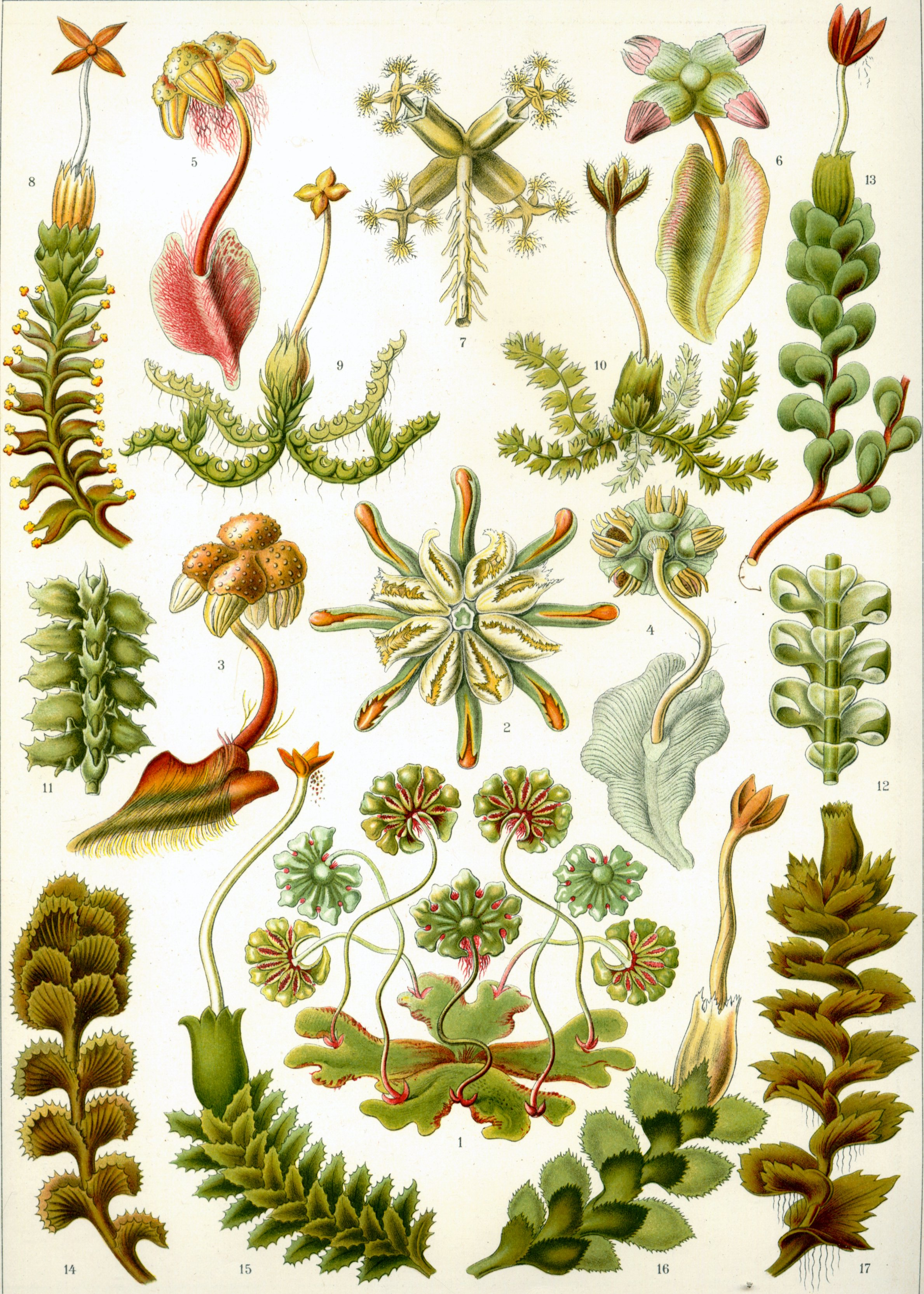
- Assortment of Hepaticae, including No. 6 Fimbriaria sanguinea (Lindenberg) = Schisma sanguineum (Mont.)

Scientific classification
- Kingdom: Plantae
- Division: Marchantiophyta
- Class: Jungermanniopsida
- Order: Jungermanniales
- Suborder: Lophocoleineae
- Family: Herbertaceae; Müll.Frib. ex Fulford & Hatcher, 1958

= Herbertaceae =

Family of liverworts

Herbertaceae is a family of liverworts. The family consists of the genera Herbertus, Schisma and Triandrophyllum. The genus Herpocladium Mitten, 1873 was later merged into the genus Herbertus.

== Genera ==
As accepted by GBIF;

- Herbertus Gray (107 species)
- Schisma Dumort. (15 species)
- Triandrophyllum Fulford & Hatch. (10)
