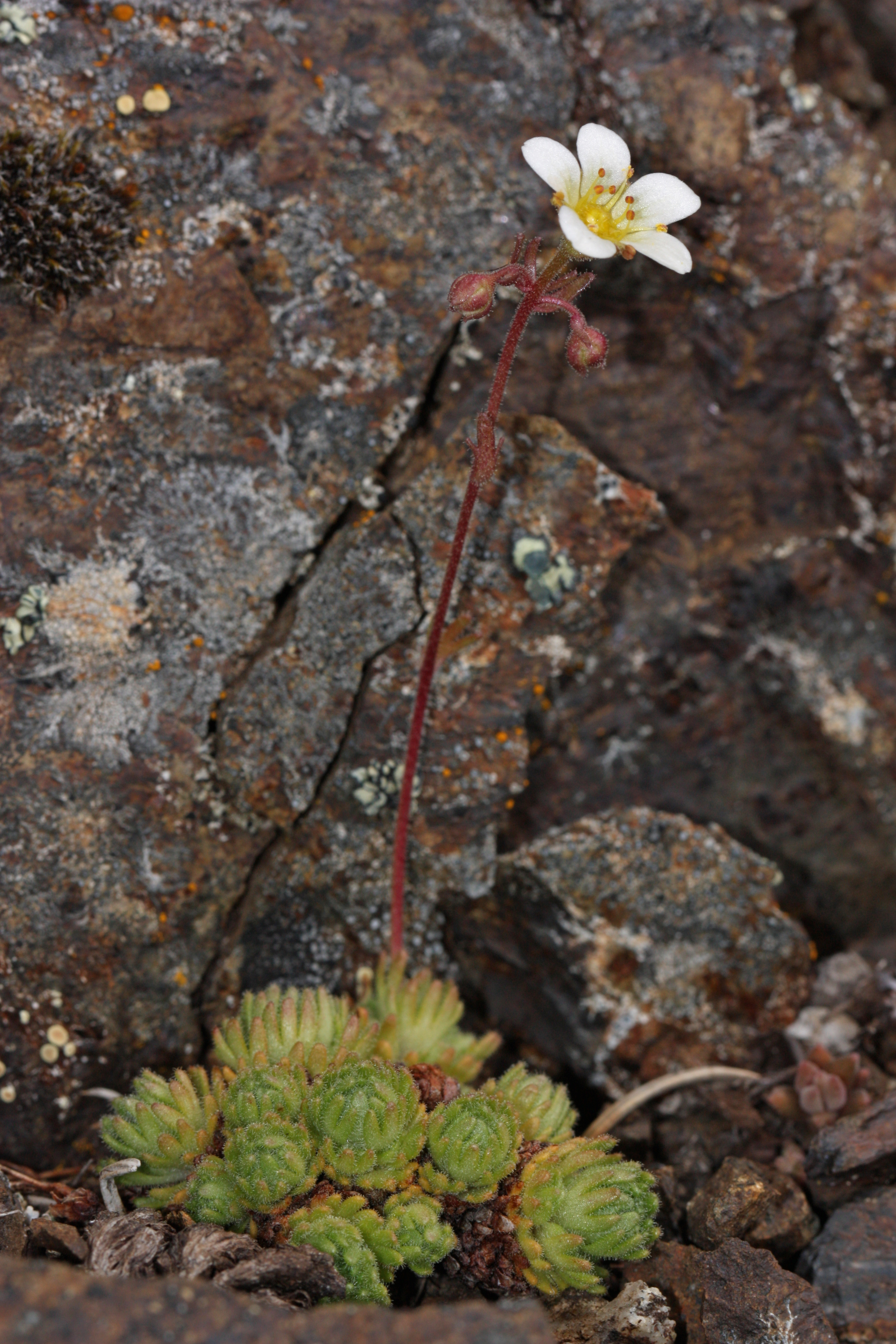

Scientific classification
- Kingdom: Plantae
- Clade: Tracheophytes
- Clade: Angiosperms
- Clade: Eudicots
- Order: Saxifragales
- Family: Saxifragaceae
- Genus: Saxifraga
- Species: S. cespitosa

Binomial name
- Saxifraga cespitosa L.

Synonyms
- Saxifraga caespitosa (orth. var.)

= Saxifraga cespitosa =

Species of flowering plant

Saxifraga cespitosa, the tufted alpine saxifrage or tufted saxifrage, is a species of flowering plant common to many arctic heights. It appears further south in mountainous areas of the Alps, Norway, Scotland, Wales, Iceland, Siberia, western North America and Greenland.

Densely tufted from a stout taproot, the plant has very short stems with withered, dead leaves at the base. The leaves have three to five lobes; both leaves and calyx exhibit trichomes in the form of glandular hair. Flowering stems range from 5–10 cm, with one or two flowers per stem. Its petals are white, twice the length of the calyx lobes. Smaller specimens, with shorter stems and smaller, yellowish-greenish petals (with uniflorous variants), are rather frequent.

The tufted saxifrage grows on ledges and gravelly places.

It became a protected species in the UK in 1975 under the Conservation of Wild Creatures and Wild Plants Act.

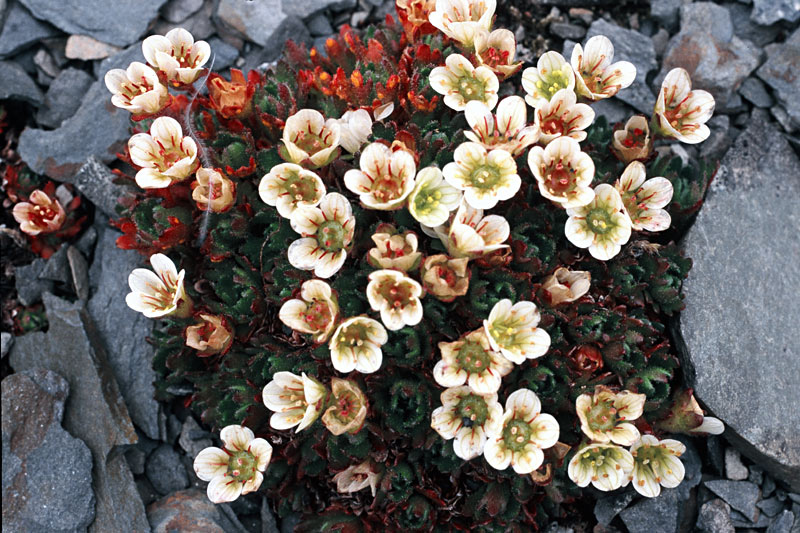
Tufted saxifrage

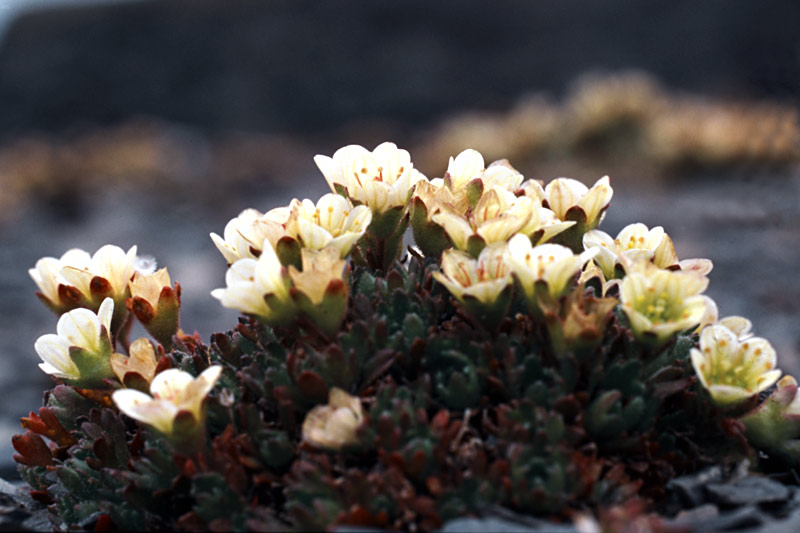
Tufted saxifrage

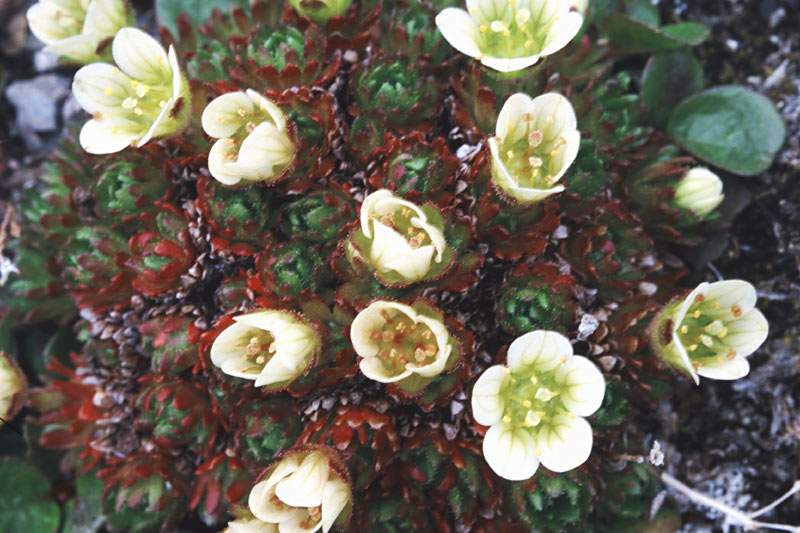
Tufted saxifrage

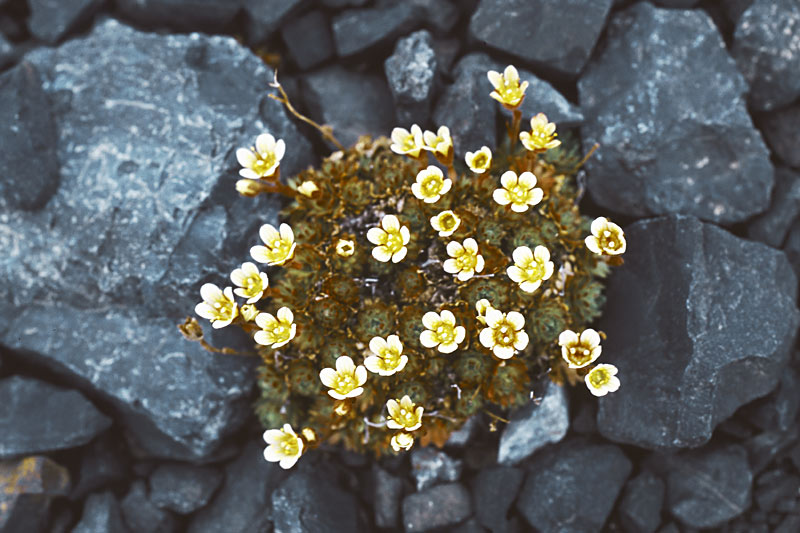
Tufted saxifrage

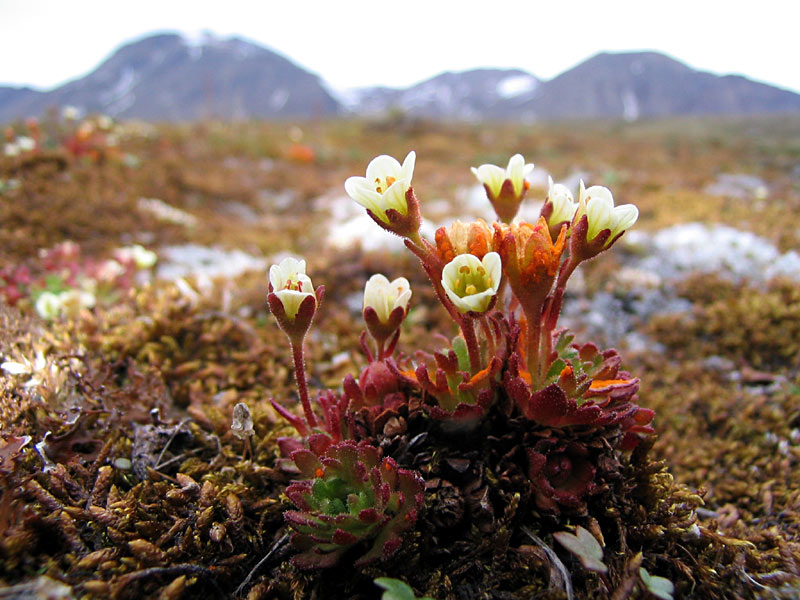
Smaller yellowish var.

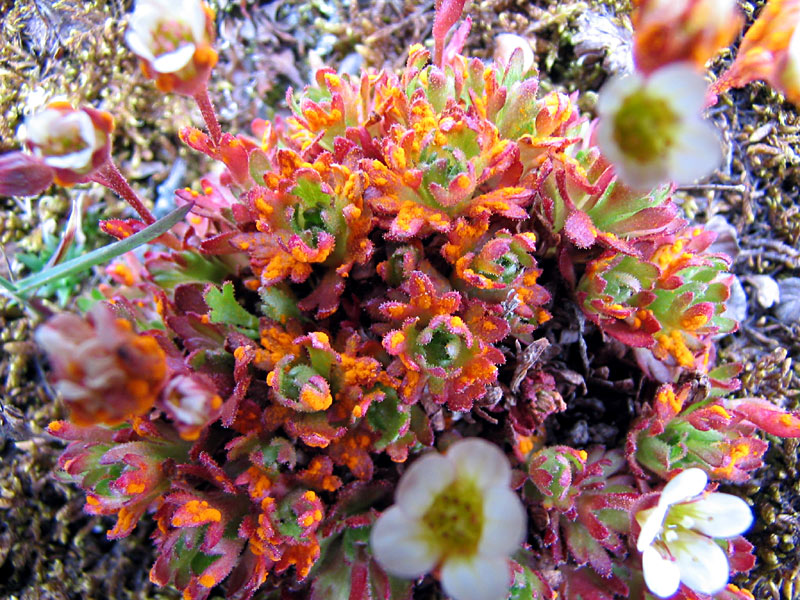
Smaller yellowish var.

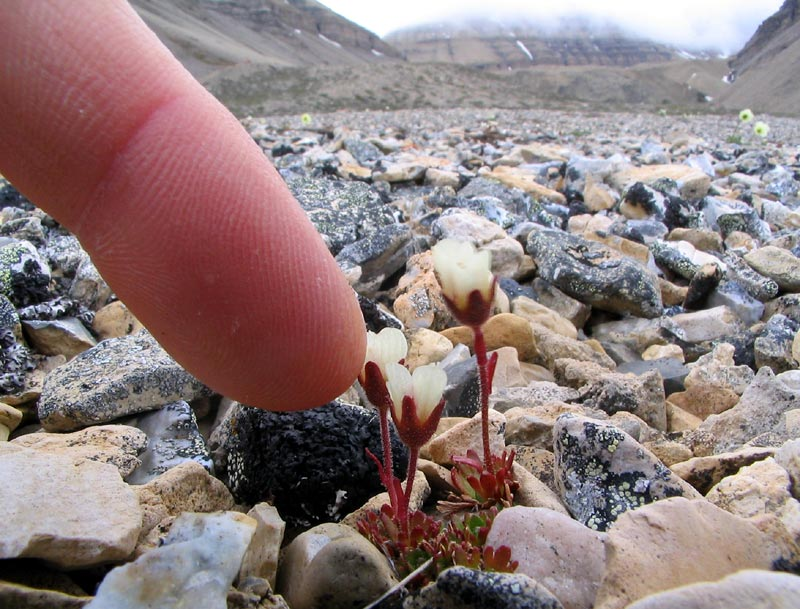
Smaller var.
