= Northwest Highlands =

Located in the northern third of Scotland

Coordinates: 57°30′N 5°0′W

The Northwest Highlands are located in the northern third of Scotland that is separated from the Grampian Mountains by the Great Glen (Glen More). The region comprises Wester Ross, Assynt, Sutherland and part of Caithness. The Caledonian Canal, which extends from Loch Linnhe in the south-west, via Loch Ness to the Moray Firth in the north-east splits this area from the rest of the country. The city of Inverness and the town of Fort William serve as gateways to the region from the south.

== Geology ==
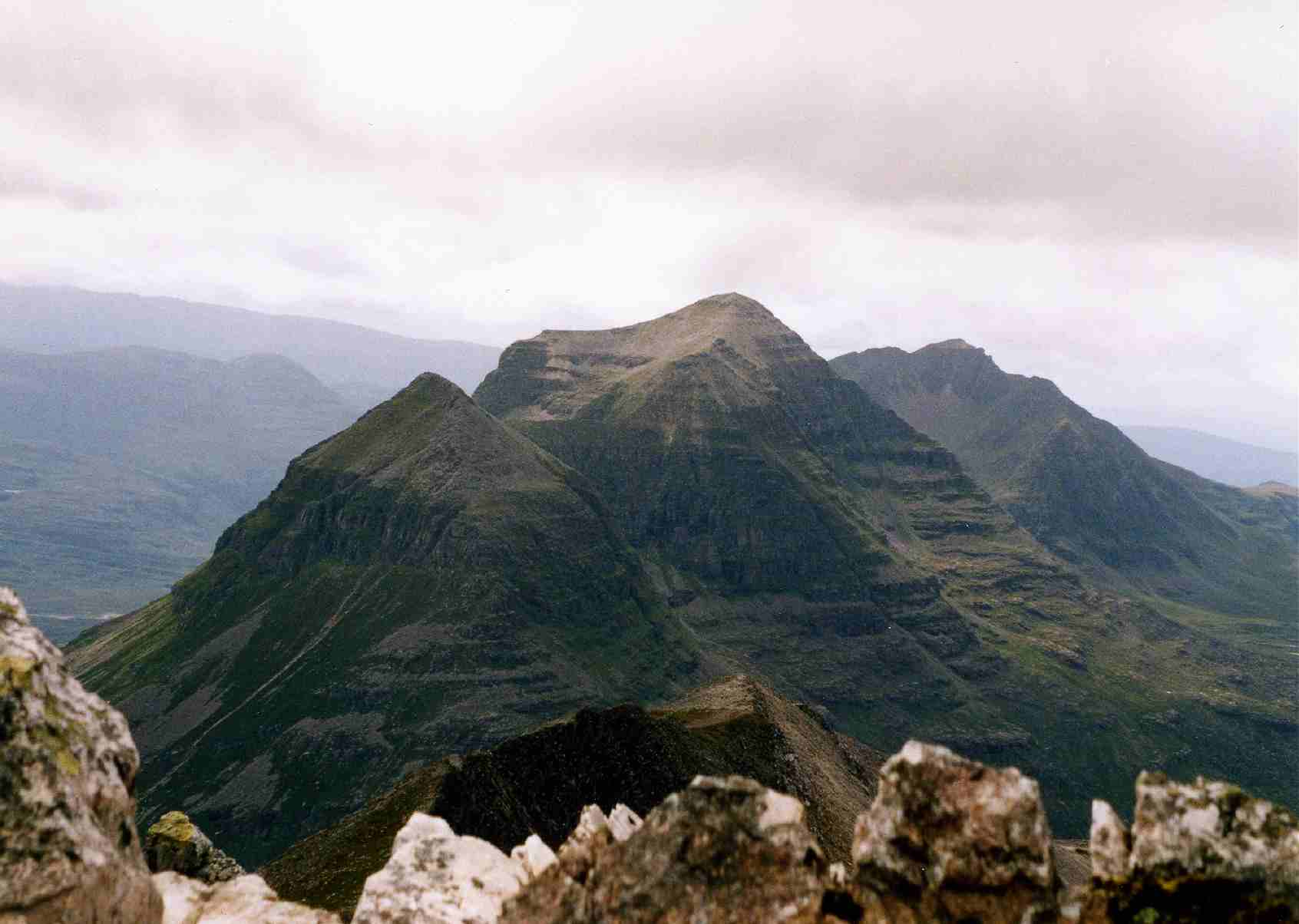
Liathach seen from Beinn Eighe. With the Munro "Top" of Stuc a' Choire Dhuibh Bhig (915 metres) in the foreground and the two Munro summits in the background.

The geology of the Highlands is complex. Along the western coastal margin it is characterised by Lewisian gneiss, the oldest rock in Scotland. Liathach, Beinn Alligin, Suilven, Cùl Mòr, Cùl Beag, and Quinag are just some of the impressive rock islands of the significantly younger rich brown-coloured Torridonian sandstone which rests on the gneiss. Some of the peaks, such as Beinn Eighe and Canisp, are topped with later light grey or white Cambrian quartzite. Cambro-Ordovician limestone is also to be found in a narrow outcrop between Durness and Skye. The larger part of the region is formed from rocks of the Moine succession much of which is metamorphosed sandstones (psammites) and schist. These have over-ridden the gneiss and the Cambrian and Ordovician rocks of the northwest margin along the Moine Thrust Belt. The geological understanding of thrust faulting slowly developed in the 19th century in what became known as the "Highlands Controversy".

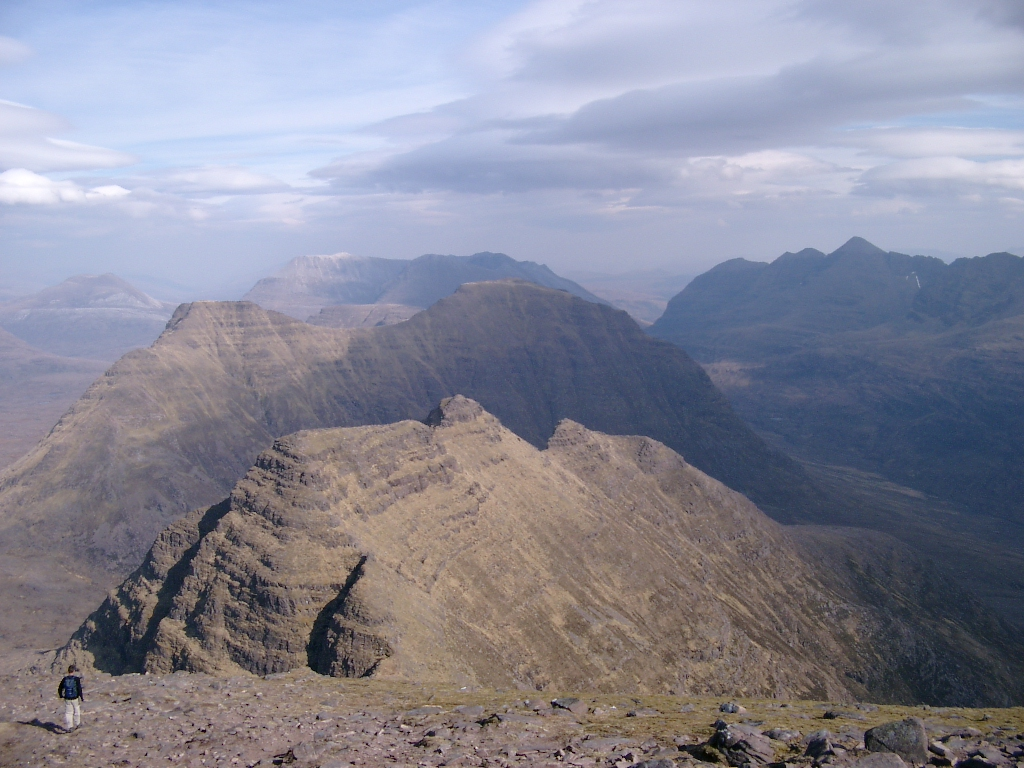
View east from Sgurr Mhòr over the "Horns" of Beinn Alligin

.

== Climate ==
Considering its high northerly latitude of about 57 to 58 degrees north and the mountainous terrain, the climate is mild, moderated by the warming influence of the North Atlantic Drift which is a powerful warm western boundary current within the Atlantic Ocean that extends the Gulf Stream northeastward. At low elevations and near the coast the climate is maritime. The summers are mild and wet with average daytime highs under 17 °C, or 62.6 °F. The winters are cool at low elevation with average night-time lows below 0 °C, or 32 °F, but become colder and snowier inland and at higher elevations with the highest tops exhibiting a tundra climate. The Northwest Highlands are, on average, not as cold as the higher, snowier Cairngorm mountains which lie to the southeast. However, on 30 December 1995, the UK's lowest temperature was recorded at Altnaharra, at −27.2 °C (−17.0 °F). This matched a similar recording at Braemar in the Grampians on 11 February 1895 and on 10 January 1982. Snow does not usually lie for significant periods at the coast or at low elevations but may lie for up to 105 days per year, persisting into the summer months, at the highest elevations. Naturally, the area would be a vast birch, pine and montane shrub forest, such as those surviving in Glen Affric.

== Geography ==
The region has steep, glacier-carved mountains, glens and interspersed plains. Many islands (which also vary widely in geography) lie off the coast. Elevations of around 750 metres (2,500 feet) or over are common, as are mountains exceeding 3,000 feet or 914 m (Munros). The highest point is the summit of Càrn Eige at an elevation of 1,183 metres (3,881 feet) above sea level. By comparison, across the Great Glen to the south, the Grampians includes Ben Nevis which is highest point in the British Isles at 1,345 metres.

The aurora borealis is sometimes visible on winter nights, especially at the climax of the 11-year cycle. Bordering the region to the northeast is the lowland area of Caithness. There are relatively few roads, and many are single lane (with passing places). The region has a very low population density. Significant settlements are Kyle of Lochalsh, Mallaig, Dingwall, Dornoch, and Ullapool. The city of Inverness, known as the "Capital of the Highlands", on the eastern margin of the Northwest Highlands, is by far the largest settlement in the region and is the administrative centre for the Highland Council area.

== List of places in the Northwest Highlands ==
- Applecross
- Lochinver
- Torridon
- Shieldaig
- Kishorn

=== Towns and villages ===
- Inverness
- Beauly
- Dingwall
- Dornoch
- Fort Augustus
- Fort William
- Lairg
- Mallaig
- Muir of Ord
- Ullapool

=== Regions and mountain ranges ===
- Achnashellach Forest
- Applecross
- Assynt
- Coigach
- Dundonnell and Fisherfield Forest
- Fannichs
- Inverpolly
- Kintail
- Knoydart
- Skye
- Torridon Hills

=== Glens and lochs ===
- Glen Kingie
- Glen Affric
- Glenmoriston
- Glen Shiel
- Loch Broom
- Loch Cluanie
- Loch Morar
- Loch Shiel
- Loch Torridon
- Loch Maree
- Loch Ness

== See also ==
- Scottish Highlands
- Torridonian sandstone

== Bibliography ==
- Murray, W.H. (1977). The Companion Guide to the West Highlands of Scotland. London: William Collins Sons & Co. Ltd. ISBN 0 00 216813 8.
