= Liathach =

Mountain in Highland, Scotland

Coordinates: 57.564329°N 5.462121°W

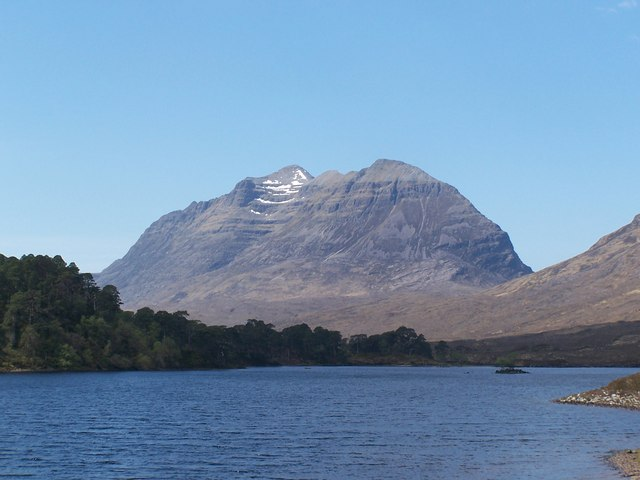
- Liathach from the east

Highest point
- Elevation: 1,055 m (3,461 ft)
- Prominence: 957 m (3,140 ft); Ranked 8th in British Isles
- Parent peak: Càrn Eige
- Listing: Marilyn, Munro

Naming
- English translation: the Grey one
- Language of name: Gaelic
- Pronunciation: Scottish Gaelic: [ˈs̪pitʲan ə ˈxɔɾʲə ˈʎeː]

Geography
- Location: Torridon, Scotland
- Parent range: Northwest Highlands
- OS grid: NG929579
- Topo map: OS Landranger 25

Liathach (Scottish Gaelic for 'the hoary place'; pronounced [ˈʎiəhəx]) (Liaghaich [ˈʎiəɣɪç] in the local Torridon Gaelic dialect) is a mountain in the Torridon Hills, in the Northwest Highlands of Scotland. It stands between Loch Torridon and the neighbouring mountain Beinn Eighe. The mountain is a ridge running east–west, with several peaks, and its upper half is made up of many steep rocky terraces. The highest peak is the Munro of Spidean a' Choire Lèith ('peak of the grey corrie') at 1,055 metres (3,461 ft) high. The other Munro peak is Mullach an Rathain at 1,024 metres (3,360 ft) high.

== Geology ==
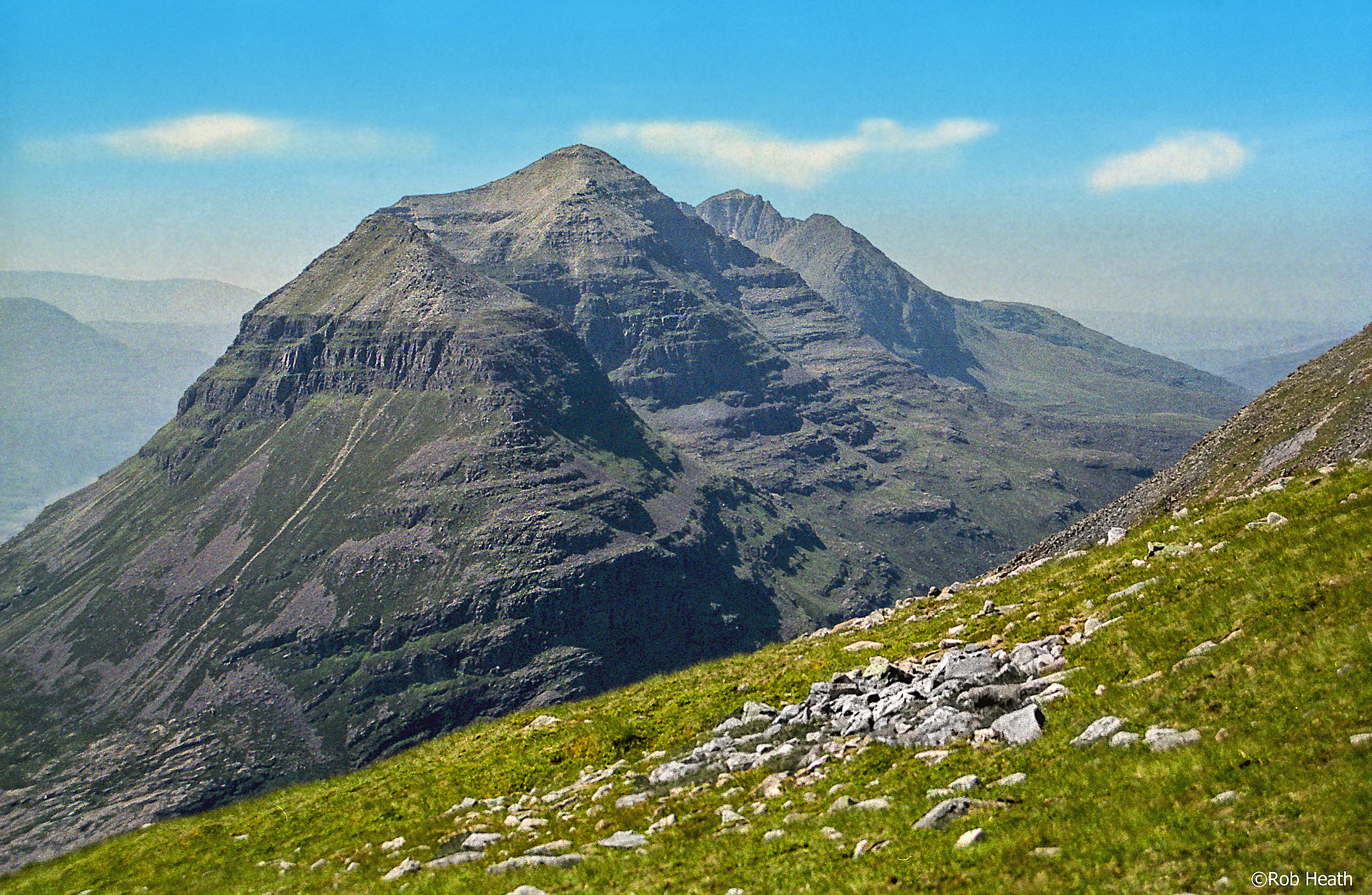
The rocky terraces of Liathach seen from Beinn Eighe

The mountain is composed of Torridonian sandstone which forms massive near-horizontal strata. They form the numerous terraces that are obvious from afar. The rocks are mainly red and chocolate sandstones, arkoses, flagstones and shales with coarse conglomerates locally at the base. Some of the materials of these rocks were derived from the underlying Lewisian gneiss, upon the uneven surface of which they rest, but the bulk of the material was obtained from rocks that are nowhere now exposed. Upon this ancient denuded land surface the Torridonian strata rest horizontally or with gentle inclination. Some of the peaks, such as Beinn Eighe, are capped with white quartzite, giving them a distinctive appearance when seen from afar. Some of the quartzite contains fossilized worm burrows and is known as pipe rock. It is about 500 million years old. The Torridon landscape is itself highly denuded by glacial and alluvial action, and represents the remnants of an ancient peneplain.

== Climbing ==
Listed summits of Liathach
Name	Grid ref	Height	Status
Mullach an Rathain	NG912577	1023.8 m (3,359 ft)	Marilyn, Munro
Meall Dearg	NG913579	955 m (3133 ft)	Munro Top
Stob a' Choire Liath Mhòr	NG932581	983 m (3225 ft)	Munro Top
Am Fasarinen	NG923574	927 m (3041 ft)	Munro Top
Stùc a' Choire Dhuibh Bhig	NG942582	915 m (3002 ft)	Munro Top

Liathach has four listed "Tops" in the Munro Tables, Meall Dearg at 3,133 feet (955 metres) stands off the main ridge at the end of the Northern Pinnacles which run north from Mullach an Rathain. The route along the Northern Pinnacles is considered a rock climb, although another route to the top from Coire na Caime only involves a short steep scramble on the final 50 m to gain the ridge. Irvine Butterfield considers Meall Dearg "The most difficult top in the British Isles challenged only by the Inaccessible Pinnacle of Sgùrr Dearg". The Northern Pinnacles were first climbed in 1894 by Hinxman, Rennie and Douglas.

Climbing the mountain including both of the above peaks is a challenging expedition; the intervening ridge is for the most part a series of rocky pinnacles known as Am Fasarinen (The Teeth), which reaches a height of 927 metres at the western end and is considered a Munro "top". There are few places on the ridge for descent, so once committed, the walker has little choice but to complete the entire ridge walk. The pinnacles can however be avoided by means of a narrow path that traverses the ridge on the south side. The path is very exposed, and there is much erosion at points where it crosses any of a series of gullies. In winter the traverse of Liathach becomes an even more serious expedition.
