= Torridon (band) =

Scottish folk rock band

- Genres: Folk rock
- Label: Daddy records
- Members: Kenny Smith; Michael MacMillan; Kenny Lyall; Paul 'Pel' Elliott; Glyn Evans
- Website: http://www.torridonlive.com/

Torridon are a Scottish folk rock band from Ross-shire formed in 2005. The band have played throughout Europe and released their first album, Break The Chains, in 2019.

Songs are jointly written by backing vocalist, and founding member Kenny Smith, and lead vocalist Michael MacMillan.

== History ==
=== Formation ===
Torridon were founded in 2005 by Kenny Smith, the backing vocalist and co-writer who is supported by lead vocalist and co-writer Michael MacMillan.

=== Live performances ===
Torridon have played in Loopallu, Belladrum, Killin, Tiree, Killin, Bute and Mull festivals, at The Ironworks in Inverness, The Lemon Tree in Aberdeen and at Glasgow’s O2 Academy. Outside Scotland, they have played in Ukraine, France, and Italy.

=== Discography ===
==== Break The Chains (2019) ====
Fourteen years after forming, Torridon released their debut album Break The Chains on 20 September 2019. The album deals with themes of mental health and suicide, referring to the lived experiences of band members.

Tracks include Lighthouse, Sweet 16, Highland Girl, Here We Go Again, Drinking Away and No Bills To Pay.

== Musical style ==
They are well known for their energetic live performances and use of bagpipes. Their style was described by as being at the "rock/pop end of the folk-rock spectrum" by Paul Mansfield writing in The Living Tradition, Mansfield also compared their style to that of Runrig, The Saw Doctors, Deacon Blue, and Big Country.
