= Beinn Alligin =

Mountain in Scotland

Coordinates: 57.59082°N 5.572764°W

- Sgùrr Mòr
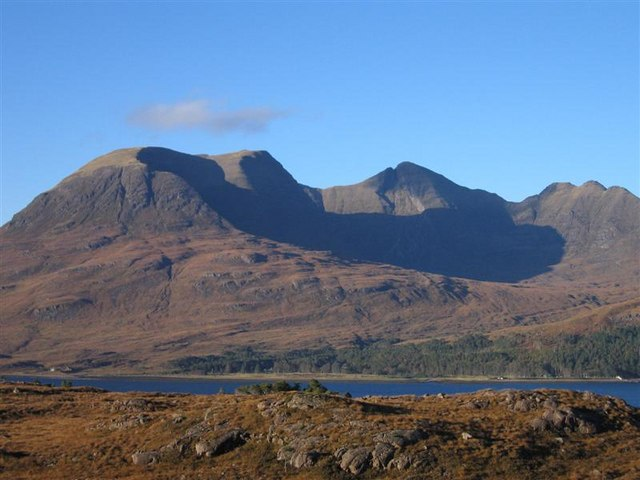
- Beinn Alligin

Highest point
- Elevation: 986 m (3,235 ft)
- Prominence: c. 601 m
- Parent peak: Beinn Eighe
- Listing: Munro, Marilyn

Naming
- Native name: Beinn Àilleagan (Scottish Gaelic)
- English translation: Big Peak
- Pronunciation: English: /ˌbeɪn ˈælɪɡɪn/ bayn AL-ig-in; Scottish Gaelic: [peɲ ˈaːʎakən]

Geography
- Location within Scotland
- Location: Torridon, Scotland
- OS grid: NG865613
- Topo map: OS Landranger 19, 24

Listed summits of Beinn Alligin
Name	Grid ref	Height	Status
Sgùrr Mòr	NG865686	986 m (3,235 ft)	Munro, Marilyn
Tom na Gruagaich	NG859601	922 m (3,025 ft)	Munro, Marilyn
Na Rathanan	NG873613	866 m (2,841 ft)	Corbett Top

Beinn Alligin (Scottish Gaelic: Beinn Àilleagan) is one of the classic mountains of the Torridon region of Scotland, lying to the north of Loch Torridon, in the Highlands. The name Beinn Alligin is from the Scottish Gaelic, meaning Jewelled Hill. The mountain has two peaks of Munro status: Tom na Gruagaich (922 m or 3,025 ft) to the south, and Sgùrr Mòr at 986 metres (3,235 ft) to the north.

One of the most prominent features of Beinn Alligin is a great cleft known as Eag Dhubh na h-Eigheachd (black gash of the wailing) or Leum na Caillich, which cuts into the ridge south of the summit. It is the scar of the most spectacular rockslide or rock avalanche in Britain, which runs out into the corrie of Toll a' Mhadaidh Mor. It occurred around 3750 years ago and is around 3.5 million cubic metres in volume. According to local folklore shepherds on the mountain would hear cries from the gash; those who investigated the source of these cries would inevitably fall to their deaths.

Beinn Alligin lies on the National Trust for Scotland's Torridon Estate, which has been owned by the charity since 1967, and forms part of both a Site of Special Scientific Interest (SSSI) and a Special Area of Conservation (SAC).

== Ascent ==
The usual route of ascent starts from the minor road between Torridon village and Inveralligin, following the route of the Abhainn Coire Mhic Nobuil (a river), before heading up into the corrie of Coir nan Laogh. Steep grassy slopes then lead to the summit of Tom na Gruagaich. The main ridge of Beinn Alligin is then followed round to the north, leading the hillwalker towards Sgùrr Mòr. Below the summit of this peak is a deep gash in the hillside known as Eag Dubh, the black notch, one of Beinn Alligin's most recognisable features.

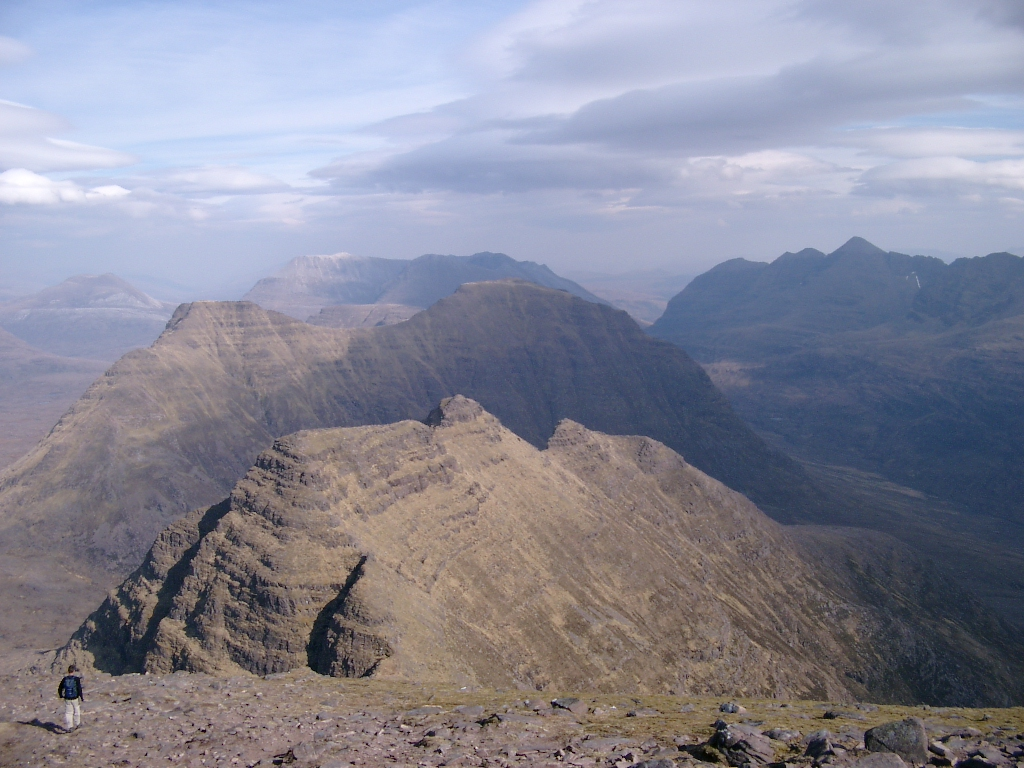
View east from Sgùrr Mòr over the "Horns"

From the summit of Sgùrr Mòr, it is possible to continue along the ridge, now heading in an easterly direction. The ridge at this point becomes much rockier, and a series of pinnacles known as the "Horns of Alligin" (Scottish Gaelic: Na Rathanan) must be negotiated. The horns provide good summer scrambling for those with a head for heights, but in winter they are a much more serious proposition.

An alternative descent, avoiding the horns, can be made by leaving the Beinn Alligin ridge at the bealach between the two summits, from where grassy slopes can be followed westwards down into a neighbouring glen. This route is not straightforward under winter conditions.
