= Loch a' Bhraoin =

Loch in Ross-shire, Scotland

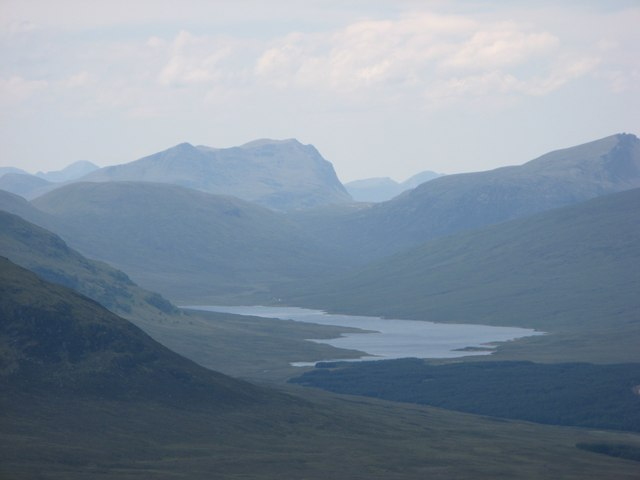
- A high level loch near a deep fjord head glen. The loch now provides the water for a scheme in the Cuileag Gorge. There were originally plans to enlarge the loch with a dam, but as this is one of the few surviving large high lochs with a natural shoreline, a smaller scale project was agreed. Slioch is in the background.

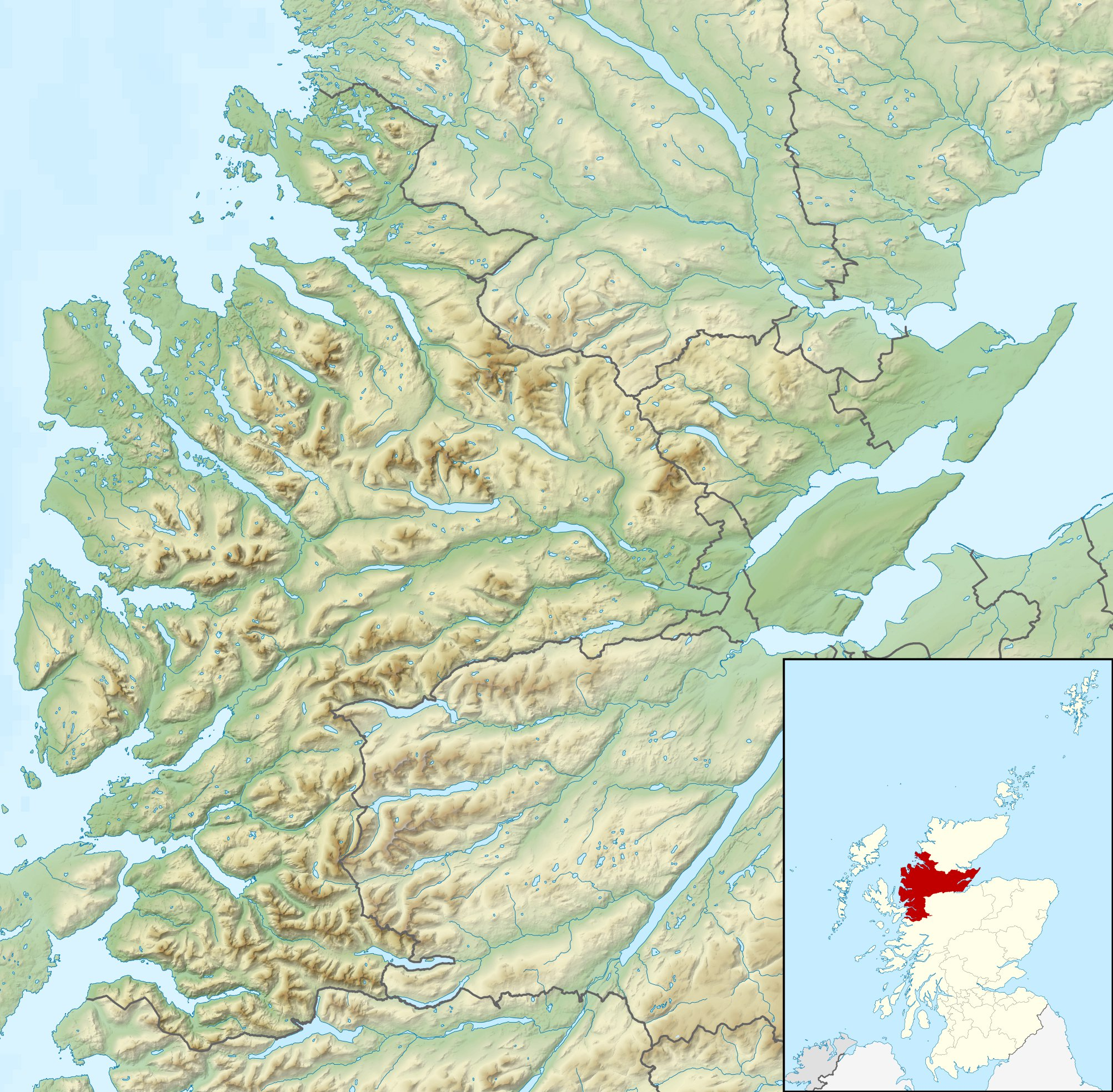
- Location within Ross and Cromarty
- Location: Scotland
- Coordinates: 57.719929°N 5.132437°W
- Type: freshwater loch
- River sources: Abhainn Cuileig, that is a major tributary of the River Broom.
- Basin countries: United Kingdom
- Surface area: 168 ha (420 acres)
- Average depth: 37 ft (11 m)
- Max. depth: 73 ft (22 m)
- Shore length^{1}: 10 km (6.2 mi)
- Surface elevation: 247 m (810 ft)
- ^{1} Shore length is not a well-defined measure.

Loch a' Bhraoin, Loch Broom (Scottish Gaelic: Loch of showers or drizzling rain), is a freshwater loch, located in Wester Ross, in Ross-shire, on the west coast of Scotland.

== Settlements ==
Due to the remoteness of the loch, there are very few settlements in the area. The main A832 road that is part of the Wester Ross Coastal Trail, leaves the main A835 road, at the Falls of Measach and passes the eastern end of the loch.

== Walking ==
Loch a' Bhraoin is considered an excellent location for walkers. There are essentially four routes into the mountains surrounding Loch a' Bhraoin. The main route is from the A832 road, taking the path east to west along Destitution Road to Loch a’ Bhraoin from the East. Also travelling from Poolewe past the Fionn Loch in the NW, which is the longest route. Travelling from Incheril over the Heights of Kinlochewe and the Kinlochewe Forest in the SW, and from Corrie Hallie that directly north of the loch.

== Geography ==
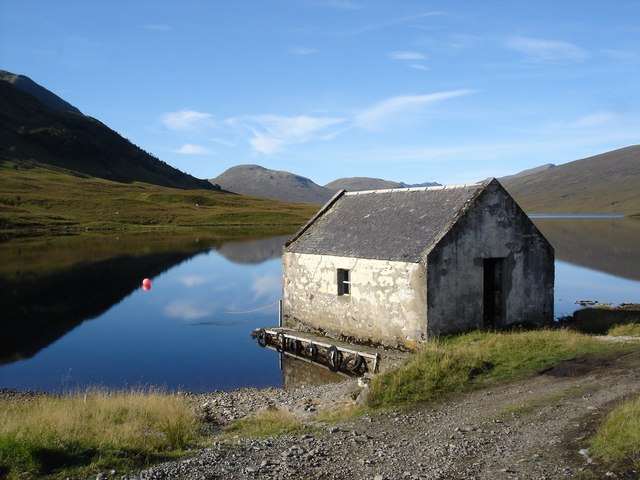
The Boat House on Loch a' Bhraoin

Loch a' Bhraoin lies about 7 miles to the south of the head of Loch Broom, and is surrounded by high hills. At the west end of the loch, about 2 miles from the end of the loch is the plateau of a' Chailleach that rises to 998.52metres above sea level. The loch is orientated on a northeast to southwest direction and is over 4 km in length. The maximum breadth of the loch is nearly 800metres wide.

On a north by northeast direction from a' Chailleach, the mountains have been folded extensively. Two corries overlook Loch a' Bhraoin to the north. The first of these is formed by the mountain Toman Còinnich at 935metres, which forms the corrie that contains Loch Toll an Lochain, where the direction of the corrie faces the northern end of the loch, similar to a giants seat. Further east again, is Sgurr Breac, which forms the peak of the second fold, which creates the corrie, that is intersected by a long shallow valley that descends from 600metres down to the north-east end of the loch.

On the northern end of the loch, there is several small hills, that make a shallow cliff which follows the curve of the loch. Overlooking the southwest end of the loch, is Creag Rainich at 807metres and Meall Dubh at 748metres comprising two hills. Further up the loch, both Bristeadh á Mhill Dhubh at 556metres and Meall an t-Sìthe at 601metres make up the main peaks of the show curve that follows the curve of the loch.

== Gallery ==
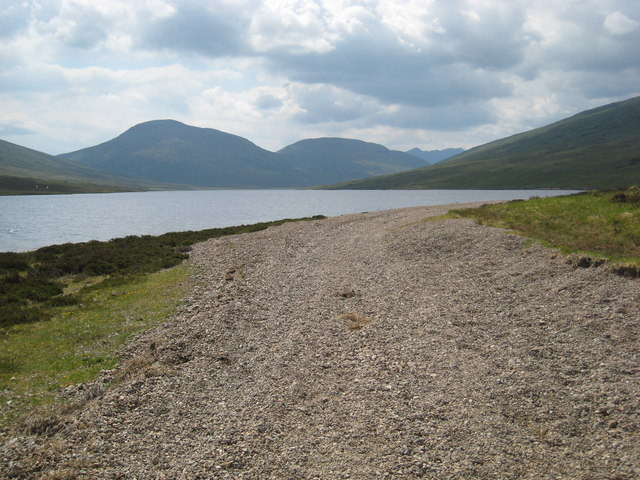
Looking west over Loch a' Bhraoin.

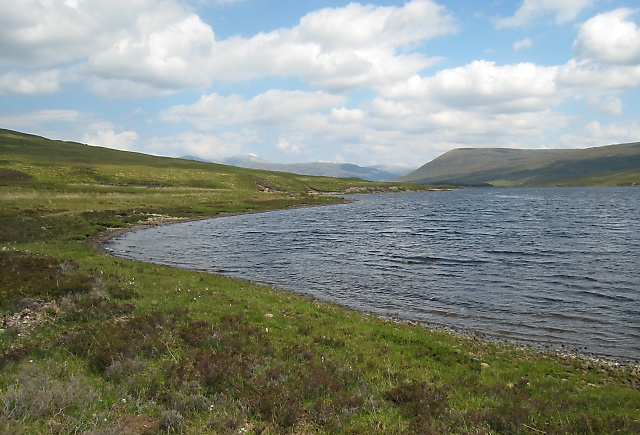
Heading north east along the shore of this loch.

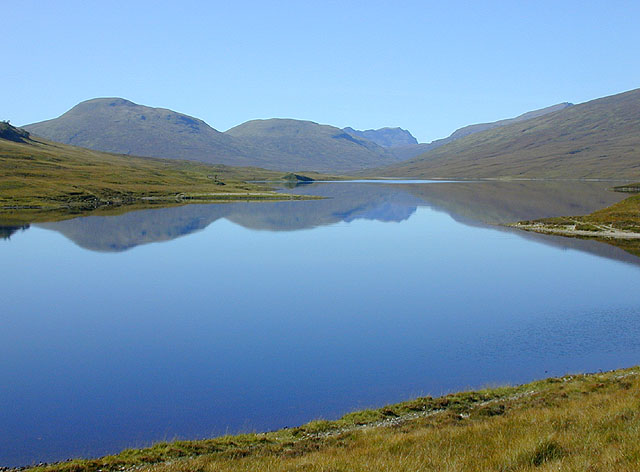
Loch a' Bhraoin With Slioch poking out behind Beinn Bheag in the distance.

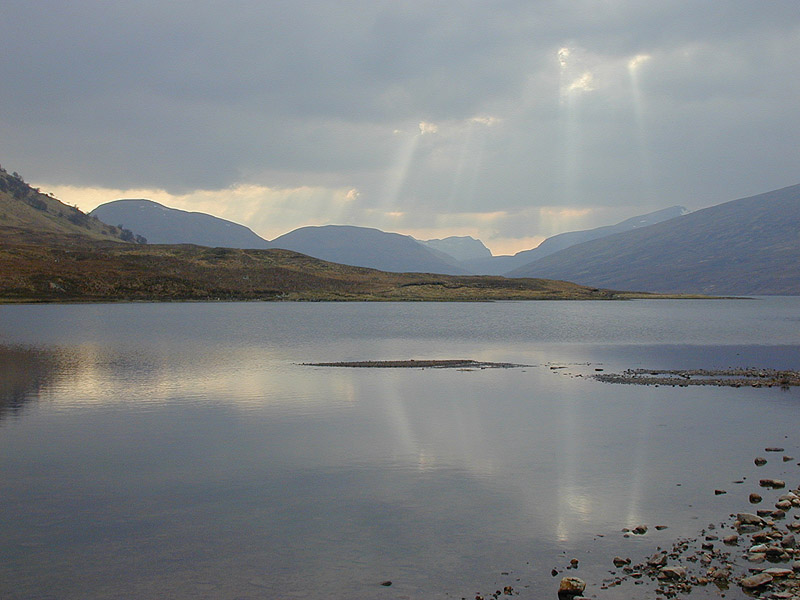
With the Fisherfield hills in the distance.

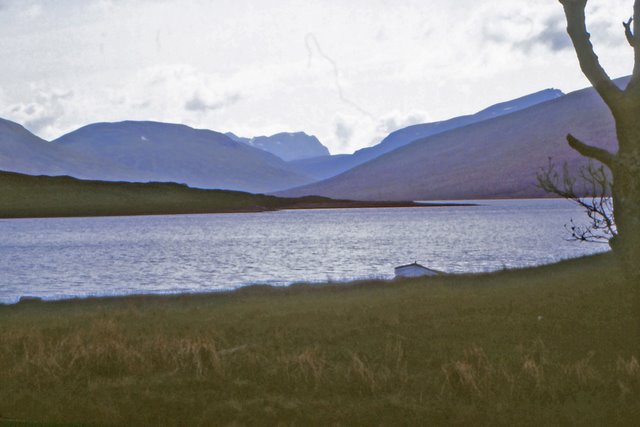
Looking up the loch from near its outflow. The furthest mountain is Slioch, the one on the right overtopping the nearer shoulder is the Fisherfield Munro Mullach Coire Mhic Fhearchair

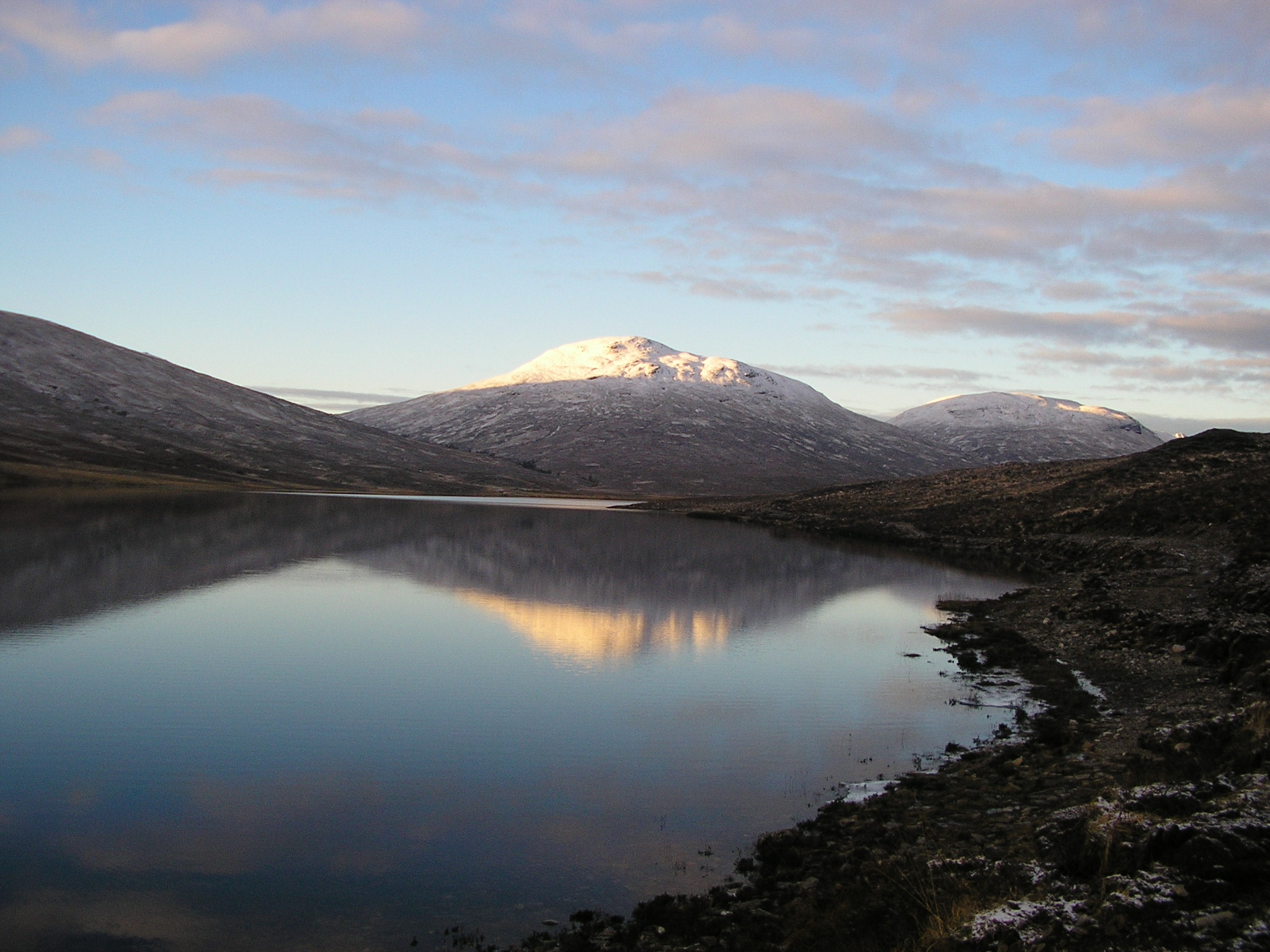
Groban, reflected in Loch a' Bhraoin

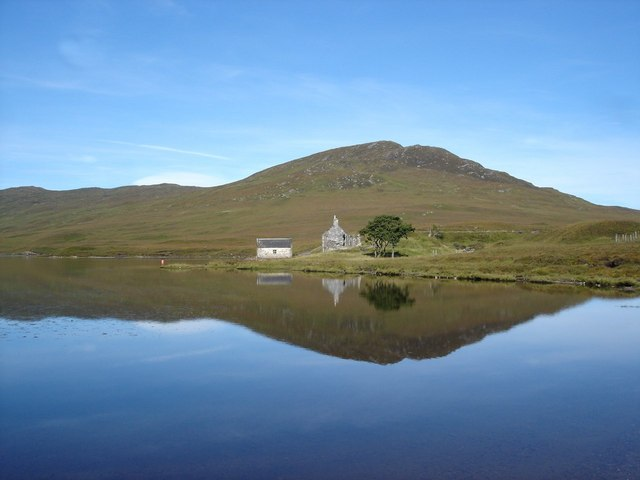
Ruin and Boathouse on Loch a' Bhraoin. This is the second time I have been here when the loch was flat calm.

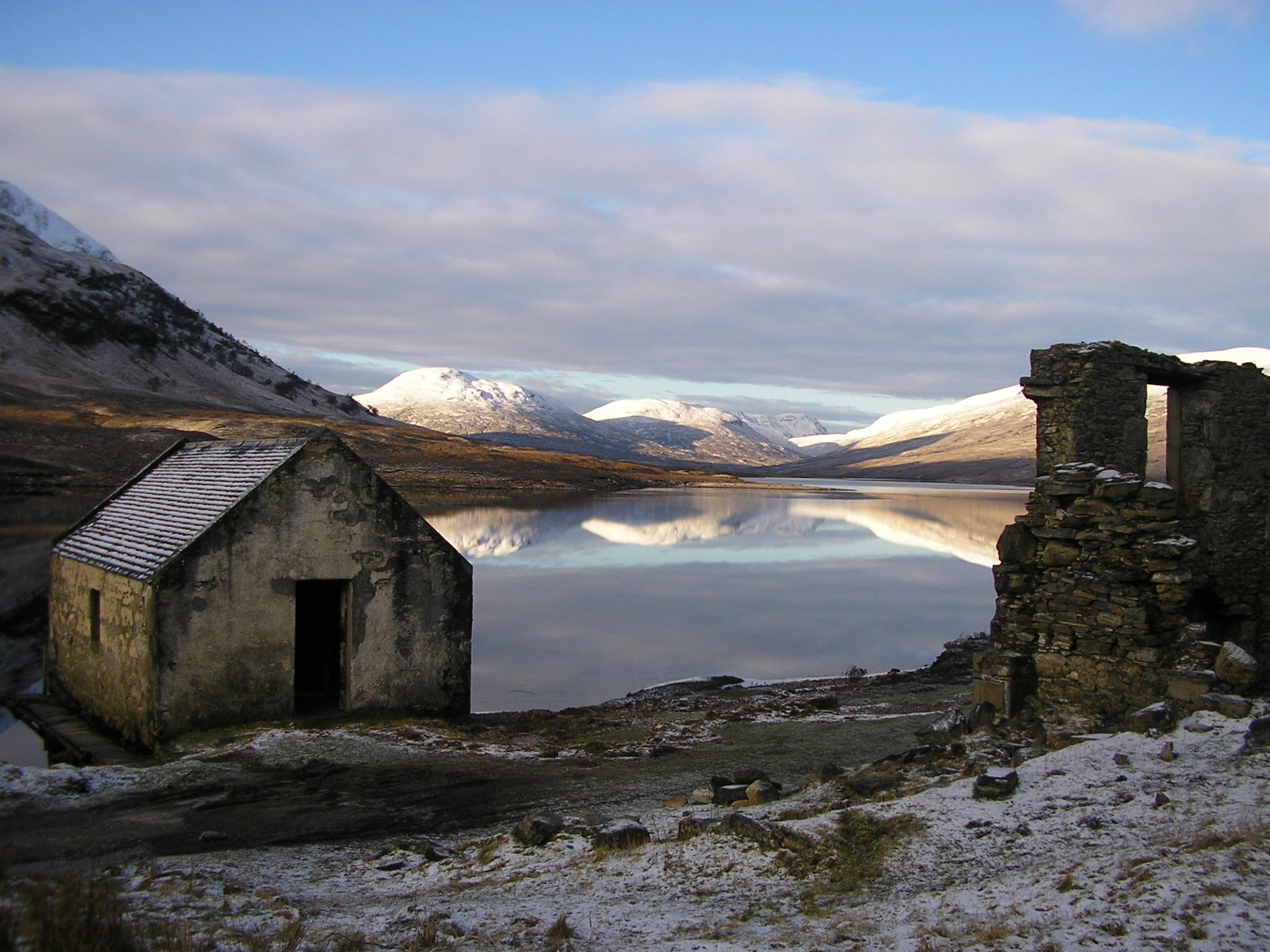
Groban and Beinn Bheag, reflected in Loch a' Bhraoin from the boathouse near the road.

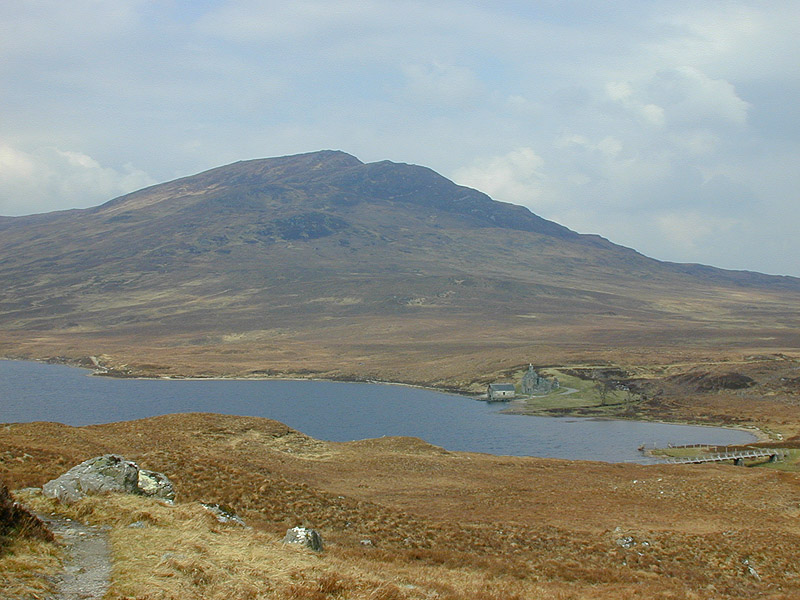
The east end of Loch a' Bhraoin. Taken from the path which follows the Allt Breabaig. Meall an t-Sithe is the good looking hill in the distance. For a similar view but taken 6 months later in Autumn

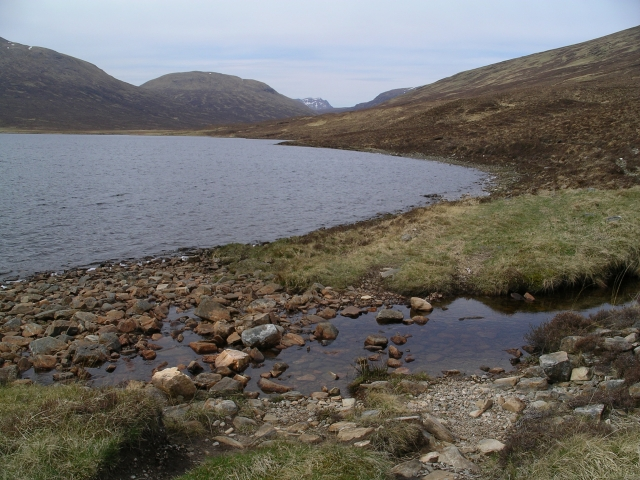
One of the many fords across the small burns feeding the N side of Loch a' Bhraoin, on the track to Lochivraon. The most distant peak in view, with some snow, is Slioch.
