= Loch na h-Oidhche =

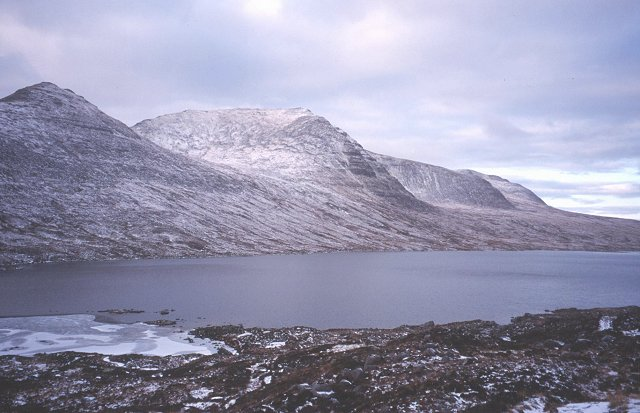
- Loch na h-Oidhche

- Location within Highland
- Location: Torridon, Wester Ross, Scotland
- Coordinates: 57°37′16″N 5°31′36″W
- Type: freshwater loch
- Primary outflows: Amhainn a'Gharbh-Choire
- Basin countries: Scotland
- Max. length: 1.75 mi (2.82 km)
- Max. width: 0.5 mi (0.80 km)
- Surface area: 347 acres (1.40 km^{2})
- Average depth: 54 ft (16 m)
- Max. depth: 121 ft (37 m)
- Water volume: 816,000,000 ft^{3} (23,100,000 m^{3})
- Surface elevation: approximately 1,250 ft (380 m)

Loch na h-Oidhche (Loch of the Night) is a remote freshwater loch lying between Loch Torridon and Loch Maree in the Flowerdale Forest, Wester Ross, Scotland. It is approximately 4.5 mi (7.2 km) north of the small village of Torridon and 8 mi (13 km) southeast of Gairloch.

The loch is oblong in shape and trends north by northwest to south by southeast. It drains by a bifurcated stream and several small lochs into Loch Maree and Loch Gairloch. The surrounding area is mountainous with Beinn an Eoin to the east and Baosbheinn to the west. The loch was surveyed on 7 August 1902 by T.N. Johnston and John Hewitt and later charted as part of the Sir John Murray and Laurence Pullar's Bathymetrical Survey of Fresh-Water Lochs of Scotland 1897-1909.

Wild brown trout are known to inhabit the loch.

== See also ==
- List of lochs in Scotland
