= Baosbheinn =

Mountain in Torridon, Northwest Highlands, Scotland

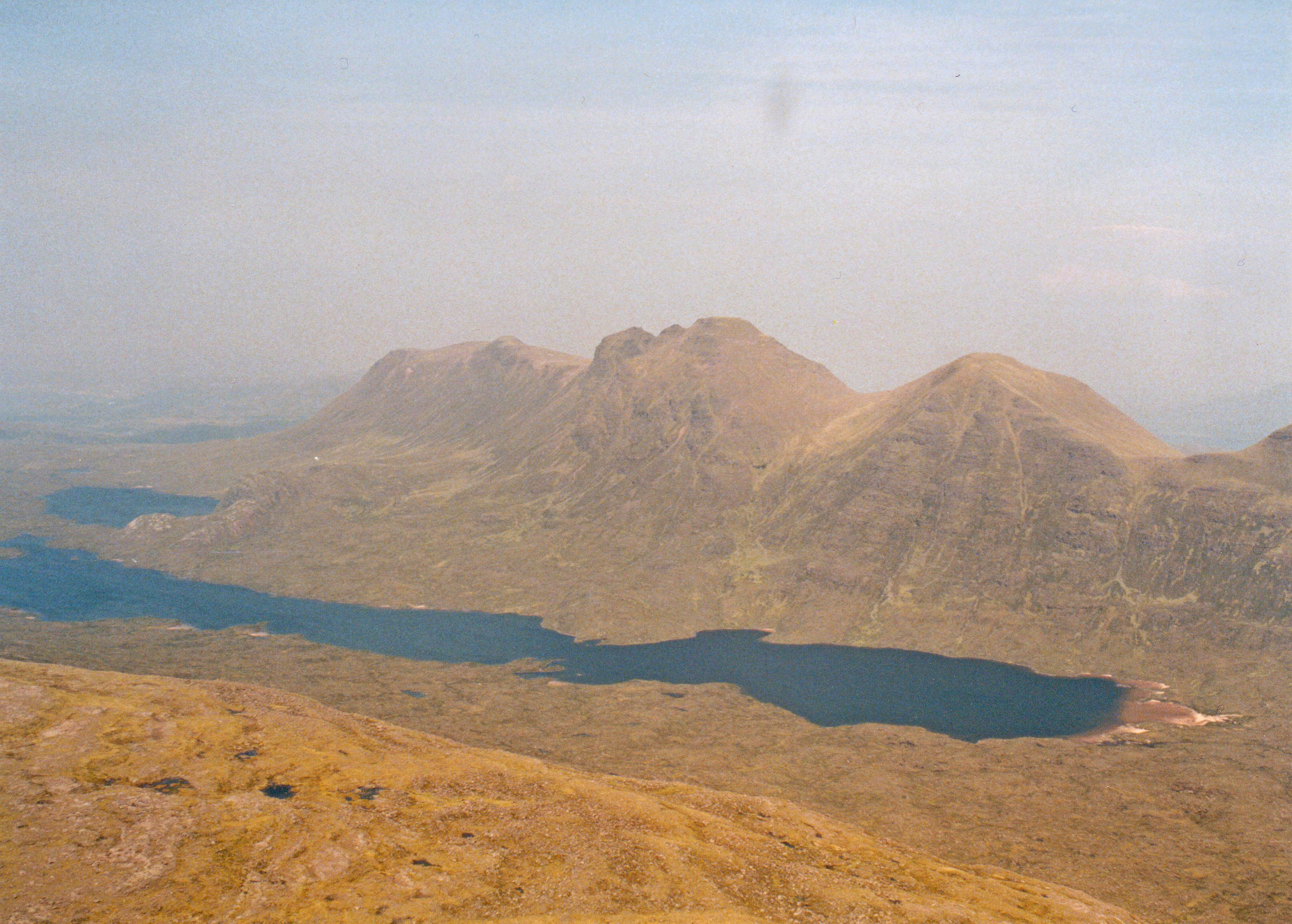
- Seen from Beinn Alligin, four km to the south.

Highest point
- Elevation: 875 m (2,871 ft)
- Prominence: 443 m (1,453 ft)
- Listing: Corbett, Marilyn
- Coordinates: 57°37′40″N 5°33′59″W

Naming
- English translation: Various (see text)
- Pronunciation: Boe-shvyn

Geography
- Location within Scotland
- Location: Wester Ross, Scotland
- Parent range: Northwest Highlands
- OS grid: NG870654
- Topo map: OS Landranger 19, OS Explorer 433

Baosbheinn is a Scottish mountain situated in the Torridon area of the Northwest Highlands. It stands in a remote area within the Flowerdale deer forest some 39 km NNE of Kyle of Lochalsh.

== Overview ==
Baosbheinn, which is made up of Torridon Sandstone reaches a height of 875 metres (2,871 feet) making it the 56th highest Corbett and the 277th highest Marilyn. It is a long elongated mountain with a NW-SE orientation. It has an impressive summit ridge, which barely drops below the 700 m (2,300 ft) contour in its 3 kilometres (1.9 miles) length. Its SW slopes drops away steeply and rockily towards Loch a’ Ghobhainn while its NE slopes are less precipitous, throwing out a series of spurs which produces three craggy corries. Strong hill walkers can climb Baosbheinn with the adjacent Corbett of Beinn an Eoin which stands across Loch na h-Oidhche and gives a demanding circular walk of 21 km (13 mi) which takes between six and nine hours.

== Etymology ==
The translation of Baosbheinn from the Scottish Gaelic language is usually given by guidebooks as “Wizard’s hill” this comes from the word baobh but strictly speaking this translates as a hag or bitch. Buidsear or fiosaiche is the usual word for a wizard. Scholars have put forward alternatives, one of these is beidhis-fjall from the Old Norse language which translates as hunting hill, with the Norse fjall later changed to the Gaelic bheinn . Local residents of Wester Ross refer to the hill as “mountain of the face”, this is explained by the fact that when viewed from Gairloch in the morning light, the hill resembles the appearance of a human head. This is supported by older spellings of the name which use derivations of bathais which translates as face or forehead. In conclusion, although the translated name is usually given as Wizard's Hill, the alternatives of Hill of the Face, Hunting Hill or Hill of the Hag (or Wicked Person) may have stronger supporting evidence.

== Geography and geology ==
Baosbheinn summit ridge is made up of five prominent high points, starting at the SE end of the ridge is the outlying shoulder of Ceann Beag (705 m (2,313 ft)) after a short descent to a col at c. 620 metres (2,030 feet) the ridge rises steeply over an unnamed top of c. 805 metres (2,641 feet) before continuing to the main summit (875 metres), named Sgorr Dubh on OS maps. The ridge continues for two km to reach the NW top (801 m (2,628 ft)) before descending to Creag an Fithich (738 m (2,421 ft)) at the northern end of the ridge. Baosbheinn has three north facing corries, An Rèidh-choire is the largest and lives up to its name of Smooth corrie, being quite open and grassy while the smaller Coire Beag and Coire Mor are more compact and are lined by crags.

Baosbheinn has one noteworthy geological feature: it is the site of the largest and most impressive protalus rampart in Great Britain. The rampart is situated at the NW end of the ridge below the crags of Creag an Fithich at a height of around 450 m (1,480 ft). It formed in post-glacial times when a massive rockslide or series of rockslides involving failure of approximately 200,000 m³ of rock over-rode a former snowbed and accumulated as a boulder ridge. The north west end of Baosbheinn where the protalus rampart is situated has been designated a Site of Special Scientific Interest over an area of 39,000,000 m².

== Ascents ==
The usual ascent of Baosbheinn starts at a parking place at the Red Barn on the A832 road (NG856720). Most walking guidebooks recommend climbing Baosbheinn along with Beinn an Eoin, this calls for the ascent of Beinn an Eoin first, however a direct ascent of Baosbheinn is possible although the crossing of the river, the Abhainn a’ Gharbh Choire can be difficult in spate conditions. The walk goes SE on the track which leads to Loch na h-Oidhche, the early part of the track goes through a recently sown plantation just to the East of Loch Bad na Sgalag where over 1 million trees of native species have been planted. The original trees in this area were cut down in the 16th and 17th centuries to feed the ironworks on the shore of Loch Maree. The track is left after 3 km (1.9 mi) and the ridge of Baosbheinn can be attained by crossing pathless moorland.
