= Wester Ross Coastal Trail =

Road in Scotland

The Wester Ross Coastal Trail is a route in the Western part of the Scottish Highlands. The route consists of the A832 road, the A896 road and the Applecross Peninsula. The northern end of the route is the junction with the A835 south of Ullapool. The southern end of the route is at Auchtertyre near Kyle of Lochalsh.

== Route ==
From the north, the route passes the following places:

- An Teallach - 1,062m
- Little Loch Broom,
- Loch Ewe,
- Tournaig,
- Gairloch and Loch Gairloch,
- Loch Maree,
- Slioch - 981m
- Beinn Eighe - 1,110m
- Fionn Bheinn - 933m
- Loch Torridon
- Torridon
- Loch Shieldaig
- Applecross
- Bealach na Ba - fabulous mountain pass
- Lochcarron
- An Ruadh-stac - 892m
- Auchtertyre
