= Dundonnell River =

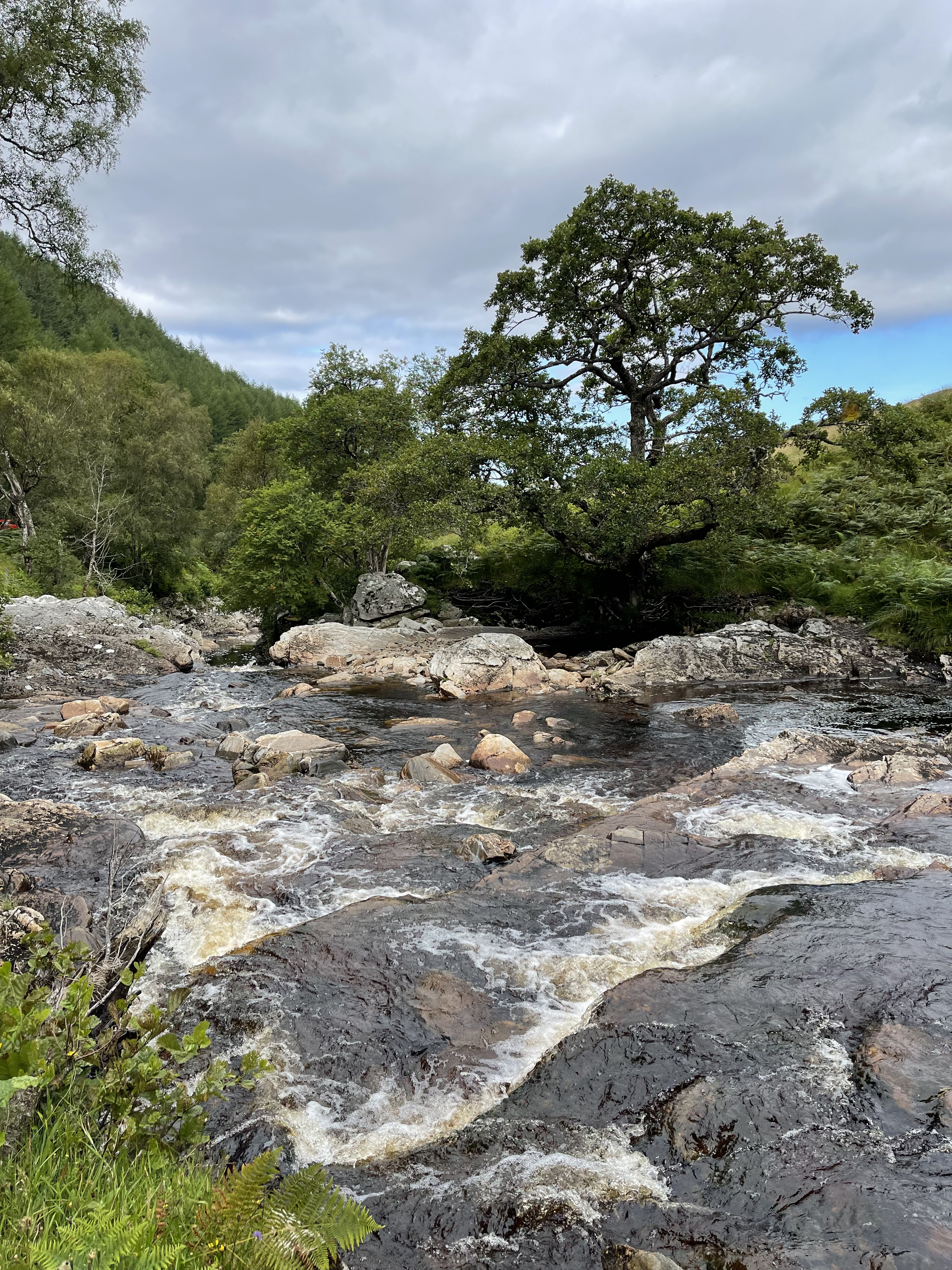
- The Dundonnell River at Airigh Ghiorid

Location
- Country: Scotland

Physical characteristics
- Source
  - location: Meall Dubh
  - coordinates: 57°43′23″N 5°11′30″W
  - elevation: 2,356 ft (718 m)
- Mouth
  - location: Little Loch Broom
  - coordinates: 57°50′56″N 5°13′21″W
  - elevation: 0 ft (0 m)
- Length: 14.4 mi (23.2 km)

The Dundonnell River is a river in Ross and Cromarty, in the Scottish Highlands.

The river rises in a lochan on the slopes of Meall Dubh, before flowing north into the Dundonnell Forest. The A832 road follows its course roughly NNW, before the river flows through Strath Beag and meets Little Loch Broom at its estuary just north-west of Dundonnell.
