= Glen Docherty =

Valley in Scotland

Coordinates: 57°35′34″N 5°15′17″W

Panoramic View of Glen Docherty taken from the viewpoint on Srón na Gaoithe

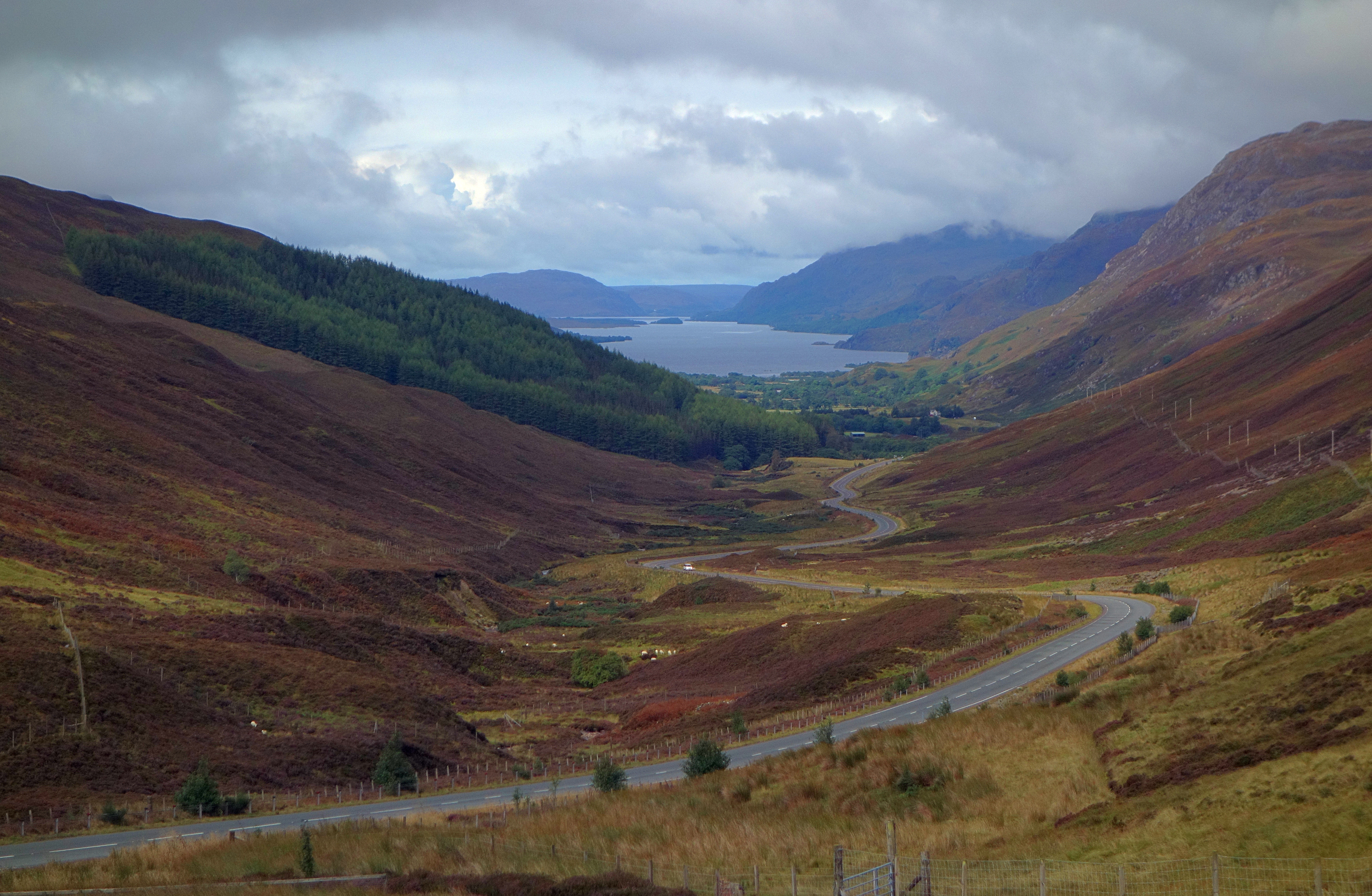
Glen Docherty looking towards Loch Maree

Glen Docherty (Scottish Gaelic: Gleann Dochartaich) is a glen in Wester Ross in Scotland, between Loch Maree and Kinlochewe to the west and Loch a'Chroisg and Achnasheen to the east.

The A832 road runs through the glen, which runs between the peaks of Càrn a' Ghlinne (539 metres (1,768 ft)) to the north and Carn Loisgte (446 metres (1,463 ft)) to the south. Until recently this was a single track road with passing places, but 5.8 kilometres (3.6 mi) of the road has now been upgraded to double track.

== Formation ==
Volcanic activity in this region ceased about 50 million years ago, after which the landscape was shaped by glaciation from about 1.8 million years ago to the end of the Great Ice Age about 10,000 years ago. The U-shaped glen of Glen Docherty is typical of a glen formed by the action of glaciers.
