= Ardessie =

Coordinates: 57.85336°N 5.28427°W

Ardessie: Scottish Gaelic: Àird Easaidh
- Location within the Highland council area
- OS grid reference: NH052896
- Council area: Highland
- Country: Scotland
- Sovereign state: United Kingdom
- Postcode district: IV23 2
- Police: Scotland
- Fire: Scottish
- Ambulance: Scottish
- UK Parliament: Ross, Skye and Lochaber
- Scottish Parliament: Caithness, Sutherland and Ross

Ardessie (Scottish Gaelic: Àird Easaidh) is a small hamlet on the south western shore of Little Loch Broom, two miles (three kilometres) northwest of Dundonnell, in Garve, Ross-shire, in the Highland region and is in within the Scottish council area of Highland. Scotland.
