= Gorstan =

Coordinates: 57.62275°N 4.70525°W

Gorstan: Scottish Gaelic: An Goirtean
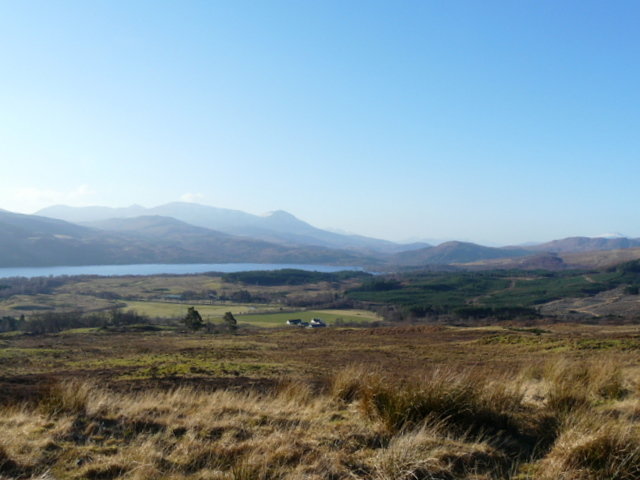
- Above Corriemoillie Farm, to the west of Gorstan. Loch Luichart is visible.

- Location within the Ross and Cromarty area
- OS grid reference: NH385624
- Council area: Highland
- Country: Scotland
- Sovereign state: United Kingdom
- Post town: Garve
- Postcode district: IV23 2
- Police: Scotland
- Fire: Scottish
- Ambulance: Scottish

Gorstan (Scottish Gaelic: An Goirtean) is a small hamlet about a mile northwest of Garve in the Ross-shire region in the Scottish council area of Highland.

It is situated at the junction between the A835 towards Ullapool, and the A832 towards Achnasheen.
