= Tournaig =

Coordinates: 57.79117°N 5.56707°W

- Location within the Highland council area
- OS grid reference: NG880835
- Council area: Highland
- Country: Scotland
- Sovereign state: United Kingdom
- Post town: Poolewe
- Postcode district: IV22 2
- Police: Scotland
- Fire: Scottish
- Ambulance: Scottish

Tournaig is a remote scattered crofting and fishing hamlet, that sits on the confluence of the sea loch, Loch Thùrnaig to the west, and Loch Nan Dailthean to the south in Achnasheen, Ross-shire, Scottish Highlands and is in the Scottish council area of Highland.

During World War II a Balloon Barrage called the Loch Ewe defences was stationed near Tournaig farmstead. Several of the structures are still there including the watertower and several huts.

The fishing village of Poolewe is situated less than 2 miles south along the A832 road.
