= Dundonnell =

Coordinates: 57.83881°N 5.21147°W

Dundonnell: Scottish Gaelic: Achadh Dà Dhòmhnaill
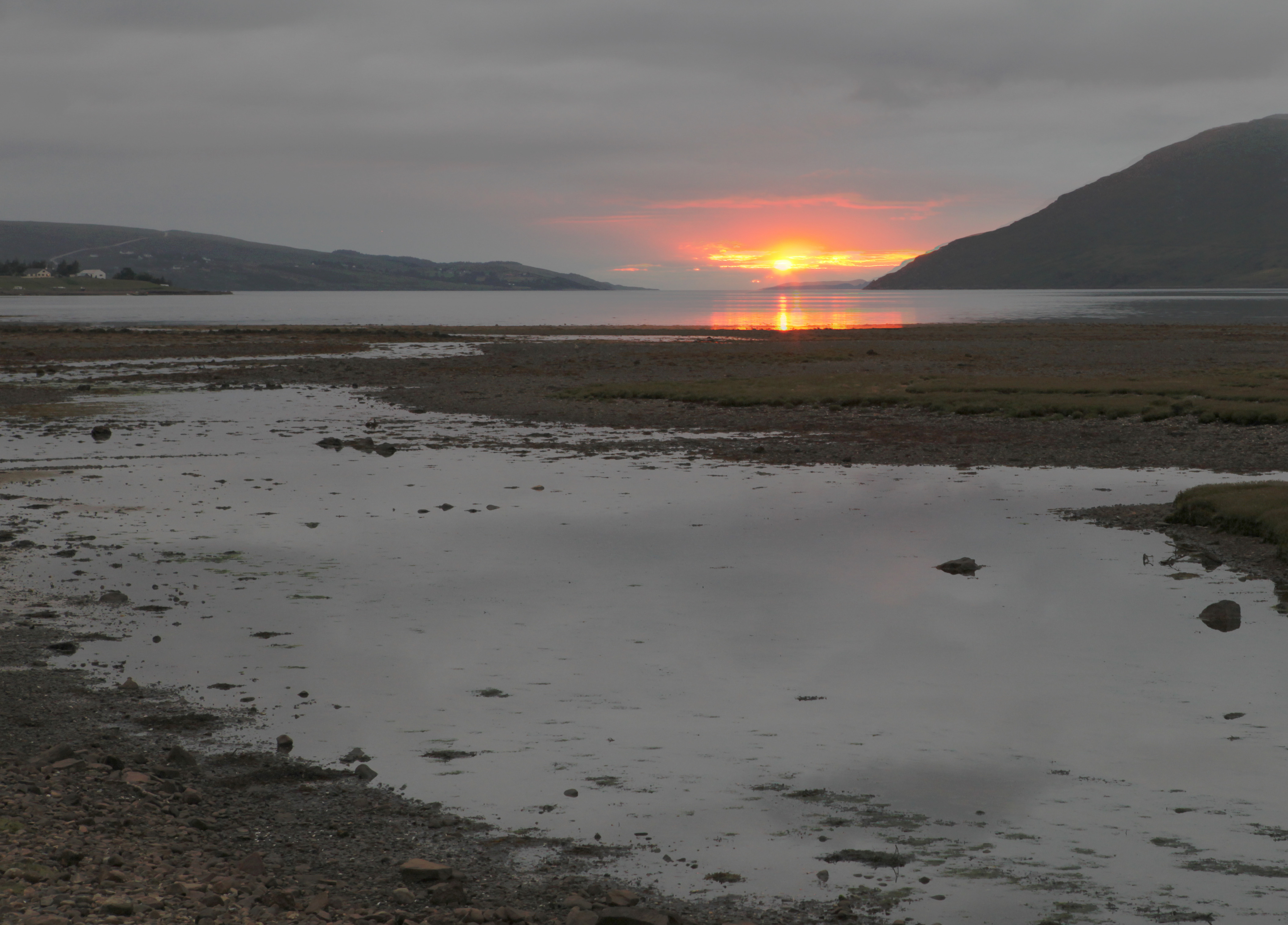
- Sunset in Dundonnell at the start of the Glorious Twelfth.

- Location within the Ross and Cromarty area
- OS grid reference: NH094877
- Council area: Highland
- Lieutenancy area: Ross and Cromarty
- Country: Scotland
- Sovereign state: United Kingdom
- Post town: GARVE
- Postcode district: IV23 2
- Dialling code: 01854
- Police: Scotland
- Fire: Scottish
- Ambulance: Scottish
- UK Parliament: Ross, Skye and Lochaber
- Scottish Parliament: Ross, Skye and Inverness West

Dundonnell (Gaelic: Achadh Dà Dhòmhnaill) is a village in Ross and Cromarty, Scotland, on the south side of Little Loch Broom and at the foot of An Teallach, right at the north of the area commonly known as the "Great Wilderness". It is situated on the A832 road, 30 miles (48 km) east of Gairloch and 13.4 miles (21.6 km) west of Braemore Junction.

Dundonnell gives its name to the Dundonnell River, which flows into Little Loch Broom at its estuary just north-west of the village.

There is an independent youth hostel, a farm and a hotel. Many semi-wild sheep roam the area, which is the most inland point of the loch. The Ardessie Falls pour into the loch nearby. Local wildlife includes cormorants, lesser black-backed gulls and song thrushes.

== Dundonnell estate ==
The 33,000-acre Dundonnell estate was bought by the English lyricist Sir Tim Rice in 1998. In 2004, his wife, Lady Jane Rice, contacted the conservationist Roy Dennis about the possibility of re-establishing red squirrels in the estate's woodlands. A feasibility study undertaken by Dennis in 2005 concluded that the woodland provided a suitable habitat for squirrels. A translocation project was approved by Scottish Natural Heritage in 2007 and a programme of releases was taken forward in 2009 by Jane Rice, the estate's keeper, Alasdair Macdonald, and the Highland Red Squirrel Group, using squirrels trapped at locations in Badenoch, Strathspey, Moray, Nairn and Inverness.

== See also ==
- Ardessie
