= Wester Ross =

Area in the North West Highlands of Scotland

Wester Ross National Scenic Area
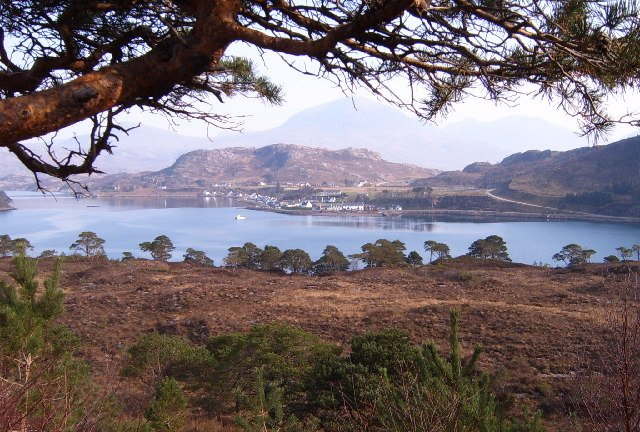
- Shieldaig, viewed from the road to Applecross

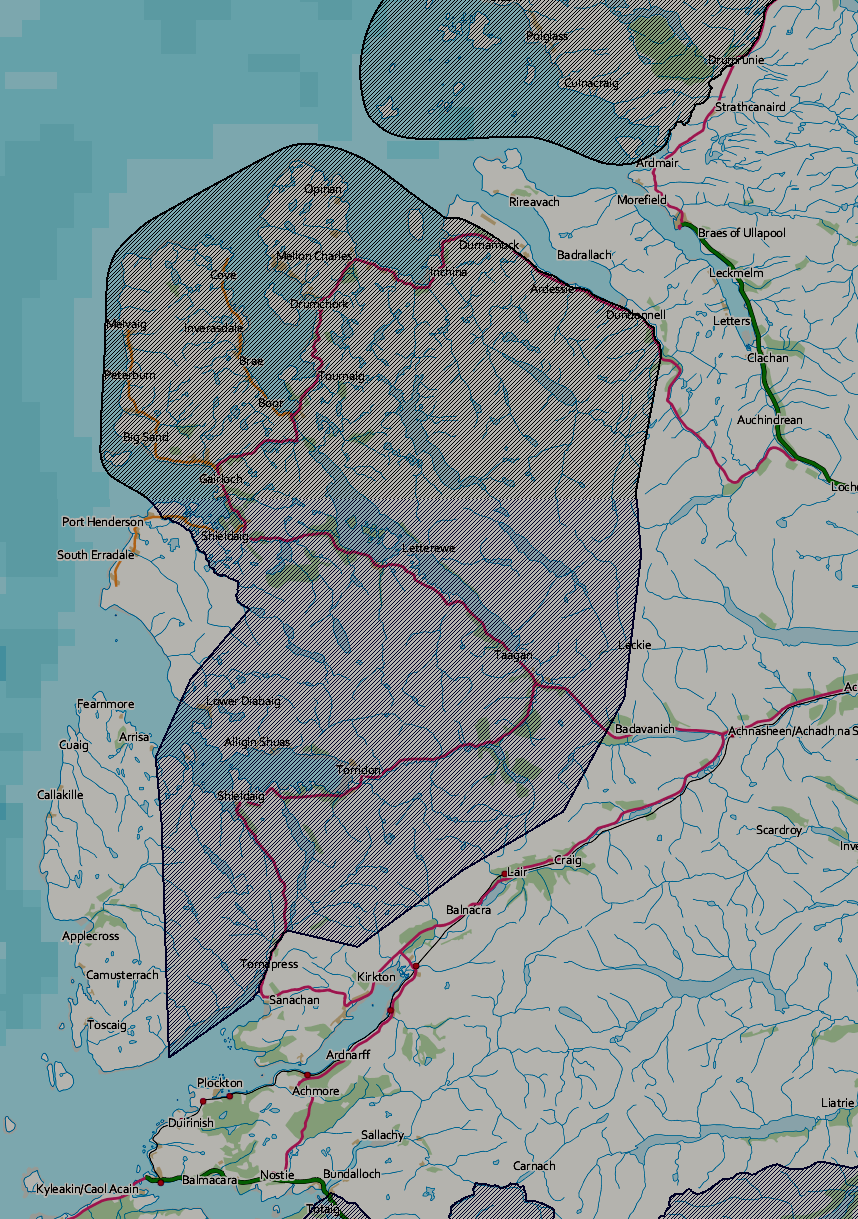
- A map of the Wester Ross National Scenic Area.
- Location: Ross and Cromarty, Scotland
- Coordinates: 57.666°N 5.219°W
- Area: 163,456 ha (631.11 sq mi)/1634.58 km^{2}
- Established: 1981
- Governing body: NatureScot

Wester Ross (Scottish Gaelic: Ros an Iar) is an area of the Northwest Highlands of Scotland in the council area of Highland. The area is loosely defined, and has never been used as a formal administrative region in its own right, but is generally regarded as lying to the west of the main watershed of Ross (the eastern part of Ross being Easter Ross), thus forming the western half of the county of Ross and Cromarty. The southwesternmost part of Ross and Cromarty, Lochalsh, is not considered part of Wester Ross by the local tourist organisation, Visit Wester Ross, but is included within the definition used for the Wester Ross Biosphere Reserve.

Wester Ross has one of the lowest population densities in Europe, with just 1.6 people per km^{2}, who live mostly in small crofting townships along the coastline of the region. The area is renowned for the scenic splendour of its mountains and coastline, and the range of wildlife that can be seen. It is a popular tourist destination, receiving around 70,000 visitors each year. Tourism forms a major part of the economic activity of the area, accounting for 35% of all employment. Other major economic activities in the area include commercial fishing, renewable energy, agriculture and fish farming.

Much of Wester Ross is designated as a national scenic area, one of 40 such areas in Scotland which are defined so as to identify areas of exceptional scenery and to ensure their protection from inappropriate development. Scenic spots including Loch Maree, Inverewe Garden, Corrieshalloch Gorge, Glen Docherty and the Bealach na Bà. Wester Ross was designated as a Biosphere Reserve under UNESCO’s "Man and the Biosphere" (MAB) Programme in April 2016. The Wester Ross Biosphere Reserve now covers 5,200 square kilometres of Wester Ross and Lochalsh. This new-style biosphere, which covers an area over 100 times larger than the original designation, is a place where people live and actively learn about their surroundings to inspire a legacy rich in both natural and cultural heritage.

== Geology ==
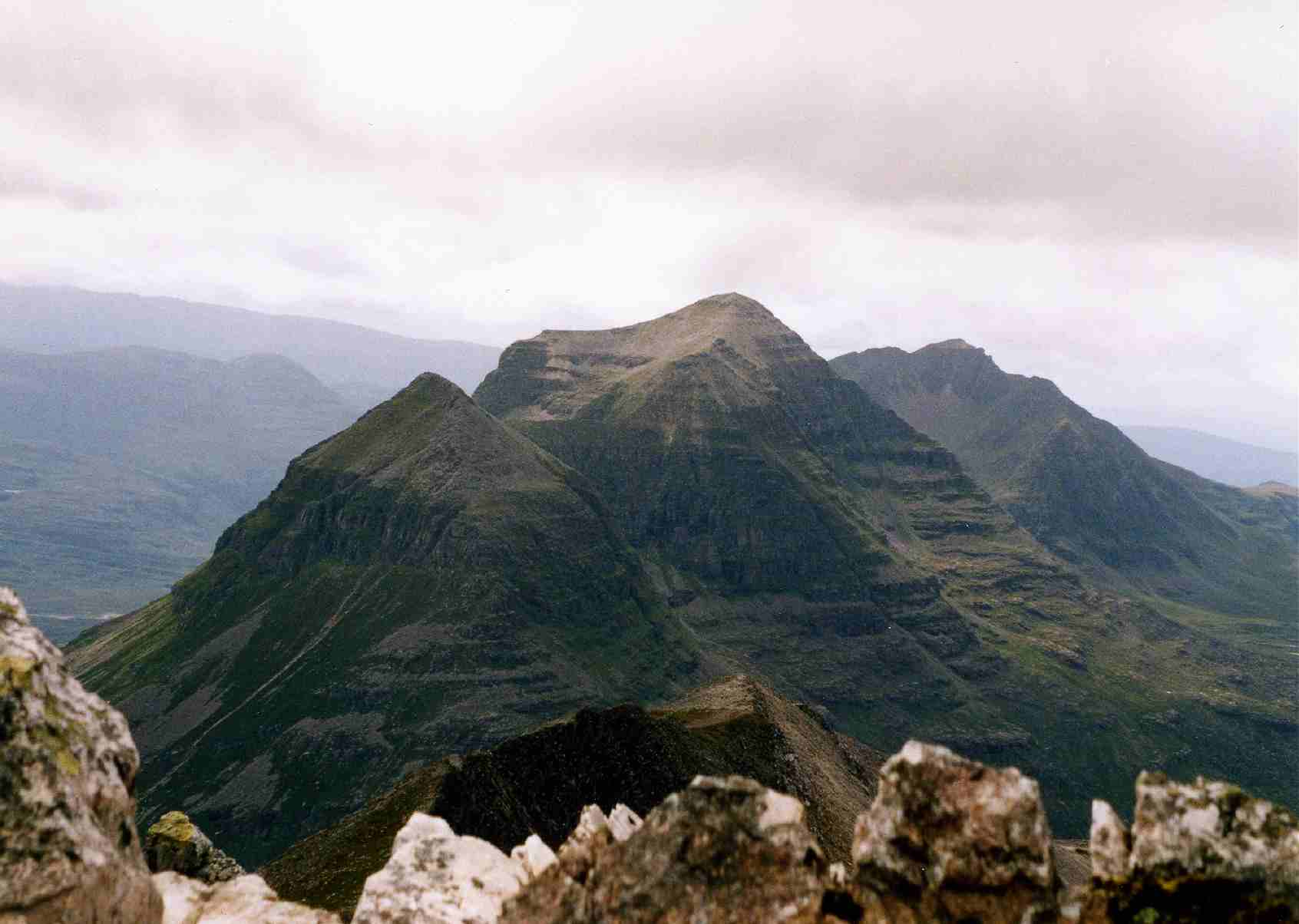
Liathach consists of steeply-terraced Torridonian sandstone.

The geology of Wester Ross consists predominantly of Torridonian sandstone and Lewisian gneiss. The latter was formed during the Precambrian period, and is the oldest rock type found in Scotland; indeed the rocks around Gruinard Bay are, at 2.5 billion years old, amongst the oldest rocks in the world. The Torridonian sandstone was formed by the deposition of sediment on top of the gneiss around 750 million years ago. The linear geological feature of Moine Thrust Belt runs northeast across the area from near Kyle of Lochalsh. The area was heavily glaciated during the ice age, with all but the highest peaks being covered by glaciers, leading to the steep-sided glens and deep sea lochs that characterise the area today.

== Geography ==
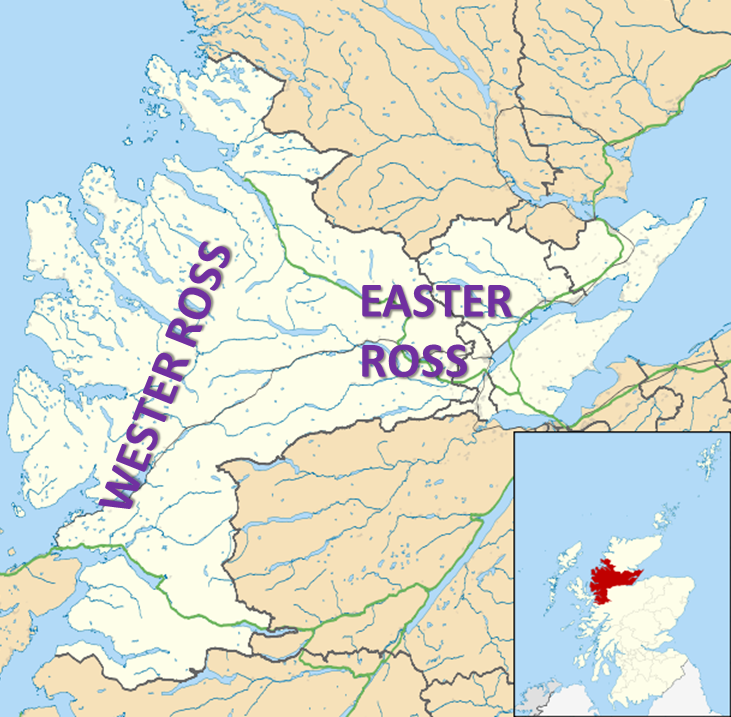
Location of Wester Ross and Easter Ross within Scotland.

Wester Ross is well known for its spectacular mountain scenery, especially the Torridon Hills which includes such peaks as Beinn Eighe and Liathach. Although many peaks in the Northwest highlands exhibit Torridonian geology, the Torridon Hills are generally considered only to be those in the Torridon Forest to the north of Glen Torridon: the Munros of Liathach, Beinn Eighe, and Beinn Alligin; and the Corbetts of Beinn Dearg, Baosbheinn and Beinn an Eoin. Other notable "Torridonian" peaks in Wester Ross include An Teallach and Slioch, in the Dundonnell and Fisherfield Forest in the north of the area, and the hills of the Coulin Forest between Glen Torridon and Strathcarron.

Torridonian hills exhibit some of the most dramatic mountain scenery in the British Isles, surpassed in grandeur probably only by the Cuillin of Skye. The hills sit apart from each other, and are often likened to castles. They have steep terraced sides, and broken summit crests, riven into many pinnacles. There are many steep gullies running down the terraced sides. The summit ridges provide excellent scrambling, and are popular with hill walkers and mountaineers. However, like many ridge routes, there are few escape points, so once committed, the scrambler or hillwalker must complete the entire ridge before descent. Under winter conditions, many walking routes in Wester Ross become serious expeditions.

In contrast to the isolated Torridonian peaks that characterise much of Wester Ross, the mountains of Kintail in the south of the area take the form of peaks linked by ridges that rise steeply from narrow glens and the sea.

Most of the major roads in the area radiate out from the more populated areas of Easter Ross, and link the settlements on the western coast to Inverness. Lesser roads link these east–west routes to form a north–south route along the coast between Kyle of Lochalsh and Ullapool. This route has been marketed to tourists as the Wester Ross Coastal Trail, and also forms part of the North Coast 500 tourist route. The only railway line in Wester Ross is the Kyle of Lochalsh line, which is operated by ScotRail and provides a link between the southern part of the region and Inverness. Four services a day operate on the line, calling at stations at Achnasheen, Achnashellach, Strathcarron, Attadale, Stromeferry, Duncraig, Plockton and Duirinish, terminating at Kyle of Lochalsh.

=== Climate ===
Despite being located at a latitude of between 57.2° and 58.0° North Wester Ross experiences a relatively mild maritime climate (Köppen Cfb) due to the influence of the Gulf Stream. The tables below provide data for three locations within the area: Aultbea, located on the coast near Poolewe; Kinlochewe, located in a more inland position at the head of Loch Maree; and the summit of the Bealach na Bà, located 600 m above sea level in a coastal location.

Climate data for Aultbea
Month	Jan	Feb	Mar	Apr	May	Jun	Jul	Aug	Sep	Oct	Nov	Dec	Year
Mean daily maximum °C (°F)	7.6 (45.7)	7.6 (45.7)	8.8 (47.8)	11.0 (51.8)	13.8 (56.8)	15.6 (60.1)	17.2 (63.0)	16.9 (62.4)	15.2 (59.4)	12.5 (54.5)	9.8 (49.6)	8.0 (46.4)	12.0 (53.6)
Mean daily minimum °C (°F)	2.7 (36.9)	2.5 (36.5)	3.5 (38.3)	4.6 (40.3)	6.7 (44.1)	9.2 (48.6)	11.4 (52.5)	11.3 (52.3)	9.6 (49.3)	7.5 (45.5)	5.0 (41.0)	3.0 (37.4)	6.4 (43.5)
Average rainfall mm (inches)	170.4 (6.71)	129.4 (5.09)	133.8 (5.27)	74.9 (2.95)	70.5 (2.78)	77.4 (3.05)	74.8 (2.94)	97.3 (3.83)	141.3 (5.56)	164.7 (6.48)	172.3 (6.78)	160.8 (6.33)	1,467.6 (57.78)

Climate data for Kinlochewe
Month	Jan	Feb	Mar	Apr	May	Jun	Jul	Aug	Sep	Oct	Nov	Dec	Year
Mean daily maximum °C (°F)	7.1 (44.8)	7.5 (45.5)	9.1 (48.4)	11.8 (53.2)	15.0 (59.0)	16.8 (62.2)	18.4 (65.1)	18.0 (64.4)	15.8 (60.4)	12.5 (54.5)	9.4 (48.9)	7.1 (44.8)	12.4 (54.3)
Mean daily minimum °C (°F)	0.9 (33.6)	0.9 (33.6)	2.2 (36.0)	3.5 (38.3)	5.7 (42.3)	8.6 (47.5)	10.8 (51.4)	10.5 (50.9)	8.4 (47.1)	5.7 (42.3)	3.1 (37.6)	0.9 (33.6)	5.1 (41.2)
Average rainfall mm (inches)	309.3 (12.18)	238.0 (9.37)	236.6 (9.31)	117.5 (4.63)	98.5 (3.88)	100.0 (3.94)	101.5 (4.00)	135.0 (5.31)	191.3 (7.53)	239.2 (9.42)	252.0 (9.92)	263.7 (10.38)	2,282.6 (89.87)
Mean monthly sunshine hours	18.0	41.7	67.2	111.1	152.2	123.9	111.3	104.7	80.4	49.4	23.5	14.6	898.0

Climate data for the summit of the Bealach na Bà
Month	Jan	Feb	Mar	Apr	May	Jun	Jul	Aug	Sep	Oct	Nov	Dec	Year
Mean daily maximum °C (°F)	1.6 (34.9)	1.2 (34.2)	2.2 (36.0)	3.6 (38.5)	6.9 (44.4)	9.1 (48.4)	10.5 (50.9)	10.5 (50.9)	8.7 (47.7)	6.0 (42.8)	3.5 (38.3)	2.3 (36.1)	5.5 (41.9)
Mean daily minimum °C (°F)	−2.1 (28.2)	−2.4 (27.7)	−1.5 (29.3)	−0.4 (31.3)	2.1 (35.8)	4.7 (40.5)	6.6 (43.9)	6.7 (44.1)	5.1 (41.2)	2.9 (37.2)	0.1 (32.2)	−1.2 (29.8)	1.7 (35.1)

== History ==
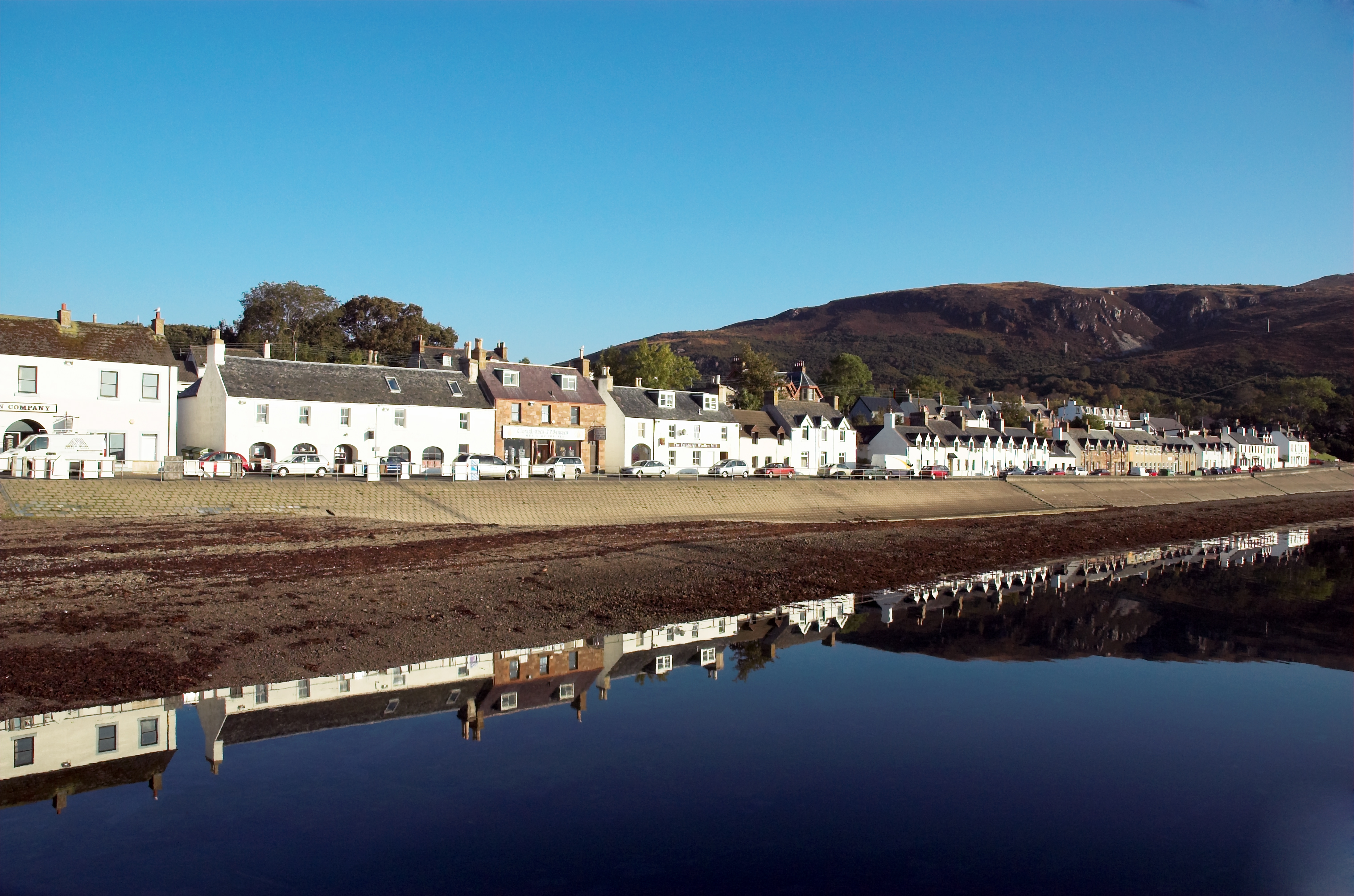
Ullapool, founded as a fishing village in 1788.

There are traces of Mesolithic occupation at several sites in Wester Ross, including at Redpoint and Shieldaig. Excavations of a Mesolithic rock shelter and shell midden at Sand on the Applecross peninsula revealed a variety of tools made from bone, stone and antler, together with waste from tool manufacture and food processing. The Mesolithic people were largely nomadic, and permanent settlements were first built during the Neolithic era, when trees were felled to create land for farming.

The area was inhabited by Picts in late antiquity, and was largely Christian by the 7th century. From the 8th century Wester Ross, along with much of the western seaboard of Scotland, came under Norse domination, and placename evidence suggests that the Pictish language seems to have been entirely replaced wherever the Norsemen encountered it, with most names considered likely to be of Medieval rather than pre-Norse origin. Following the decline of Norse power in western Scotland after their defeat at the Battle of Largs the semi-independent Lords of the Isles came to dominate the western coast until the 15th century, when Scottish Crown was able to cement its control over the region.

The 16th century marked the height of the Clan structure in the Highlands, and Wester Ross was occupied by different clans, chiefly the Mackenzies and the Macdonalds. Historically the chiefs of the Clan Donald held the title of Lord of the Isles until 1493, and two of those chiefs also held the title of Earl of Ross until 1476. During this period the area was farmed under the communal run-rig system, with people living in small townships, growing oats, bere (barley), and later potatoes. Cattle-rearing was the chief economic activity, with cattle being raised in the glens and then driven to market. This trade expanded during the early 19th century, due to the demands of the new industrial cities and the British armed forces for cattle for beef.

The clan structure began to break down in the 18th century, as clan chiefs came to see themselves as landlords, and the small tenant farmers had no legal answer to a landlord who wished to have them removed. During the late 18th and 19th centuries, the Highland Clearances saw tenants being forcibly moved to become crofters, a system under which their labour would be available when required by their landlords: they would be workers first and farmers second. Crofters were employed in enterprises such as fishing (Ullapool in the north of Wester Ross was built by the British Fishing Society in the 1780-90s) and kelping (the collection and processing of kelp to create products such as soda ash). In the later stages of the clearances the driver ceased to be industrial enterprises, but simply to clear the land for sheep farming, and later deer forests. At this point emigration was often the only option to those removed from their homes.

Under pressure from the Highland Land League and public opinion a series of inquiries were held into the situation, leading to the Crofters' Holdings (Scotland) Act 1886 which put an end to the clearances by granting security of tenure to crofters. However the act did not break up large estates, and Wester Ross continues to consist chiefly of large single-owner estates.

== Environment ==
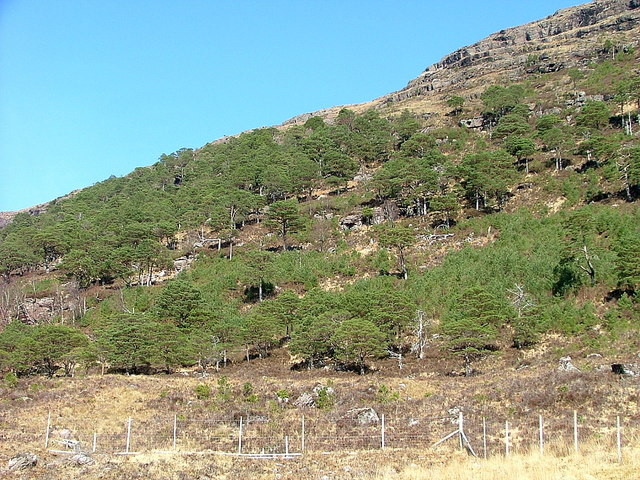
Scots pine at Coille Creag-Loch near Shieldaig.

There are many different habitats in Wester Ross, ranging from the marine and coastal environment to mountain summits over 1000 m above sea level. The area forms one of the Watsonian vice-counties, geographical divisions of the British Isles used for the purposes of biological recording and other scientific data-gathering.

The coastline is mostly formed of cliffs and rocky shores covered with barnacles and seaweed. These cliffs are home to large numbers of seabirds such as puffins, fulmars, kittiwakes, razorbills, guillemots, black guillemots, cormorants and shags, whilst the rocky islets and skerries are important for harbour seals. There are also beaches and sand dunes: the dunes at Achnahaird in particular support three plant species (petalworts, dune slack mosses matted bryum and sea bryum) that occur nowhere else in Scotland. There is relatively little machair in Wester Ross compared to other parts of western Scotland.

Whales, dolphins, porpoises and seals area frequently seen in the outer lochs and open waters, whilst the more sheltered sea lochs contain rocky reefs, maerl beds and deep mud banks. Loch Carron is home to the world's largest flame shell beds.

The rivers and lochs of Wester Ross support important populations of Atlantic salmon and sea trout, although numbers of adult fish have declined in recent years. Freshwater pearl mussels live in the gravel beds of clean, fast flowing rivers: the population had declined across Europe as a result of pollution, habitat changes and pearl fishing, and the Wester Ross population is now of international importance. Otters and water voles are both present in strong numbers in the rivers of Wester Ross: water voles populations have been in decline across Great Britain due to predation by non-native American mink, which have only recently been recorded in Wester Ross. The lochs also support internationally important concentrations of breeding black-throated divers, which is at the southern edge of its range in Wester Ross. Besides salmon and trout, Arctic charr can be found in many of the lochs.

There are areas of Caledonian pinewood at Shieldaig, Coulin, Torridon, Beinn Eighe, Rhidorroch, Achnashellach and the islands on Loch Maree. Though small in terms of area, these pinewoods (which are composed chiefly of Scots pine, alongside deciduous species such as birch and rowan) are an internationally important habitat. These woods are genetically distinct from the pinewoods of central and eastern Scotland, and support a highly specialised flora and fauna including rare mosses and lichens, and insects such as the Scottish wood ant. The pinewoods are also habitats for red squirrel and black grouse.

Pollen analysis suggests the planting of oak on the alluvial land at Morvich in the middle of the fifth century, at a location where the species had not grown naturally for two millennia. The mature trees appear to have been clear-felled in a single act towards the end of the sixth century.

Moorland habitats, which are rare globally, are quite common in Wester Ross. The moors are characterised by blanket bogs composed of sphagnum mosses, and host breeding birds such as golden plover, greenshank and dunlin, along with a resident population of red grouse. The summits of Wester Ross host alpine and sub-alpine heaths comprising mosses, liverworts and lichens, and dwarf shrubs such as alpine bearberry, juniper, crowberry, and cowberry. Beinn Eighe is the only known site for the Northern prongwort in the UK, and represents 75% of the known world population. Bird species in the montane areas of Wester Ross include ptarmigan, dotterel and snow bunting, along with raptor species such as golden eagle and merlin.

White-tailed eagles were reintroduced into Wester Ross during the 1990s, with 58 birds being released between 1993 and 1998. This was the second phase of the reintroduction of white-tailed eagles into Scotland, following on from the release of 82 birds on Rùm between 1975 and 1985. As of 2014, it was estimated that there were 98 breeding pairs living along the west coast of Scotland.

== Conservation designations ==
The Wester Ross National Scenic Area covers 1635 km^{2} of countryside and seascape, and is the largest of the national scenic areas in terms of land area (1439 km^{2}). It extends from Loch Kishorn in the south to Little Loch Broom in the north. There are two further national scenic areas (NSA) that include parts of Wester Ross: the Kintail NSA and the Coigach portion of the Assynt-Coigach NSA.

Wester Ross was designated as a Biosphere Reserve in April 2016. The designated area is subdivided into three zones:

- A Core Zone of 53 km^{2}, coincident with two protected sites, the Beinn Eighe and Loch Maree Islands National Nature Reserve and the Coille Mhór Special Area of Conservation.
- A Buffer Zone of 138 km^{2} surrounding these two sites and including the entirety of the National Trust for Scotland's Balmacara property.
- A Transition Zone of 5108 km^{2} covering the rest of Wester Ross (including 955 km^{2} of sea).

Approximately 20% of Wester Ross is legally protected via the Site of Special Scientific Interest (SSSI) designation.

In 2014 59,900 hectares (599 km^{2}) of coastal waters in the northern part of Wester Ross (from Rubha Rèidh to Coigach) was declared a Nature Conservation Marine Protected Area (NCMPA).

=== National Trust for Scotland properties ===
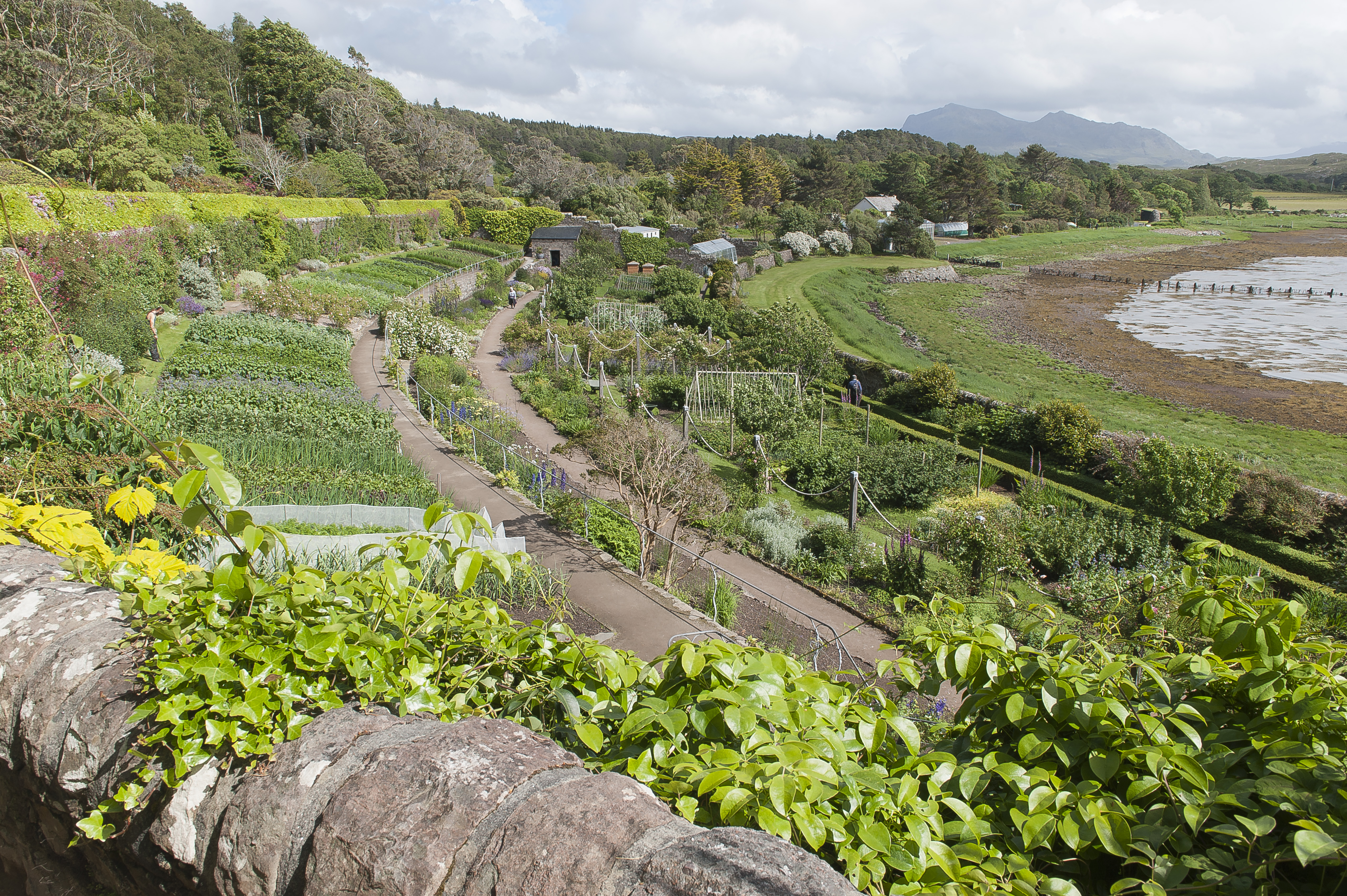
Inverewe Garden

The National Trust for Scotland, a charity that cares for sites of historic or natural significance, owns seven properties in Wester Ross:

- The 7,050 ha (17,422 acres) Kintail and Falls of Glomach Estate covers the mountains on the north side of Glen Shiel, including the "Five Sisters of Kintail" and the Falls of Glomach. The Falls became a Trust property in 1941, whilst the wider Kintail Estate entered Trust ownership in 1944. The estate is adjacent to the Trust's West Affric Estate in Inverness-shire.
- The Balmacara estate, which became a Trust property in 1946, is a 2,277 ha (5,627 acres) crofting estate covering the land surrounding Plockton.
- The ruins of Strome Castle, situated on a rocky promontory in Loch Carron, have been a Trust property since 1939.
- Shieldaig Island, lying offshore from the village of Shieldaig, is entirely covered in Scots pine trees, and was purchased by the Trust in 1970.
- The 6,457 ha (15,955 acres) Torridon Estate covers the mountains on the north side of Glen Torridon, including Beinn Alligin, Liathach and part of Beinn Eighe, and has been a Trust property since 1967.
- Inverewe Garden, which has been a Trust property since 1952, was first established by Osgood Mackenzie and brings together exotic plants from around the world. The garden forms part of a wider estate, covering 839 ha (2,074 acres) in total, all of which is under Trust ownership.
- Corrieshalloch Gorge is a national nature reserve located between Ullapool and Dundonnell, which has been a National Trust property since 1945. The chief attraction is the Falls of Meanach, which can be seen from a Victorian suspension bridge and viewing platform.

== Demographics ==
The population of Wester Ross (Note: Wester Ross being defined as the civil parishes of Applecross, Gairloch, Glenshiel, Kintail, Lochalsh, Lochbroom and Lochcarron, i.e. all parishes in Ross and Cromarty with coastline on the western side of the county including Lochalsh.) was 8701 according to the 2011 census of Scotland, showing a slight increase compared to 8491 in 1991. The population is generally older than Scotland as a whole, with 22.1% being aged 65 or older, compared to 16.8% for Scotland as a whole. The area is sparsely populated, having one of the lowest population densities in Europe, with just 1.6 people per km^{2}.

Wester Ross has historically been a Gaelic-speaking area; however, the language suffered from persecution for many years, and its decline was hastened when English-language schooling became compulsory in the late 19th century. In the 2011 census 10.6% of the population reported being able to speak the language, compared to only 1.1% of the population of Scotland as whole. As well as being a spoken language Gaelic culture continues to be important in the area through traditional music and ceilidhs.

== Government and politics ==
Wester Ross is part of the registration county of Ross and Cromarty. The counties of Scotland are now used only for statistical purposes, and for local government purposes the whole of Ross and Cromarty is part of the council area of Highland. Wester Ross is united with Strathpeffer in Easter Ross to form a single ward entitled Wester Ross, Strathpeffer and Lochalsh, which elects 4 councilors to Highland Council under the single transferable vote electoral system. Some local decisions are delegated to the Wester Ross, Strathpeffer and Lochalsh Committee, which consists of all councilors representing this ward.

In the Scottish Parliament most of Wester Ross lies within the Caithness, Sutherland and Ross constituency, however the Lochalsh area in the south of the region forms part of the Skye, Lochaber and Badenoch constituency. Each constituency elects one Member of the Scottish Parliament (MSP) by the plurality (first past the post) method of election; a further seven additional members are elected from the Highlands and Islands electoral region (in addition to the eight constituency MSPs), to produce a form of proportional representation for the region as a whole.

At Westminster Wester Ross is represented as part of the Inverness, Skye and West Ross-shire constituency, which elects one Member of Parliament (MP) by the first past the post system of election.

== In popular culture ==
Wester Ross is featured in the lyrics to the song "Letter from America" by The Proclaimers, and "Kishorn Commandos" by North Sea Gas, which relate the wild lifestyle of construction workers on the Ninian Central Platform in Kishorn. Many other songs refer to or are named after areas, geographical features and villages of Wester Ross, notably Loch Maree Islands, which has been recorded by many artists including Calum Kennedy.

Major outdoor scenes in the films Stardust and The Eagle (based on Rosemary Sutcliff's book The Eagle of the Ninth) were shot in Wester Ross. Plockton was used for shots showing Sergeant Neil Howie's arrival at Summerisle in The Wicker Man. The 2014 film What We Did on Our Holiday starring David Tennant, Rosamund Pike, and Billy Connolly, was filmed in Wester Ross and featured the Salmon Beach and Redpoint.

Wester Ross is the location for the adventures of John Macnab in the book by John Buchan.

American author George R. R. Martin took the name of the fictional continent in his epic fantasy franchise A Song of Ice and Fire, Westeros, from Wester Ross.

== Places in Wester Ross ==
- Lochcarron
- Kishorn
- Applecross
- Shieldaig
- Torridon
- Kinlochewe
- Gairloch
- Poolewe
- Aultbea
- Laide
- Dundonnell
- Scoraig
- Ullapool
- Achiltibuie
- Inverasdale

== See also ==
- Easter Ross
- Little Gruinard
- Ross and Cromarty
- Ross-shire
- Ross, Scotland

== Notes ==
=== Bibliography ===
- "Wester Ross Biosphere Reserve Application" (PDF). Wester Ross Biosphere Ltd. September 2015.
- "Scotland's Census". National Records of Scotland.

== Gallery ==
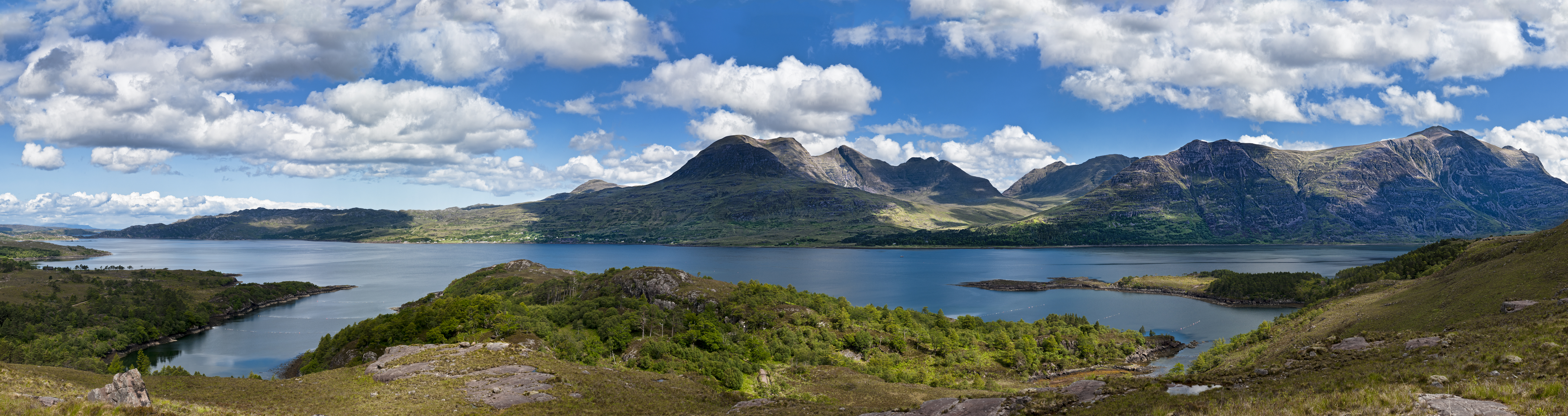
Upper Loch Torridon from the A896. June 2011

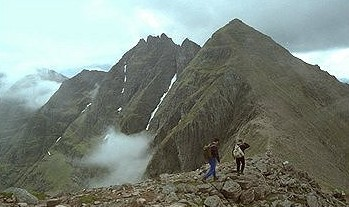
Sgurr Fiona and the Corrag Bhuidhe pinnacles on An Teallach.

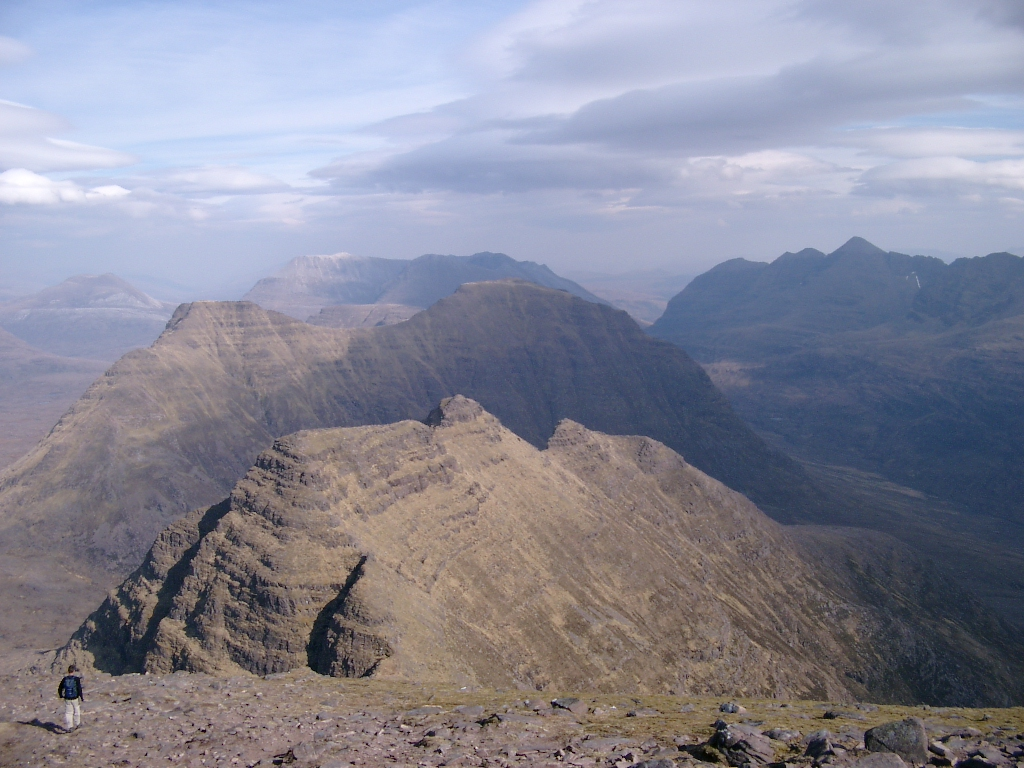
View east from Sgurr Mhòr over the "Horns" of Beinn Alligin.

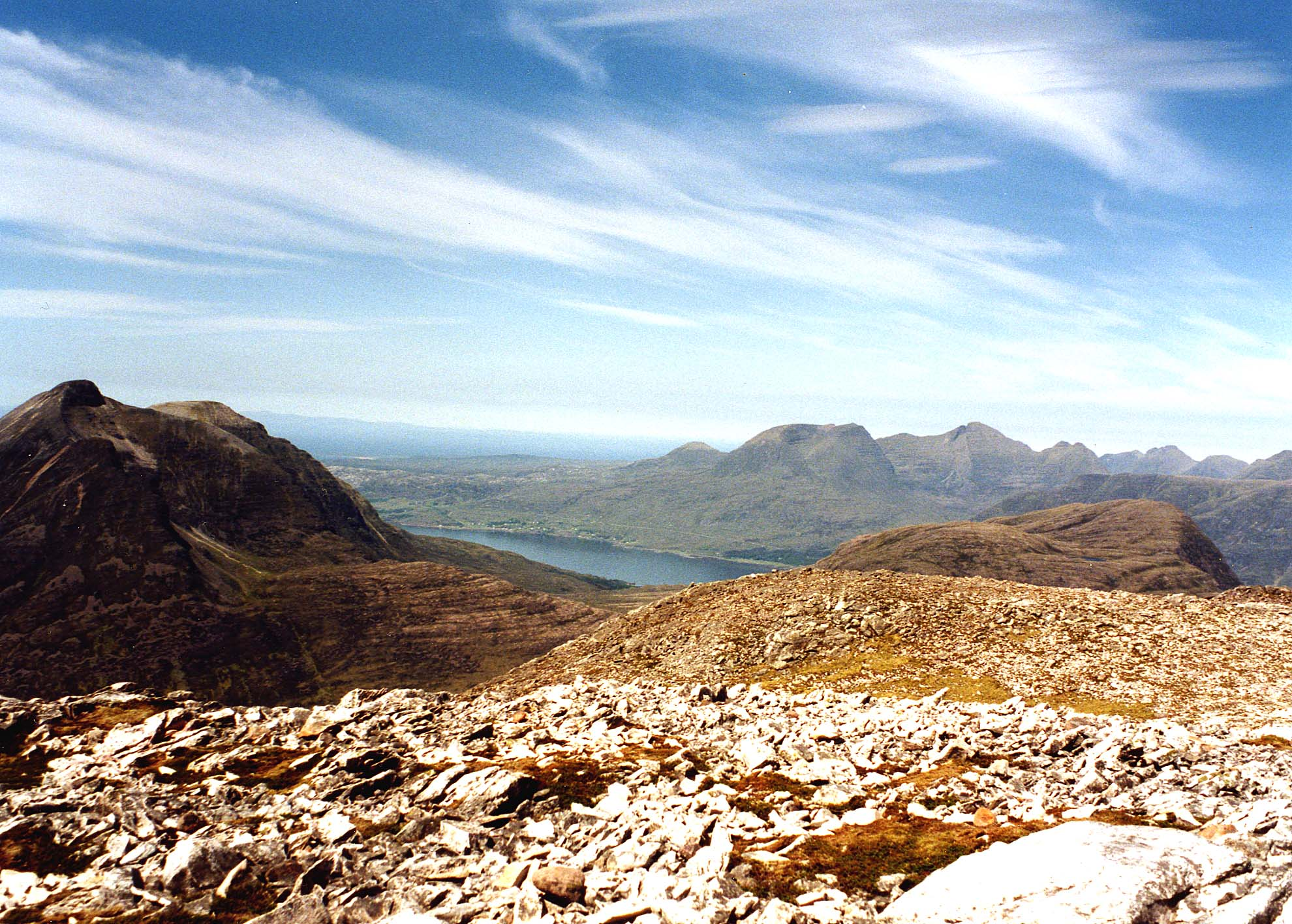
The view north west from the summit of An Ruadh-stac takes in Beinn Damh, Upper Loch Torridon and Beinn Alligin.

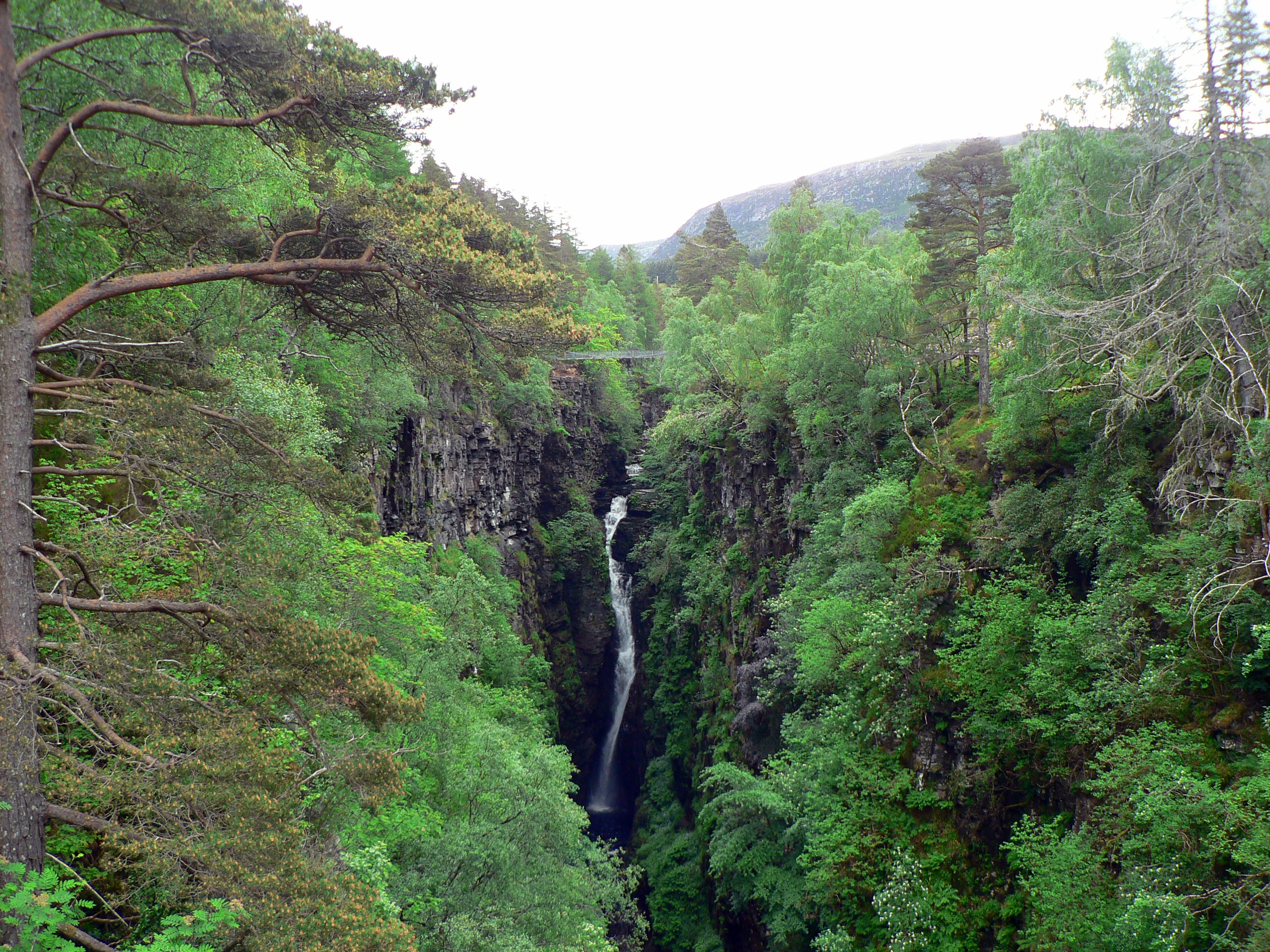
Corrieshalloch Gorge.

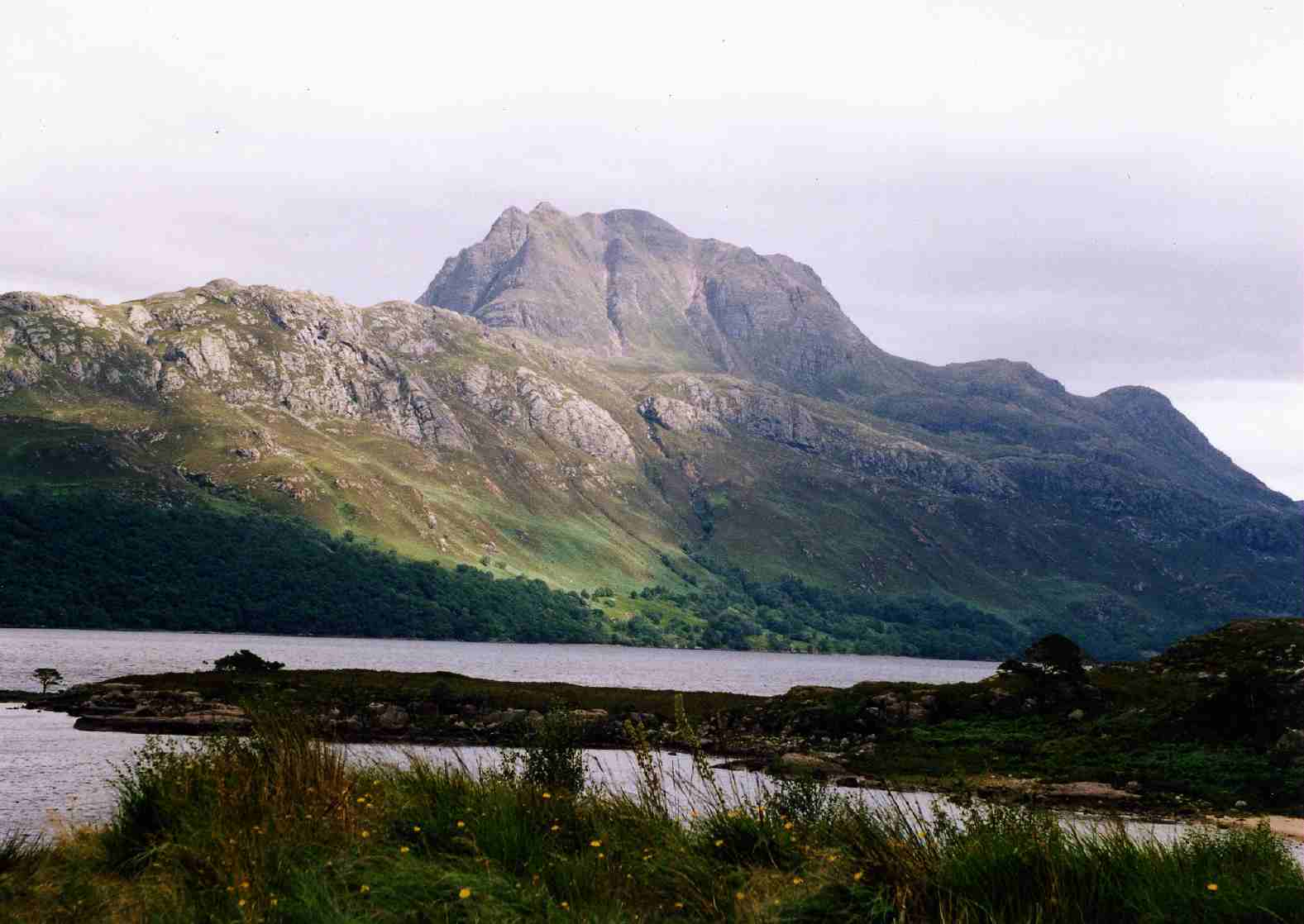
Slioch seen from the shores of Loch Maree.
