= Dundonnell and Fisherfield Forest =

Coordinates: 57°46′N 5°20′W

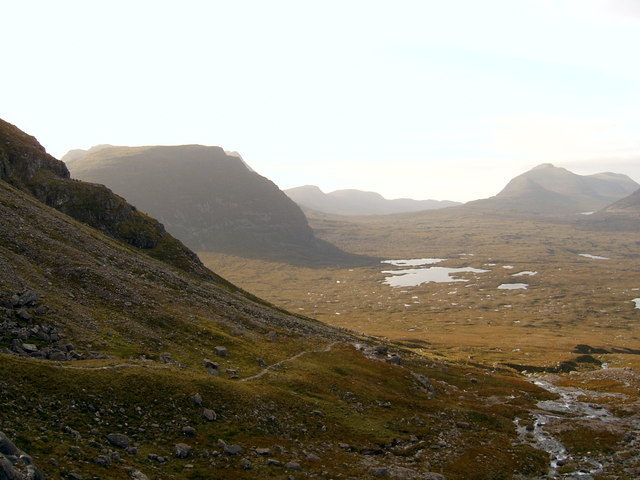
Fisherfield Forest

The Dundonnell and Fisherfield Forest covers a large mountainous area of Wester Ross in the Northwest Highlands of Scotland, lying between Loch Maree and Little Loch Broom. It is sometimes nicknamed The Great Wilderness, as the area is entirely devoid of permanent settlements.

Although termed a forest the area has very few trees. It is in fact a deer forest; an area maintained by the owners primarily for deer stalking. Three estates cover the principal area of the forest. Dundonnell Estate (134 km^{2}) covers the northwest part of the forest, including the northwestern flanks of An Teallach, whilst Eilean Darach estate covers 262 km^{2} in the northeast, including the northeast flank of An Teallach. The plurality of the area, including all the southern and central sections, forms the 323 km^{2} Letterewe estate.

== Mountains ==
Three of the most famous mountains in the area are An Teallach, which lies to the southwest of Dundonnell, A' Mhaighdean, which rises northwest of Lochan Fada, and Slioch, which rises north of Loch Maree, near Kinlochewe. There is a bothy at Shenavall, and it is used occasionally by hill walkers crossing the area or to climb An Teallach.

== Lochs and rivers ==
Fionn Loch is the largest in the forest proper. Other lochs include Loch na Sealga, Lochan Fada and Loch a' Bhraoin.

Rivers in the forest include the Dundonnell River, Gruinard River, Little Gruinard River and Uisge Toll a' Mhadaidh.

== See also ==
- Little Gruinard
