= A832 road =

Road in Scotland

Coordinates: 57.63148°N 4.74352°W

A832

Route information
- Length: 126 mi (203 km)

Major junctions
- From: Cromarty
- A9 A835 A862 A834 A890 A896

- To: A835 near Ullapool

Location
- Country: United Kingdom
- Constituent country: Scotland

Road network
- Roads in the United Kingdom; Motorways; A and B road zones

The A832 is a road in the Scottish Highlands, linking Cromarty, on the east coast, to Gairloch on the west coast, and beyond Gairloch to Braemore Junction. It is 126 miles (203 km) long and runs entirely in the former county of Ross and Cromarty. The road forms part of the Wester Ross Coastal Trail.

== Cromarty to Gorstan ==
Starting in Cromarty on the Black Isle, the A832 travels south alongside the Moray Firth to Fortrose, then turns west, heading inland. It crosses the A9 and A835 at Tore and continues to Muir of Ord, passing near to the Beauly Firth.

Five miles after Muir of Ord, the A832 meets the A835 again at a T-junction, and turning left, multiplexes with the A835 for nine miles (14 km) to Gorstan. On this stretch it passes Contin, the Rogie Falls and Loch Garve.

== Gorstan to Gairloch ==
At Gorstan the A832 and A835 diverge again. They meet again later on at Braemore Junction, where the A832 terminates at the A835. From Gorstan to Braemore Junction on the A835 is 20 miles (32 km), however on the A832 it is a vast 87-mile (140 km) circuit to the west coast and around the mountains of Wester Ross.

From Gorstan the A832 heads west along Strath Bran to Achnasheen, alongside the Dingwall and Skye Railway. At Achnasheen the A890 branches off to the south to Loch Carron, following the railway. The A832 continues west, passing by Loch a' Chroisg and over a low mountain pass 815 ft (248 m) to descend Glen Docherty to Kinlochewe. Until recently, this 9-mile (14 km) stretch was a single track road with passing places, but in recent years the road was upgraded to two lanes.

At Kinlochewe, there is a junction with the A896, which heads west through Glen Torridon. The A832 continues north west, beneath Beinn Eighe and along the shore of Loch Maree, with views of Slioch on the opposite shore. After diverging from Loch Maree it climbs through Slattadale, and there is another short single-track stretch as the A832 descends Kerrydale to Gair Loch.

== Gairloch to Dundonnell ==
After reaching the west coast at Gair Loch, the A832 follows the coast northwards, gradually making a turn back towards the south-east. It circuits the Dundonnell and Fisherfield Forest, a vast mountain wilderness region between Loch Maree and Little Loch Broom.

At Loch Gairloch, the A832 turns north through the village of Gairloch, then turns east and crosses the headland between Loch Gairloch and Loch Ewe. It descends to the latter at Poolewe and follows its coast northwards to Drumchork, passing Inverewe Garden. At Drumchork the road rises again, crossing a headland to Gruinard Bay.

After following the coast of Gruinard Bay the road crosses one more headland and descends to Little Loch Broom, now travelling south-eastwards. It continues past the end of the loch, and along the Strath Beag valley through the village of Dundonnell.

Improvements to the road to Gairloch were completed in 2022.

== Dundonnell to Braemore Junction ==
This stretch of road is one of several to be known as the Destitution Road. It was built during the Highland Potato Famine of 1846–1847, to provide employment for crofters in exchange for oatmeal rations.

Beyond Dundonnell, the A832 enters the Dundonnell Gorge and begins climbing alongside several waterfalls on the Dundonnell River. The road leaves the top of the gorge at Fain Bridge and continues across the open moors to the summit at an altitude of 332 metres (1,089 ft), surrounded by the towering peaks of An Teallach, Sgurr nan Clach Geala and Beinn Dearg.

On its final stretch, the road descends alongside the Abhainn Cuileig river, then turns alongside the Corrieshalloch Gorge. There is a car park here, with footpath access to the top of the gorge and the Falls of Measach.

Shortly after passing the gorge, the A832 terminates at Braemore Junction on the A835.
