= Slioch =

Mountain in Scotland

Coordinates: 57.66469°N 5.34796°W

- Scottish Gaelic: An t-Sleaghach
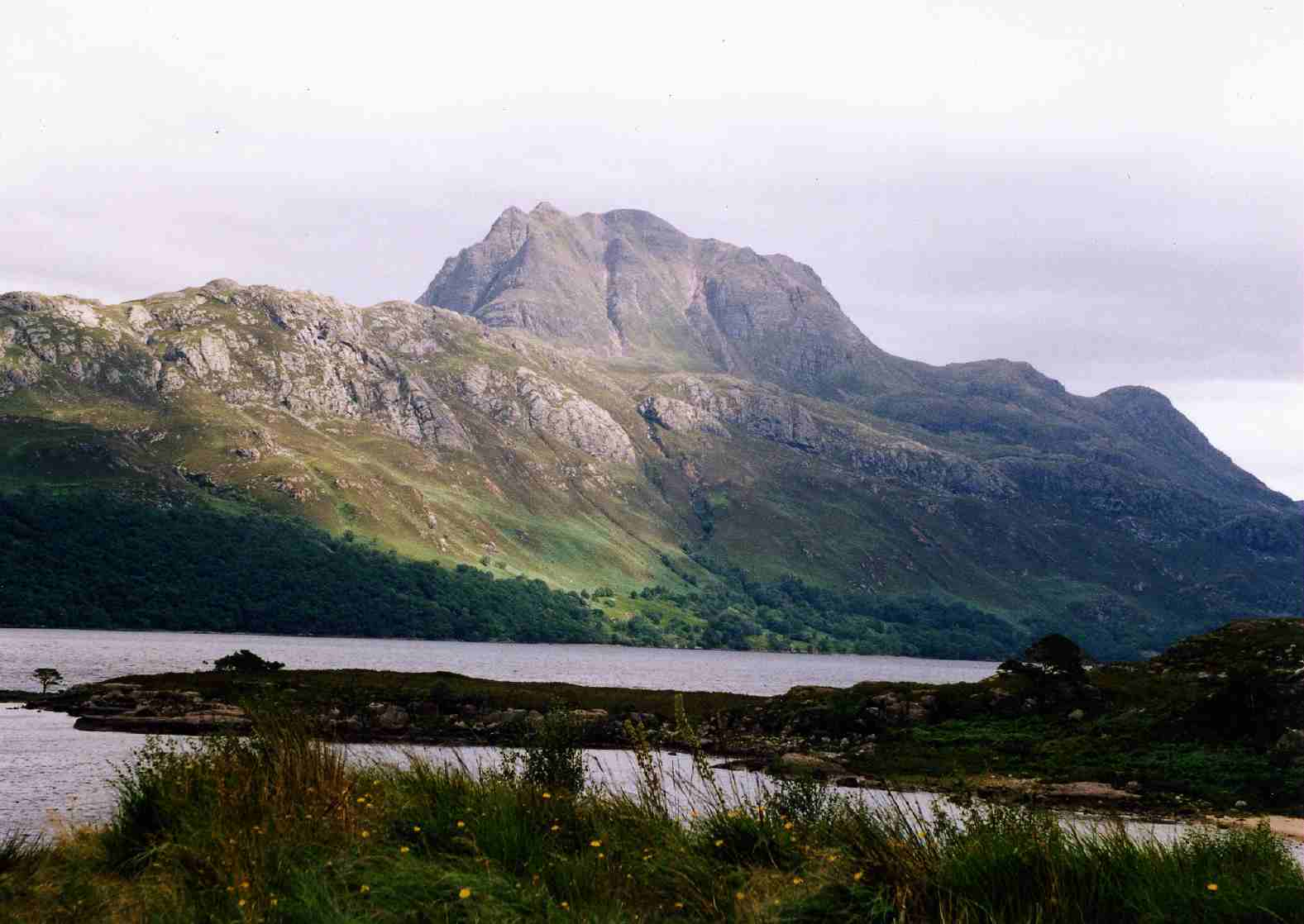
- Slioch seen from the shores of Loch Maree.

Highest point
- Elevation: 981 m (3,219 ft)
- Prominence: 626 m (2,054 ft)
- Parent peak: Sgurr Mor
- Listing: Munro, Marilyn

Naming
- English translation: the spear
- Language of name: Gaelic
- Pronunciation: English: /ˈsliːɒx/ Scottish Gaelic: [ˈʃlɤ.əx]

Geography
- Location: Wester Ross, Scotland
- OS grid: NH004688
- Topo map: OS Landranger 19, OS Explorers 433, 435

Slioch (Scottish Gaelic: An t-Sleaghach) is a mountain in the Scottish Highlands situated in Wester Ross, eight kilometres north of the village of Kinlochewe. Slioch reaches an elevation of 981 metres (3,219 feet) and towers above the southeastern end of Loch Maree to give one of the best known and most photographed sights (from the A832 road) in the Highlands. VisitScotland, the Scottish national tourist agency, has used video footage of Slioch in its television advertisements.

The mountain is composed of Torridonian sandstone on a base of Lewisian Gneiss. It has steep crags on three sides, allowing easy access for the walker only from the southeast, where the large open corrie of Coire na Sleaghaich has two ridges on its flanks which the walker can use. The mountain's name comes from the Gaelic word "sleagh" and means "the spear" and this only becomes obvious when Slioch is viewed from Lochan Fada to the northeast, from here the subsidiary top of Sgùrr an Tuill Bhàin (The Peak of the White Hollow) (933 metres) dominates as a slender peak and gives the mountain its name. Feral goats are often seen on the mountain.

== Ascent ==
Slioch is climbed almost exclusively from Incheril, one kilometre east of Kinlochewe. Starting from here involves a flat five kilometre approach walk northwest along the banks of the Kinlochewe River and Loch Maree before any climbing begins. An impressive 100-metre-high (330 ft) waterfall is passed as it comes down off Beinn a’ Mhuinidh to join the river. When the foot of Gleann Bianasdail is reached the climbing begins: it is a one-kilometre walk up the glen to a path that goes left and heads for Coire na Sleaghaich and then up the south east ridge of Slioch passing two small lochans, known to many as the 'twin lochans', to reach the summit of the mountain. The return journey can be varied by taking in the subsidiary top of Sgurr an Tuill Bhain and then descending south into the corrie to join the uphill route.

The summit has twin pinnacles: the southern top has a trig point with a height of 980 metres whilst the northern top is situated on the edge of the cliffs and is a finer viewpoint. In recent years it has been elevated to a height of 981 metres by the Ordnance Survey making it the highest point on the mountain. Slioch's isolation from other mountains makes the view from the summit extensive; it takes in the wilderness of the Fisherfield Forest to the north with its five Munros. The Torridon mountains and Loch Maree are also well seen.

Slioch is unusual in being bounded on three sides by waters flowing southeast (Lochan Fada), then southwest (Gleann Bianasdail) and finally northwest (Loch Maree). Ordnance Survey maps show Lochan Fada as having two outlets at its south-east end, the second being via Gleann na Muice to Kinlochewe and Loch Maree. Google Earth however shows no watercourse between the two ribbon lochans at the head of Allt Gleann na Muice, confirmed by its satellite elevation data, and by Bartholomew's Map

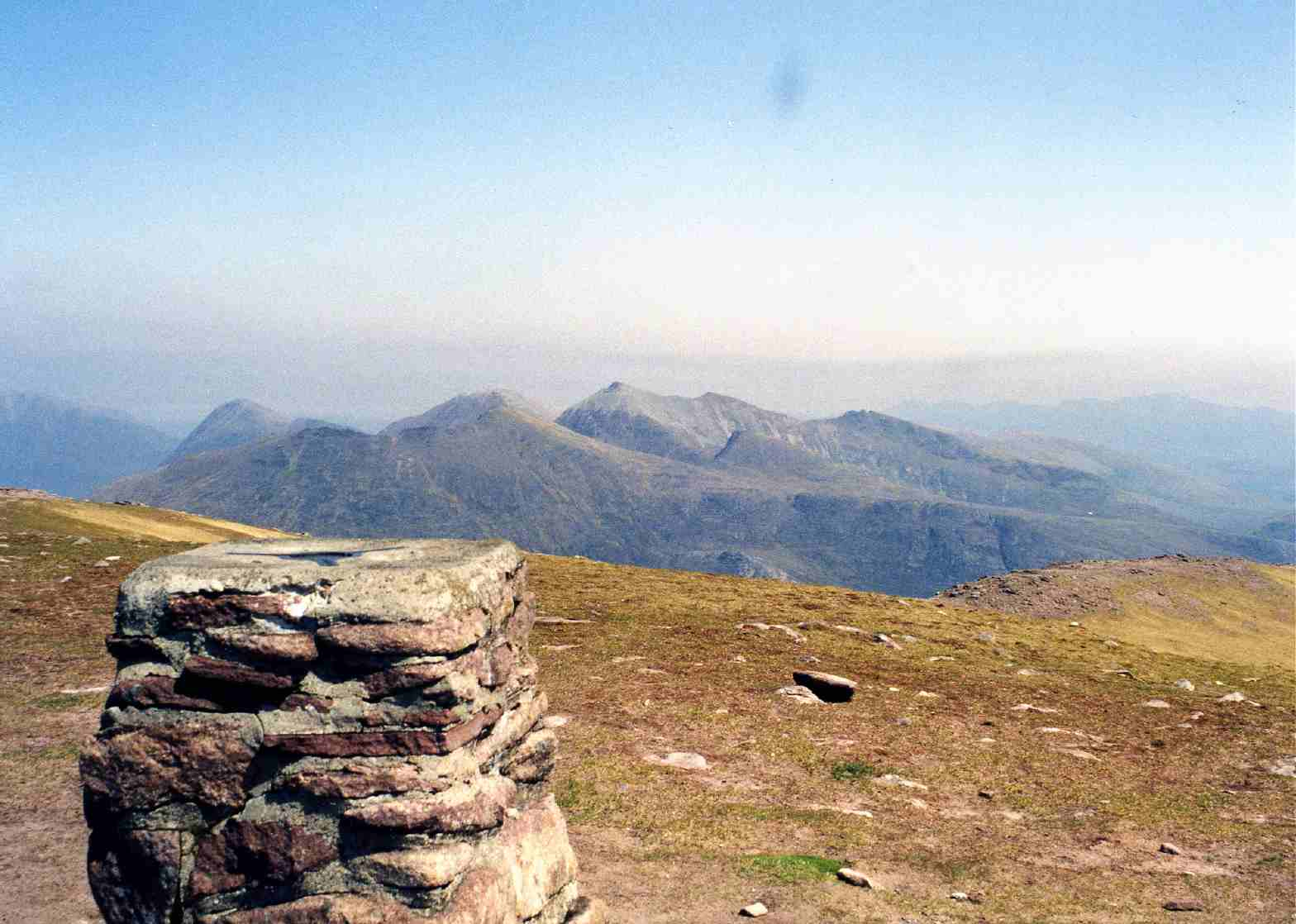
The Fisherfield Munros from Slioch summit.
