= Beinn an Eoin (Torridon) =

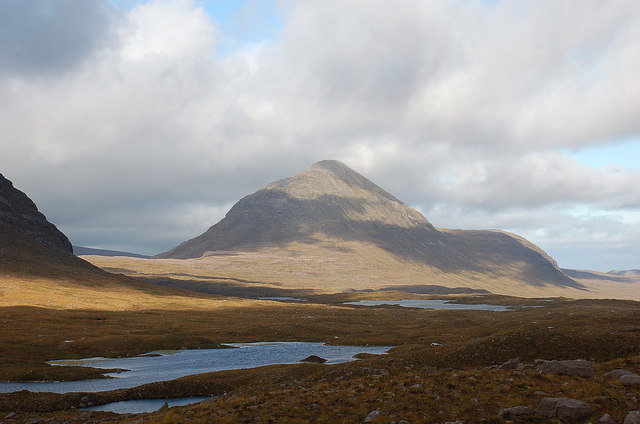
- Beinn an Eoin

Highest point
- Elevation: 855 m (2,805 ft)
- Prominence: 434 m (1,424 ft)
- Listing: Corbett, Marilyn
- Coordinates: 57°37′23″N 5°30′36″W

Geography
- Location: Wester Ross, Scotland
- Parent range: Northwest Highlands
- OS grid: NG905646
- Topo map: OS Landranger 19

Beinn an Eoin (855 m) is a mountain in the Northwest Highlands, Scotland. It lies in the remote Torridon Hills in Wester Ross, south of the village of Gairloch.
