= Corrieshalloch Gorge =

Gorge in the Scottish Highlands

Corrieshalloch Gorge National Nature Reserve
- IUCN category III (natural monument or feature)
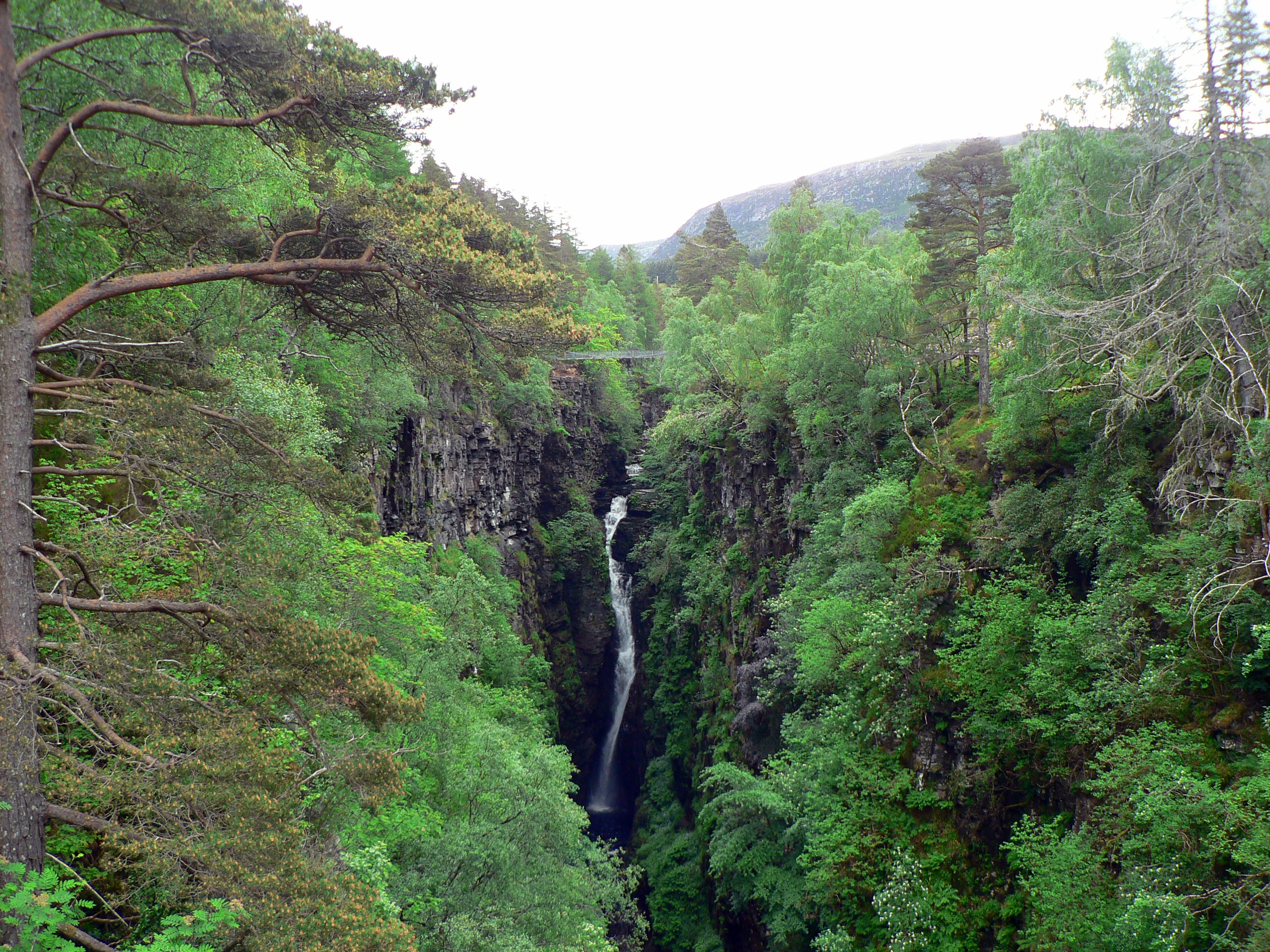
- Corrieshalloch Gorge and Falls of Measach

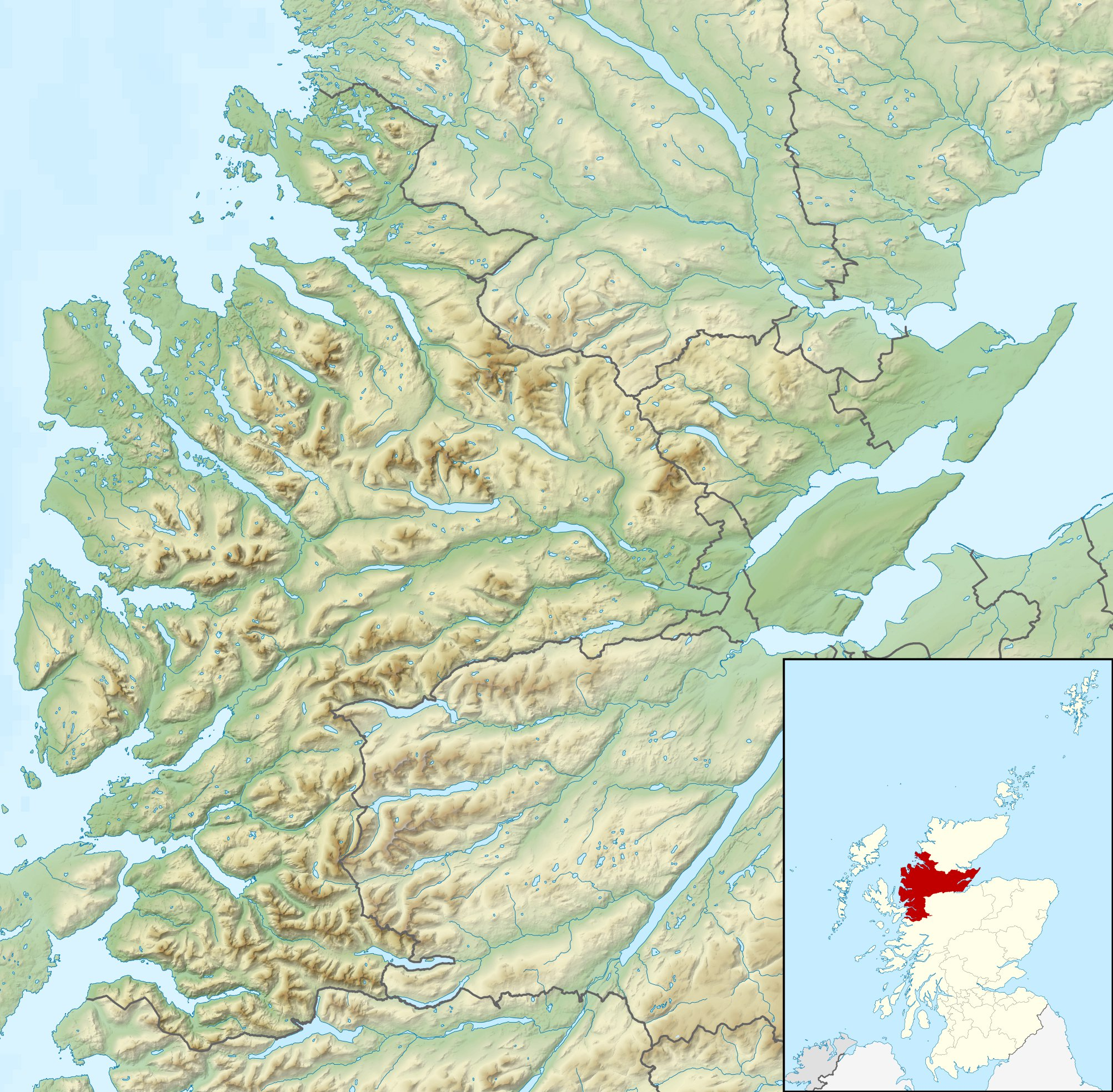
- Location within Ross and Cromarty
- Location: Ullapool, Scotland
- Coordinates: 57.7552°N 5.0204°W
- Area: 7 ha (17 acres)
- Designation: NatureScot
- Established: 1967
- Owner: National Trust for Scotland
- Website: Corrieshalloch Gorge National Nature Reserve

Viewing platform at Corrieshalloch Gorge

Corrieshalloch Gorge (Scottish Gaelic: Coire Shalach, meaning unattractive corrie) is a gorge situated about 20 kilometres (12 mi) south of Ullapool, close to the junction of the A832 and A835 roads near Braemore in the Scottish Highlands. The gorge is approximately 1.5 km (0.93 mi) long, 60 metres (200 ft) deep, and 10 m (33 ft) wide at its lip. The Abhainn Droma flows through Corrieshalloch, below which the landscape opens out into a broad, flat-bottomed glacial trough at the head of Loch Broom.

The 46-metre (151 ft) high Falls of Measach (Gaelic: Easan na Miasaich, meaning waterfalls of the place of platters, with reference to the pot-holes worn by the action of the water) can be viewed from a viewing platform and a Victorian suspension footbridge. The gorge has been owned since 1945 by the National Trust for Scotland who manage it and the surrounding area jointly with NatureScot.

== Formation ==
Corrieshalloch Gorge is one of the most spectacular gorges in Scotland, and demonstrates how erosion resulting from the rapid melting of glaciers that lead to the formation of deep gorges. The gorge formed at the end of the Quaternary ice age around 10–13,000 years, as the meltwater from ice sheets that covered northern Scotland between 2.6 million and 11,500 years ago exploited existing lines of weakness in the Moine bedrock.

== Visitor facilities ==
A 25-metre (82 ft) long footbridge spans the gorge below the falls. The bridge was constructed by Sir John Fowler, who was also one of the designers of the Forth Bridge. Access to the footbridge is via a 300-metre (980 ft) long path from the car park on the south side of the gorge. There is a charge of £2 payable for parking using an honesty box at the start of the path. A viewing platform has been installed which projects out into the gorge.

The bridge was closed to the public in 2010 following the discovery of unacceptable wear and tear, but was reopened in January 2011 after temporary repair work. It was closed again in the winter of 2011/12 for longer term repairs. Shortly before it was due to be reopened in April 2012, consulting engineers discovered cracks in several deck support hangers, and the entire site, including gorge-side paths, was closed until these could be replaced. It fully re-opened in late May 2012 after refurbishment and repairs were completed, however as of 2018 the Trust recommend that no more than six people use the bridge at any one time.

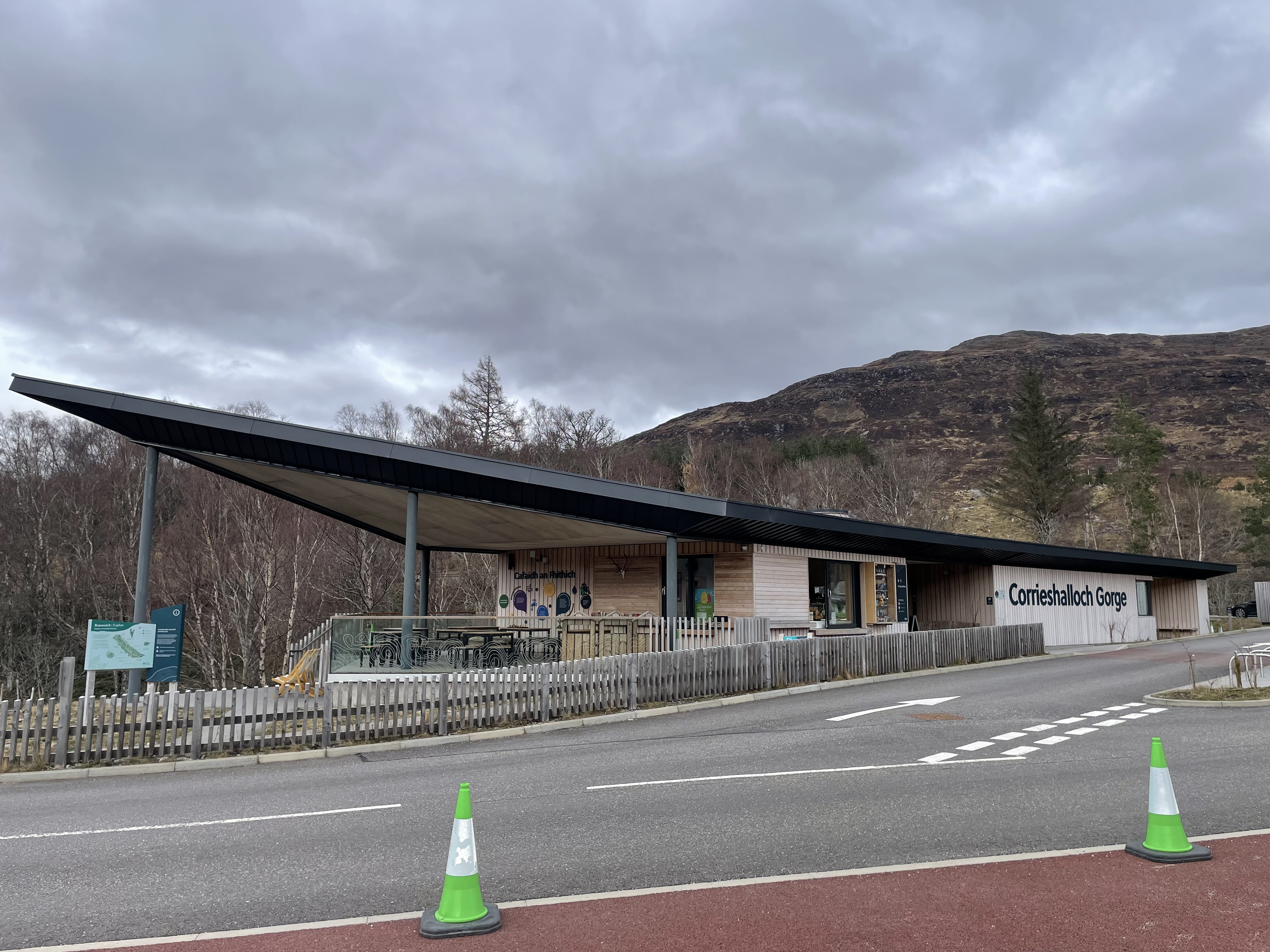
Visitor centre against mountain backdrop

In December 2019, a £2.3 million investment in upgraded parking and a visitor centre was announced. The centre opened in 2023.

== Nature and conservation ==
The gorge provides a habitat for plants that have largely disappeared from the surrounding areas due to grazing pressures. The dark, humid walls of the gorge support ferns, feather mosses and sanicle; wood millet, a plant otherwise rare in northwest Scotland. Higher up, the more sunlit slopes support trees such as wych elm, birch, sycamore, Norway maple and beech.

The wooded parts of the gorge support a population of the cranefly species Lipsothrix ecucullata, which is nationally rare. The larvae of this species inhabit wet, decayed wood, whilst the mature adults inhabit damp deciduous woodlands.

Corrieshalloch Gorge is a national nature reserve (NNR) and a Site of Special Scientific Interest (SSSI), and is classified as a Category III protected area by the International Union for Conservation of Nature. It is the smallest of Scotland's 43 national nature reserves.

The gorge is suffering small-scale invasion by aggressive alien plant species (rhododendron and Japanese knotweed), and specialist access to the gorge walls and floor is being deployed to control it.
