= An Teallach =

Mountain group in Scotland

Coordinates: 57.80653°N 5.25166°W

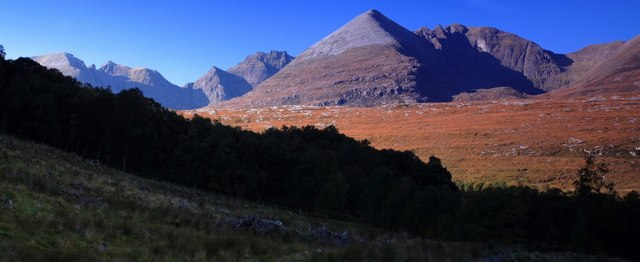

Highest point
- Elevation: 1,062.5 m (3,486 ft)
- Prominence: 757 m
- Parent peak: Sgurr Mor
- Listing: Munro (2), Marilyn

Naming
- English translation: the forge/the anvil
- Language of name: Scottish Gaelic
- Pronunciation: Scottish Gaelic: [əɲˈtʰʲal̪ˠəx] English approximation: ən-CHAL-əkh

Geography
- Location: Wester Ross, Scotland
- Parent range: Northwest Highlands
- OS grid: NH069843
- Topo map: OS Landranger 19

An Teallach (Scottish Gaelic for 'the forge' or 'the anvil') is a mountain group in Wester Ross, in the Northwest Highlands of Scotland. It lies west of Dundonnell Forest, north of Loch na Sealga, and south of Little Loch Broom. Its highest peaks are the Munros of Bidean a' Ghlas Thuill at 1062 m (3484 ft), and Sgùrr Fiona at 1058 m (3473 ft).

The mountains are mostly made of Torridonian sandstone. Like the peaks around Torridon (for which the rock is named), An Teallach has terraced sides riven with steep gullies and a sharp rocky summit crest at Sgùrr Fiona. The steepest section, known as Corrag Bhuidhe, rises above Loch Toll an Lochain. Corrag Bhuidhe's most spectacular feature is an overhanging pinnacle known as Lord Berkeley's Seat.

== Etymology ==
Teallach usually means a forge or hearth, but can also mean an anvil. It is suggested that the name came from the shape and colour of the mountains, along with smoke-like mist wreathing the pinnacles. Another suggestion is that tinkers had set up a forge in one of the mountain corries, or that a forge sat near the feet of the mountains (now a mountaineering club hut called the Old Smiddy).

== Summits ==
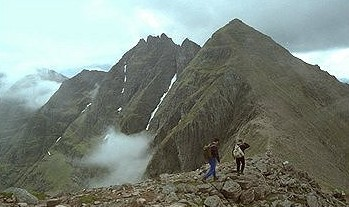
Sgùrr Fiona and the Corrag Bhuidhe pinnacles, An Teallach

An Teallach is a complex mountain massif, with ten distinct summits over 3,000 feet (914.4 m). From 1891 to 1981, only the highest of these, Bidean a' Ghlas Thuill, had the status of a Munro – a separate mountain over 3,000 feet. In 1981 the Scottish Mountaineering Club granted Munro status to Sgùrr Fiona, in recognition of its considerable topographic prominence (142 m) and distinct nature. The complete list of Munros and Tops (subsidiary summits appearing on Munro's Tables) is now as follows:

- Bidean a' Ghlas Thuill 1062 m (3484 ft)
  - Glas Mheall Mòr 979 m (3212 ft)
  - Glas Mheall Liath 960 m (3150 ft)
- Sgùrr Fiona 1058.6 m (3473 ft)
  - Corrag Bhuidhe 1040 m (3412 ft)
  - Lord Berkeley's Seat 1030 m (3379 ft)
  - Sgurr Creag an Eich 1017 m (3337 ft)
  - Stob Cadha Gobhlach 960 m (3150 ft)
  - Sàil Liath 954 m (3130 ft)
  - Corrag Bhuidhe Buttress 945 m (3100 ft) – deleted from Munro's Tables in 1997

== Ascent routes ==
The simplest route of ascent is probably that from Dundonnell, which follows a good path over rising ground to reach the northern summit, Bidein a' Ghlas Thuill, a distance of about 6 km (3 1/2 mi). From here the second summit, Sgurr Fiona, lies about 1 km (1/2 mi) to the southwest.

An alternative northern route heads up from Corrie Hallie, which lies about 4 km (2 1/2 mi) south of Dundonnell. This route, some 5 km (3 mi) in length, climbs steeply up the headwall of the corrie of Glas Tholl to reach the main ridge just north of Bidein a' Ghlas Thuill.

Both of the above routes, however, miss out the central section, for which An Teallach is best known. A route reaching the summits from the south starts from near Corrie Hallie. It then follows a track (later a path) southwest for about 5 km (3 mi). Then it breaks off to the north, climbing the southern end of the ridge via a subsidiary summit known as Sàil Liath. Heading northwest towards the Corrag Bhuidhe buttresses a choice must be made. One may either scramble over them directly (including the crossing of Lord Berkley's Seat), or take the bypass path on the southwest side. This path is eroded in some places and should not be regarded as an easy option.

The winter traverse of the ridge is probably more demanding than that of Liathach or the Aonach Eagach.
