= St Rufus Church =

Church in Keith, Moray, Scotland

Coordinates: 57.5437°N 2.9540°W

- Keith Parish Church
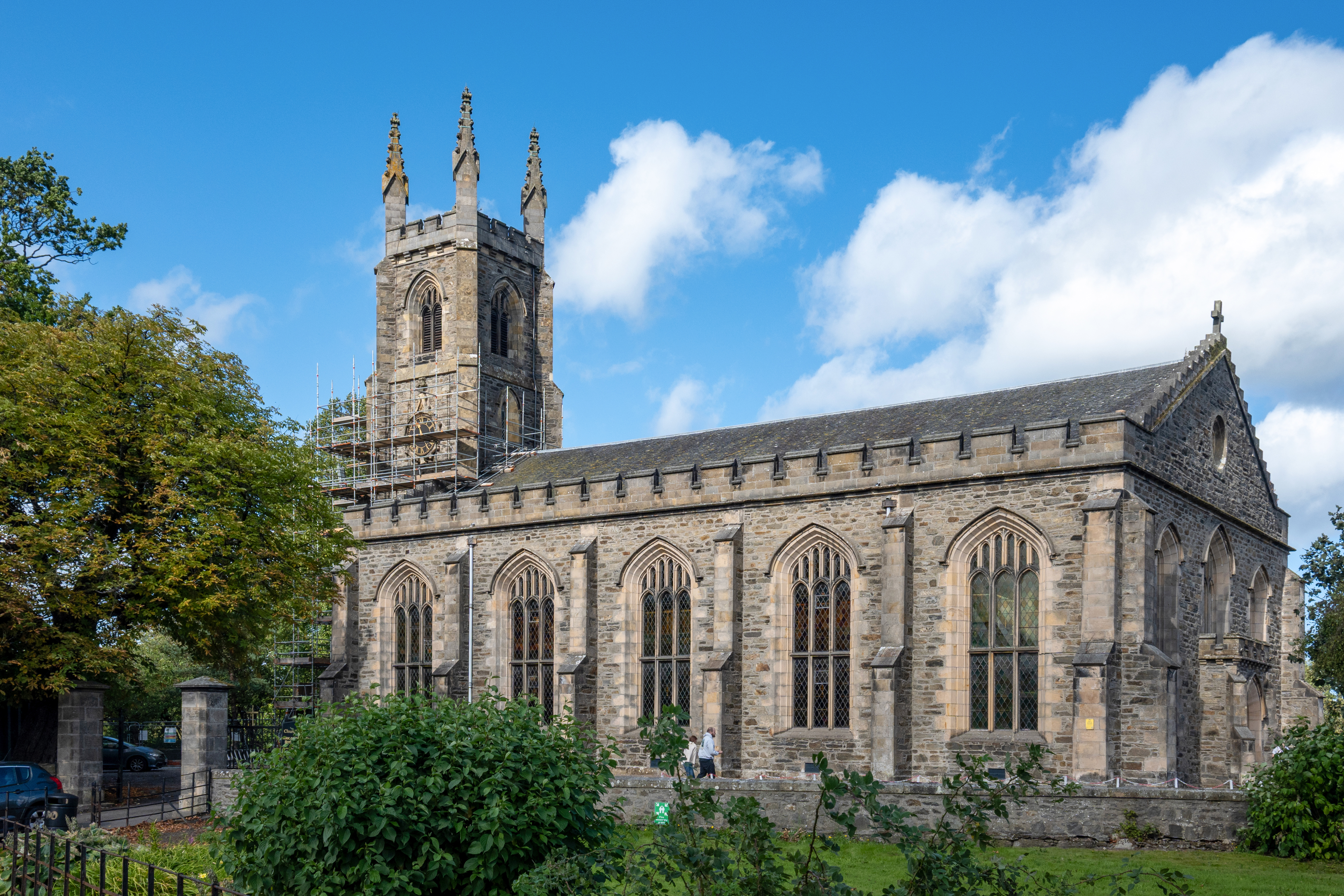

- Location within Moray
- Location: Keith, Moray
- Country: Scotland
- Denomination: Church of Scotland
- Website: www.strufus.org

History
- Status: Parish church
- Founded: 1816

Architecture
- Functional status: Active
- Heritage designation: Category A listed building

St Rufus Church, also known as Keith Parish Church, is a Church of Scotland church in Keith, Moray, that was built in 1816. Designed by James Gillespie Graham in the Perpendicular Gothic style, it has crenellated walls, traceried windows and a tall bell and clock tower at its west end. The doorway leading into the nave from the entrance lobby is an unusual war memorial, listing the names of parishioners who died in the First World War on one side, and in the Second World War on the other.

St Rufus was built to replace a medieval church of the same name, which was demolished shortly after St Rufus was completed. The sacrament house of the original church was installed in the new church, and now serves as a memorial to a church elder. St Rufus has been designated a Category A listed building, and is still in use as an active place of worship; the burial ground of the demolished church, which contains carved memorials to people from the 17th, 18th and 19th centuries, is Category B listed.

== History ==
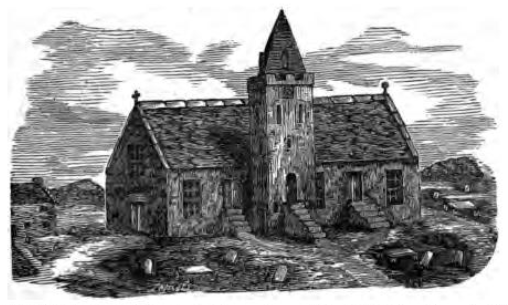
Illustration (c. 1798) of the original St Rufus Church in Old Keith

Christianity in Keith can be traced back to around 700 AD, when Máel Ruba, an Irish missionary monk, came to the area. Keith's old town, which ran along the east bank of the River Isla, was served by a medieval church that stood on a hill in the middle of old Keith. This original church was known as St Rufus, a latinised form of Máel Ruba.

Keith's charter was granted by William the Lion to Kinloss Abbey in the late 12th century, (Note: c. 1177 or 31 July 1195–96) and the original church was granted to Elgin Cathedral in 1203. James V is known to have lodged there while visiting Keith in 1497. The church was rebuilt in 1569, and was 100 feet (30 m) long and 28 feet (9 m) wide. When the nation underwent the Scottish Reformation in the 16th century, St Rufus changed from being a Roman Catholic church to become a part of the Church of Scotland, of which the current church is still a constituent. In 1609, the Keith Old Bridge across the River Isla was built on the north side of the original church. The church was described by 19th-century chronicles as "a capacious, though not very commodious building" and "a large awkward incommodious building" with low buttressed walls and an equal number of windows and doors. The steeple was used as a jail, and was lowered one story in 1797 to make room for a belfry.

By the 18th century, the Earl of Seafield and the Earl of Fife were two of the largest landholders in Old Keith. The old town had built up "in a very irregular and inconvenient manner", and around 1750, the Earl of Seafield began construction of a new village with a regular plan, called New Keith, to the southeast of Old Keith, on a hill that had previously been used for executions. According to a 19th-century chronicle, a "ferocious" rivalry arose between the residents of Old Keith and New Keith.

In 1816, the Earl of Fife began construction of a rival village across the River Isla, named Fife-Keith. The same year, construction began on a new, larger church in New Keith, designed by James Gillespie Graham, to replace the original parish church in Old Keith. Construction was completed in 1819, at a reported cost of £6,220 (equivalent to £401,988 in 2018). Within a year, the medieval church in Old Keith was abandoned and demolished. Little remains of the original St Rufus building aside from its platform and some fragments of walls, but a number of monuments from the 17th, 18th and 19th centuries survive in its graveyard, which is category B listed.

Situated on the north side of New Keith, the new church, which took its name from the original, has remained in use since its construction. Seating approximately 1,650, (Note: 1,650 as of 1843; 1,661 as of 1880.) it was altered and added to in 1853 by Alexander and William Reid and repainted in 1874, with further alterations by James Matthews of Aberdeen in 1875. Gas was added in 1880. Repairs and alterations were made to the east gable by Francis Davidson Robertson (or Francis Duff Robertson) in 1884–1885. The organ was built by Nicholson & Co Ltd in 1890. Alexander Marshall Mackenzie likely refurbished the church in 1892–1902.

St Rufus was listed on 22 February 1972, and upgraded from Category B to Category A on 24 March 1988.

== Description ==
St Rufus is a large, tall, rectangular building, built in a style described by Charles McKean as "flamboyantly perpendicular", which he contends is typical of Gillespie Graham's work. The church's most notable feature is the square, four-stage bell tower, with clocks on three of its faces, attached to the church's western gable. It sits on a low hill near to the River Isla, on the eastern outskirts of the village that surrounded the Old Keith church. New Keith, which began construction around 1750, lies to the south and east of the site.

=== Interior ===
St Rufus has been described as "a fine example of a more or less complete and original early 19th century church interior, on a grand scale". The main internal doorway into the nave from the entrance lobby at the east end incorporates an unusual war memorial. The outer sides of the recessed double doors bear polished panels, listing men from the parish who died in the First World War; the inner side of the same doors bear similar, albeit smaller and less elaborate, panels recording those who died in the Second World War. The doors are surrounded by a wooded frame with recessed, traceried panels; above, there is a frieze in the form of a crenellated parapet with quatrefoil tracery.

At the west end of the nave is the sanctuary, behind which a "very tall and grand" but "simply decorated" pipe organ, with wood panelling and painted pipes, is installed against the west wall. A staircase on the south side of the sanctuary leads to a raised pulpit mounted against the bottom of the organ.

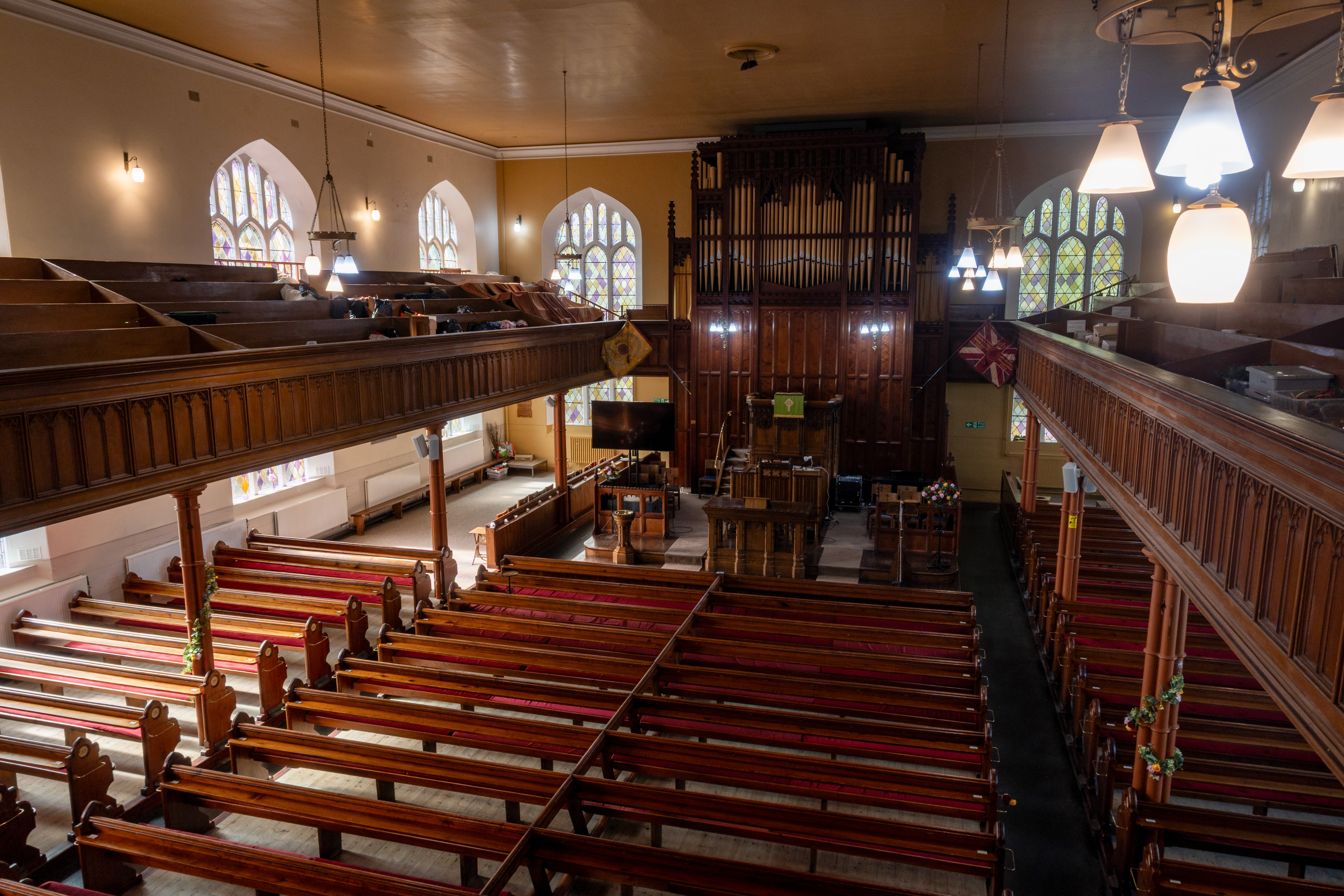
The interior of the church

Near the pulpit is a small enclosure with wooden railings, possibly for the church elders or a choir. In front of this, mounted at the top of the steps leading up to the sanctuary, is the communion table, which is skirted with alternating open and closed panels with detailed carved tracery. The table is flanked with a wooden lectern and a font; behind the table are "large but fairly simple" chairs for the minister and church elders.

"Fairly plain" wooden pews, bearing numbers at their ends, fill the nave. A large gallery with tiered pews runs along the north and south sides, with a bow-shaped curve at the east end of the church, terminating on either side of the sanctuary on the west wall. The gallery is supported by clustered iron columns and two spiral stone staircases at the east end provide access. The front of the gallery is covered by wood panelling and the coat of arms of the Seafields hangs, centred, on the front of the eastern gallery.

The tall nave walls have high-up cornicing and other plasterwork details. The church has retained its original wooden floor, though it is covered in the passages with linoleum for protection from foot traffic. A carved stone sacrament house, removed from the original mediaeval church prior to its demolition, was later installed within one of the walls of St Rufus Church, and now serves as a memorial to James Duncan, a church elder who died in 1970. It bears the initials IO in its upper corners, a reference to James or John Ogilvy who lived at the nearby Milton Tower.

=== Exterior ===
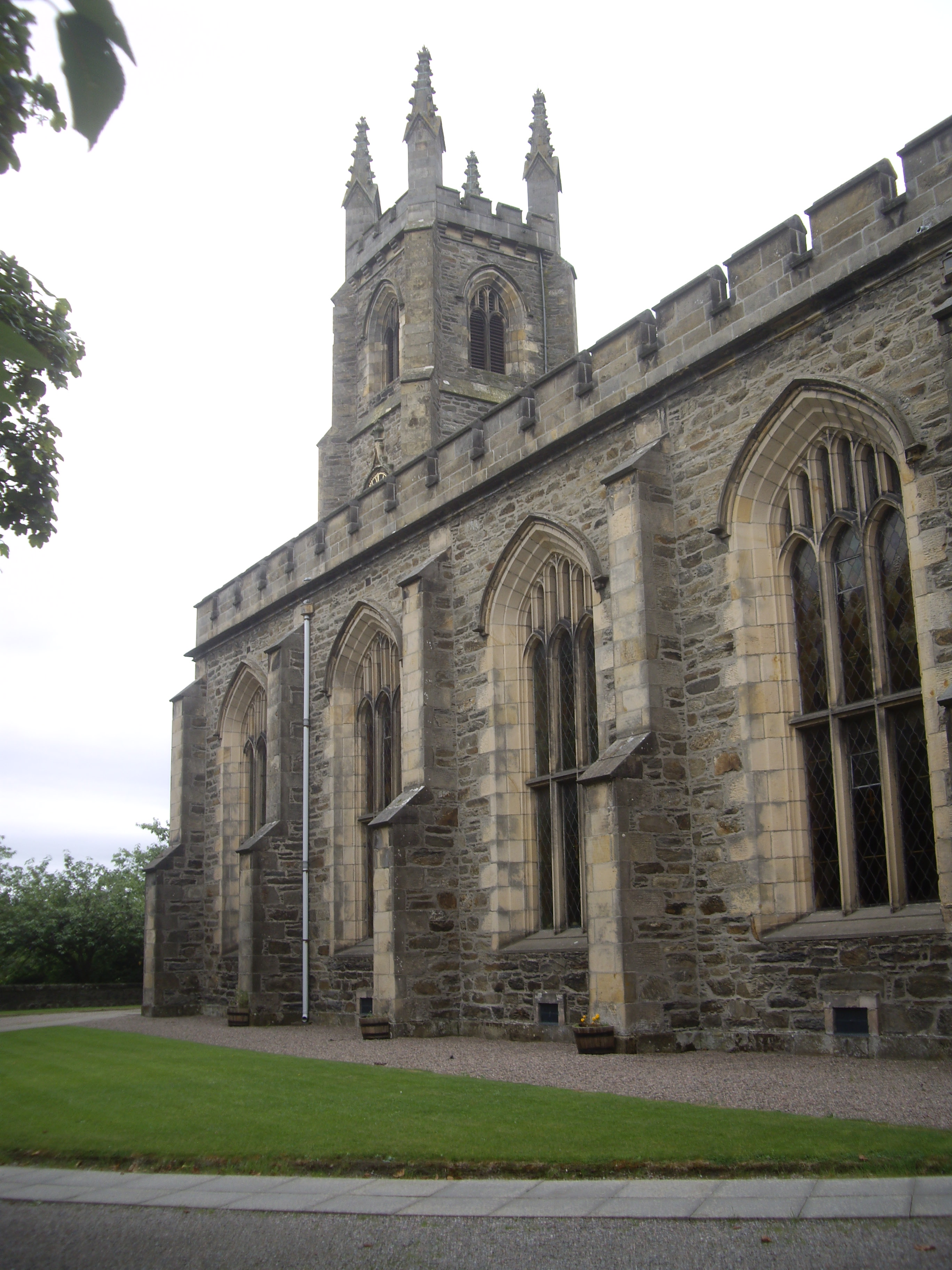
The south side of St Rufus Church, showing four of its five arch-pointed windows, with the tower rising in the background

St Rufus Church is mainly rubble-built, with sandstone ashlar detailing, and a slate roof. Its five-bay north and south sides are buttressed, with crenellated walls and hoodmoulded pointed-arch windows with transoms and tracery and coloured glass, and with wide crowstepped gables at either end.

Attached to the middle of the west gable is a square tower, which rises to a height of 36.6 metres (100 ft) in four stages, each stage narrower than the one beneath it. In the southern face of the bottom stage is a large, pointed-arch hoodmoulded entrance, with chamfered edges and a fanlight above the doors. Carved into the apex of the arch is the date 1816 and a mason's mark possibly that of Jamie "Kirkie" Stuart, a master mason. The northern and western faces of this stage have small windows, also with pointed arches, and simple tracery. The faces of the second stage have narrow lancet windows, and on the north, south and west faces of the third stage there are large decorated clock faces set in carved stone panels. The final stage has recessed pointed-arch louvred openings, and contains a bell made by T. Mears of London in 1818. The top of the tower has a crenellated parapet, with crocketed pinnacles at each corner.

In the middle of the east gable is a shallow porch, flanked by angled buttresses and surmounted by a crenellated corbelled parapet. This houses a pointed-arch hoodmoulded doorway into the church. There are tall lancet windows to either side of the doorway, and a large traceried window above it; most of these were blocked to allow for the installation of the galleries within the church, with only the top sections of the central traceried window retaining its glass panes. There is another small round window near the apex of the gable, and a cross finial at its peak.

The church yard is enclosed by rubble walls, and accessed via a pair of wide cast iron gates.

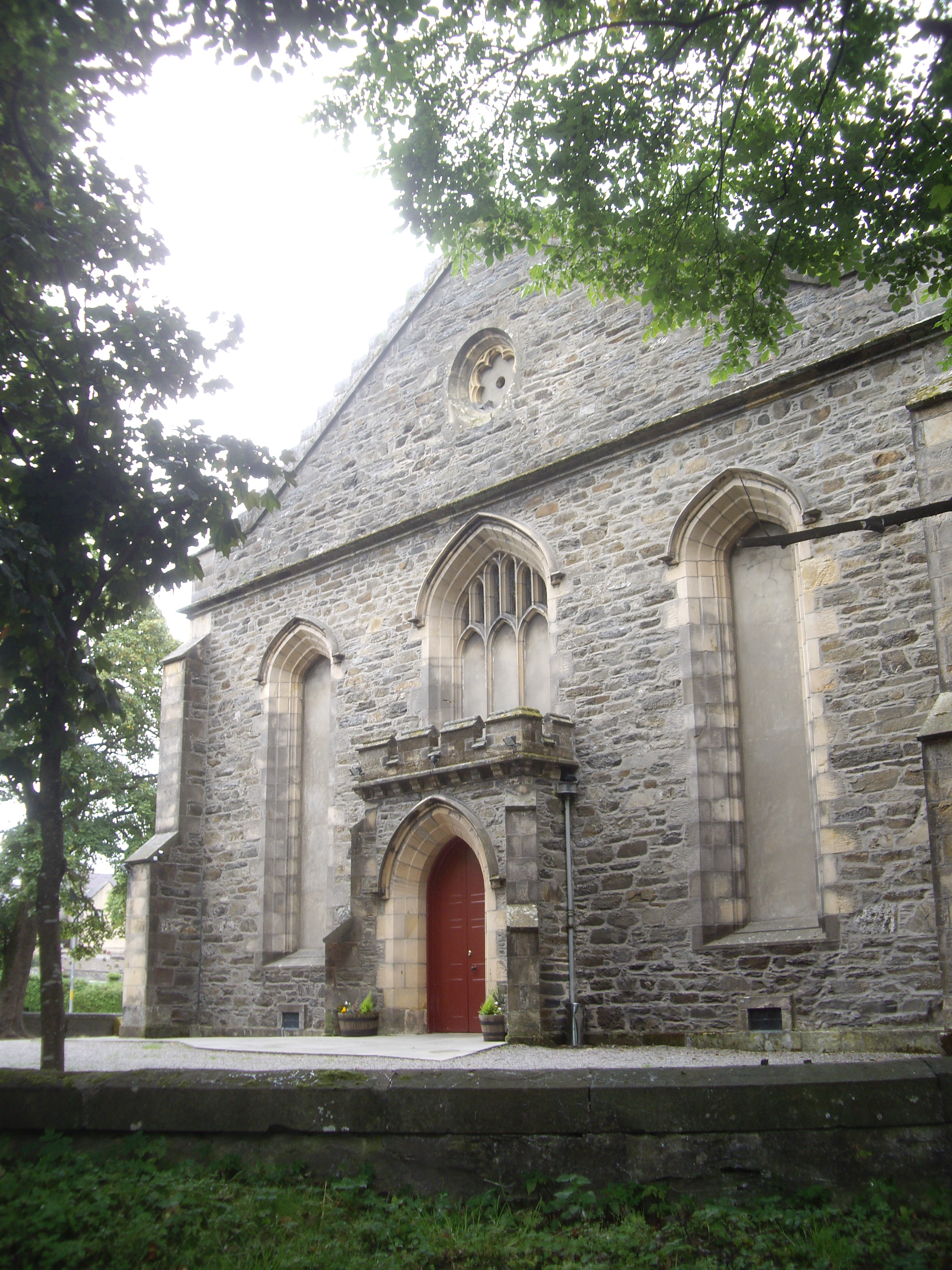
The eastern gable of St Rufus Church

== Current usage ==
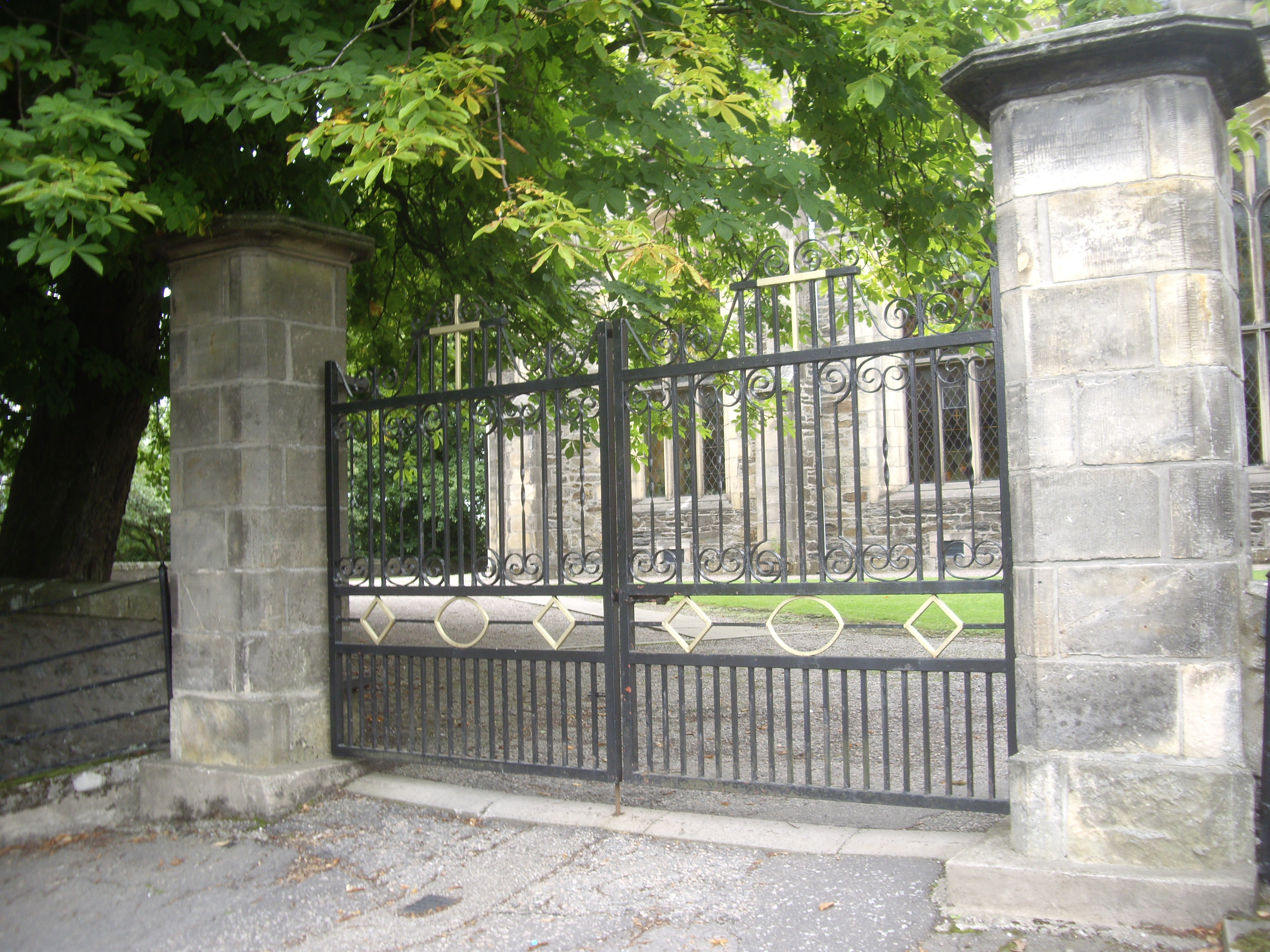
Ashlar gate piers support the cast iron entrance gate

The building continues to be used as a church, with services held on Sunday mornings, led by Interim Moderator Rev Sonia Palmer. Local schools also use the church for end-of-term services. As of 2019, the church had approximately 850 members.
