= Talladale =

Coordinates: 57.67148°N 5.49137°W

- Location within the Highland council area
- OS grid reference: NG918699
- Council area: Highland
- Country: Scotland
- Sovereign state: United Kingdom
- Post town: Achnasheen
- Postcode district: IV22 2
- Police: Scotland
- Fire: Scottish
- Ambulance: Scottish

Talladale is a village on the southwestern shore of Loch Maree in Ross-shire, Scottish Highlands and is in the Scottish council area of Highland.

Talladale lies eight miles (thirteen kilometres) southwest of Gairloch. From 1883 until 1911 there was a coach service from Gairloch connecting with a ferry service operated by passenger vessel Mabel, calling at Talladale on its way to Kinlochewe.
