= River Isla =

The River Isla may refer to:

- River Isla, Moray, a tributary of the River Deveron in Scotland
- River Isla, Perthshire, a tributary of the River Tay in Scotland
