= Keith Old Bridge =

Bridge in Moray, Scotland

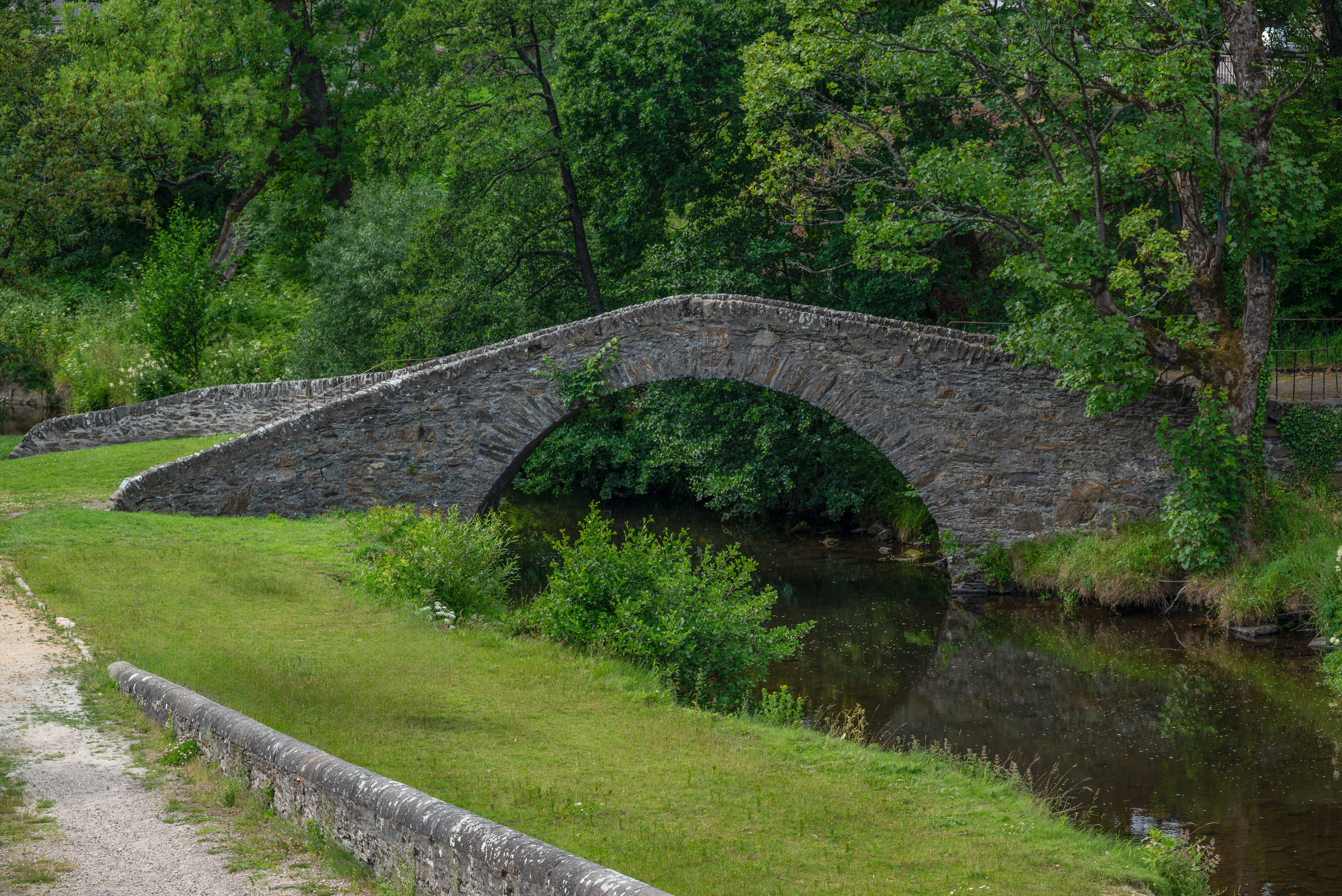
- The east side of Keith Old Bridge
- Coordinates: 57.54365°N 2.95786°W
- OS grid reference: NJ 42762 50796
- Carries: Pedestrians (formerly road traffic)
- Crosses: River Isla

Characteristics
- Material: Granite rubble

History
- Opened: 1609

Listed Building – Category A
- Official name: Old Keith, Bridge Over River Isla
- Designated: 22 February 1972
- Reference no.: LB35661

Location
- Interactive map of Keith Old Bridge

Keith Old Bridge, also known as Keith Auld Brig, is a bridge over the River Isla in Keith in Moray, Scotland. Built in 1609, it is the oldest surviving dated bridge in Moray and is a Category A listed building.

== Description ==
Keith Old Bridge is built of granite rubble, and spans the River Isla in a single segmental arch, linking the higher northern bank to the lower southern one, where it is widely splayed. On its eastern flank it bears a worn carving of the coats of arms of Thomas Moray and Janet Lindsay, and on the west there are date stones showing 1609, the year the bridge was built, and 1822, when repair work was carried out on it. Currently used only by pedestrian traffic, it is approximately 2.8 metres wide, with a span of 8.2 metres.

== History ==
Keith Old Bridge, sometimes known as Keith Auld Brig, was built for the use of packhorses by Thomas Moray and Janet Lindsay, his wife. The couple lived close to the ford that had been in use prior to the bridge's construction, and they were distressed by the dangers involved in crossing it, so paid for a bridge to be built with their own savings. It was built in 1609, making it the oldest surviving dated bridge in Moray. It has been in constant use since that date, and underwent repairs in 1724, and again in 1822. Its role in carrying the main road across the River Isla ended in 1770 when the nearby Union Bridge was built, but it remained open for pedestrians, and stone steps were added at the southern end, probably in the twentieth century.

The bridge was designated a Category B listed building in 1972, and upgraded to Category A in 1988.

== See also ==
- List of bridges in Scotland
