= John Ripley =

Recipient of the Victoria Cross

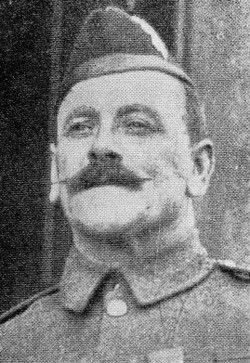
- Born: 20 August 1867; Keith, Banffshire, Scotland
- Died: 14 August 1933 (aged 65); St Andrews, Fife, Scotland
- Burial place: Upper Largo Cemetery, Fife
- Military career
- Allegiance: United Kingdom
- Branch: British Army
- Rank: Sergeant
- Units: Black Watch
- Conflicts: World War I
- Awards: Victoria Cross

John Ripley VC (20 August 1867 – 14 August 1933) was a Scottish recipient of the Victoria Cross (VC), the highest and most prestigious award for gallantry in the face of the enemy that can be awarded to members of British and Commonwealth forces.

== Early life ==
Ripley was born in Keith, Banffshire, Scotland on 20 August 1867. On leaving school he had a number of jobs, finally becoming a slater, settling in St Andrews, Fife. In June 1895, he married Jane Laing, a domestic servant. They had a son, Alexander, who served in the 7th Battalion, Black Watch during the First World War.

In 1884, Ripley joined the part-time Volunteer Force. He served for many years in the 6th Volunteer Battalion, Black Watch, becoming a sergeant and one of his company's best shots. He received the Volunteer Long Service Medal in January 1909, and retired in 1912.

On the outbreak of the First World War in the summer of 1914, he volunteered as a recruiting sergeant, before enlisting for active service on 25 September 1914. He went to France with the 1st Battalion, Black Watch in mid-February 1915, with the rank of corporal.

== VC action ==
He was 47 years old, and a corporal in the 1st Battalion, The Black Watch (Royal Highland Regiment), British Army at the battle of Aubers Ridge when the following deed took place for which he was awarded the VC:

On 9 May 1915 at Rue du Bois, France, Corporal Ripley led his section on the right of the platoon in the assault and was the first man of the battalion to climb the enemy's parapet. From there he directed those following him to the gaps in the German wire entanglements. He then led his section through a breach in the parapet to a second line of trench. With seven or eight men he established himself, blocking other flanks, and continued to hold the position until all his men had fallen and he himself was badly wounded in the head.

The VC was presented to him by King George V at Buckingham Palace on 12 July 1915.

At 47, Ripley was the oldest recipient to win the VC during the First World War.

== Later life ==
Recovering from his wounds, Ripley was appointed acting sergeant in July 1915 and undertook recruiting duties in Edinburgh. Discharged from the army in March 1919, he returned to work as a slater, also sweeping chimneys and serving in the town's fire brigade. He was later given the Freedom of St Andrews.

While working as a slater in August 1933, Ripley fell from a ladder and seriously injured his spine. He died shortly after admission to hospital, aged 65. He was buried in Upper Largo Cemetery, Fife.

His medals are currently held privately.

== Bibliography ==
- Monuments to Courage (David Harvey, 1999)
- Scotland's Forgotten Valour (Graham Ross, 1995)
- Batchelor, Peter; Matson, Christopher (2011). The Western Front 1915. VCs of the First World War. Stroud, Gloucestershire: The History Press. ISBN 978-0-7524-6057-4.
- Buzzell, Nora, ed. (1997). The Register of the Victoria Cross. Cheltenham, Gloucestershire: This England Alma House. ISBN 0-906324-27-0.
