= Isle Maree =

Island in Loch Maree, Scotland

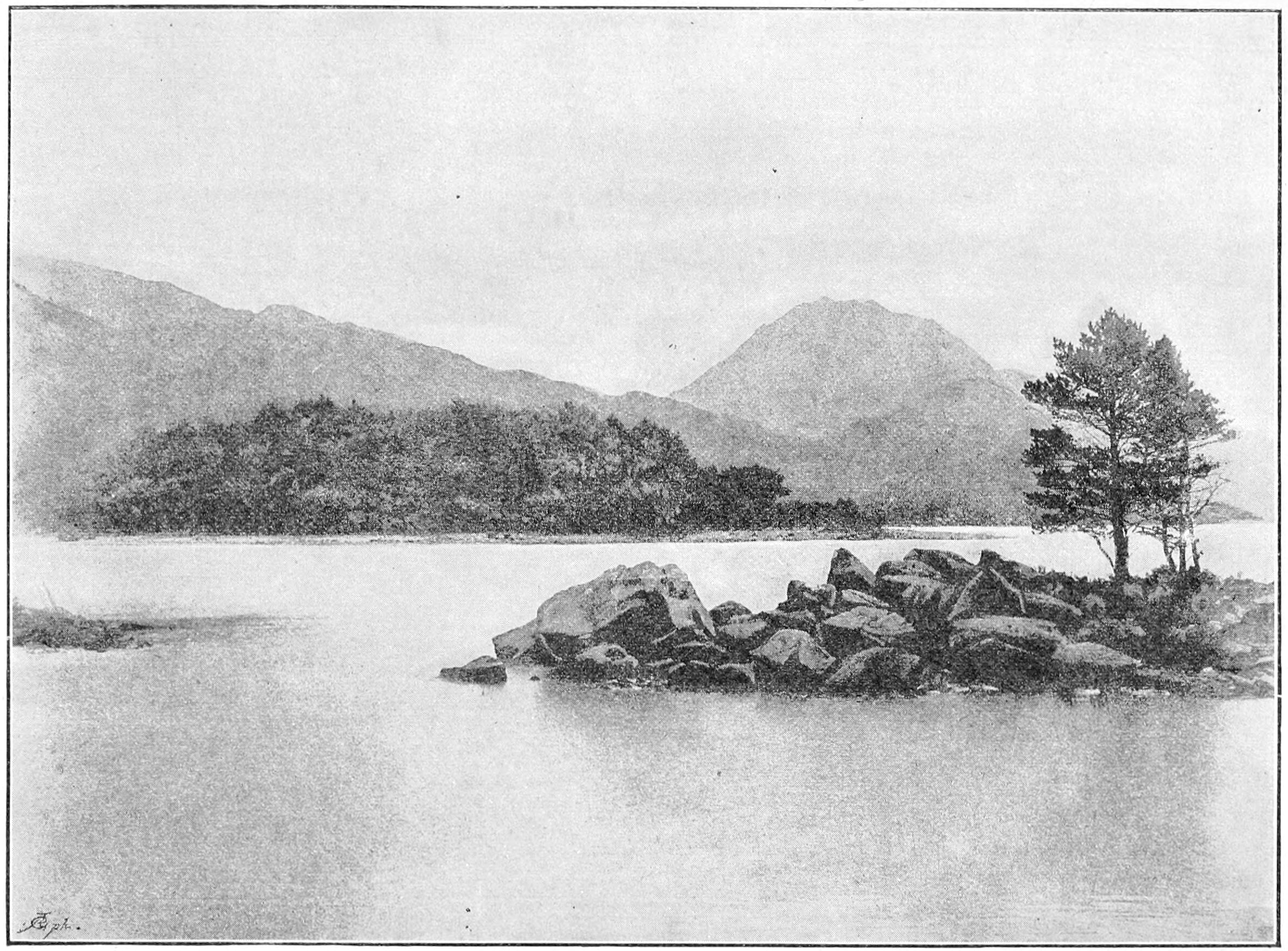
Distant view, published 1891

Isle Maree (Scottish Gaelic: Eilean Maolruibhe) is an island and traditional site of Christian pilgrimage and pattern day festivals in Loch Maree, Scotland.

== History ==
It has the ruins of a chapel, graveyard, holy well, and holy tree on it, believed to be the 8th-century hermitage of Saint Maol Rubha (d. 722), a missionary from Bangor Abbey in Gaelic Ireland who founded the Celtic Church monastery of Applecross (Scottish Gaelic: Obar Crosain) in 672. The island contains ancient stands of oak, holly and other trees not found on the other islands in the loch. The waters of the loch were thought to be a holy well with curative effects. For example, as recently as the 18th century, being towed sunwise three times around the island behind a boat followed each time by a dip in the loch waters was believed to impart a cure for mental illness through St. Mael Ruba's intercession. It is also traditionally said in Highland Scottish culture that anyone acting irrationally, "must be wanting a dip in Loch Maree."

Two incised cross-slabs of probably 8th-century date are to be seen in the ancient graveyard. The local oral tradition (still observed) commands that nothing must ever be taken from the island, be it even a pebble from the shore, lest the insanity formerly cured in past pilgrims follow the item back into the outside world.

In the 17th-century, the Church of Scotland Presbytery of Dingwall was disturbed by reports of several rituals, thought to be of pagan origin, such as the slaughter and roasting of bulls, on an island in Loch Maree, as part of the celebration of the saint's feast day. These revolved around, some believe, an allegedly debased memory of St Máel Ruba, who is thought to have become mixed with an ancient pre-Christian cult of 'God Mourie'. The island is near the north shore of the loch, and the adjacent shore is called in Gaelic Creag nan Tarbh, 'Cliff of the Bull', recalling these pattern day festivals.

== Wish tree ==
On the island of St Maol Rubha or St Maree, in Loch Maree, Gairloch in the Highlands is an oak wish tree made famous by a visit in 1877 by Queen Victoria and its inclusion in her published diaries. The tree, and others surrounding it, are festooned with hammered-in coins. The original tree, now much decayed, died many years ago because of copper poisoning. It is near the healing well of St Maree, to which votive offerings were made. Records show that bulls were sacrificed openly up until the 18th century

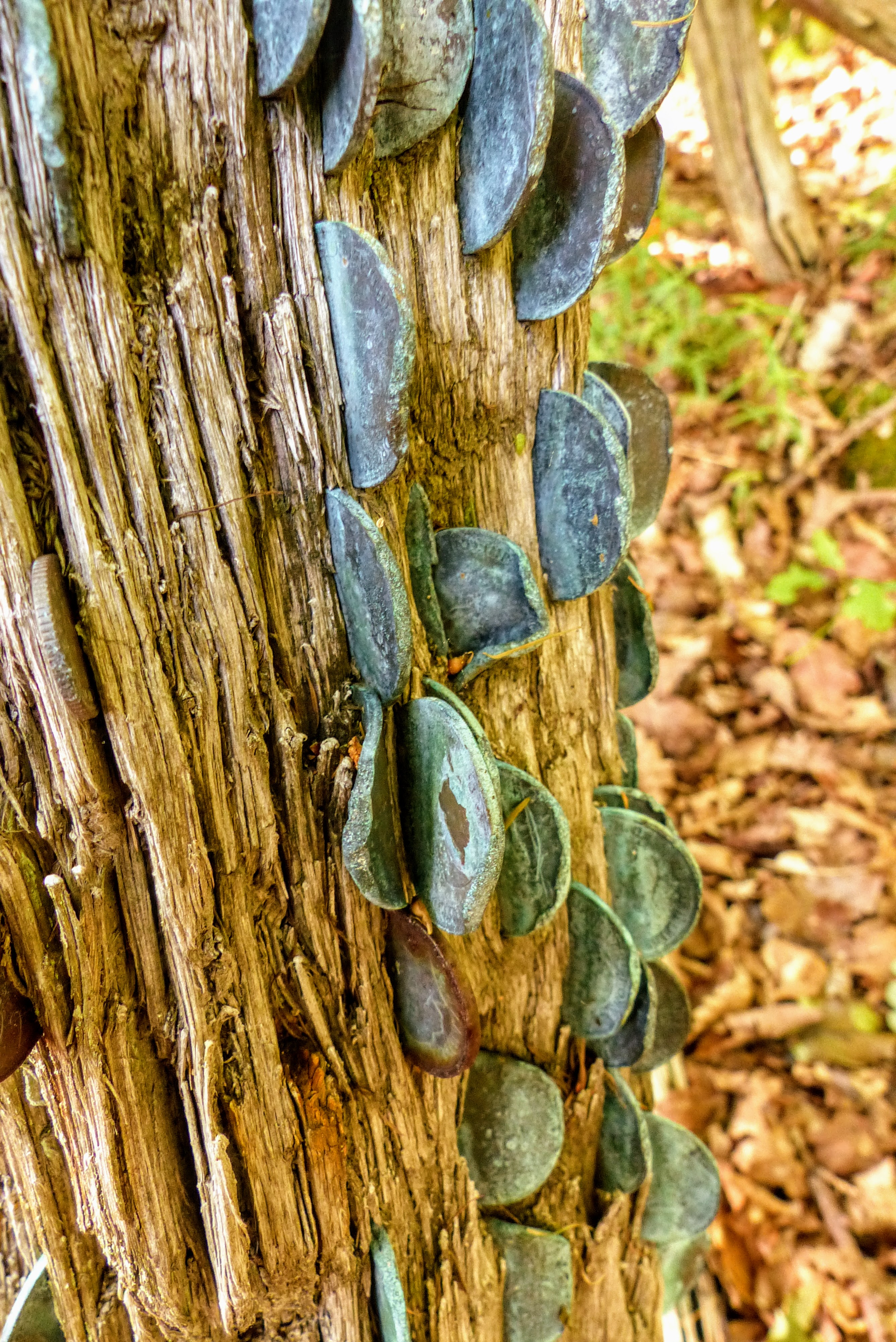
Old coins placed in the Wish Tree on Isle Maree.

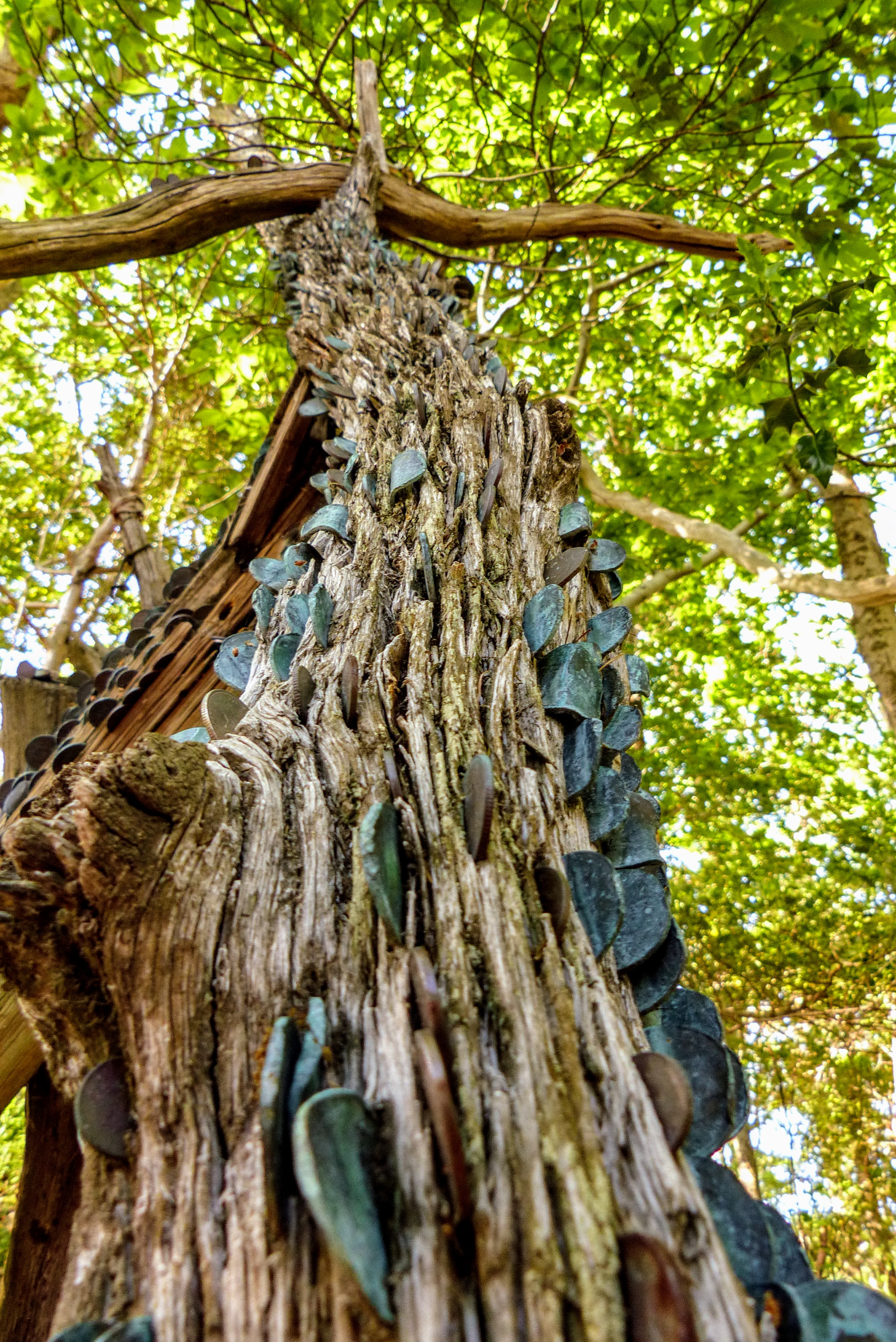
Old coins placed in the Wish Tree on Isle Maree.

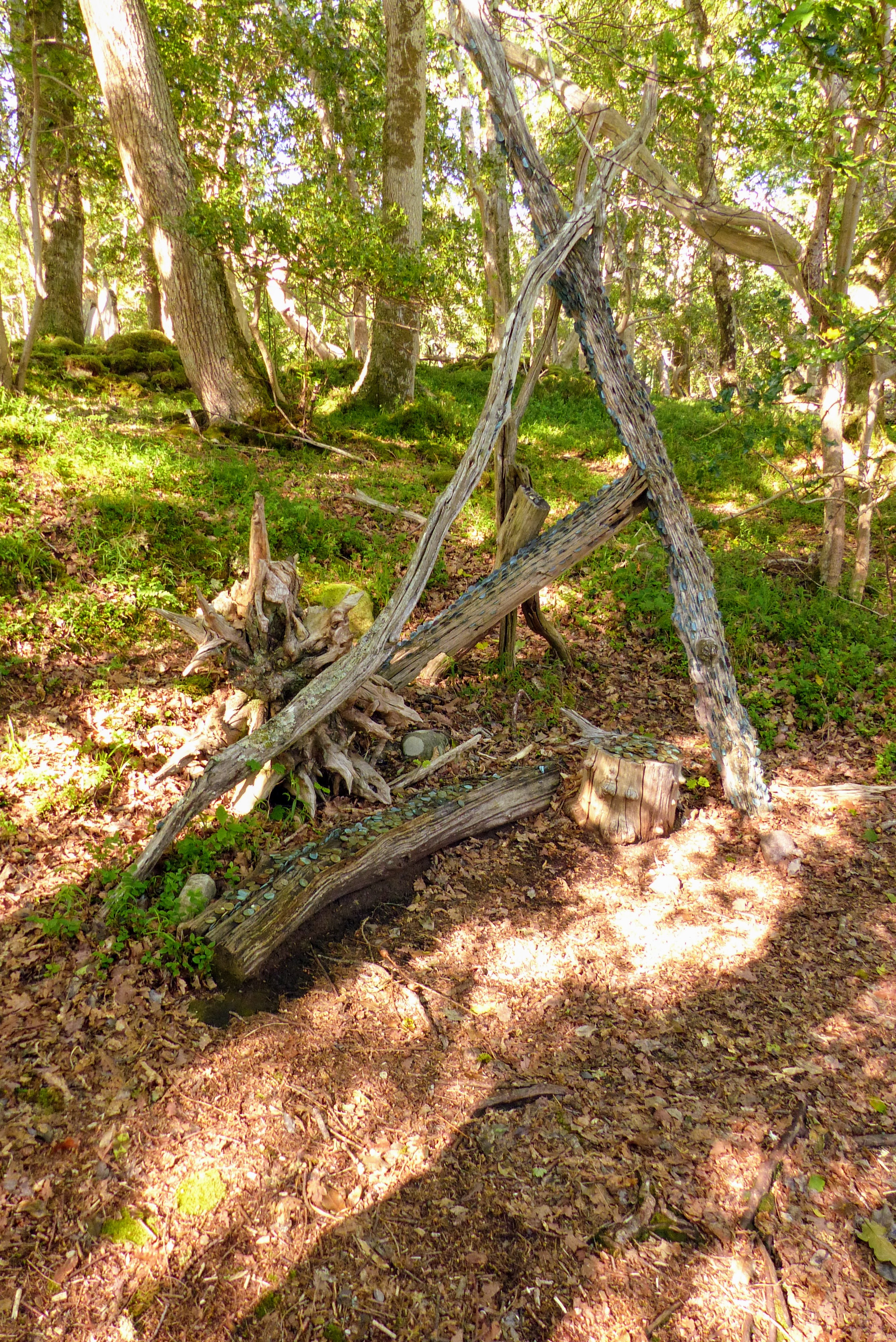
Old coins placed in the Wish Tree on Isle Maree.

== See also ==
- List of islands of Scotland

== Footnotes ==
- "Chapel & Graveyard, Isle Maree". Highland Council HER.
- "Loch Maree Islands". Scottish Natural Heritage. Archived from the original on 16 July 2011.
