= Loch Maree =

Loch in Wester Ross, in the Northwest Highlands of Scotland

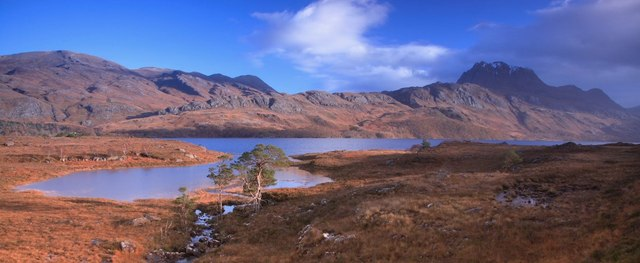
- Panorama of Loch Maree, with Slioch in the background.

- Location within Highland
- Location: Northwest Highlands, Scotland
- Coordinates: 57°41′23″N 5°27′27″W
- Catchment area: Beinn Eighe, Slioch, Fisherfield, Glen Docherty, Coulin, Slattadale, Talladale
- Basin countries: Scotland
- Max. length: 21.66 km (13.46 mi)
- Max. width: 4 km (2.5 mi)
- Surface area: 28.7 km^{2} (11.08 mi^{2})
- Average depth: 38 m (125 ft)
- Max. depth: 112 m (367 ft)
- Water volume: 1.09 km^{3} (38.5×10^{9} cu ft)
- Islands: 60

Ramsar Wetland
- Designated: 19 September 1994
- Reference no.: 700

Loch Maree (Scottish Gaelic: Loch Ma-ruibhe) is a loch in Wester Ross in the Northwest Highlands of Scotland. At 21.7 km (13.46 mi) long and with a maximum width of four kilometres (2 1/2 mi), it is the fourth-largest freshwater loch in Scotland; it is the largest north of Loch Ness. Its surface area is 28.7 km^{2} (11.08 mi^{2}).

Loch Maree contains five large wooded islands and over 60 smaller ones, many of which have their own lochans. The largest island, Eilean Sùbhainn, contains a loch that itself contains an island, a situation that occurs nowhere else in Great Britain. Isle Maree holds the remains of a Pre-Reformation chapel and Christian pilgrimage shrine believed to be the 8th century hermitage of Saint Máel Ruba (d. 722), a Celtic Church missionary from Bangor Abbey in Gaelic Ireland who also founded the monastery of Applecross in 672. It is after him that Loch Maree is named; prior to the saint's arrival in the area the loch is believed to have been named Loch Ewe, as evidenced by the name of the village of Kinlochewe (Scottish Gaelic: Ceann Loch Iù, meaning "Head of Loch Ewe") which is located at the eastern end of Loch Maree.

The loch is important for wildlife. It is the site of one of the largest breeding concentrations of black-throated diver in Great Britain, and also holds an important population of Eurasian otter. The islands of Loch Maree are the location of some of the best native Caledonian pinewood in Scotland, and are particularly noted for their dragonflies, with 12 species having been recorded. The waters, islands and shoreline of Loch Maree are protected by several overlapping conservation designations.

== Geography ==
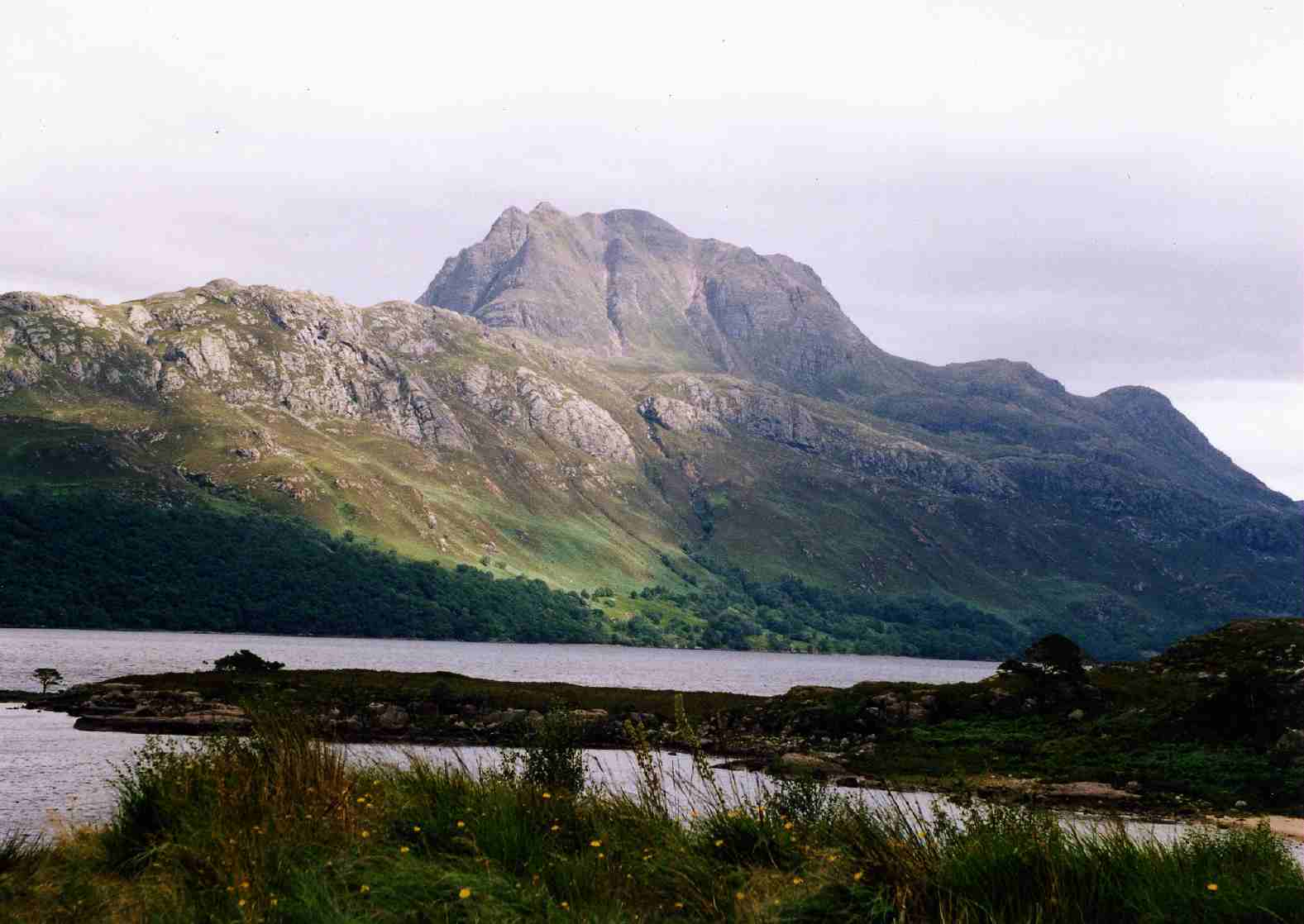
Slioch seen from the shores of Loch Maree.

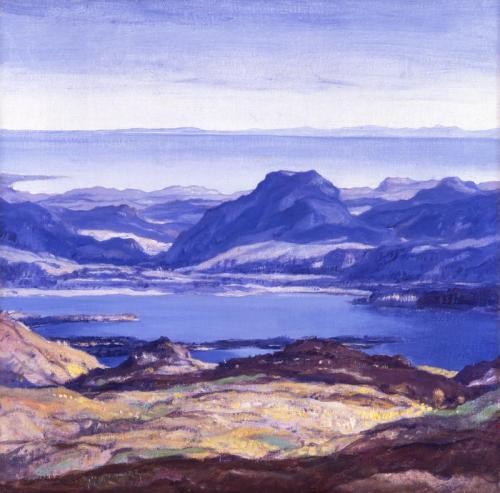
Loch Maree by Sir David Young Cameron, c. 1900–1924

Loch Maree is much longer than it is wide, stretching along a northwest-southeast axis. The outflow is via the short River Ewe, through which water enters the sea loch of Loch Ewe, close to the village of Poolewe; the village of Kinlochewe lies at the head of the loch at the southeastern end. The A832 road between the two runs along much of the southwestern shore of the loch, but diverges from it in the north to run via Gairloch, along the coast from Poolewe. It is 10 metres (33 ft) above mean sea level (winter water level).

Loch Maree It is divided into three main basins, and has many islands: the ratio of the area of the islands to the area of the surface water is greater than any other large loch in Scotland. The deepest of the basins, at 112 m (367 ft), is known as the Grudie Basin, and lies between Isle Maree and the head of the loch. To the northwest of this basin lies the Slattadale Basin, which contains the majority of the islands. North of the islands lies a shallower area, separating the Slattadale Basin from the Ardlair Basin, the most irregularly shaped of the three.

The most prominent mountain on the northern side of Loch Maree is Slioch, one of Scotland's Munros (a mountain over 3,000 ft (910 m) high), which dominates the eastern end of the loch above Kinlochewe. It is composed mainly of Torridonian sandstone of Precambrian age, lying on a bedrock of Lewisian gneiss. It is popular for hill walking, scrambling and climbing. Other peaks on the northern side include Beinn Àirigh Charr and Beinn Làir, both of which are classified as Corbetts. The entire length of the northeastern shore of Loch Maree forms part of the 35,072 ha (86,664 acres) Letterewe, Heights of Kinlochewe & Tournaig Estate, which extends north over an area known as the Fisherfield Forest. The southwestern side of Loch Maree is also very mountainous, comprising the Torridon Forest. The most prominent peak is Beinn Eighe, which is capped with white quartzite. Three main landowners occupy the southwestern shore: from south to north these are NatureScot (the Beinn Eighe National Nature Reserve), the 5,154 ha (12,737 acres) Grudie & Talladale Estate, and the 21,701 ha (53,625 acres) Gairloch (Flowerdale & Shieldaig) & Conon Estate.

== History ==
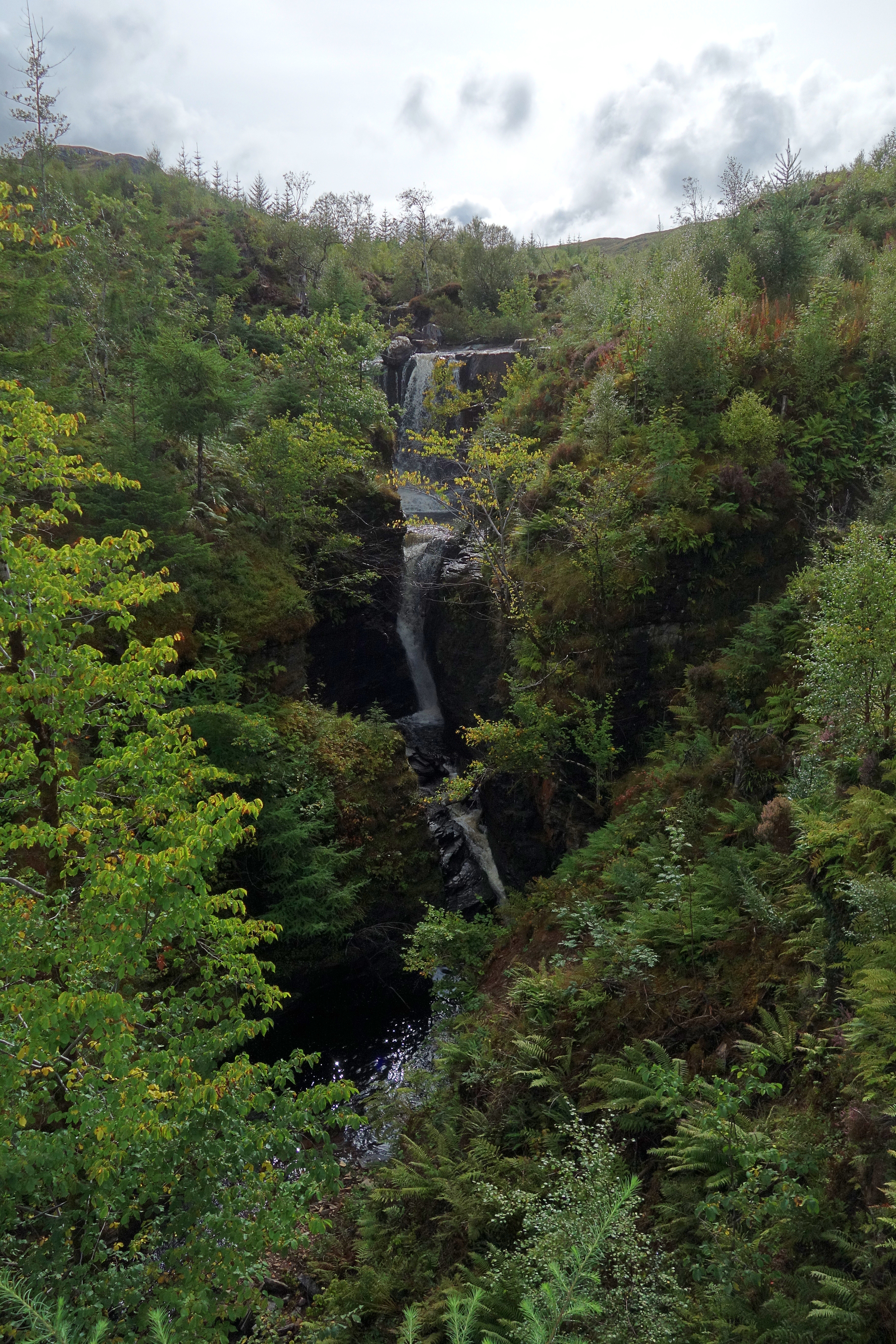
Victoria Falls, named following a visit by Queen Victoria.

Between 671 and 722, Celtic Church missionary St Máel Ruba arrived at Loch Maree, and founded a chapel and Christian pilgrimage shrine on Eilean Maolruibhe. Remains of this chapel were reportedly still visible in 1861 but no traces now remain, although the burial ground associated with the chapel is still extant. A small covered holy well on the island is said to have been consecrated by the saint.

During the middle ages the island of Eilean Ghrùididh on Loch Maree was a centre for the MacBeaths; in or shortly after 1430 the MacBeaths were displaced by Clan MacLeod. Investigation of the island in 1965 found a fortified area measuring 44 by 36 metres with walls 1 m thick and 2 m high, with a 1.8 m deep dungeon in the southeast corner. No buildings were found within the fortifications.

Due to its remote location there is now little industry surrounding Loch Maree, however the area was formerly a centre for ironworking. During the seventeenth century up to 8 hectares of oak woodlands a day were turned into charcoal to fuel the smelting of bog iron at Letterewe on the northeast shore. Workmen from these iron furnaces are said to have been buried on Isle Maree. Remains of one iron furnace can be seen at a site known as the Red Smiddy on the northeast bank of the River Ewe between the outflow from the loch and Poolewe. Pieces of ore, slag and iron have been found at this site.

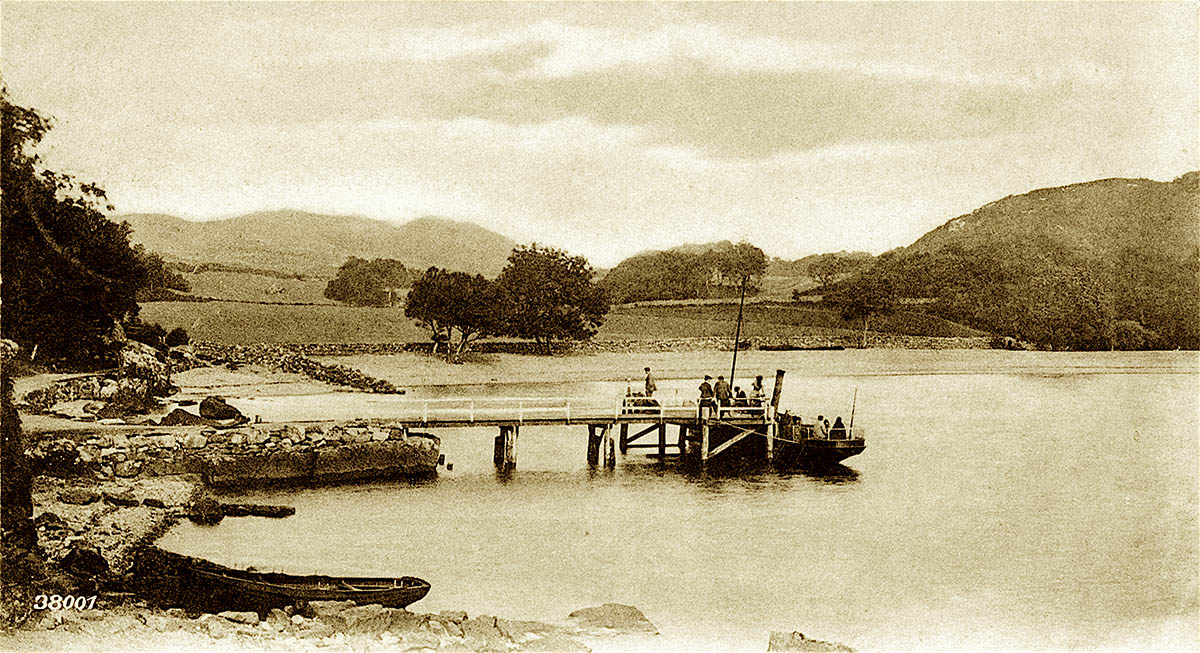
SS Mabel, the Loch Marie steamboat, at Tollie Bay, north-west end of the loch, 1905

The loch became a popular spot for trout fishing after Queen Victoria visited the Loch Maree Hotel at Talladale in 1877, a visit which led to the naming of Victoria Falls, an attractive waterfall in the vicinity of the hotel. In 1883 the proprietor of the Loch Maree Hotel inaugurated a steamboat service on the loch, with a connecting carriage service to Achnasheen railway station, linking Poolewe with Kinlochewe. The service was withdrawn in about 1911. In 1893, there was a proposal to build a branch railway from Achnasheen to Aultbea along the south shore of Loch Maree. The railway would have increased Victorian tourist traffic, as well as providing a service for fisheries and the mail and a connection to Stornoway, however the plan was later abandoned.

== Ecology ==
Loch Maree is of international importance for its special wildlife and biodiversity, and is the site of one of the largest breeding concentrations of black-throated diver in Great Britain.

Sea trout and salmon are an important part of the loch's ecosystem, providing food for black-throated diver and Eurasian otter (Lutra lutra): juvenile trout can be an important part of the diet of black-throated diver. Until recently, thousands of adult sea trout (seagoing brown trout Salmo trutta) and salmon (Salmo salar) returned to the loch from the sea every summer. Sea trout gathered in huge numbers in certain bays, providing some of the most exciting angling in Scotland for which the loch had an international reputation. A British record sea trout of 19.5 lb (8.8 kg) was caught on a "dapping fly" in the loch in 1952. The sea trout fishery collapsed in the 1980s and 1990s. The loch also has two separate populations of Arctic char (Salvelinus alpinus) about which little is known. One form of charr, with a big eye which feeds on the bottom in deep water matures at less than 15 cm. The other form grows to over 32 cm and can sometimes be seen in shoals ruffling the surface when the loch is calm.

The islands of Loch Maree are wooded, being the location of some of the best native Caledonian pinewood in Scotland. These woodlands, along with others in Wester Ross, are genetically distinct from other pinewoods in Scotland, showing more similarity to those in southern Europe. It is thought that this results from the fact that western Scotland became ice-free first at the end of the last ice-age, allowing pine to move north along the western fringe of Europe. Pines reached Eastern Scotland from more northerly areas during a later period, as the ice sheets retreated further. Scots pine are the dominant species in these woodlands, however other tree species such as rock whitebeam and juniper are also present. The islands of Loch Maree are particularly noted for their dragonflies, with 12 species having been recorded, including the northern emerald, azure hawker and white-faced darter. Pine martens and white-tailed eagles can be found on the islands, which are also a breeding site for redwings; greylag geese were known to breed here in the past, but have not done so since the 1970s.

== Conservation designations ==
Loch Maree Islands National Nature Reserve
- IUCN category IV (habitat/species management area)
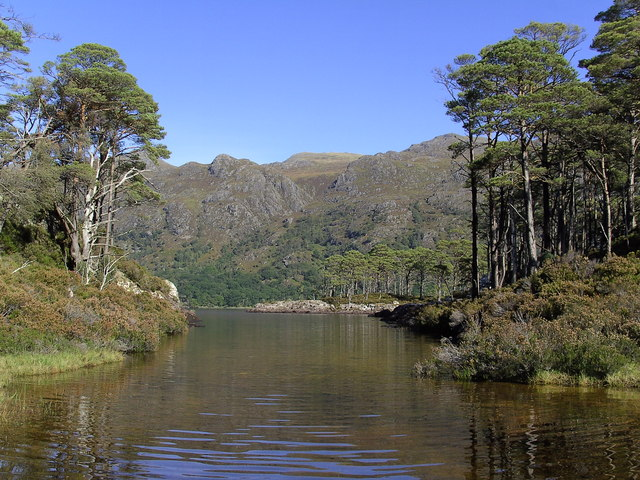
- Amongst the islands of Loch Maree.

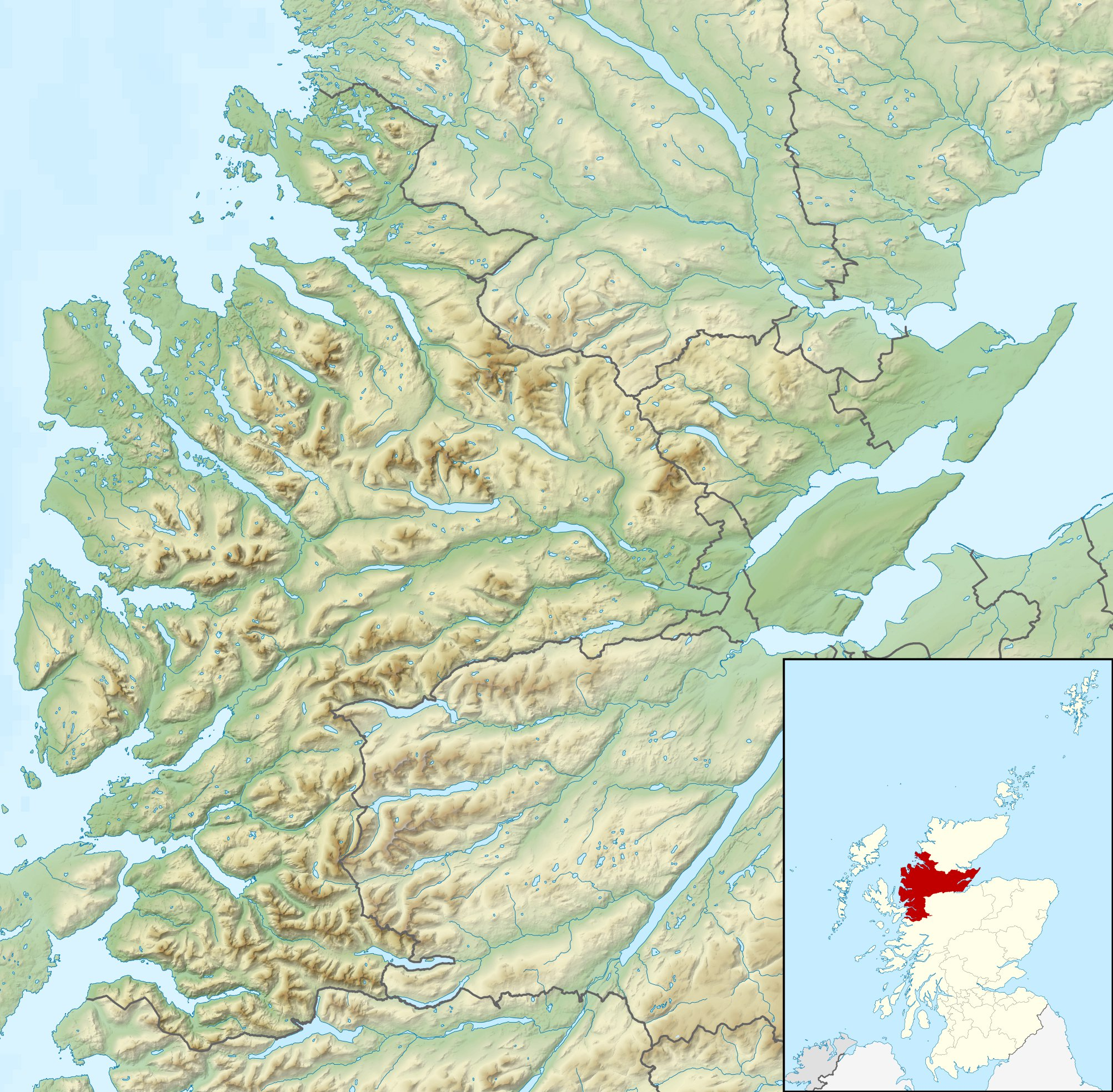
- Location within Ross and Cromarty
- Location: Wester Ross, Scotland
- Coordinates: 57.694°N 5.509°W
- Area: 200 ha
- Established: 1977
- Governing body: NatureScot
- Website: Beinn Eighe and Loch Maree Islands National Nature Reserve

The presence of black-throated divers on the loch has led to it being designated as Special Protection Area (SPA) under the EU Habitats Directive. The loch is also designated as a Special Area of Conservation (SAC), forming part of the Loch Maree Complex SAC, which extends to cover the surrounding hills including Beinn Eighe.

Over 60 islands within the loch are designated as the Loch Maree Islands National Nature Reserve (NNR), which has since 2014 been jointly managed with the neighbouring Beinn Eighe NNR as a single reserve. The Beinn Eighe and Loch Maree Islands NNR forms part of the designated Core Zone of the Wester Ross UNESCO Biosphere reserve.

Loch Maree is classified as a Category IV protected area by the International Union for Conservation of Nature, and has been designated as a Ramsar site since 19 September 1994. It is also a Site of Special Scientific Interest (SSSI), and lies within the Wester Ross national scenic area.

== In media ==
Button-box accordionist, Fergie MacDonald topped the Scottish pop charts in 1966 with the tune "Loch Maree Islands" which pays tribute to the views of the loch, and vocal versions have been recorded by many artists over the years, notably Calum Kennedy. More recently a version of the song was included on Peat and Diesel's 2019 album Uptown Fank.

In the 2009-10 series of the BBC's Natural World, episode 6, Highland Haven, stayed closer to home than usual, with a year-long look at the environment and wildlife of Loch Maree and its surroundings.

Loch Maree and its islands, including Isle Maree, Juniper and Rough Islands are the setting of Oscar de Muriel's 2018 historical-crime novel Loch of the Dead, the fourth book in his Frey & McGray series.

Loch Maree is mentioned in the Runrig song "The Summer Walkers" from the album The Stamping Ground.

And it's up by the Shin
And up by the 'Naver
And the long winding shores Of Loch Maree
By Ben Hope and Ben Loyal
Stack and by Arkle
The road reaches far
Now the summer is here

== Folklore ==
Thomas Pennant, writing in 1772, recorded that the loch was considered a holy well whose waters were thought to have curative effects, with being submerged in the water thought to be a cure for lunacy.

Isle Maree holds an oak wish tree made famous by a visit in 1877 by Queen Victoria mentioned in her published diaries. The tree, and others surrounding it, are festooned with hammered-in coins. It is near the traditional Christian pilgrimage shrine and holy well of local Celtic Church missionary St. Máel Rubha, whose intercession was believed to cure mental illnesses. In annual feast day festivals similar to Irish pattern days and Breton Pardons, votive offerings were made, including the slaughter and roasting of bulls, which continued up to the 18th century, according to records. This has led to speculation that the island was a place of pre-Christian pagan worship which was taken over by the saint. The same island contains ancient stands of oak and holly which have been linked with ancient Scottish druids.

Like Loch Ness and Loch Morar, Loch Maree has its own monster in the form of the muc-sheilch.

== See also ==
- SS Mabel, a small passenger steamer operating on the loch between 1883 and 1911.

== Sources ==
- "The Story of Beinn Eighe and Loch Mare Islands National Nature Reserve" (PDF). Scottish Natural Heritage. 2008.
- Chisholm, Hugh, ed. (1911). "Maree, Loch" . Encyclopædia Britannica (11th ed.). Cambridge University Press.
- John Murray; Laurence Pullar (1909). "Bathymetrical Survey of the Fresh-Water Lochs of Scotland, 1897-1909". National Library of Scotland.
