= Milton Tower =

15th-century tower house in Scotland

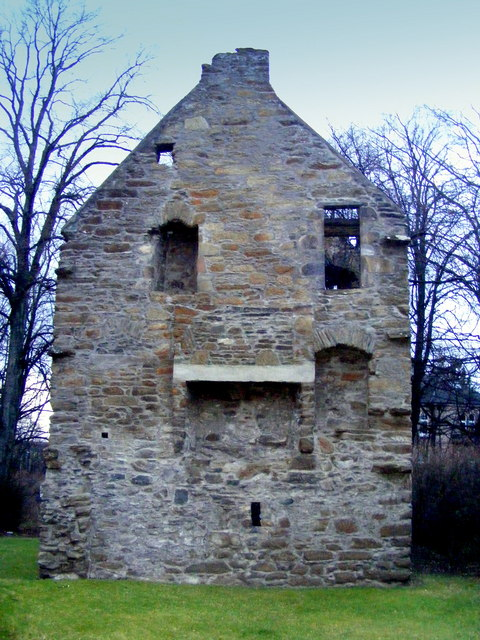
- The tower viewed from the south, 2008

- Location of the tower in Scotland
- 57°32′47″N 2°57′25″W
- Type: Tower house
- Location: Keith, Moray

History
- Built: 1480
- Built for: George Ogilvie

Scheduled monument
- Designated: 1993
- Reference no.: SM5533

Milton Tower is a ruined castle in Keith, Moray in Scotland. Built and remodelled over several centuries, it was started around 1480 for George Ogilvie, and served as a seat of the Ogilvies, who had succeeded the Abbots of Kinloss as the feuars of the district after the Scottish Reformation. Renovated by Margaret Ogilvie in 1601, the tower passed by marriage into the Oliphant family in 1707, but was neglected and gradually fell into disrepair after 1715. It was finally abandoned in 1829, and much of the stone that made up the fabric of the building was removed for use elsewhere.

Only the northern part of the castle now remains, in the form of a two-storied tower with a garret above a vaulted ground floor. The fireplace of what would have been the great hall is exposed on the south face of the surviving structure at the level of the first floor, alongside a substantial aumbry. There is a segmental-arched entrance in the west wall, and a small window to the garret in the south face of the tower. The walls, which are intact to the level of the roof, are made of rubble with ashlar detailing, and up to 0.9 metres (3.0 ft) thick in places. The tower is approximately 7.2 metres (23.6 ft) from east to west, and 6.4 metres (21.0 ft) from north to south. The site it stands on can be accessed from the west side, via an iron gate.

Milton Tower was the birthplace of St John Ogilvie, Scotland's only post-Reformation Catholic saint. It was designated a scheduled monument in 1993, and is recognised as a nationally significant example of a fifteenth-century defensive residence.
