= Máel Ruba =

Irish saint (c. 642–722)

Saint Máel Ruba
- Born: 642; Bangor, County Down, Ireland
- Died: 722; Teampull, Sutherland, Scotland
- Venerated in: Catholic Church, Eastern Orthodox Church, Scottish Episcopal Church
- Canonized: Pre-Congregation
- Feast: 20 April, 21 April, 27 August

Máel Ruba (c. 642–722) is an Irish saint of the Christian Church who was active in Scotland. Originally from Bangor, County Down, Ireland, he was a monk and founded the monastic community of Applecross in Ross, one of the best attested early Christian monasteries in what is now Scotland. Forms of his name include Máelrubai (Old Irish spelling), Maol Rubha (MoRubha/MaRuibhe) (Scottish Gaelic spelling), or Malruibhe, and it is sometimes latinised as Rufus.

== Life ==
Máel Ruba was descended from Niall, King of Ireland, via his father Elganach. His mother, Subtan, was a niece of Saint Comgall (d. 597 or 602) of Bangor. Máel Ruba was born in the area of Derry and was educated at Bangor. In 671, when he was thirty, he sailed from Ireland to Scotland with a group of monks.

For two years he travelled around the area, chiefly in Argyll, perhaps founding some of the many churches still dedicated to him, before settling at Aporcrosan (Applecross) in 673, in Pictish territory in the west of Ross opposite the islands of Skye and Raasay. Thence he set out on missionary journeys: westward to the islands Skye and Lewis, eastward to Forres and Keith, and northward to Loch Shin, Durness, and Farr.

== The monastery at Applecross ==
The Gaelic name of Applecross, "A' Chomraich", 'The Sanctuary', derives from an area of inviolate ground which surrounded the monastery. Its limits were originally marked by crosses. Unfortunately, only a fragment of one of these has survived, within the farmyard at Camusterrach, south of Applecross village.

Both Máel Ruba's voyage to 'Scotland' and his foundation of Applecross are recorded in contemporary Irish annals, implying that they were considered of great significance at the time. Máel Ruba's monastery was a major Christian centre and instrumental in the spread of both Christianity and Gaelic culture amongst the Picts of northern Scotland.

The succession of the abbots ceases to be recorded in the Irish annals during the course of the ninth century. It is likely that this is the result of (unrecorded) raids by Vikings.

A setting of two small stones in the graveyard at Applecross is still pointed out as the (supposed) site of his grave.

== Death ==
According to local tradition, on his last journey he was killed by Danish vikings, probably at Teampull, around nine miles up Strathnaver from Farr, where he had built a monastic cell, and was buried near the River Naver, not far from his cell, where his grave is still marked by "a rough cross-marked stone". However, 722 may be too early for Scandinavian raiders to have been involved, as the first historically recorded Viking attacks on Scotland and Ireland date to the 790s.

Another tradition, found in the Aberdeen Breviary, is that he was killed at Urquhart and buried at Abercrossan. This is probably a mistake arising from a confusion of Gaelic place-names.

The most reliable sources, contemporary Irish annals, record that he 'died' at Applecross in his 80th year.

== Cult ==
Máel Ruba was, after St Columba, perhaps the most popular saint of north-west Scotland. At least twenty-one churches are dedicated to him, and Dean Reeves enumerates about forty forms of his name. His death occurred on 21 April, and in Ireland his feast has always been kept on this day; however, in Scotland (probably owing to the confusion with Saint Rufus) it has also been kept on 27 August. On 5 July 1898, Pope Leo XIII restored his feast for the Catholic Church in Scotland, to be kept on 27 August. In the calendar of saints of the Scottish Episcopal Church he is honoured on 20 April. Because due to a typographical error centuries ago, his feast day was observed on 25 August, and folk etymology led some people to confuse "Summereve's Fair" with a secular fair celebrating the season.

Máel Ruba's name has given rise to numerous corruptions; for example in Keith, Moray, he is referred to as "St Rufus", and St Rufus Church is dedicated to him. In other parts of Scotland, his name was variously rendered as "Maree" (as in the Loch), "Summereve" (i.e., St Maol Rubha) etc. There are several locations named after Máel Ruba such as Loch Maree. He is said to have established a hermitage on Isle Maree.

In the 17th century the Presbytery of Dingwall was disturbed by reports of several rituals, evidently of pagan origin, such as the sacrificing of bulls, on an island in Loch Maree. These revolved round a debased memory of Máel Ruba, whose legacy had perhaps become mixed with an ancient pre-Christian cult of 'God Mourie'.

== Areas where he was celebrated ==
- Applecross and the Loch Broom area.
- Keith, Moray, sometimes referred to anciently as 'Kethmalruff' (Cèith Mhaol Rubha)
- Loch Maree, which has Isle Maree/Eilean Maree in it. The island has a well dedicated to the saint.
- Dingwall and Tain, in Easter Ross both of which held fairs celebrating the saint.
- Amulree Ath Maol Rubha (= Maol Rubha's ford), Perthshire
- Ashaig, on the Isle of Skye

Contin Island, a river islet in Ross and Cromarty; the parish church of Contin is dedicated to St Máel Ruba. There has probably been a church on this site since the 7th or 8th century.

- The chapel of Kilmarie at Kirkton on the Craignish peninsula in Argyll; the chapel is said to have been founded by Máel Ruba, from whom the name Kilmarie is derived.
- The medieval church of Kirkden (formerly Idvies), near Letham, Angus; dedicated to Ruffus or Maelrubha in 1243
- The medieval church of Kinnell, near Friockheim; dedicated to "St Malruib, Confessor"

== See also ==
- Wish Tree: associated with the saint's well.

=== References ===
- Herbermann, Charles, ed. (1913). "St. Maelrubha" . Catholic Encyclopedia. New York: Robert Appleton Company.
- Reeves, William, 'Saint Maelrubha: His History and Churches', in Proceedings of the Society of Antiquaries of Scotland, III (1857–60), pp. 258–96
- Thomson, Derick S. The Companion to Gaelic Scotland, (Blackwell Reference 1987), ISBN 0-631-15578-3
- The Chronicles of Keith
