= Fergie MacDonald =

Scottish accordionist (1937–2024)

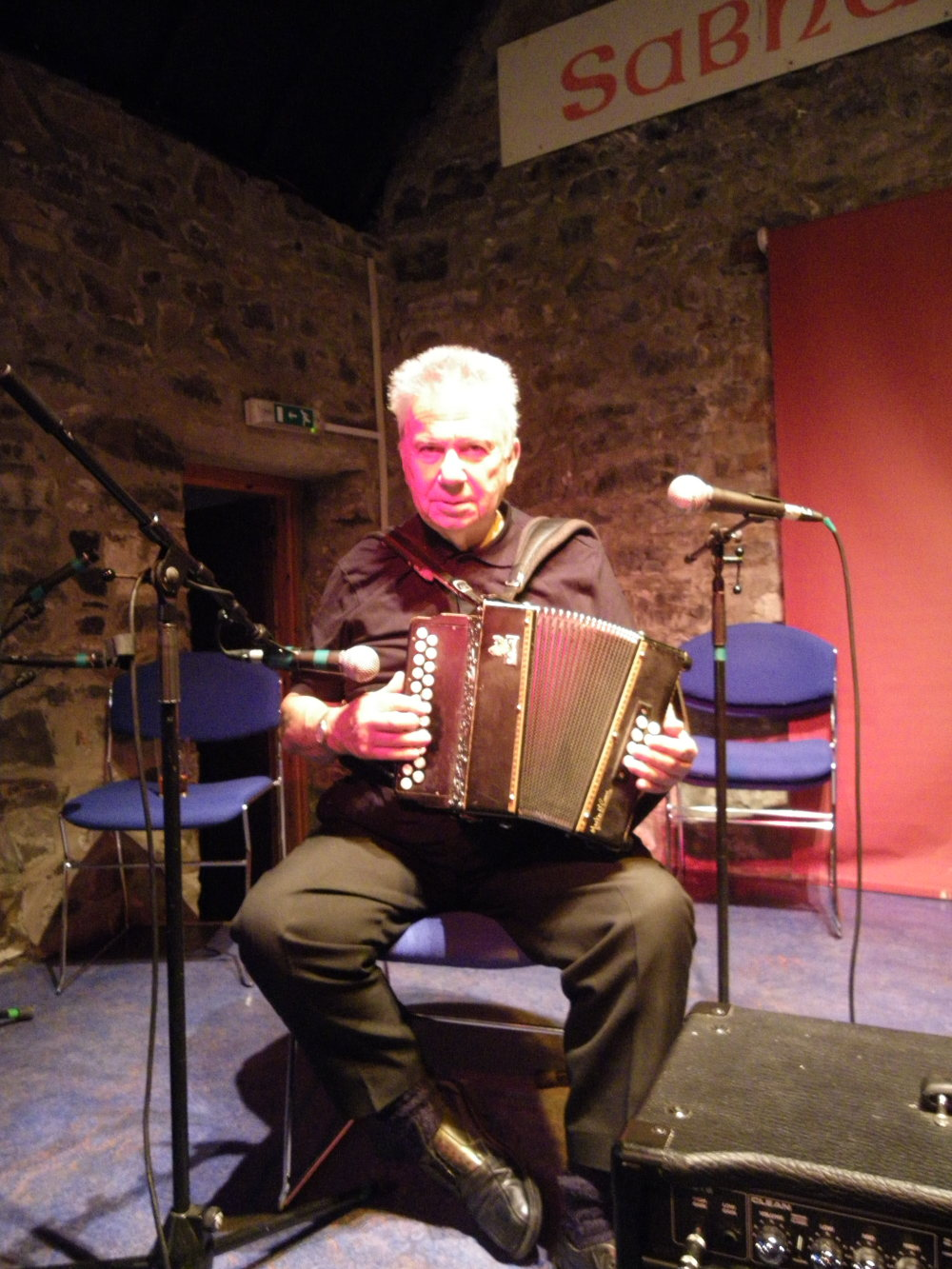
Fergie MacDonald performing in the Great Hall at Sabhal Mòr Ostaig, 2015-07-23

Duncan Ferguson MacDonald MBE (24 April 1937 – 23 April 2024) was a Scottish accordionist who specialised in ceilidh music and played the button accordion. MacDonald is considered to be the man who popularised the West Highland style of traditional Scottish dance music, and has been referred to as the "Ceilidh King".

== Life and career ==
Born in Glasgow, Scotland on 24 April 1937, he was brought up in Moidart he was descended from a direct line of Moidart MacDonald Clanranalds with the 1745 Jacobite rising, the Highland Clearances and Culloden in the genetic mix.

In his youth he played the piano accordion, but struggled with it and moved to the button accordion.

MacDonald topped the Scottish Singles Chart in 1966 with his tune "Loch Maree Islands". He was initially banned from appearing on the BBC due to the traditional audition process, but later became a regular feature on BBC Radio Scotland and BBC Radio nan Gaidheal.

MacDonald toured throughout the world and released 50 albums. He was well known through the tales told by fellow Scottish accordionist Phil Cunningham as part of his stage act.

In 2003, he released his autobiography, Fergie: Memories of a Musical Legend.

In July 2021, he was diagnosed with prostate cancer.

He was appointed a Member of the Order of the British Empire (MBE) in the 2021 New Year Honours for services to Scottish traditional music. In May 2022 he became the oldest person to headline Inverness's Eden Court Theatre when he took part in a special concert to celebrate his MBE.

MacDonald was inducted into the Scottish Traditional Music Hall of Fame, and was a clay pigeon shooter who won 14 caps for Scotland.

MacDonald died on 23 April 2024 at the age of 86.

== Selected discography ==
- It's Scotland's Music – Fergie MacDonald and his Highland Band, Shona SH 7001
- 21st Album: Traditional Ceilidh Music – Fergie MacDonald (1997), Greentrax Recordings
