= SS Mabel =

Small cruise ship built in 1882

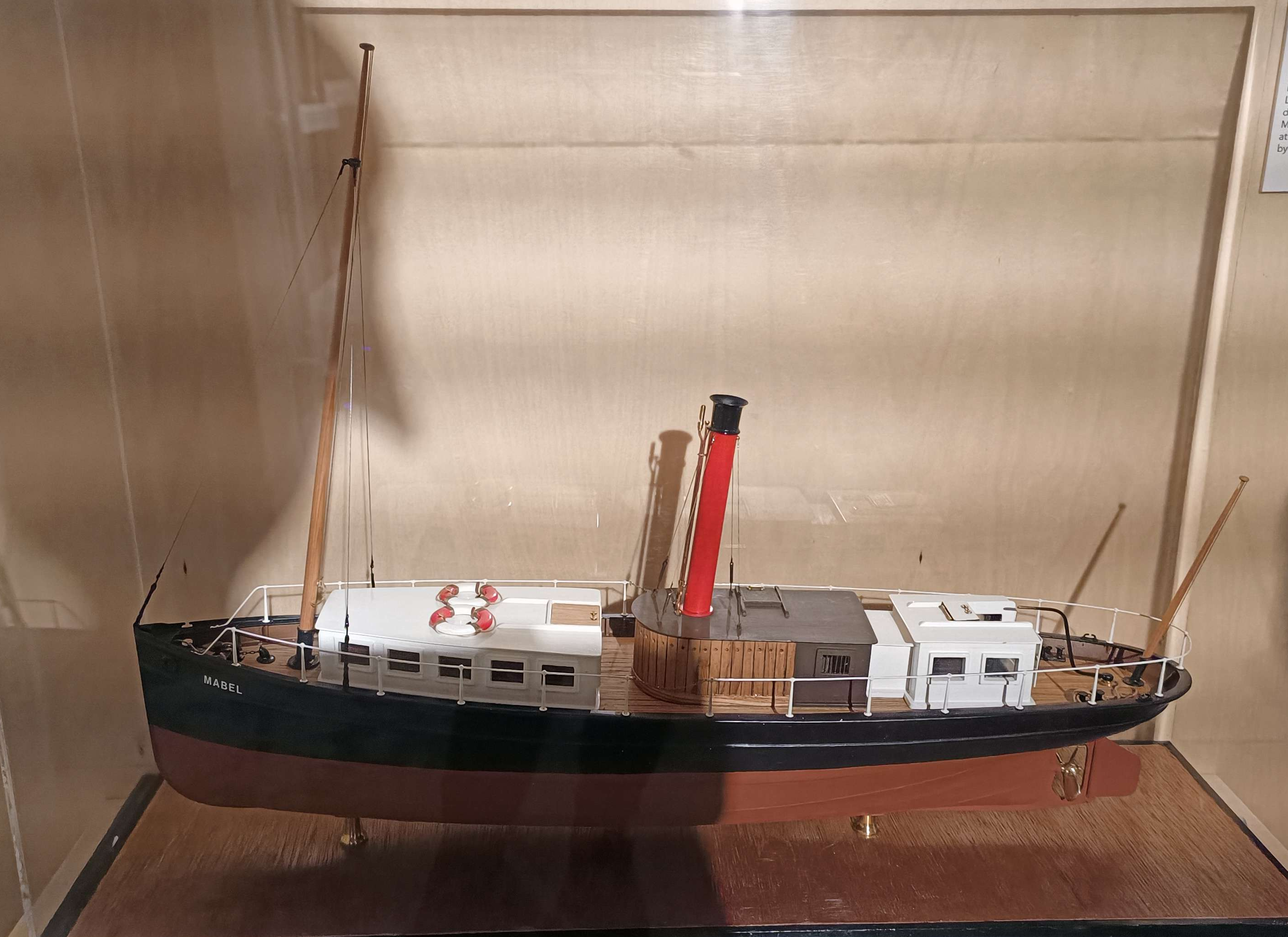
- A model of the SS Mabel at Gairloch Museum.

History
- Name: "Mabel"
- Owner: Loch Maree Hotel
- Ordered: 1882
- Builder: T.B. Seath & Co.
- Launched: 1883
- Out of service: 1911
- Fate: Unknown; likely scrapped.

General characteristics
- Length: 13.7 meters
- Propulsion: 1 × single-screw propeller

SS Mabel was a small cruise ship launched in 1883 and owned by James Hornsby, proprietor of the Loch Maree Hotel, that provided tourists a tour of landlocked Loch Maree, Scotland. Mabel also served as a small passenger ferry between Poolewe (Tollie Bay pier 57.7416°N 5.5815°W ) and Kinlochewe (Rhu Noa pier 57.6285°N 5.3430°W), which connected visitors arriving by coach from Achnasheen railway station.

Hornsby sold Mabel to David MacBrayne, whose steamship operations covered all of west Scotland, in 1887. MacBrayne promoted the vessel as a tourist attraction and it served until 1911, when it was moored up beside Loch Maree Hotel.

In 1913 the vessel was beached near to the hotel, where it remained until about 2000.

A model of Mabel can be seen in the Gairloch Museum, however some photos show the Mabel with slight differences; some show the vessel with tiller steering, while another seems to show passengers at the stern of the ship with a crew member at the wheel on an open bridge.

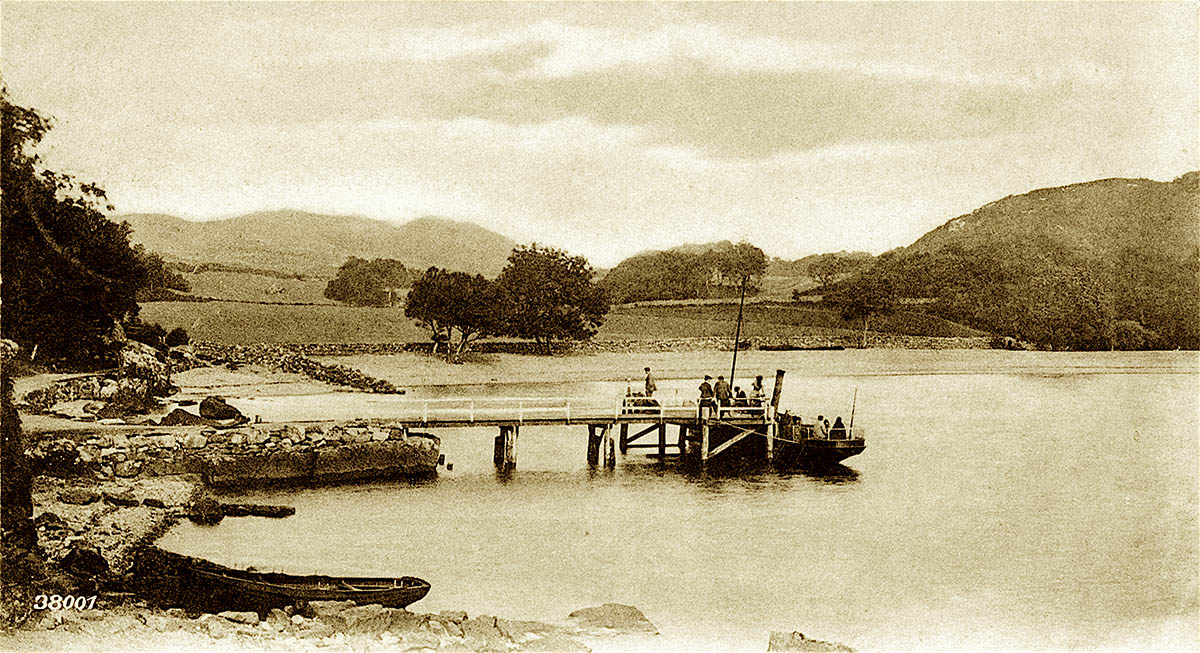
SS "Mabel" at Tollie Bay, north-west end of Loch Maree, 1905
