= Keith, Moray =

Town in Moray, Scotland

Coordinates: 57.543°N 2.952°W

Keith: Scottish Gaelic: Baile Chèith
- Town
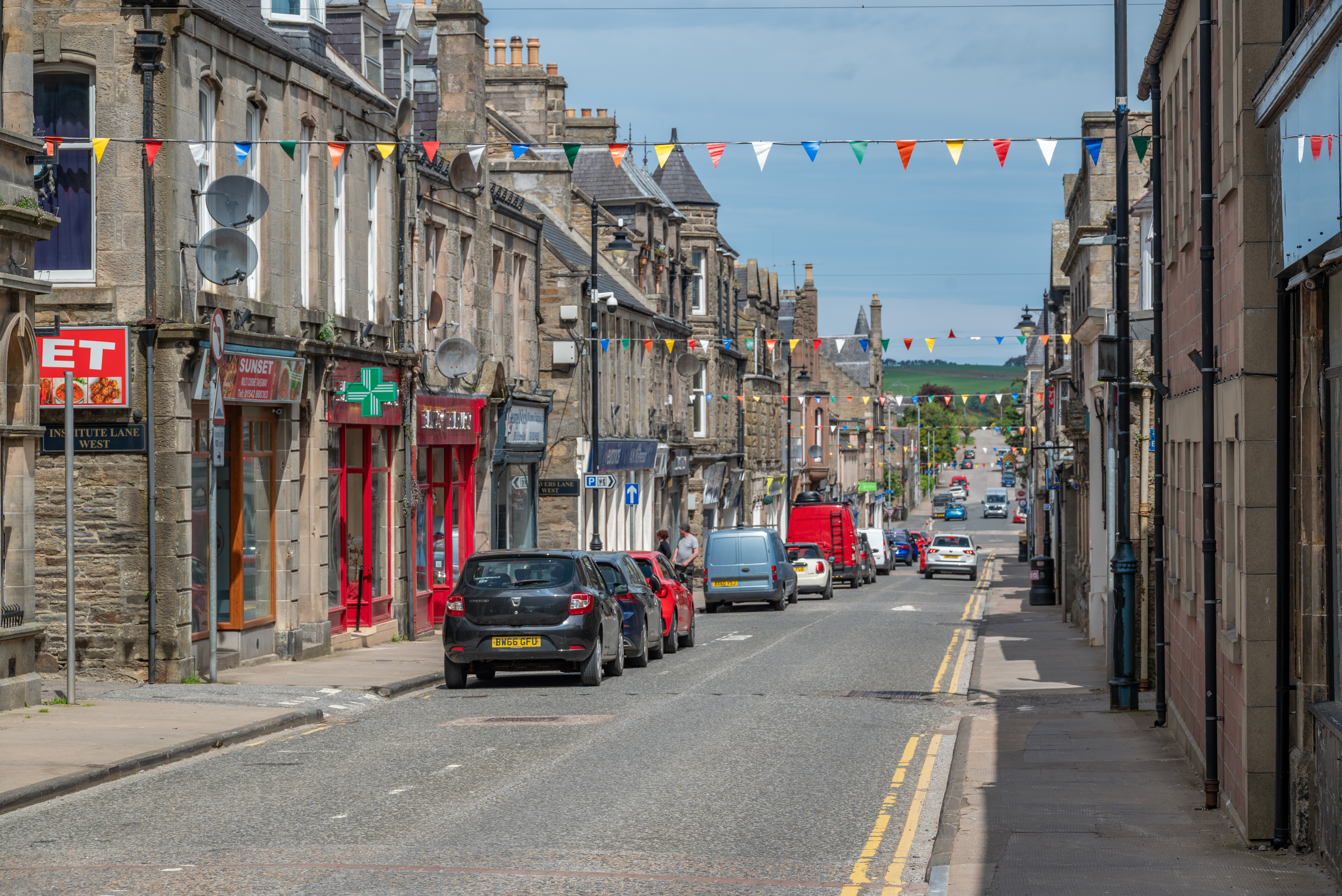
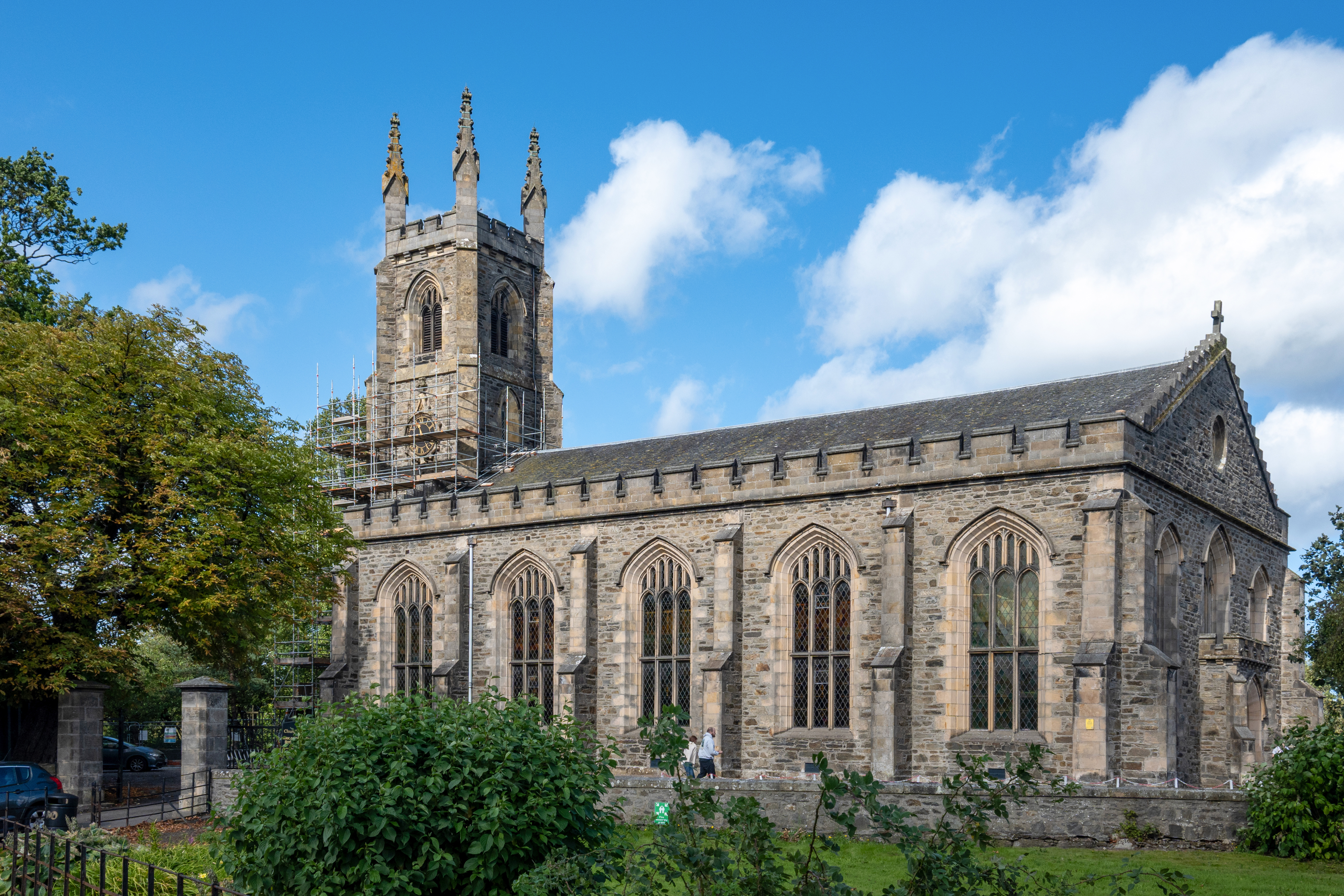
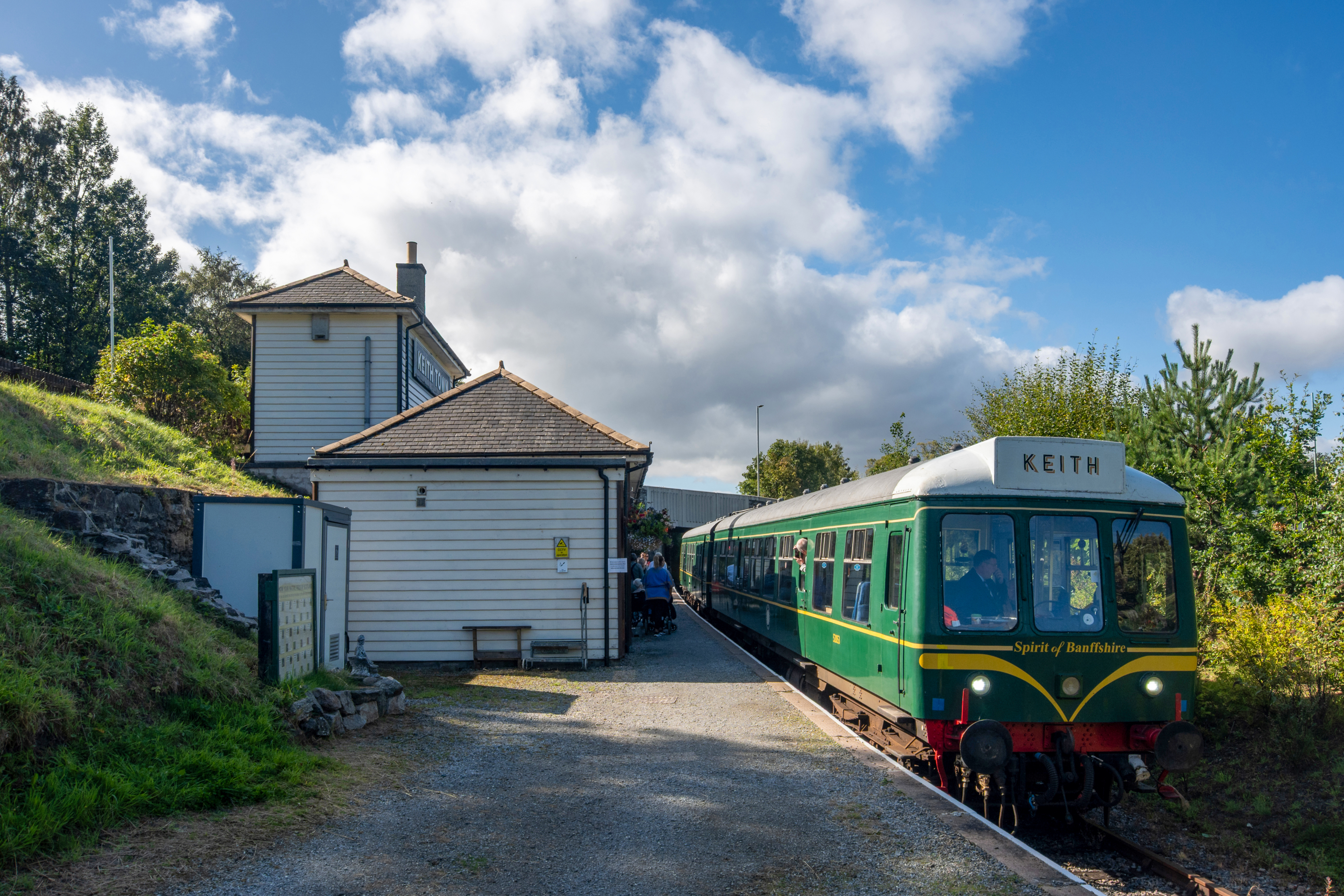
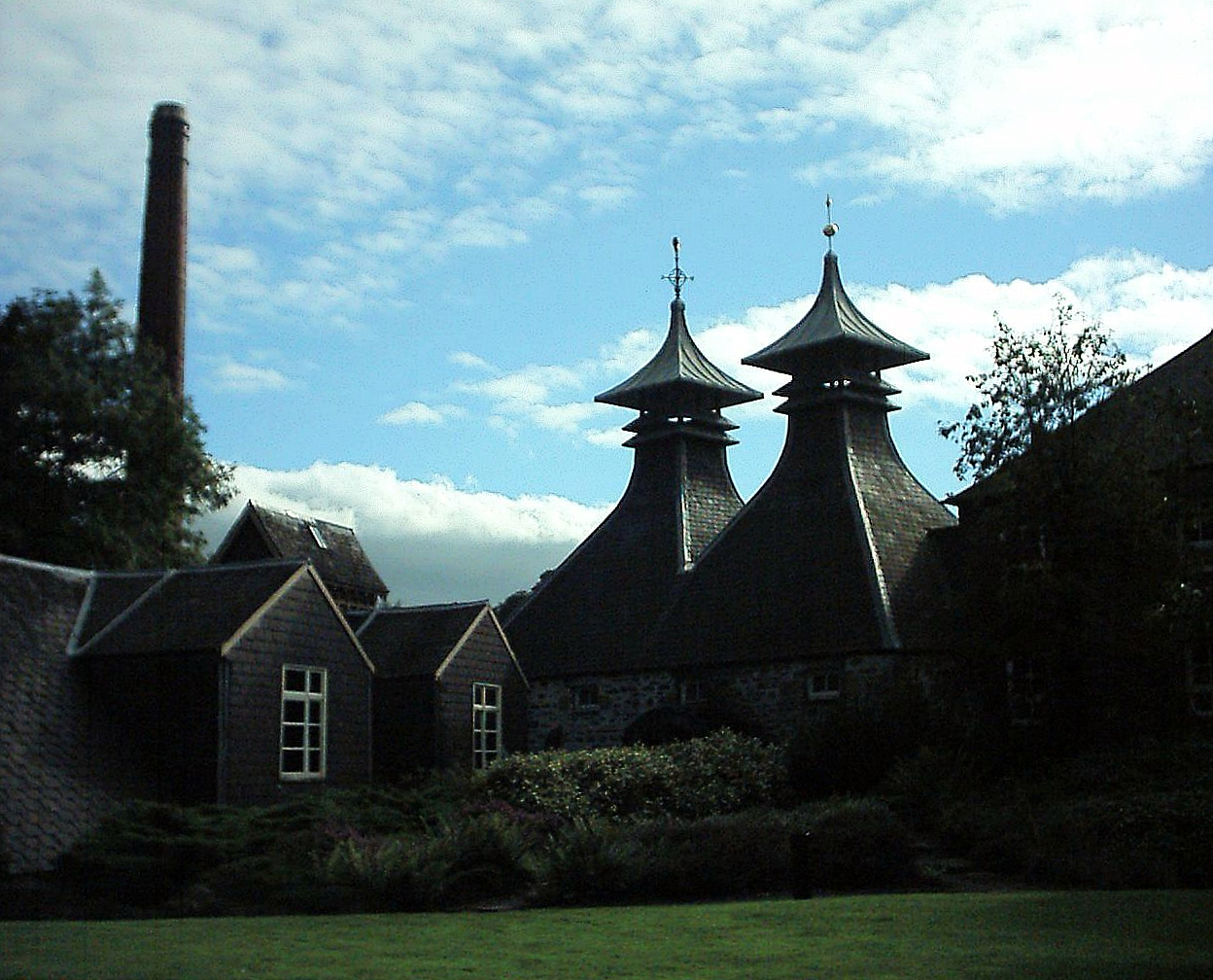
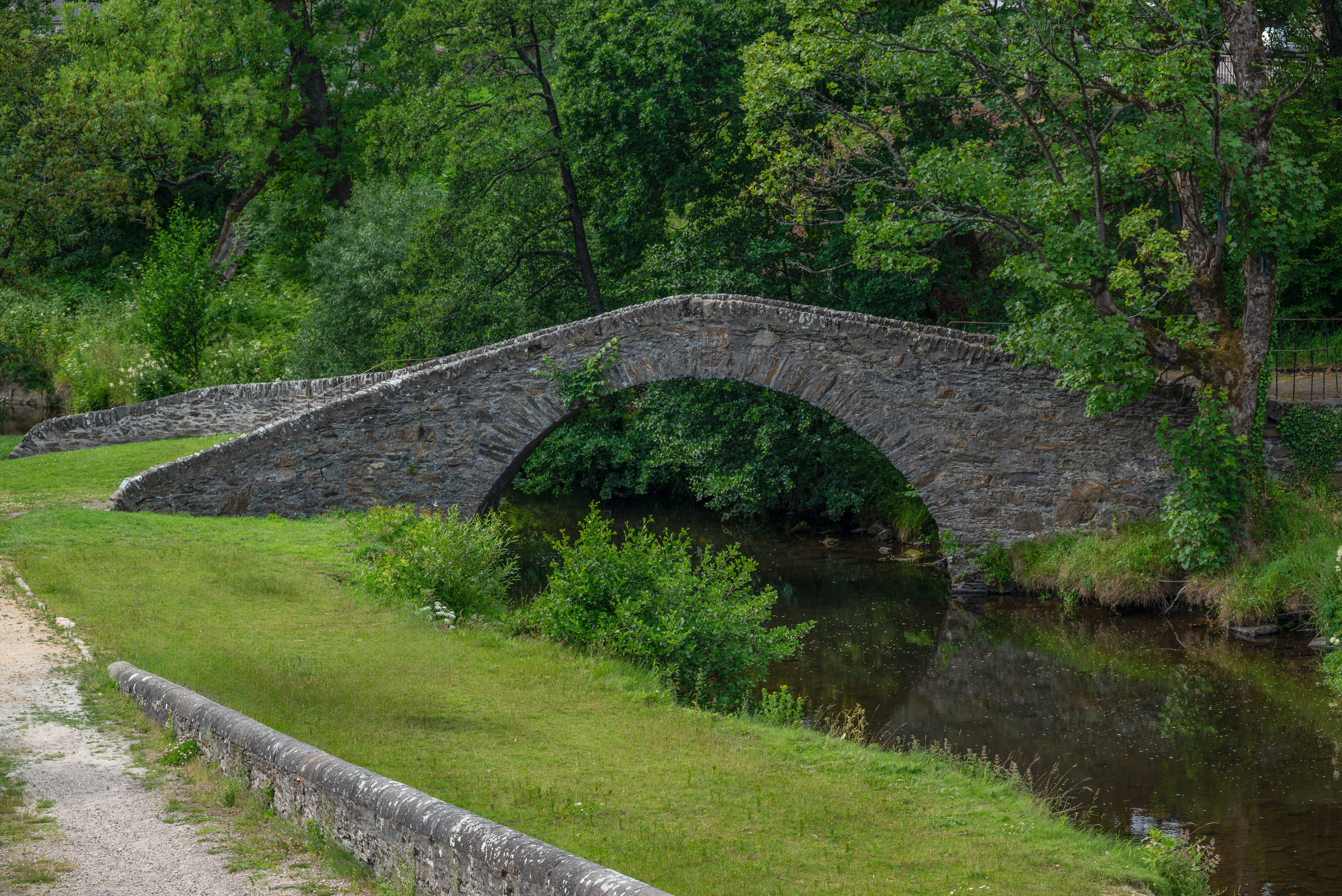
- Mid Street St Rufus Church Keith Town railway station Strathisla distillery Keith Old Bridge

- Location within Moray
- Population: 4,572 (2022)
- OS grid reference: NJ430506
  - Edinburgh: 110 mi (177 km) S
  - London: 432 mi (695 km) SSE
- Council area: Moray
- Lieutenancy area: Banffshire
- Country: Scotland
- Sovereign state: United Kingdom
- Post town: KEITH
- Postcode district: AB55
- Dialling code: 01542
- Police: Scotland
- Fire: Scottish
- Ambulance: Scottish
- UK Parliament: Aberdeenshire North and Moray East
- Scottish Parliament: Moray

Keith (Scottish Gaelic: Baile Chèith, or Cèith Mhaol Rubha (archaic)) is a market town in the Moray council area in north east Scotland. historically in Banffshire, a name which persists in common usage and historical references, It lies on the River Isla, approximately 110 miles (177 km) north of Edinburgh, 126 miles (204 km) northeast of Glasgow, and 15 miles (24 km) southeast of Elgin. It had a population of 4,572 in 2022.

Keith has three distinct sections: Old Town, the original settlement; Keith which is the main commercial centre; and Fife Keith which was originally a separate town built in competition by the Earl of Fife but which, having proved less economically successful, was joined to form one homogeneous settlement separated now only by the river.

The oldest part of Keith dates to around 1180 where the Old Town still remains, now almost indistinguishable from the rest of the town. It developed around the old bridge which was built there by two mourning parents as a permanent memorial their child who drowned in the river at that crossing point in the hope that none should suffer similar loss. The main part of the town is on higher ground above the river, laid out around 1750 by the Earl of Findlater. It is located at the crossing of the A95 and A96 roads. Local services include a health centre, dentist, optician and multiple hairdressing salons. The town has three schools: Keith Grammar School, Keith Primary School and St Thomas RC Primary School.

The annual Keith Country Show, held at Seafield Park, is an event in the farming calendar of north-east Scotland. The village of Newmill is approximately two kilometres (1 1/4 miles) north of Keith.

== History and culture ==
The name appears to come from a Brythonic word meaning "wood" (cf. Welsh coed), but it may also be related to the Pictish territorial division in this area, which was known as Cé.

The Chronicles of Keith, compiled in the 19th century, provide an unusually comprehensive view of the area's history. According to them Keith was originally known as "Kethmalruff", a dedication to Saint Maol Rubha (d. 722), also Latinised as "St Rufus". This dedication to a Celtic Church saint from Bangor Abbey may imply that the parish has Hiberno-Scottish missionary origins, possibly by monks from St Maol Ruba's monastic foundation of Applecross Abbey. The first parish church at Keith (still marked by an ancient graveyard, though the parish church was rebuilt on another site in the early nineteenth century), though no archaeological evidence for this has been identified.

During the Jacobite rising of 1745, the Jacobite Army won a skirmish at Keith on 21 March 1746. A Jacobite force under Major Nicholas Glasgow and Captain Robert Stewart surprised and defeated a Government force, killing over 20 of them. This victory at Keith is a reminder that the Jacobites were continuing to take the initiative in parts of northern Scotland until the Battle of Culloden on 16 April 1746.

The language spoken indigenously round Keith is Doric, which superseded Scottish Gaelic (see language section at Moray).

The town is home of psych/folk/country band, the Carousels, whose track 'Marianne' was used on an advertising campaign for Irn-Bru.

The first Keith Golf Club (now defunct) was founded in 1901. The Second World War saw the demise of the club and the course reverted to farmland.

The Union Street drill hall was completed in around 1908.

== Economy ==
=== Industry ===
The nearby Blackhillock electrical substation is the landing point for a 1200 MW high-voltage direct current Caithness - Moray Link. Another cable, the 550 MW Shetland HVDC Connection was planned to reach Blackhillock, but was moved to Spittal instead.

=== Tourist attractions ===
The town is at the start of Scotland's Malt Whisky Trail, and has three distilleries: Strathmill, Glenkeith and Strathisla distillery, one of the oldest in the Highlands and since 1950 headquarters of Chivas Brothers, producers of Chivas Regal. Within the town's immediate environs there may also be found Auchroisk, Aultmore and Glentauchers. The Keith and Dufftown Railway is an 11-mile (18-kilometre) heritage railway running to Dufftown.

The Keith Heritage Group have published a number of maps that lead visitors on walking tours through the town and surrounding countryside.

Two annual events attract tourists to Keith. The first of these, the TMSA Keith Festival, falls on the second weekend of June and celebrates the traditional (and not so traditional) music of the area, providing entertainment in the form of concerts, ceilidhs, competitions and sessions. On the second weekend of August the town hosts the Keith Country Show. The show was founded in 1872 and every year promises days of prize-winning livestock and family fun.

The Seabury Chair, the chair on which Robert Kilgour, Bishop of Aberdeen and Primus of Scotland sat when he consecrated Samuel Seabury, the first Episcopal bishop in the Americas, is preserved in Holy Trinity Episcopal Church.

== Climate ==
Keith has an oceanic climate (Köppen: Cfb).

Climate data for Keith (142 m or 466 ft asl, averages 1991–2020)
Month	Jan	Feb	Mar	Apr	May	Jun	Jul	Aug	Sep	Oct	Nov	Dec	Year
Mean daily maximum °C (°F)	6.1 (43.0)	6.9 (44.4)	8.8 (47.8)	11.5 (52.7)	14.2 (57.6)	16.3 (61.3)	18.7 (65.7)	18.3 (64.9)	16.1 (61.0)	12.3 (54.1)	8.6 (47.5)	6.1 (43.0)	12.0 (53.6)
Daily mean °C (°F)	2.9 (37.2)	3.3 (37.9)	4.8 (40.6)	7.2 (45.0)	9.6 (49.3)	12.2 (54.0)	14.3 (57.7)	13.9 (57.0)	11.9 (53.4)	8.5 (47.3)	5.2 (41.4)	2.7 (36.9)	8.1 (46.6)
Mean daily minimum °C (°F)	−0.3 (31.5)	−0.3 (31.5)	0.7 (33.3)	2.9 (37.2)	5.1 (41.2)	8.0 (46.4)	9.9 (49.8)	9.5 (49.1)	7.6 (45.7)	4.8 (40.6)	1.8 (35.2)	−0.7 (30.7)	4.1 (39.4)
Average precipitation mm (inches)	62.6 (2.46)	55.9 (2.20)	54.9 (2.16)	59.9 (2.36)	61.6 (2.43)	91.6 (3.61)	73.2 (2.88)	81.2 (3.20)	83.6 (3.29)	109.5 (4.31)	89.7 (3.53)	65.2 (2.57)	888.8 (34.99)
Average rainy days (≥ 1.0 mm)	14.3	12.1	12.4	11.6	11.5	13.5	13.4	14.0	12.3	15.8	15.7	14.0	160.6
Mean monthly sunshine hours	49.6	83.0	114.4	150.1	199.6	149.8	155.4	145.4	120.0	87.8	58.5	36.9	1,350.6
Source: Met Office

== Education ==
The town is served by Keith Grammar School, Keith Primary School and St Thomas' School.

== Sports facilities ==
Keith has an 18-hole golf course, three tennis courts, a bowling club, skate park and a large sports hall. The swimming pool has been refurbished with a gym and sauna room added to the facilities. Keith Cricket Club play their home games at Fife Park. Keith also has multiple football pitches in the area. One official pitch, Kynoch Park, which is home to Keith F.C., Simpson Park which is owned by Keith & District Sports Trust is where Islavale F.C. play their home games.

== Transport ==
Keith railway station provides connections to Inverness and Aberdeen and the local railway provides travel to Dufftown as part of Scotland's Malt Whisky Trail. Stagecoach Bluebird operate bus services which provide hourly transport to Inverness city centre & Aberdeen Union Square bus station including local towns along the A96. From June 5th 2025 , Ember (coach operator) has been providing hourly pre-booked connections to Inverness and Aberdeen using a demand-responsive transport model.

== Notable residents ==
- Brian Adam, former Member of the Scottish Parliament
- James Gordon Bennett, Sr., founder and publisher of the New York Herald
- George Foulkes, former Member of the Scottish Parliament
- Colin Hendry, footballer
- Irvine Laidlaw, businessman and life peer
- William Macmillan, 1991 Moderator of the General Assembly of the Church of Scotland
- James Naughtie, BBC Radio broadcaster
- Isabella Gordon, marine biologist and recipient of an OBE
- John Ogilvie, post-Reformation saint and martyr of the illegal and underground Catholic Church in Scotland
- John Ripley, recipient of the Victoria Cross
- George Sellar, recipient of the Victoria Cross
