= River Isla, Moray =

River in Moray and Aberdeenshire, Scotland

River Isla
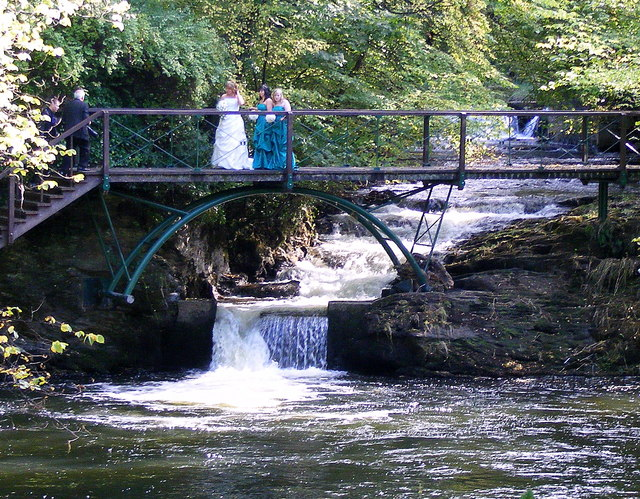
- Waterfalls on the River Isla near Keith
- Native name: Uisge Ìle (Scottish Gaelic)

Location
- Country: Scotland

Physical characteristics
- Source
  - location: northeast of Auchindoun
- Mouth: River Deveron
  - coordinates: 57.51553°N 2.77834°W

The River Isla (Scottish Gaelic: Uisge Ìle) is a tributary of the River Deveron in North-East Scotland. The area surrounding it is known as Strathisla (Scottish Gaelic: Srath Ìle, not to be confused with Glenisla, which is around the River Isla in Perthshire).

It rises to the northeast of Milltown of Auchindoun and flows northeastwards for 18 miles (29 km) through Strathisla, separating Keith from Fife-Keith, and then forms the boundary between Moray and Aberdeenshire for a short distance before joining the Deveron near Rothiemay.

The Isla Way is a 13 mile walking route along the river.
