= Droman, Sutherland =

Coordinates: 58.485°N 5.110°W

Droman: Scottish Gaelic: An Droman
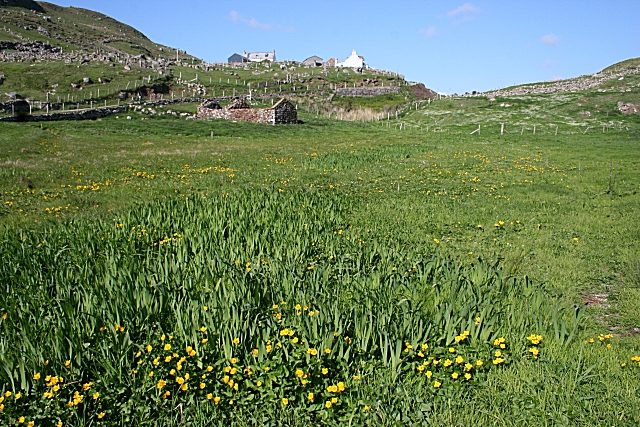
- Droman above the pier.

- Location within the Sutherland area
- OS grid reference: NC216576
- Council area: Highland
- Lieutenancy area: Sutherland
- Country: Scotland
- Sovereign state: United Kingdom
- Post town: Rhiconich
- Postcode district: IV27 4
- Police: Scotland
- Fire: Scottish
- Ambulance: Scottish

Droman is a small remote crofting township on the north west coast of Lairg in Sutherland, Scottish Highlands and is in the Scottish council area of Highland.

The hamlets of Balchrick, Blairmore, Oldshore Beg and Oldshoremore are all located with 0.5 miles of Blairmore and are reached along the coast road from the south, which passes through Achriesgill, Badcall and Kinlochbervie to reach Blairmore from Rhiconich. There are views from the township of the Outer Hebrides.
