= Oldshore Beg =

Coordinates: 58.47646°N 5.08427°W

Oldshore Beg: Scottish Gaelic: Àisir Beag
- Location within the Sutherland area
- OS grid reference: NC202583
- Council area: Highland
- Lieutenancy area: Sutherland
- Country: Scotland
- Sovereign state: United Kingdom
- Post town: Rhiconich
- Postcode district: IV27 4
- Police: Scotland
- Fire: Scottish
- Ambulance: Scottish

Oldshore Beg is a remote crofting township, in western Sutherland, Scottish Highlands and is in the Scottish council area of Highland.

The hamlets of Balchrick, Droman, Blairmore and Oldshoremore are all located within 1/2 mile (800 metres) of Oldshore Beg and are reached along the coast road from the south which passes through Achriesgill, Badcall and Kinlochbervie to reach Oldshore Beg from Rhiconich.

Oldshore Beg overlooks the small island of Eilean an Ròin Mòr which is uninhabited.
