= Blairmore, Sutherland =

Coordinates: 58.49064°N 5.08118°W

Blairmore: Scottish Gaelic: Am Blàr Mòr
- Location within the Sutherland area
- OS grid reference: NC205599
- Council area: Highland
- Lieutenancy area: Sutherland
- Country: Scotland
- Sovereign state: United Kingdom
- Post town: Lairg
- Postcode district: IV27 4
- Police: Scotland
- Fire: Scottish
- Ambulance: Scottish

Blairmore is a small remote crofting hamlet, on the north west coast of Lairg in Sutherland, Scottish Highlands and is in the Scottish council area of Highland.

The hamlets of Balchrick, Droman, Oldshore Beg and Oldshoremore are all located with 0.5 miles of Blairmore and are reached along the coast road from the south which passes through Achriesgill, Badcall and Kinlochbervie to reach Blairmore from Rhiconich.
