= Loch Dionard =

Loch in Northern Scotland

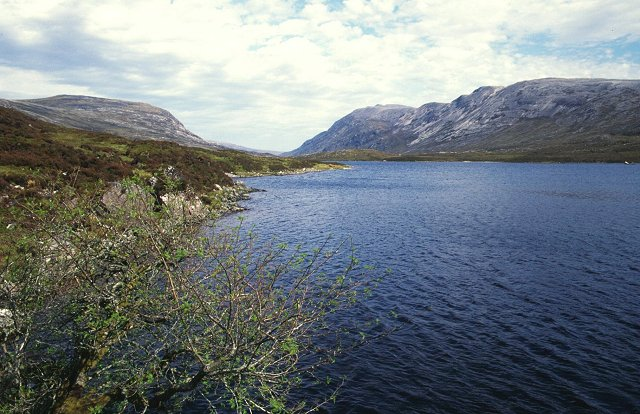
- Loch Dionard

- Location within Sutherland
- Location: Scotland
- Coordinates: 58°23′57″N 4°48′52″W
- Primary inflows: Allt an Easain Ghill
- Primary outflows: Dionard River
- Basin countries: United Kingdom
- Settlements: None

Loch Dionard is a medium-sized loch in the Durness Parish, in Sutherland, Highland Council Area, Northern Scotland. It is in the North-Western Highlands about four miles (six kilometres) south of Polla.

== Access ==
Loch Dionard is six miles (ten kilometres) from the settlements of Eriboll, Rhiconich, Achriesgill and Alltnacaillich, that do not have direct road access to the loch. There are two small roads connecting tourist cottages and mountain trains/portages in the area, to the rest of Scotland. The road to the south provides a link to Alltnacaillich and the nearest paved road; the route is about 11 miles (18 km), 9 miles (14 km) of which are on narrow, bumpy gravel tracks through mountainous terrain. The nearest settlement with commercial services is Tongue. The other road is a small dirt track, to the north of the loch unconnected to the southerly route. It follows the banks of the River Dionard to Gualin House and the A838 6 miles (10 km) away, with access to Durness 11 miles (18 km) further north.

== Geography ==
Loch Dionard is 357 feet (108.81 m) above standard sea level, which is relatively high for a loch, but far from any mountain peaks. As a result, it is a consolidation point for many rivers and streams that run from the mountains into the Atlantic Ocean. The most notable river flowing into Loch Dionard is the Allt an Eassain Ghil which provides water, from An Dubh-Loch and Lochan Ulbha which themselves bring in water from the mountain peaks of Sabhal Mor, Meall Horn, Creagan Meall Horn, Coire Lochan Ulbha. Other rivers include Allt Creag Urbhard, from An t-Sail Mhor, Allt Horn and Allt Eilidh a' Chleirich. The latter gets water from Loch Sgeireach, which gets water, from Creag Staonsaid, which also flows into Loch Staonsaid and Meall a Lochain Sgeireach. Finally, there is water flowing from Loch Fir Dhuirinis, which also gets its water from Creag Staonsaid flowing into the east of the Loch alongside the Allt nan Caraichean Duibh.

Flowing outward, only the River Dionard which is more notable and larger than any of the aforementioned rivers; it is the main inflow to the Kyle of Durness, which leads to the Atlantic Ocean. The river is the main water source for the settlements of Gualin House, Carbreck and Lairg.

== Tourism ==
There are a few cottages in the area around Loch Dionard, and the river southward has fishing and tourist destinations. There are also a few heritage paths and trails in the area but, due to its isolation and the much more accessible Loch Awe (25 mi or 40 km away on the A837), Loch Dionard remains isolated.
