= Loch Aisir Mòr =

Lake in Highland, Scotland

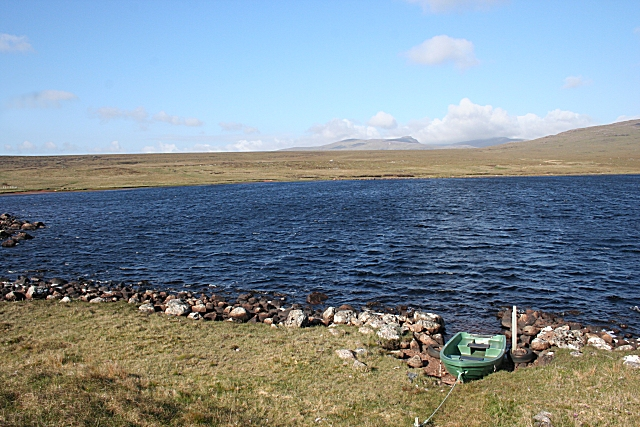
- Loch Aisir Mòr, from its southwest shore

- Location within Sutherland
- Location: Scottish Highlands
- Coordinates: 58°29′1″N 5°3′50″W
- Primary inflows: Allt na Fèithe Buidhe, Alltan an t-Saic, Allt an Lòin Bhàin
- Primary outflows: Amhainn Aisir Mhòr
- Basin countries: Scotland, United Kingdom
- Max. length: 668 m (2,192 ft)
- Max. width: 361 m (1,184 ft)
- Surface elevation: 50 m (160 ft)

Loch Aisir Mòr is a lochan (small loch) in Scotland's Flow Country. It is situated about one mile from the western coast of Sutherland, at the northeast edge of Oldshoremore, a scattered crofting settlement, and about two miles north of the larger settlement of Kinlochbervie. The lochan is surrounded by heathland. A claybed lines its north shore. Its outflow to the sea is Abhainn Aisir Mhòr, a river about one mile long.

Its name means "Loch of the Big Pass" in Scottish Gaelic, perhaps referring to the gap between the hills of Eilear na Mola and Cnoc na Bearaich through which the river flows.

The loch appears in the photography collections of Scottish botanist Robert M. Adam, dated 1953.

The Rhiconich Estate allows fly fishing for the local angling club from the loch's shores.
