= Cape Wrath =

Cape in Scotland

Cape Wrath Am Parbh (Scottish Gaelic)
- Cape
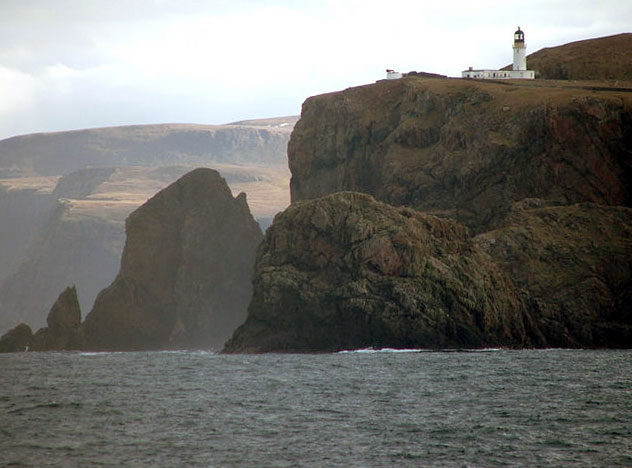
- Cape Wrath from the sea

- Location within Scotland
- Coordinates: 58.62°N 5.00°W
- Location: Scottish Highlands

Cape Wrath /ˈræθ/ (Scottish Gaelic: Am Parbh, known as An Carbh in Lewis) is a cape in the Durness parish of the county of Sutherland in the Highlands of Scotland. It is the most north-westerly point in mainland Great Britain.

The cape is separated from the rest of the mainland by the Kyle of Durness and consists of 107 square miles (280 square kilometres) of moorland wilderness known as the Parph. The first road was built in 1828 by the lighthouse commission across the Parph/Durness. This road connects a passenger ferry that crosses the Kyle of Durness with the buildings on the peninsula.

Much of the cape is owned by the Ministry of Defence and is used as a military training area, including as live firing range. Areas of it are also designated as a Site of Special Scientific Interest, a Special Protection Area, a Special Area of Conservation and a Special Landscape Area.

== Etymology ==
The name Cape Wrath is derived from Old Norse hvarf ("turning point"), accordingly, wrath is pronounced /ˈræθ/ (a as in cat). The Norse are believed to have used the cape as a navigation point where they would turn their ships.

== History ==
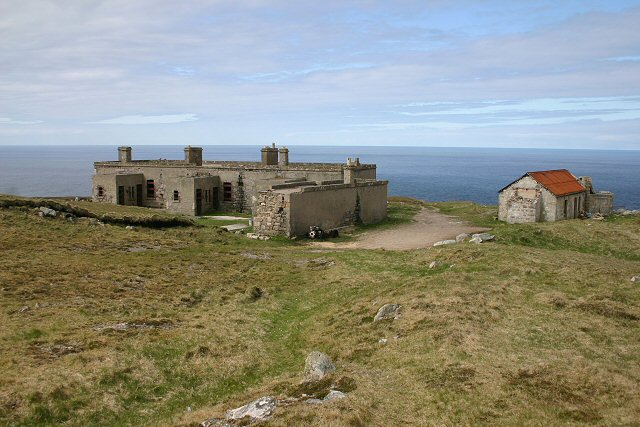
Former Lloyds signal station, Cape Wrath

Cape Wrath was once the home of a series of small crofting communities, although by 1845 the only families remaining on the Parph were those of shepherds. In the 1930s it supported a population of 30 to 40 people, including a small side school at Achiemore which had up to ten pupils in the 1930s but closed in 1947. Building remains at locations such as Kearvaig have been dated to the 18th century. The Cape has few archaeological remains which can be dated to earlier than this, although a promontory fort at Eilean nan Caorach to the east of the headland may date to the late prehistoric age.

Much of the area has been used for sheep grazing, a use which continues today, and shielings, shelters built for shepherds, can be found across the Cape. The area declined in population in the mid-20th century and is now almost entirely unpopulated, although military and tourism use continues. The Cape Wrath Lighthouse was built in 1828 and the access road from the Kyle of Durness dates from the same period. A Lloyd's of London signal station was built close to the lighthouse at the end of the 19th century to track shipping around the Cape.

On 27 September 1915, while sailing for Scapa Flow, HMS Caribbean, known as RMS Dunottar Castle before being requisitioned for wartime service, foundered off Cape Wrath in bad weather. A tow by HMS Birkenhead was unsuccessful, and 15 died. An inquiry later blamed the ship's carpenter for being insufficiently familiar with the ship and for failing to shut all the scuttles. Like most of the crew, he had joined the ship just ten days earlier. The wreck was found in 2004, 30 nautical miles (55 kilometres) off Cape Wrath, in 96 metres (315 ft; 52 fathoms) of water and undisturbed except for fishing nets.

== Geography ==
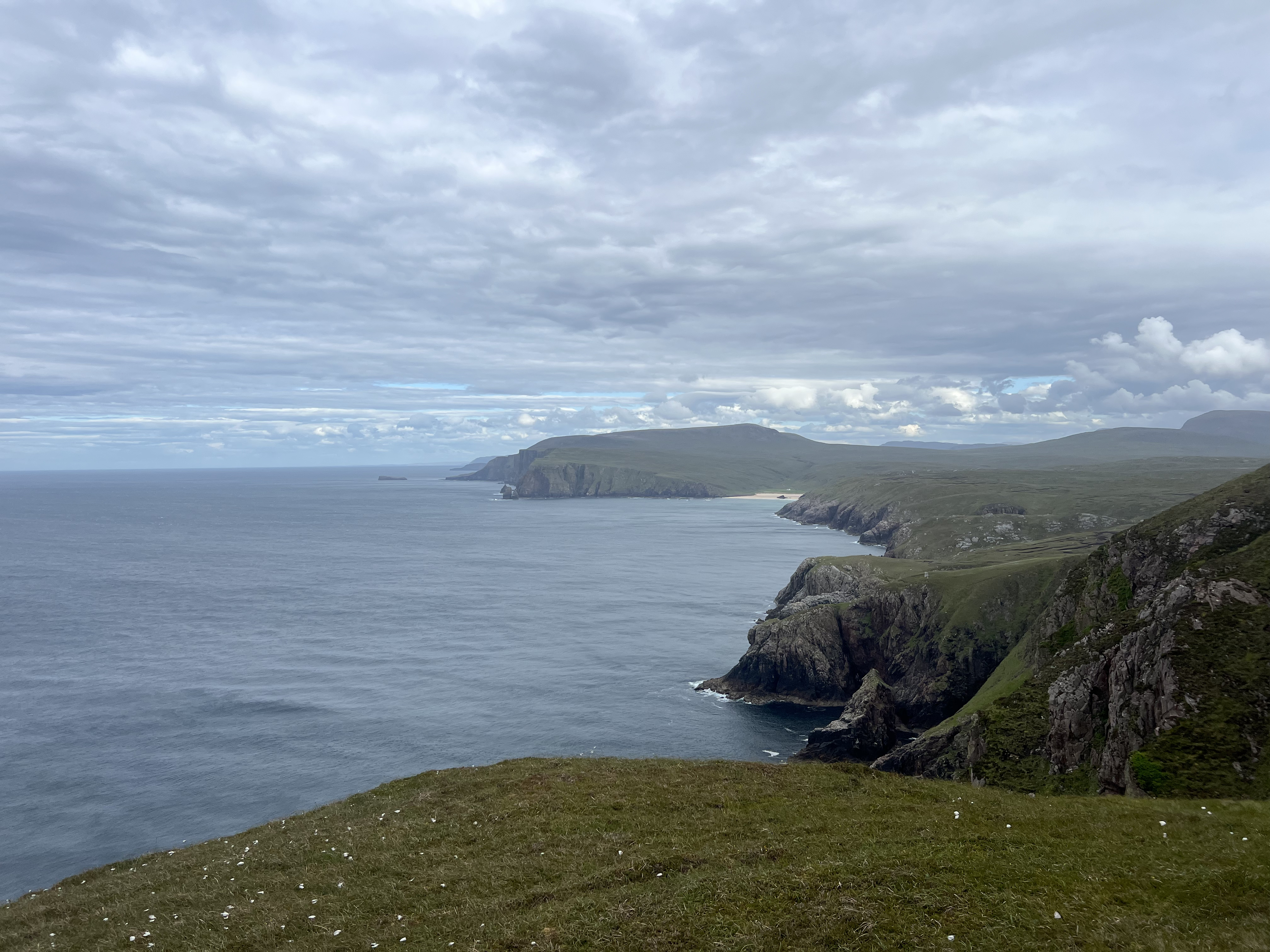
Cliffs east of Cape Wrath

Cape Wrath is located in the traditional county of Sutherland within Highland Region. Durness is the closest village, 10 mi (16 km) southeast with Inverness around 120 mi (200 km) to the south.

The sea cliffs around the cape are composed of Torridonian sandstone and Lewisian gneiss. These rise to 281 m (922 ft) above sea level and include the highest sea cliffs on the British mainland at Clò Mòr around four miles (six kilometres) to the east of the headland. Sea stacks, such as Stac an Dùnain at the cape itself and Stac Clò Kearvaig to the east, rise out of the sea off the coastline, with Duslic, a reef, 5/8 mi (1.0 km) north of the cape. The cape is part of the North West Highlands Geopark, a 2,000 km^{2} (770 sq mi) area with UNESCO geopark status.

Crofting townships of two or three houses with associated enclosures existed at Daill, Achiemore, Kearvaig and Inshore into the mid-20th century. The land originally formed part of the Sutherland estates owned by the Duke of Sutherland. An area of 25,000 acres (10,000 hectares), covering almost all of the northern part of the peninsula, is owned by the Ministry of Defence for use as a military training area.

=== Climate ===
As with the rest of the British Isles, Cape Wrath has an Oceanic (Köppen Cfb) climate. This is especially pronounced due to its western coastal location.

Its exposed northerly position can give rise to some exceptionally low winter sunshine levels: in January 1983 it recorded just 38 minutes of sunshine, a record low for Scotland. This exposed position, however, also means severe frost is rare compared to inland locations such as Altnaharra or Kinbrace. The record low of −6.9 °C (19.6 °F) is comparable to those recorded in Shetland, the Hebrides and the Scilly Isles of England. A slight föhn effect can also occur with the right angle of southerly winds, exemplified by the record December high of 17.7 °C (63.9 °F).

Strong winds can be a feature of weather conditions at the cape, with gusts of 140 mph (230 km/h) recorded.

Climate data for Cape Wrath
Month	Jan	Feb	Mar	Apr	May	Jun	Jul	Aug	Sep	Oct	Nov	Dec	Year
Record high °C (°F)	16.1 (61.0)	13.9 (57.0)	17.8 (64.0)	19.1 (66.4)	24.4 (75.9)	25.6 (78.1)	26.0 (78.8)	26.9 (80.4)	23.9 (75.0)	22.2 (72.0)	16.0 (60.8)	17.7 (63.9)	26.9 (80.4)
Mean daily maximum °C (°F)	6.5 (43.7)	6.3 (43.3)	6.9 (44.4)	8.0 (46.4)	10.8 (51.4)	12.2 (54.0)	14.2 (57.6)	14.6 (58.3)	12.9 (55.2)	11.0 (51.8)	8.5 (47.3)	7.3 (45.1)	9.9 (49.9)
Mean daily minimum °C (°F)	2.3 (36.1)	2.2 (36.0)	2.6 (36.7)	3.8 (38.8)	6.1 (43.0)	8.0 (46.4)	10.0 (50.0)	10.5 (50.9)	9.0 (48.2)	7.0 (44.6)	4.4 (39.9)	3.1 (37.6)	5.8 (42.4)
Record low °C (°F)	−6 (21)	−6.9 (19.6)	−4.5 (23.9)	−6 (21)	−2 (28)	1.6 (34.9)	4.0 (39.2)	4.1 (39.4)	2.5 (36.5)	−0.5 (31.1)	−3 (27)	−5.1 (22.8)	−6.9 (19.6)
Average precipitation mm (inches)	131.5 (5.18)	77.7 (3.06)	101.49 (4.00)	62.87 (2.48)	55.43 (2.18)	70.49 (2.78)	82.91 (3.26)	100.44 (3.95)	139.62 (5.50)	138.28 (5.44)	160.95 (6.34)	138.31 (5.45)	1,259.99 (49.62)
Mean monthly sunshine hours	25.4	61.1	92.4	133.3	182.2	159.3	132.3	136.4	96.1	67.0	30.7	17.7	1,133.9
Source 1: YR.NO
Source 2: Royal Dutch Meteorological Institute/KNMI; 112 m (367 ft) above sea level, 1971–2000, Extremes 1960–2000

== Natural environment ==
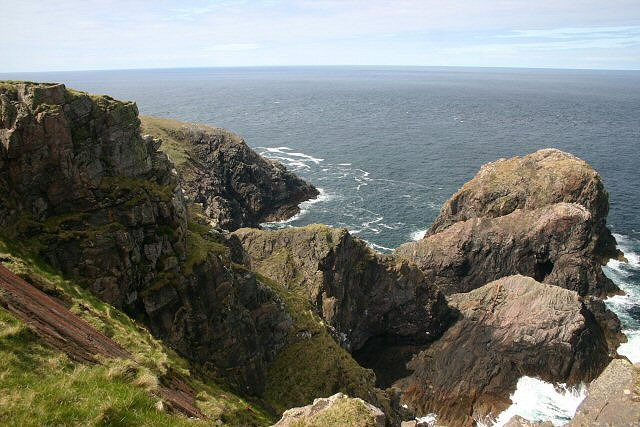
Cliffs at Cape Wrath

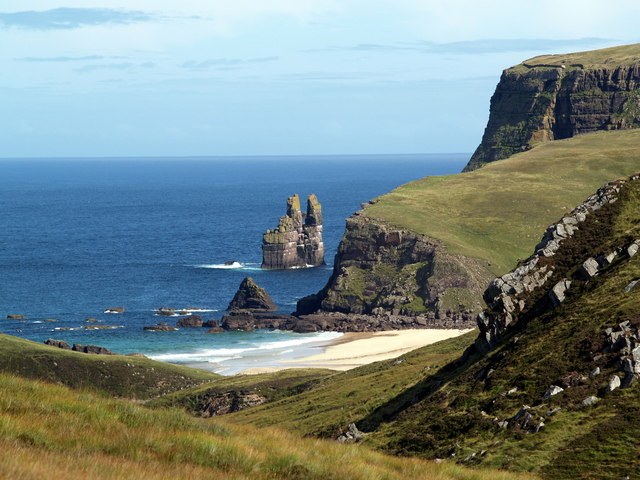
Stack Clò Kearvaig and Kearvaig beach

Because its landscape is largely untouched by man, Cape Wrath has a wide diversity of wildlife, including red deer, hooded crow, rock pipit, golden eagle, cormorant and gannet. An area of 1,019.2 hectares (2,518 acres) is designated as a Special Protection Area (SPA) and a Site of Special Scientific Interest (SSSI). The cliffs around the cape are an internationally important nesting site for over 50000 seabirds, including colonies of puffin Fratercula arctica, razorbill Alca torda, guillemot Uria aalge, kittiwake Rissa tridactyla and fulmar Fulmarus glacialis. The SPA extends 2 km (1 1/4 mi) out to sea and includes the sea bed and marine environment which is a source of food for the bird population of the area.

Numbers of seabirds in the area saw significant declines in the early 21st century with puffin numbers falling by 50%. An area of 1,015.2 hectares (2,509 acres) is also designated as a Special Area of Conservation. Marine species present in the area include harbour porpoise, common seal and bottle-nosed dolphin as well as species such as sea squirts and sponges.

The cliff-top vegetation at sites such as Clò Mòr includes common scurvygrass Cochlearia officinalis and a wide range of habitats are present. These include cliff-top sand dunes at the cape itself as well as montane habitats found at sea level.

An area of 123 km^{2} (47 sq mi) around the coastline is designated as a Special Landscape Area. This area extends from Oldshoremore in the south-west to Durness in the east and includes the entire coastline of the cape area. Just offshore is Stac Clò Kearvaig, also known as "The Cathedral" due to the appearance of two spires and a natural window created by erosion. To the east lies Garvie Island (An Garbh-eilean), one of the main targets for live firing by the military.

Inland the landscape is primarily covered in peat and is often boggy with difficult terrain and a number of lochans, the largest of which, Loch Airigh na Beinne, is around 0.6 square kilometres (1/4 sq mi) in area. The area has been described as one of the few coastal wildernesses in Britain. Plant species include heather Calluna vulgaris, juniper Juniperus communis and ferns.

== Cape Wrath Lighthouse ==
The lighthouse at Cape Wrath was built in 1828 by Robert Stevenson and was staffed until 1998, when it was converted to automatic operation by the Northern Lighthouse Board. The lighthouse, which is a Category A listed building, is a 20 m (66 ft) tall white-washed tower built of granite with a single storey semi-circular base building. The light, which is 122 m (400 ft) above sea level, is visible for 22 nautical miles (41 kilometres).

A complex of buildings close to the lighthouse were built by Lloyd's of London between 1894 and 1903 as a signal station to track shipping around the Cape. This closed in 1932, although the buildings were reused at the start of World War II as a coastguard station.

== Military use ==
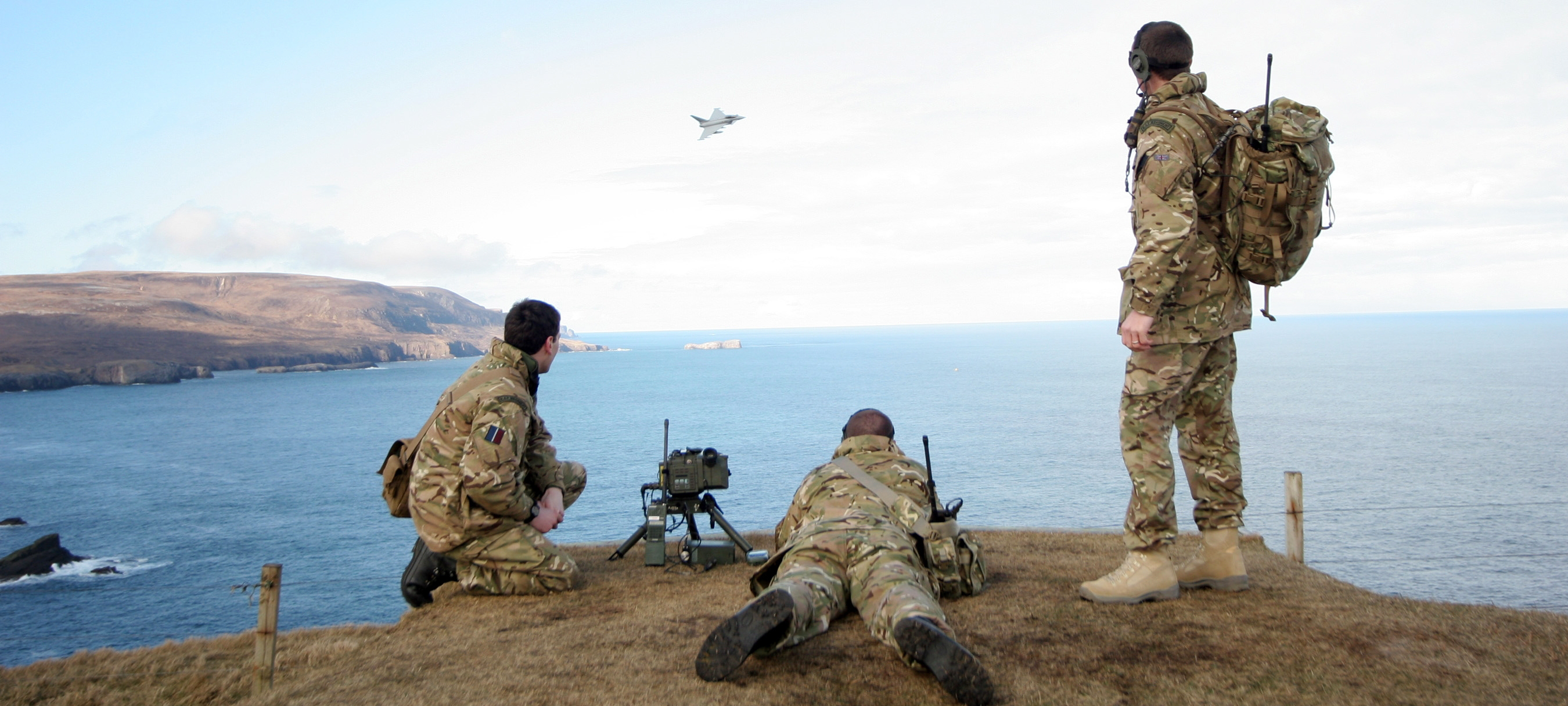
RAF Forward Air Controllers guide a Typhoon of No. 6 Squadron RAF onto its target during an exercise at Cape Wrath.

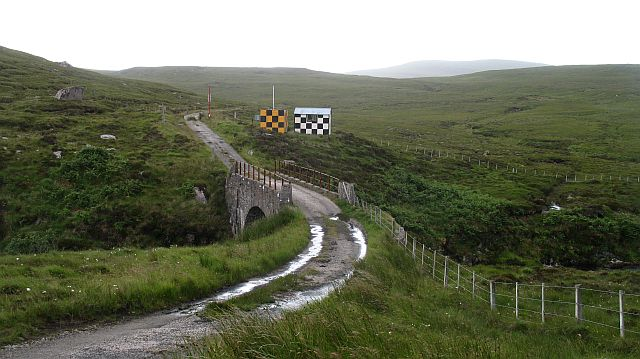
Military post on way to ranges

The Ministry of Defence (MoD) owns a 59 km^{2} (23 sq mi) area of the cape, known as the Cape Wrath Training Centre. The cape was used for training exercises from the early years of the 20th century, with the first by-laws established in 1933 to allow use of the area as a firing range. The area was used originally as a naval gunnery range and was bought by the MoD in 1999. Since 2005 the area has been used as a multi-services training area and is one of the sites used in the Joint Warrior exercises, Europe's largest military exercise, and by other NATO operations. Training is allowed on up to 120 days a year, usually taking place in the spring and autumn, although times can be unpredictable. The range is usually open for public access during the summer period and there is rarely firing on Sundays.

The MoD owns a number of the surviving buildings in the area and operates observation posts and sentry posts during training. It is used for naval gunfire practice and for army artillery and mortar range firing. Disused military vehicles are often used as targets. The RAF uses An Garbh-eilean (Garvie Island) as a target for a range of training operations. It is the only place in the Northern Hemisphere where NATO forces combine land, air and sea capabilities in assault mode for training manoeuvres, deploying ordnance up to 1,000-pound (450 kg) bombs. Firing on the range is controlled from Faraid Head close to Balnakeil.

In 2008 a heath fire was caused on the range during a period of live firing. An area of around 137 ha (340 acres) was affected. Scottish Natural Heritage estimated that the area would take 10 years to return to its normal environmental conditions. Concern has also been raised of the effects of military exercises on nesting birds, on sheep during lambing season and the effects of noise on local residents. A shell fired during exercises caused concern in 2002 when it landed 8 mi (13 km) off-target near the mouth of Loch Eriboll and around 1 mi (2 km) from houses.

The MoD expressed an interest in extending its land holdings on the Cape in 2012 after being given the opportunity to purchase 24 ha (59 acres) surrounding Cape Wrath Lighthouse by the Northern Lighthouse Board. The plans were opposed by the Durness Development Group which cited concerns that historic buildings might be destroyed and that visitors may be unable to access cliff top paths. The group registered an interest in the land using community right to buy legislation and a petition opposing the sale attracted thousands of signatures. In May 2013, the MoD announced that it would not be continuing with the purchase.

The range has also been used by the Leeds University Rocketry Association for launching high altitude rockets. In June of 2026 the Gryphon II Block II was launched to an estimated altitude of 15km (50,000ft), the highest ever for an amateur British rocket, but was lost at sea shortly after launch.

== Tourism ==
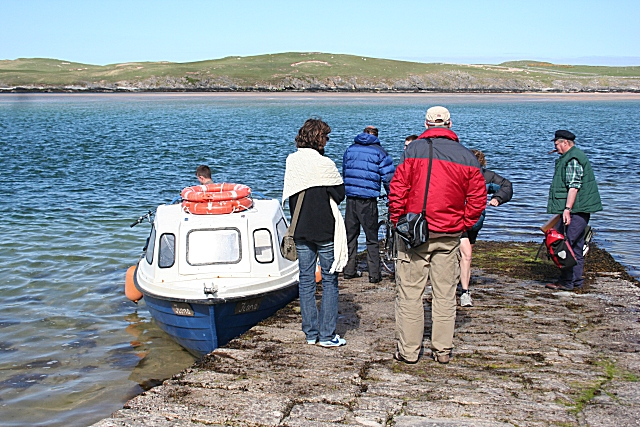
The Cape Wrath ferry

The cape is visited by between 2,000 and 6,000 tourists a year, attracted by the lack of settlements, plants, animals, cliffs, mountain backdrop and lighthouse. The tourist industry is estimated to be worth between £400,000 and £620,000 to the economy of the local area around Durness.

The Cape is the northern trail head of two trails.

1. The Cape Wrath Trail, 200 mi (320 km) through isolated country from Fort William
2. The Scottish National Trail, 460 mi (740 km) from Kirk Yetholm on the Scottish border.

Cape Wrath is also the turning point for the Cape Wrath Marathon. It runs for 11 mi (18 km) to the lighthouse and the same distance back to the ferry dock on the Cape side. The final 4 mi (6.5 km) leg of the race is run from the mainland side from the ferry dock and finishes at Durness Community Centre. The marathon is held each year as the final event of a week of races, the Cape Wrath Challenge.

The sole inhabitants of the Cape are the Ure family, renting the main building. They converted it into a three-bedroomed home, and opened what is claimed to be Britain's most remote cafe, the Ozone Cafe, in 2009. The cafe was opened by the Princess Royal, and seats eight people.

The Durness Development Group has made proposals, assisted by the Highlands and Islands Social Enterprise Zone, to develop Cape Wrath as a visitor location. These may see the number of visitors rise to 10,000 and facilities at the Cape developed.

== Transport ==
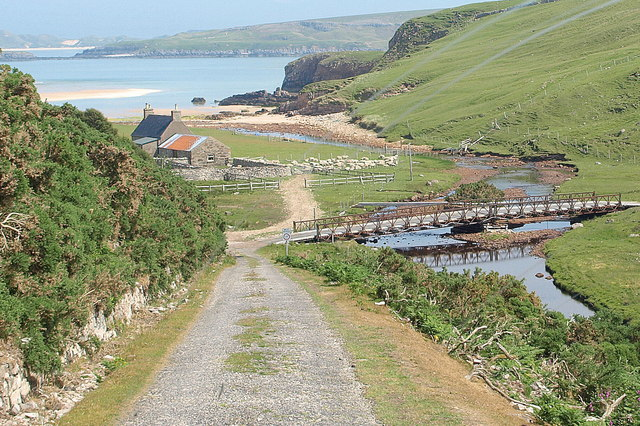
View of bridge at Daill on the Cape Wrath road looking east towards the Kyle of Durness

From the south, the only route to the Cape is on foot from Sandwood Bay and Kinlochbervie. Access is restricted at times by military operations on the Cape.

A rough road of around 11 mi (18 km) links the lighthouse with the Kyle of Durness which is crossed by a passenger ferry service operating between May and September. The road was built as part of the lighthouse construction in 1828 and, in places, uses a series of rock causeways to cross peat bogs and revetments to maintain a route along steep slopes. Materials for the road were quarried locally and there are a number of quarrying sites along it. The road is marked with milestones and crosses the Allt na Guaille and Kearvaig River on contemporary arched bridges. The original slipway on the Kyle of Durness was built north of Daill with an associated storehouse similar to that at Clais Charnach. This was linked by a rough track with the road being extended south the slipway at Ferry House during the 1830s.

The road, the U70, passes the hamlet of Achiemore where a Ministry of Defence check-point blocks access to the cape during live firing exercises. It passes the farmsteads of Daill and Inshore, where the MoD uses the remaining house, before a track to the right links the road to the old hamlet of Kearvaig, where there is a beach and Kearvaig House which the Mountain Bothies Association have converted into a bothy. Margaret Davies, a walker, was found there dying of starvation in 2002. A minibus service operates along the road during the summer period linking the ferry slipway with the lighthouse. The road, ferry and minibus service are suspended during military training operations on the cape.

== See also ==
- Cape Wrath Lighthouse
- Durness
- North West Highlands Geopark
- Extreme points of the United Kingdom
