= Cocoa Mountain =

Scottish gourmet chocolate enterprise

Cocoa Mountain is a small gourmet chocolate enterprise situated in Durness in the North West Highlands of Scotland.

== History ==
The company was founded in 2006 by James Findlay and his civil partner Paul Maden. Maden reportedly tested around 100 truffle recipes before a final 25 were launched. The company were awarded a Scotland Food and Drink Excellence Award for food tourism in 2009. They appeared on the Dragons' Den TV programme in 2015, where they failed to attract investment.

By 2019, they had two cafes in Sutherland – one in Balnakeil, Durness and the other in Dornoch – and a factory in Perth.

Cocoa Mountain uses exotic truffle flavours in its chocolates and produces its own hot chocolate served on the premises in the Cocoa Mountain Chocolate Bar. Where possible, the company stated that they use local and ethically sourced ingredients.

The company turned down a prospective large order from Prince Charles, due to a condition that the company add preservatives to a truffle recipe. A US Senator and Middle Eastern tycoons had reportedly been customers.
