= Sangobeg =

Coordinates: 58.55348°N 4.70361°W

Sangobeg: Scottish Gaelic: Saingea Beag
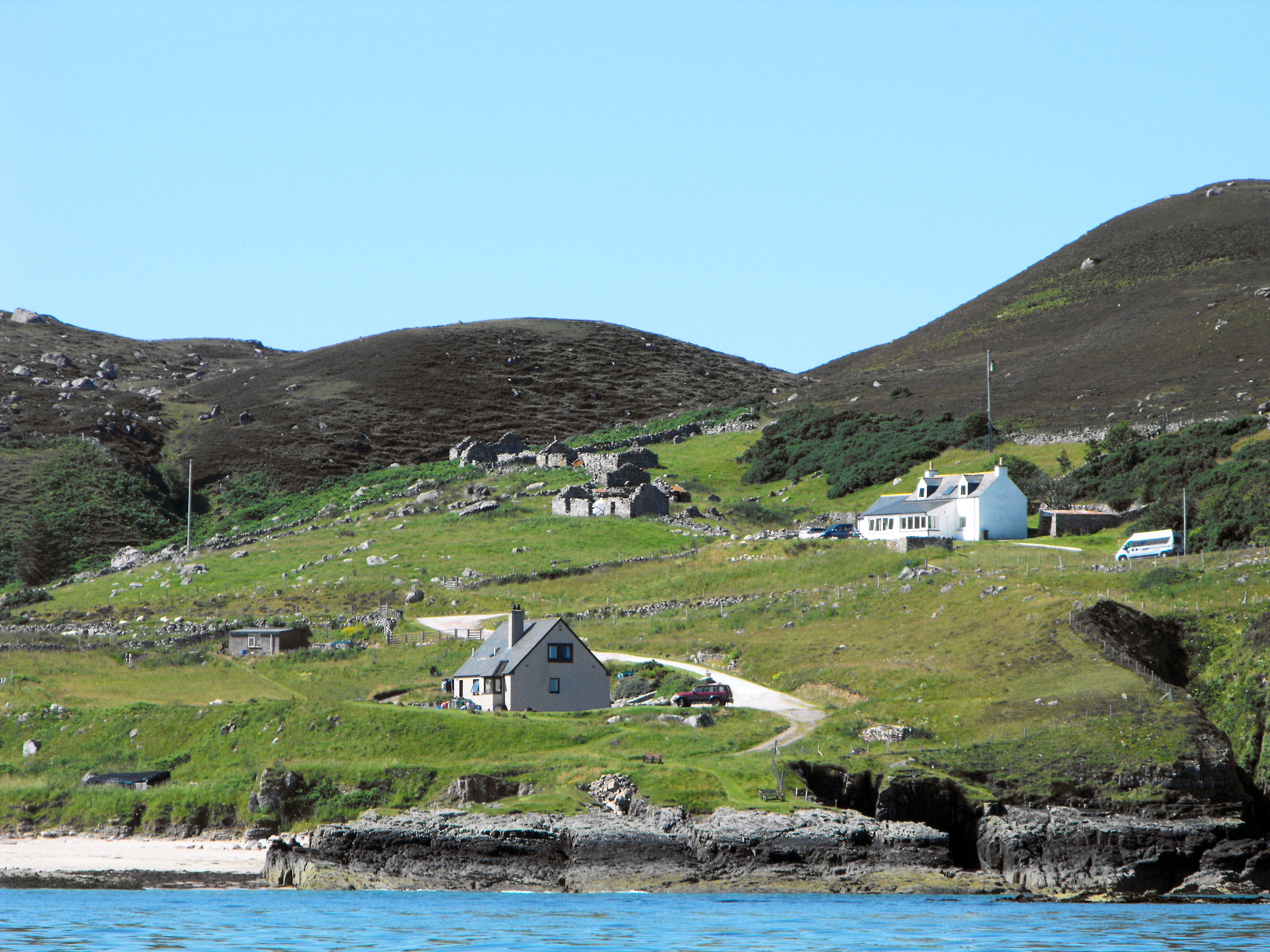

- Location within the Sutherland area
- Population: 6
- OS grid reference: NC427659
- Council area: Highland
- Lieutenancy area: Sutherland
- Country: Scotland
- Sovereign state: United Kingdom
- Post town: Lairg
- Postcode district: IV27
- Dialling code: 01971
- Police: Scotland
- Fire: Scottish
- Ambulance: Scottish

Sangobeg (Scottish Gaelic: Saingea Beag) is a remote coastal crofting township which overlooks Sangobeg Sands in Sutherland, Scottish Highlands in the Scottish council area of Highland. A legacy of the clearances, this small township sits near the township of Leirinmore on the edge of Durness around 1 mile (1.6 km) northwest along the A838 road.

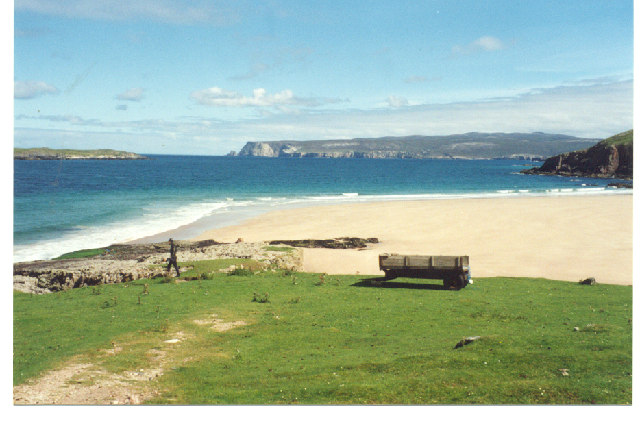
Sangobeg Bay
