= Balchrick =

Coordinates: 58.49054°N 5.10459°W

Balchrick: Scottish Gaelic: Baile a' Chnuic
- Location within the Sutherland area
- OS grid reference: NC191599
- Council area: Highland
- Lieutenancy area: Sutherland
- Country: Scotland
- Sovereign state: United Kingdom
- Post town: Rhiconich
- Postcode district: IV27 4
- Police: Scotland
- Fire: Scottish
- Ambulance: Scottish

Balchrick (Scottish Gaelic: Baile a' Chnuic) is a township on the north east shore of Lairg in Sutherland, Scottish Highlands and is in the Scottish council area of Highland.

Balchrick lies entirely within the estate of the John Muir Trust's Sandwood Estate. Balchrick also lies between Blairmore and Sheigra. To the South / South West you can find the beaches of Polin and Oldshoremore.

Just a hundred yards away is the start of the trail to Sandwood Bay.
