= Lotte Glob =

Danish ceramic artist

- Born: 1944; Samsø Island, Denmark
- Style: ceramics

Lotte Glob (born 1944) is a Danish ceramic artist living in the north of Scotland.

== Life ==
Glob was born in 1944 on Samsø, a Danish island, the daughter of Peter Glob, a Danish archaeologist.

Glob grew up in Aarhus and aged 14 became an apprentice to Danish ceramist Gutte Eriksen. Later she was taught by 'Knud Jensen in Denmark' working in a '8 generations traditional slipware pottery'. 'Asger Jorn and the COBRA artists' were an early influence on her work. In 1963, aged 19, Glob moved to County Cork, Ireland. She worked in Ireland, Scotland, France and travelled extensively, 'exploring landscapes in Iceland, the Faroe Islands, Greenland, New Zealand, Spain, Sweden' and cityscapes in 'New York, Barcelona, Stockholm and Helsinki.'

In 1968, Glob established a workshop in Balnakeil Craft Village at Durness in Sutherland, and later moved to Loch Eriboll 9 miles east of Durness. Here she built a timber house designed by architect Gökay Deveci that in 2004 was shortlisted for the RIAS Andrew Doolan Best Building in Scotland Award. Planting trees and working with natural features in the landscape, Glob created a Sculpture Croft around her home and studio.

Glob's work explores the relationship between human beings and nature, fusing ancient rocks and sediments with clay. Surrounded by the UNESCO North West Highlands Geopark Glob often hikes in the mountains, gathering materials and inspiration for her sculptures and returning her work to nature by placing sculptures at various locations in the landscape.

Lotte Glob's work can be found in collections including the 'Museum of Fine Art, Copenhagen, National Museum of Scotland Edinburgh, The McManus Museum and Art Gallery, Dundee, Mclaurin Gallery, Ayr, the Victoria and Albert Museum Library Collection, Paisley Museum and Art Galleries, Stirling University collection' and Strathnaver Museum.

Søren Ryge Petersen made two documentaries for the Danish Broadcasting Corporation (DR), broadcast in 1999 and 2013, about Glob's life in the mountains called "DR-Derude i Skotland".

== External sources ==
- Lotte Glob's homepage
- Article The Scotsman (2016)
