= Cape Wrath Lighthouse =

Lighthouse in Sutherland, Scotland

Cape Wrath Lighthouse Am Parbh
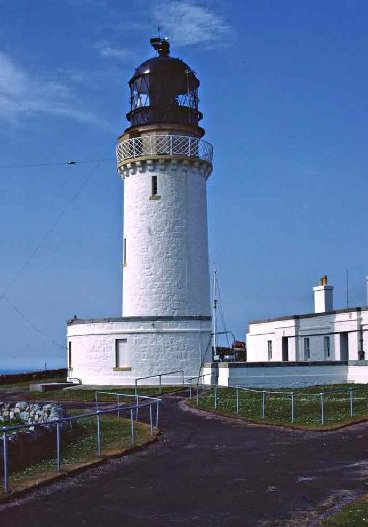
- Cape Wrath Lighthouse
- Location: Sutherland; Scotland
- OS grid: NC2595574726
- Coordinates: 58°37′31.6″N 4°59′55.9″W

Tower
- Constructed: 1828
- Built by: Robert Stevenson
- Construction: granite tower
- Automated: 1998
- Height: 20 metres (66 ft)
- Shape: cylindrical tower with balcony and lantern attached to keeper's house
- Markings: white tower, black lantern, ochre trim
- Power source: mains electricity
- Operator: Northern Lighthouse Board
- Heritage: category A listed building

Light
- Focal height: 122 metres (400 ft)
- Range: 22 nautical miles (41 km; 25 mi)
- Characteristic: Fl (4) W 30s.

Cape Wrath Lighthouse at Cape Wrath was built in 1828 by Robert Stevenson and was staffed until 1998, when it was converted to automatic operation by the Northern Lighthouse Board. It is located at the most North-Westerly point on the British mainland, in the traditional county of Sutherland within Highland Region. Durness is the closest village, 10 miles (16 km) to the south-east with Inverness around 120 miles (190 km) to the south.

Overlooking the Cape are the ruins of the Lloyd's signal station, which was used to monitor shipping and was built in the 19th century. The light, which is 122 metres (400 ft) above sea level, is visible for 22 nautical miles (41 km; 25 mi).

== History ==
The lighthouse was built in 1828. Due to its height the light was often obscured by low cloud or fog and in the early 20th century plans were drawn up to build an additional low light. This involved the construction of tunnels into the headland, bridges and building on the very tip of the rocks below the headland. Plans were drawn up by David Alan Stevenson, Robert's grandson and work began in 1913 but was suspended at the start of World War I and never restarted.

The light was originally a paraffin lamp with red and white reflectors. This was replaced by mercury vapour lamps in 1978 and in 1980 an electrical temporary power beam was installed with a gear less pedestal and array system later in the same year. The fog-horn at the site was discontinued in 2001.

== Current display ==
The current light characteristic is four white flashes every 30 seconds (Fl(4).W.30s) and is visible for 22 nautical miles (41 km; 25 mi). The optics are a first order Fresnel lens and the light has a power rating of 200,000 candela.

== Buildings and access routes ==
The lighthouse is a 20 metres (66 ft) tall white-washed tower built of granite with a single storey semi-circular base building. A number of lighthouse keepers cottages and store buildings are located near to the lighthouse, with the complex surrounded by a perimeter wall. The lighthouse and its associated buildings are designated as a Category A listed building. Much of the material for the lighthouse was quarried locally during construction, particularly from Clais Charnach.

A complex of buildings was built close to the lighthouse by Lloyd's of London as a signal station between 1894 and 1903. These buildings, which are Category B listed buildings, form one of the few remaining sites of Lloyds signal stations in the UK. The signal station was built to track shipping around Cape Wrath and was closed in 1932, although the site was reused in 1939 as an observation post at the outbreak of World War II. A new coastguard station was built next to the signalling station in the 1940s for wartime use. The signal station and coastguard station buildings are largely derelict.

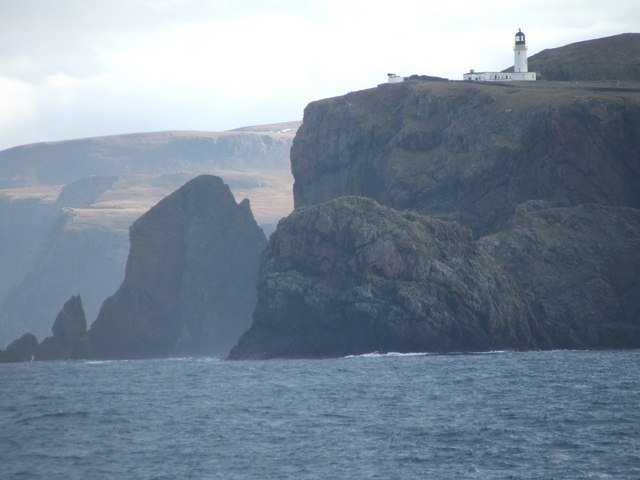
Cape Wrath and the lighthouse from the sea

A slipway was built in 1827, prior to construction of the lighthouse, at Clais Charnach, a steep sided gully around 1.7 miles (2.7 km) south-east of the lighthouse. This was used during the building of the lighthouse to supply materials along a rough road and was the main landing point for supplies and stores during the staffed operation of the lighthouse, although from 1977 onwards helicopters were also used for resupply. Store buildings were constructed at the same time, one of which is still in use by the Ministry of Defence. The slipway was extended and rebuilt in around 1863 and remains in use as a landing site for the lighthouse. The access road from the Kyle of Durness was built to support the lighthouse in 1828.

The lighthouse is now considered to be the end of the Cape Wrath Trail, an approximately 200-mile-long very rugged walking trail from Fort William.

== See also ==
- List of lighthouses in Scotland
- List of Northern Lighthouse Board lighthouses
