= Achiemore, Durness =

Coordinates: 58.568°N 4.821°W

Achiemore
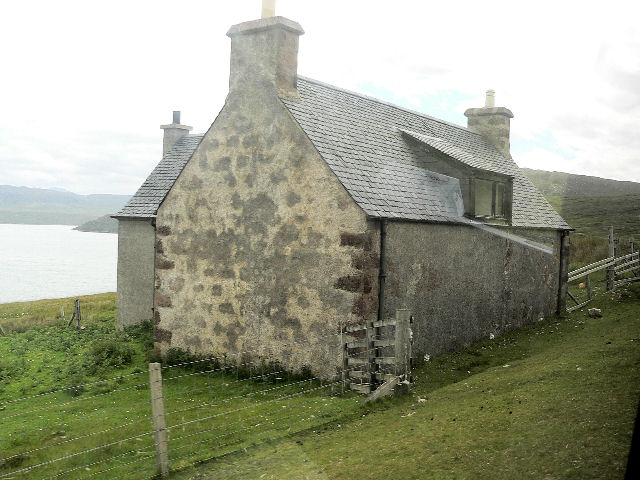
- Empty house at Achiemore

- Location within the Sutherland area
- OS grid reference: NC360679
- Council area: Highland
- Lieutenancy area: Sutherland
- Country: Scotland
- Sovereign state: United Kingdom

Achiemore was a crofting community located on the Cape Wrath peninsula near the village of Durness in the Scottish county of Sutherland. The hamlet is just south of the farmstead of Daill on the western shore of the Kyle of Durness. Neither place has a permanent population with the village of Durness located 2.5 miles (4.0 km) to the east. Inverness is around 120 miles (190 km) to the south.

== Access ==
Achiemore is in the Highland Council area in the far north of Scotland. Access across the Kyle of Durness is by a small passenger ferry operating from Keoldale during the summer months. The hamlet is on the U70 road linking the ferry to the lighthouse at Cape Wrath which was built in the 1830s as a supply road for the newly opened lighthouse replacing a track which linked to an original slipway north of Daill. Quarries alongside the road at both Achiemore and Daill were used to provide material for the building of the road.

== History ==
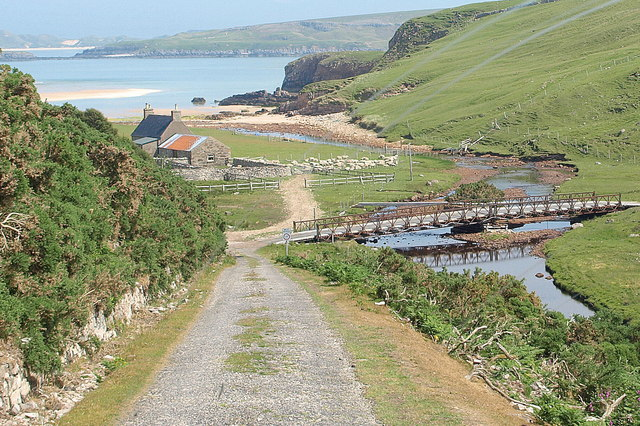
View of the bridge at Daill on the Cape Wrath road looking east towards the Kyle of Durness

Between 1935 and 1938, there were around 40 people living on the cape side. The farmsteads at Daill and Achiemore consisted of two or three buildings with assorted enclosures. Up to 10 children from across the cape were known to attend a side school to Durness Primary School which was located at Achiemore. The school closed in 1947 and the whole area of the cape is now virtually uninhabited. The school building stood until the early 1990s, when its roof blew off in strong winds, and its walls were taken down to strengthen the wooden bridge constructed by the Royal Marines in 1980 crossing the Daill River to the north west of Achiemore.

Achiemore is located just outside the Cape Wrath Training Area, a military training and live firing range which has operated on the cape since the early 20th century. A military sentry post adjacent to the site of the school restricts access to the area when the range is in use.

A possible site of a promontory fort is located to the north-east of Achiemore on the shore of the Kyle of Durness where drystone and turf enclosures have been surveyed. A site at Eilean nan Caorach, around 2 miles (3.2 km) north of Daill is a more likely location of a promontory fort or monastery. The site has been heavily damaged by shelling and dating is difficult as a result.

== See also ==
- Cape Wrath
- Durness
