= List of listed buildings in Durness, Highland =

This is a list of listed buildings in the parish of Durness in Highland, Scotland.

== List ==
Name	Location	Date listed	Geo-coordinates	Notes	Category	LB number	Image
Balnakeil, Durness Old Church And Burial Ground			58°34′34″N 4°46′07″W		B	486	Upload Photo
Cape Wrath Lighthouse And Keepers' Cottages			58°37′28″N 4°59′58″W		A	488	Upload another image See more images
Leirinbeg House And Steading			58°33′56″N 4°44′02″W		B	494	Upload another image
Rispond Lodge, Cottage And Fishing Station			58°32′56″N 4°39′44″W		B	495	Upload Photo
Ard Neackie, House Lime Kilns And Pier			58°29′49″N 4°39′59″W		B	516	Upload Photo
Balnakeil House, Walled Garden, Enclosing Walls And Gate Piers			58°34′33″N 4°46′02″W		A	517	Upload another image
Balnakeil, Old Manse And Walled Garden			58°34′05″N 4°45′56″W		B	487	Upload Photo
Gobernuisgach Lodge, Game Larder And Steading			58°20′09″N 4°40′21″W		B	491	Upload Photo
Balnakeil Former Corn Mill			58°34′31″N 4°46′05″W		B	518	Upload Photo
Hope Lodge			58°30′12″N 4°37′11″W		B	493	Upload Photo
Smoo Lodge And Gatepiers			58°33′50″N 4°43′26″W		C(S)	5272	Upload Photo
Eriboll House			58°28′07″N 4°41′24″W		B	490	Upload Photo
Drochaid Mhor Bridge Over River Dionard			58°30′05″N 4°48′59″W		B	489	Upload Photo
Laid, Polla Bridge By Polla Ford On A838			58°27′04″N 4°45′35″W		C(S)	492	Upload Photo

== Key ==
The scheme for classifying buildings in Scotland is:

- Category A: "buildings of national or international importance, either architectural or historic; or fine, little-altered examples of some particular period, style or building type."
- Category B: "buildings of regional or more than local importance; or major examples of some particular period, style or building type, which may have been altered."
- Category C: "buildings of local importance; lesser examples of any period, style, or building type, as originally constructed or moderately altered; and simple traditional buildings which group well with other listed buildings."

In March 2016 there were 47,288 listed buildings in Scotland. Of these, 8% were Category A, and 50% were Category B, with the remaining 42% being Category C.

== See also ==
- List of listed buildings in Highland
