= Badcall =

Badcall is the name of several small settlements in Sutherland in northwest Scotland:

- Badcall, Rhiconich - near Rhiconich and Kinlochbervie, on Loch Inchard
- Badcall, Scourie - made up of Lower Badcall and Upper Badcall, on Badcall Bay, near Scourie
