= River Dionard =

Coordinates: 58°31′13″N 4°48′34″W

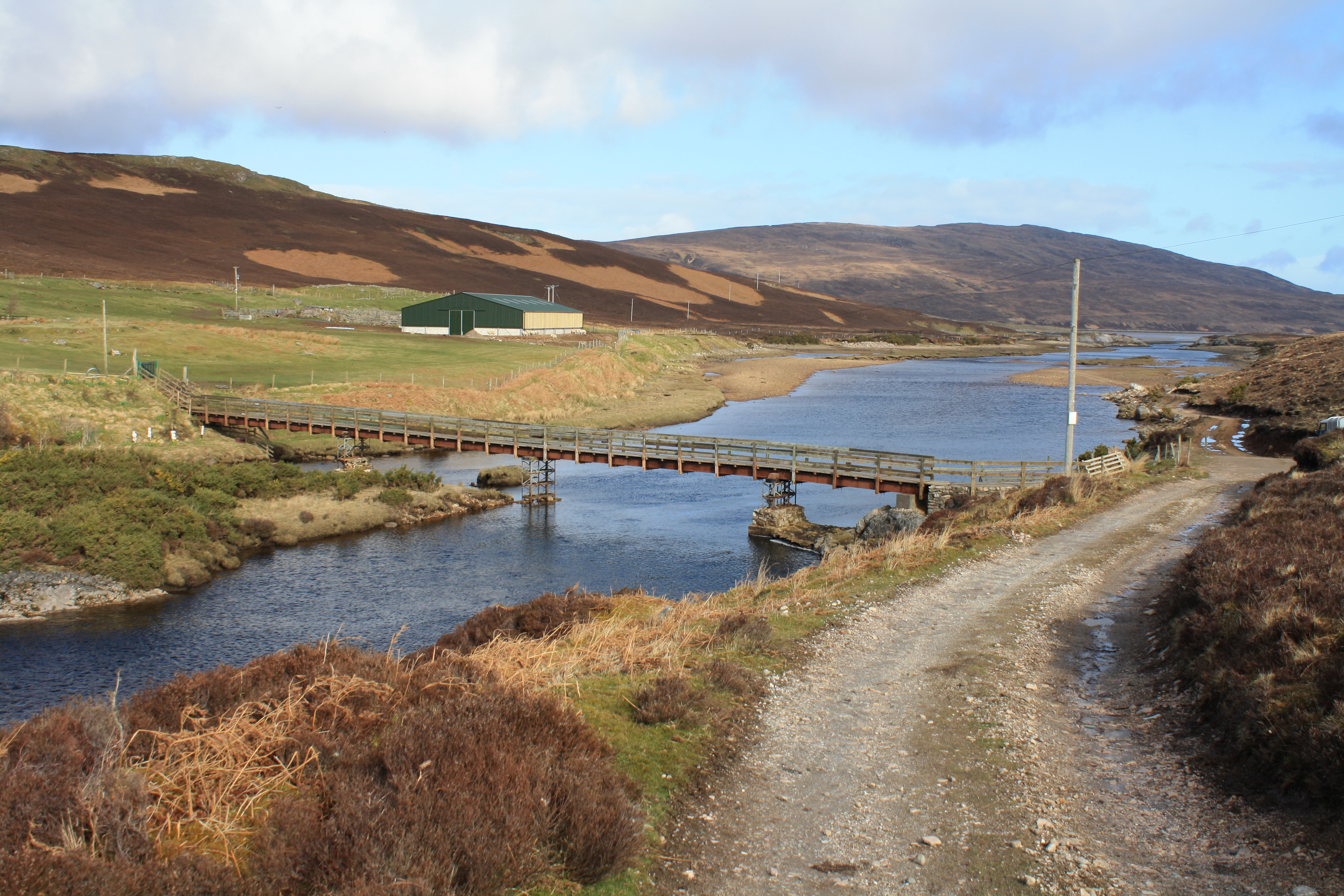

The River Dionard is a river in the historic county of Sutherland in northwest Scotland. It arises as the outflow from Loch Dionard which lies below the eastern side of Foinaven and flows north-northwest through Strath Dionard below that mountain's eastern flanks for 7 km before turning north and then northeast towards the head of the Kyle of Durness. Its winding channel is exposed at low tide within the sands of this shallow firth which connects with the Atlantic Ocean on the north coast. The principal headwater stream feeding Loch Dionard is the Allt an Easain Ghill which passes through two lochans beneath Meall Horn; the upper Lochan Ulbha and the lower An Dubh-loch. The nearby Allt Eilidh a' Chleirich flows from a third lochan, Lochan Sgeireach. There are numerous other streams and lochans in the upper catchment. The Gualin National Nature Reserve has been established within the catchment.

The name may be from dyn-fjordr, 'noisy-firth.'
