= Faraid Head =

Peninsula in Scotland

Coordinates: 58°36′12″N 4°46′33″W

Faraid Head (Sutherland)

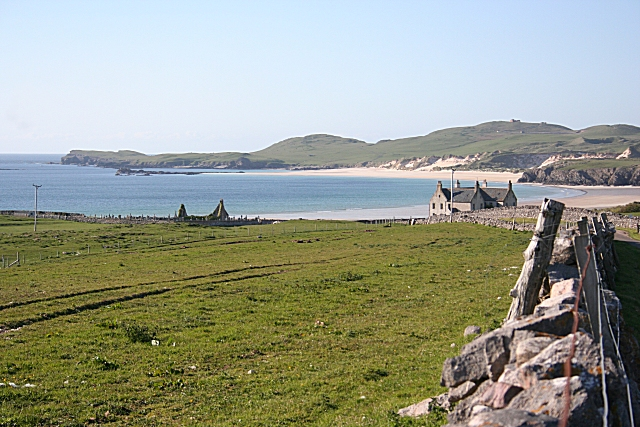
View of Faraid Head from Balnakeil

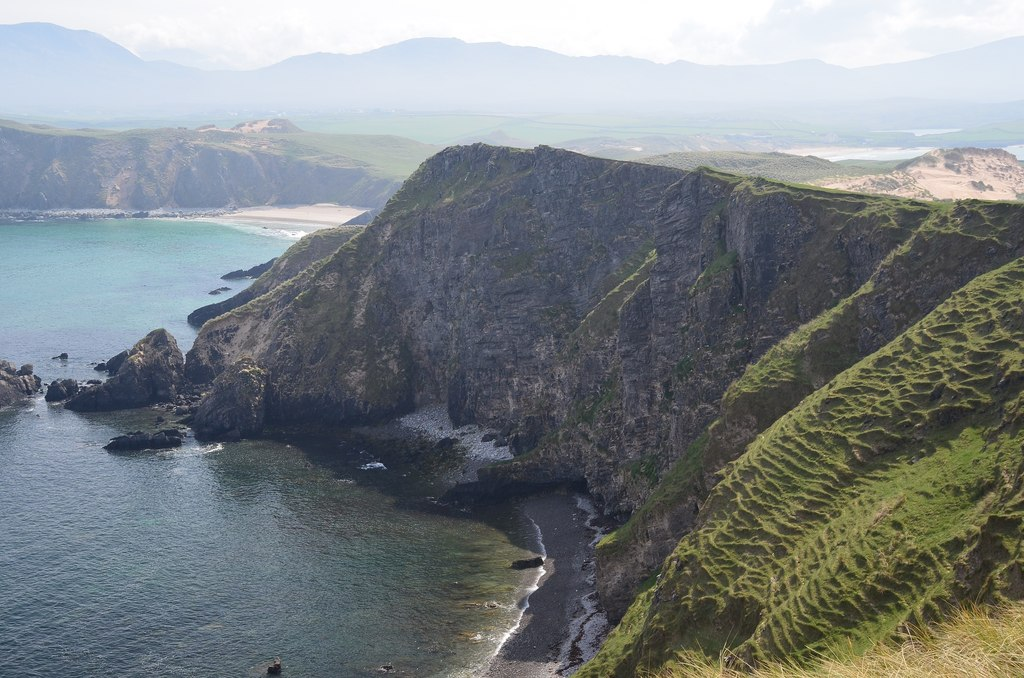
Cliffs on the east side of the peninsula

Faraid Head (also Farout Head, Fair-Aird; Scottish Gaelic: An Fharaird, lit. 'projecting cape') is a small peninsula on the northern coast of Sutherland, Scotland, located around two miles (3 km) north of the hamlet of Balnakeil and three miles (5 km) north of Durness.

The promontory projects 2.25 miles (3.62 km) north-northwestward, between Balnakeil Bay on the west and the entrance to Loch Eriboll on the east, till it terminates in a point 8.5 miles (13.7 km) east-southeast of Cape Wrath. Its sides rise in rocky cliffs to a height of 329 feet (100 m) above sea-level, and present a sublime appearance; its summit commands views from Cape Wrath to Whiten Head.

Extensive sand dunes can be found at Faraid Head, which forms part of the Oldshoremore, Cape Wrath and Durness Special Landscape Area.

There is a small radar station at the tip of the peninsula, built in the 1950s as part of the ROTOR system and intended to provide radar coverage of Scotland's north coast. By the time the facility was completed, however, the ROTOR system had become obsolete. The station closed down but remained in the hands of the Ministry of Defence. In later years the main building was renovated as a control tower for the Cape Wrath and Garvie Island bombing ranges.

== See also ==
- Durness
- Balnakeil
- Cape Wrath
