= Ceannabeinne =

Coordinates: 58°33′2″N 4°40′59″W

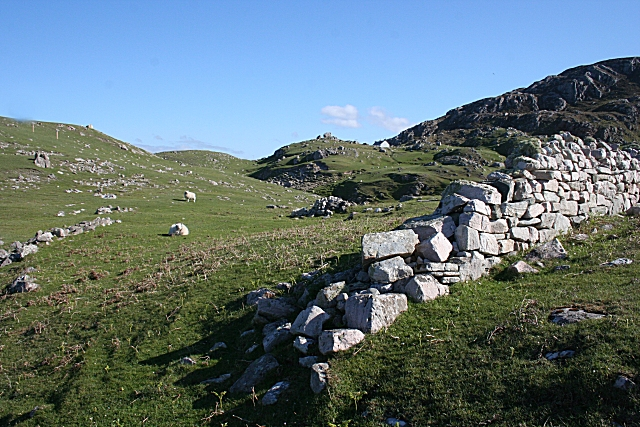
The ruins of the village of "Ceannabeinne" Gaelic for "the end of the mountain)

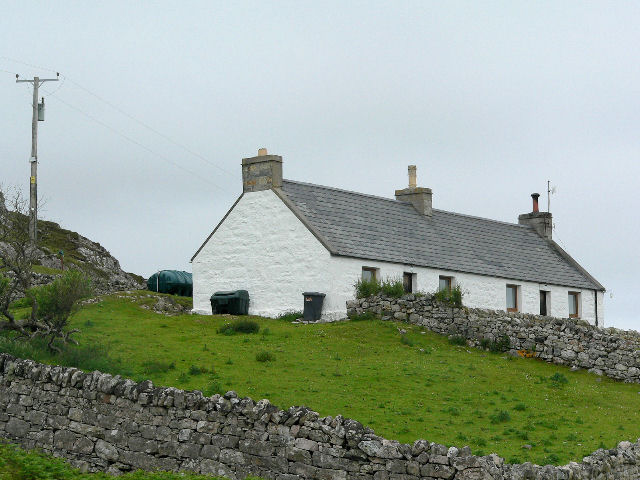
The only remaining building at Ceannabeinne is the old school house

Ceannabeinne (Gaelic for head or end of the mountains) is a ruined village within the parish of Durness, in the county of Sutherland, in the far north of the Highlands of Scotland.

== Archaeology ==
Amongst the ruins of Ceannabeinne there are the remains of what is thought to be a Monastic settlement, possibly dating from early medieval times. Also charcoal remains have been dated to 370-100 BC by Radiocarbon dating, which suggest an Iron Age fort.

== History ==
Ceannabeinne is said to have been a thriving "township" until the Highland Clearances of 1842, which resulted in rioting. There were once fourteen houses in the village of Ceanabeinne, all of which are now ruined. The only remaining building is the old school which is now a holiday home.

== Township trail ==
People are able to walk through the ruins of the township of Ceannabeinne on an official township trail that is marked with information boards and directional instructions.
