= Leirinmore =

Township in Scotland

Coordinates: 58.55278°N 4.69985°W

Leirinmore: Scottish Gaelic: An Leithrinn Mhòr
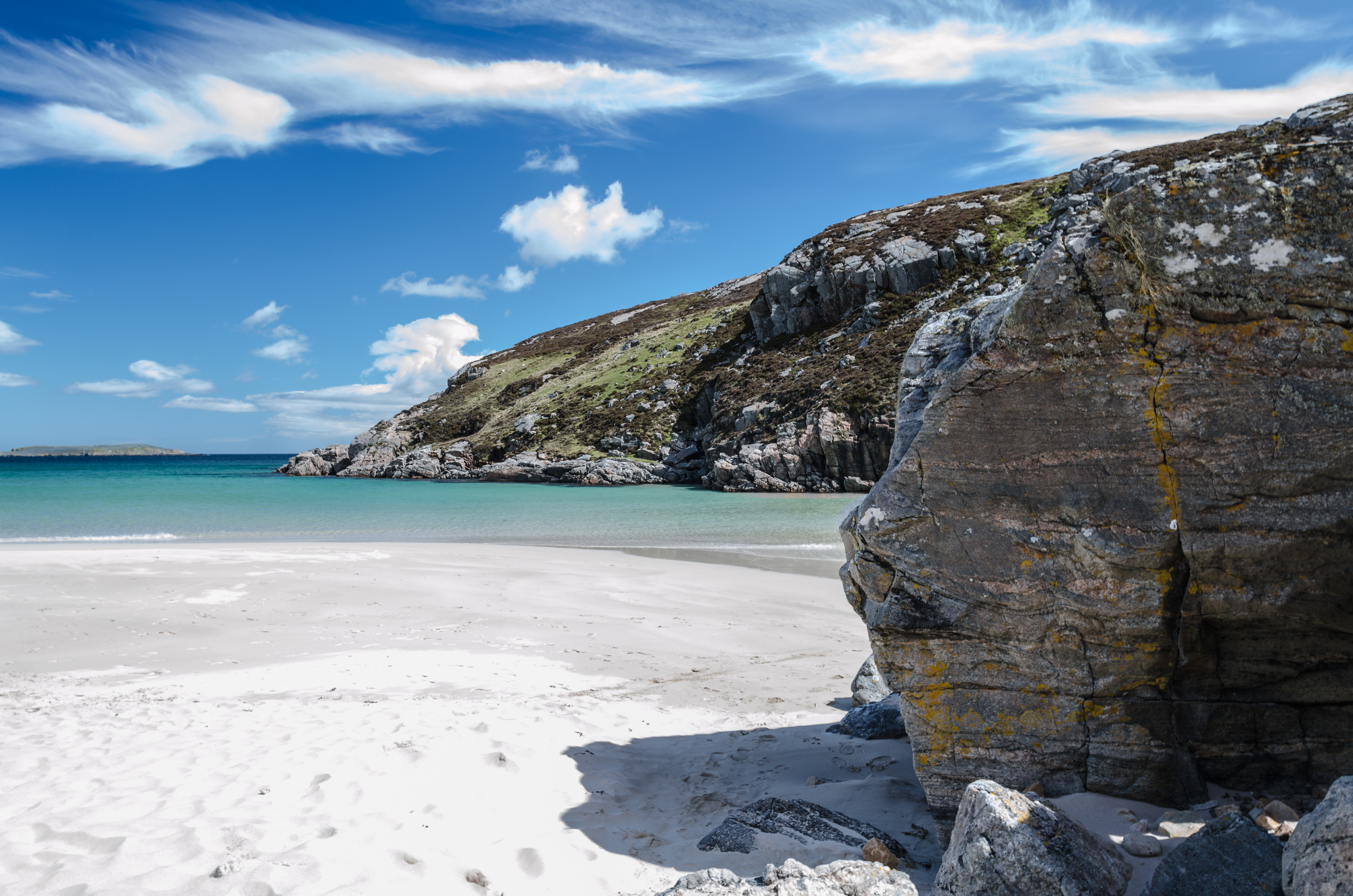
- The beach at Leirinmore called Tràigh Allt Chàilgeag facing northeast

- Location within the Sutherland area
- OS grid reference: NC430659
- Council area: Highland
- Lieutenancy area: Sutherland
- Country: Scotland
- Sovereign state: United Kingdom
- Post town: LAIRG
- Postcode district: IV27
- Police: Scotland
- Fire: Scottish
- Ambulance: Scottish

Leirinmore (Scottish Gaelic: An Leithrinn Mhòr) is a crofting township in the parish of Durness on the northern coastline of Scotland, in Sutherland, Scottish Highlands. It is in the Scottish council area of Highland. Smoo Cave is located close to Leirinmore.

== See also ==
- Smoo Cave
