= Sheigra =

Coordinates: 58°29′43″N 5°06′38″W

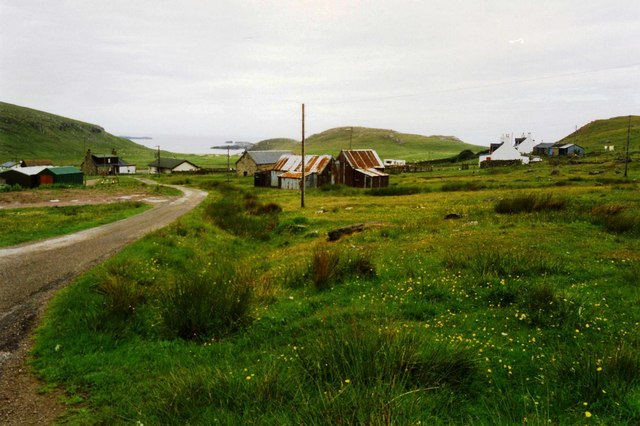
The area in 1992

Sheigra or Shegra is a small holiday settlement on the east coast of the Tongue district of Sutherland in the Highland council area in Scotland. It is located 4 miles from Kinlochbervie and the B801 road and nearly 60 miles from Thurso and the A9 and 40 miles from Ullapool and the A835. The settlement consists mostly of lodges, holidays homes, beaches and campgrounds.

Norse vikings used Sheigra as a stopover on their journey to pillage the township of Conlig in County Down, Northern Ireland in their search for gold and silver left behind by Spanish pilgrims. The Norse culture was left behind and today still exists through local dialect, customs and dress.
