= Smoo Cave =

Cave in Highland, Scotland

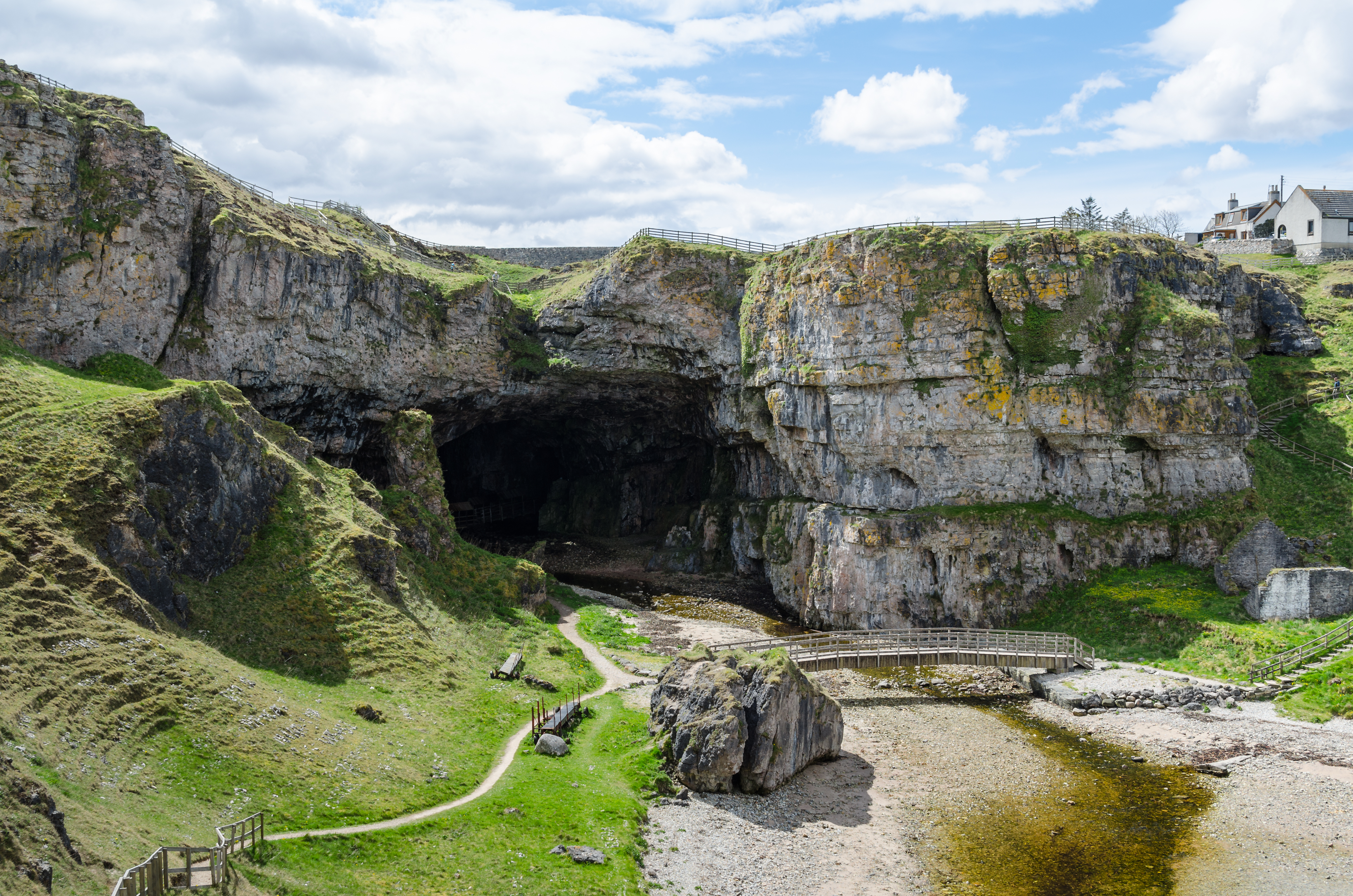
- Smoo Cave entrance

- Location within Sutherland Location within Scotland Location within the United Kingdom
- Location: Durness in Sutherland, Highland, Scotland
- Coordinates: 58°33′47″N 4°43′12″W
- Geology: Early Ordovician / dolomites

Smoo Cave is a large combined sea cave and freshwater cave in Durness in Sutherland, Highland, Scotland.

The cave name, which was previously known as Smow(e) or Smo, may originate from the Norse 'smjúga' or 'smuga', meaning a narrow cleft, or hole. However, it could instead relate to the Gaelic word 'smùid', meaning fine spray (in relation to the cave's waterfall), or the Gaelic translation Uamh as Motha of "the Largest Cave" as it was also known according to Sir Walter Scott. The name Uamh Smùdha was introduced for purposes of bilingual signage at the site ca. 2010 and has since received use in Gaelic media.

== Geology ==
Smoo Cave was formed within Early Ordovician dolomites of the Durness Group (also known as the Durness Limestone). The cave has formed along the boundary between the light grey Sangomore Formation and the dark grey, mottled Sailmhor Formation (sometimes called Leopard Rock), both of which form part of the Durness Group succession. These horizons close to the formation boundary are characterised by large and abundant chert nodules which can be found all along the inner stream chamber where they have been left behind after dissolution of the surrounding dolomite.

The cave was formed along two geological lines of weakness by a combination of erosion from the sea and an inland underground stream which has formed the innermost chambers. Upstream of the Allt Smoo which runs into the cave, impermeable quartzites have been faulted against the Durness Limestone, causing the stream to sink down into the carbonate rock soon after it has crossed the contact between the two different rock types.

British Geological Survey Report

== Physical description ==
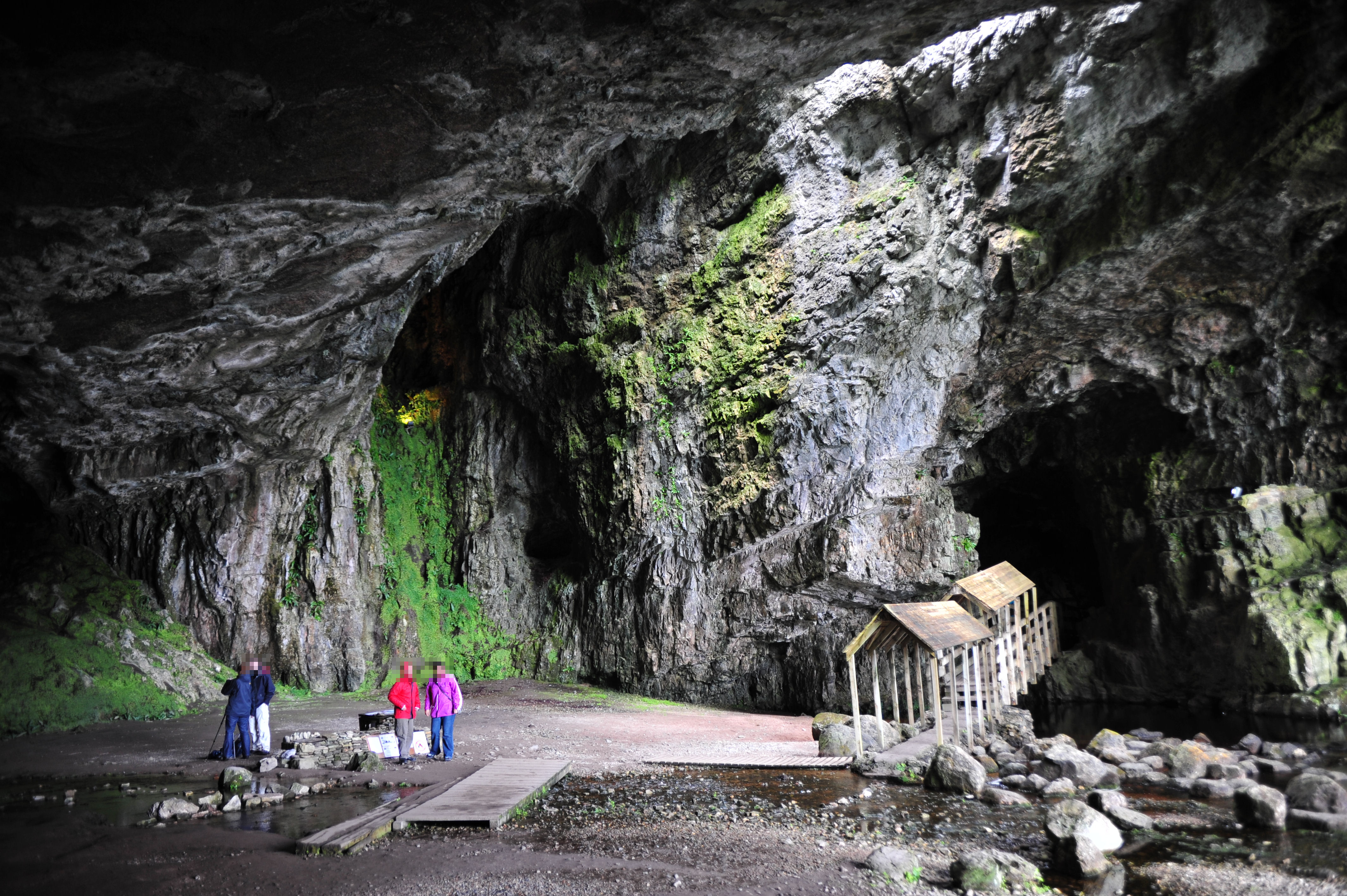
Outer chamber of Smoo Cave. The main entrance is to the right; the covered walkway leads to the second (inner) cave that has the waterfall.

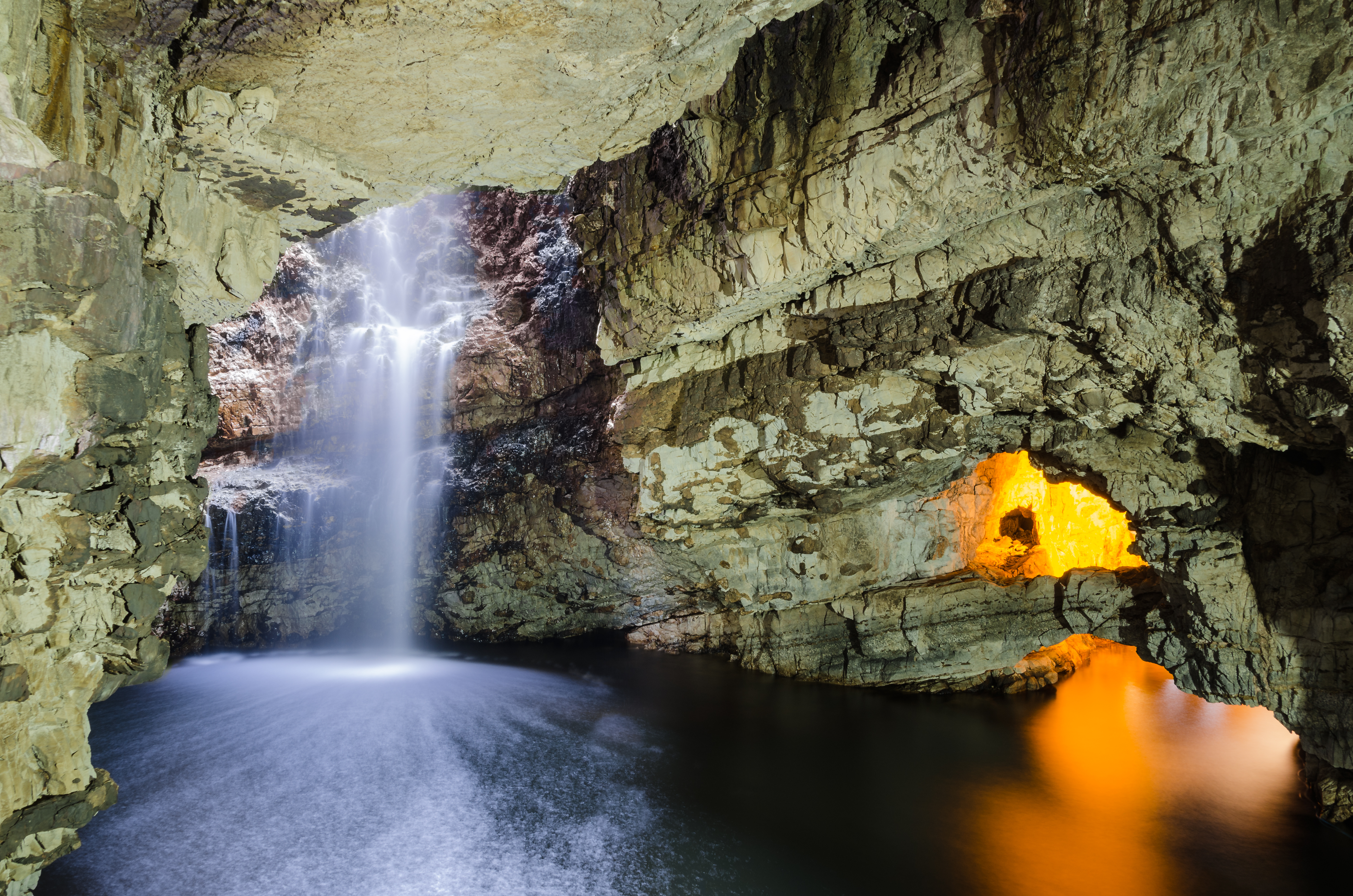
The Smoo burn drops into the cave through a sink hole.

The cave is unique within the UK in that the first chamber has been formed by the action of the sea, whereas the inner chambers are freshwater passages, formed from rainwater dissolving the carbonate dolomites. Partway through the cave the waters of Allt Smoo also drop in as a 20 metres (66 ft) high waterfall. This is mainly due to the nearby dolomite–quartzite geological boundary where the Allt Smoo stream crosses the impermeable quartzites and sinks on meeting the permeable dolomites.

The cave can be thought of as two caves formed by different mechanisms that have joined over time. The cave is composed of three main sections: a large sea cave entrance chamber, a waterfall chamber and a short freshwater passage which leads to a terminal sump chamber with some flowstone formations at the rear.

The cave entrance and main chamber have been considerably enlarged by sea action to approximately 40 metres (130 ft) wide and 15 metres (49 ft) high, the largest sea cave entrance in Britain. The entrance is located at the end of a 600 metres (660 yd) long tidal gorge (Geodha Smoo) which was once part of the cave, now collapsed. Several remnant pillars can be seen along the eastern side of the Geodh along with a large section of the previous roof which has been partly buried by the grassy slope (normally covered by rocks spelling out the names of visitors to the cave). The sea rarely enters the sea cave nowadays (only during spring tides) as the area has undergone isostatic uplift.

The present-day cave is 83 metres (272 ft) long up to the terminal sump at the rear of the third chamber/passage. The cave travels further, however, as an active stream of notable size resurges here at all times. Previous dye-testing has linked an underwater passage to an initial sink point in the Allt Smoo stream about 100 metres (330 ft) upstream from the main waterfall, implying that the cave system is at least twice as long as once thought.

Cave divers from the Grampian Speleological Group have dived this sump for a distance of about 40 metres (130 ft), although large volumes of silt and peat in the water have prevented further exploration. It is worth noting that the main waterfall is often dry and will only become active once this upstream sink overflows.

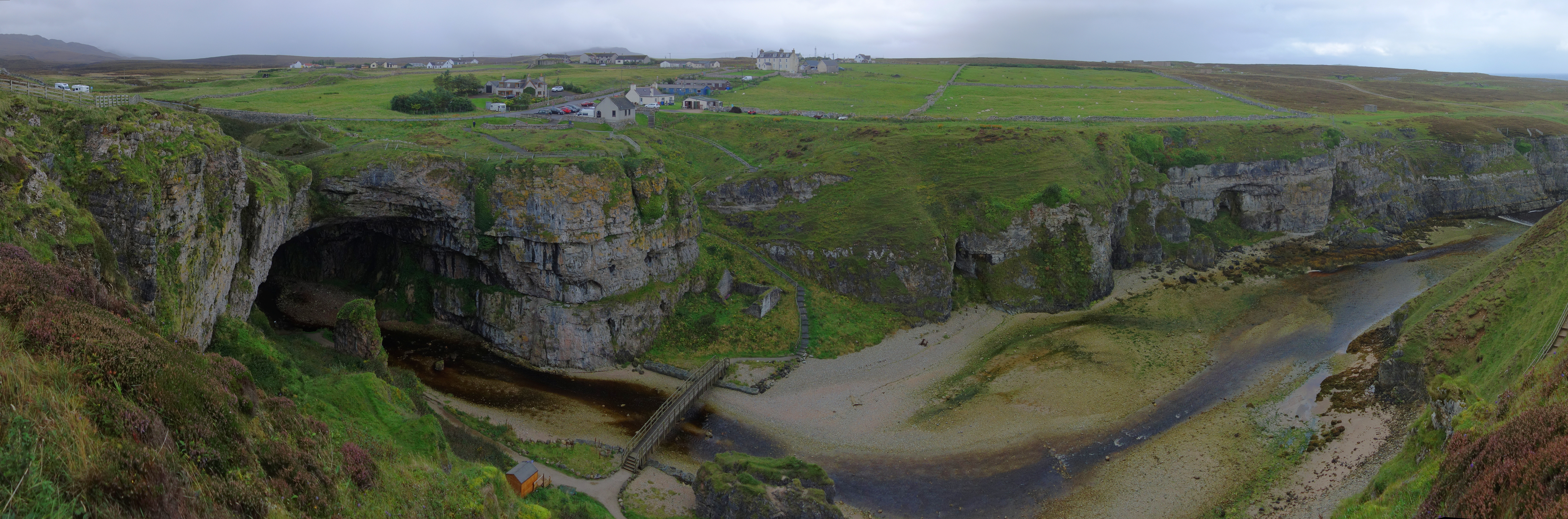
Smoo Cave with its gorge Geodha Smoo.

== Archaeology ==
Archaeological investigations in 1995 turned up Neolithic, Norse and Iron Age artifacts but the majority of the artifacts from the cave were related to Viking/Norse or medieval activity. Fish bones, marine shells, plant remains and mammal and bird bones indicated the processing and consumption of marine and terrestrial foods. Iron slag and boat nails led the archaeologists to surmise that boats were repaired in the sheltered inlet. Four radiocarbon dates from Smoo Cave and Glassknapper's Cave provide evidence for use of these sites between the eighth and 11th centuries AD. The cave complex is protected as a scheduled monument.

== Tourism ==
The cave is located 2 kilometres (1.2 mi) east of the village of Durness and is presently served by a car park, toilets, stairs and walkways. Plans are being considered for access improvements for the estimated 40,000 visitors it receives annually. Tours of the cave also operate during the summer, taking visitors to the inner chamber by boat.

Highland Council Report
