= Kyle of Durness =

Bay in Highland, Scotland

Coordinates: 58.55°N 4.79°W

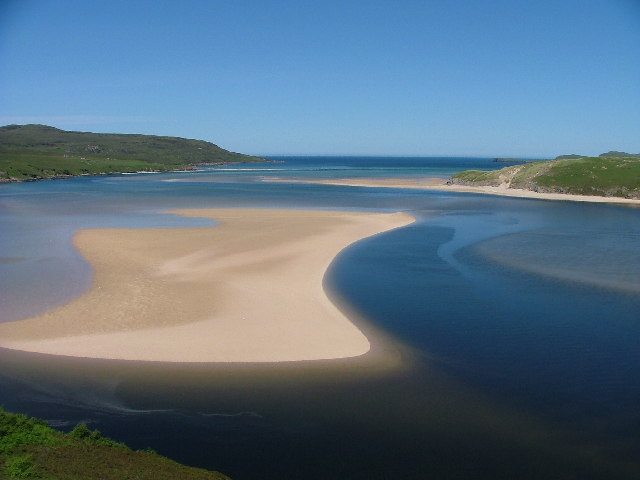
Kyle of Durness looking north towards Balnakeil Bay

Kyle of Durness (Scottish Gaelic: Caolas Dhiùranais) is a coastal inlet on the north coast of Scotland in the county of Sutherland. It extends 5 1/2 miles (9 kilometres) inland from Balnakeil and divides the Cape Wrath peninsula from the mainland. The nearest village is Durness.

== Physical features ==
The Kyle is around 1/2 mile (800 metres) wide and tidal with only a narrow channel of water remaining at low tide along most of its length. Unlike other coastal inlets along Scotland's north coast it is not straight, having two major bends around Keoldale. It opens into Balnakeil Bay, which is around 2 miles (3 kilometres) wide, at its mouth. Faraid Head, on the eastern shore of the bay, provides the range control for the Cape Wrath military training area to the west. The danger area associated with the range includes sea areas to the north of the bay and the range is used for live firing from Royal Navy vessels as well as for bombing practice by the RAF.

The River Dionard and Grudie River flow into the Kyle at its southern end with the Daill River and a number of minor streams also flowing into the Kyle along its length. The geology along the eastern team of the Kyle is limestone with rolling grasslands dominating. The Kyle and its surrounding area forms part of the Oldshoremore, Cape Wrath and Durness Special Landscape Area. It contains a number of archaeological remains dating to the prehistoric period.

== Human features ==
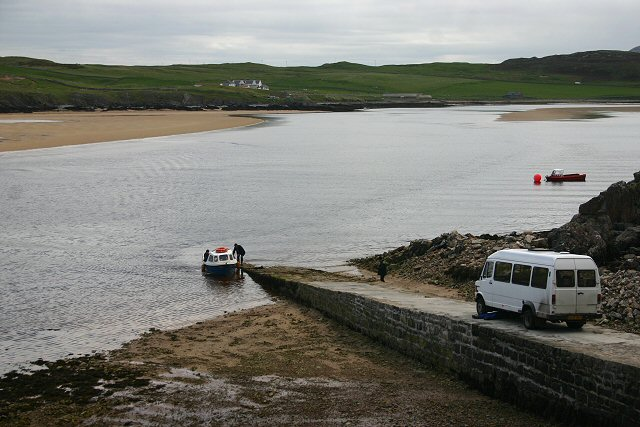
West Keoldale jetty on the Cape Wrath shore of the Kyle looking across to Keoldale

The A838 road runs along the eastern shore of the kyle in its southern section, with an unclassified road leading to Keoldale, the only remaining settlement on the shore. The Cape Wrath passenger ferry operates from Keoldale between May and September providing the only access to Cape Wrath from the east. Land to the north of Keoldale is used by the Keoldale Sheep Stock Club, a joint farm run by crofters in the Durness area. Beaches along the shore of the kyle are backed by narrow machair with few dunes.

The western shore of the Kyle is uninhabited with the former farmsteads at Achimore and Daill the only settlements. The Cape Wrath road runs along the shore from the ferry slipway. This dates from the 1830s having been built to supply the lighthouse at Cape Wrath. A previous landing site towards the mouth of the Kyle was originally used and is the site of a ruined storehouse.

In 1998, a skull was discovered next to a sub-rectangular cairn to the West of the Kyle. Further excavations of the cairn found two burials, one adult male and one teen of unknown sex. They lived sometime during the 1st century BC to the 1st century AD. Traditionally the practice of burying people in a sub-rectangular cairns was thought to be a Pictish practice but this discovery has led archaeologists to believe this practice started before the Picts.

== See also ==
- Durness
- Cape Wrath
