= Balnakeil =

Coordinates: 58.576°N 4.768°W

Balnakeil: Scottish Gaelic: Baile na Cill
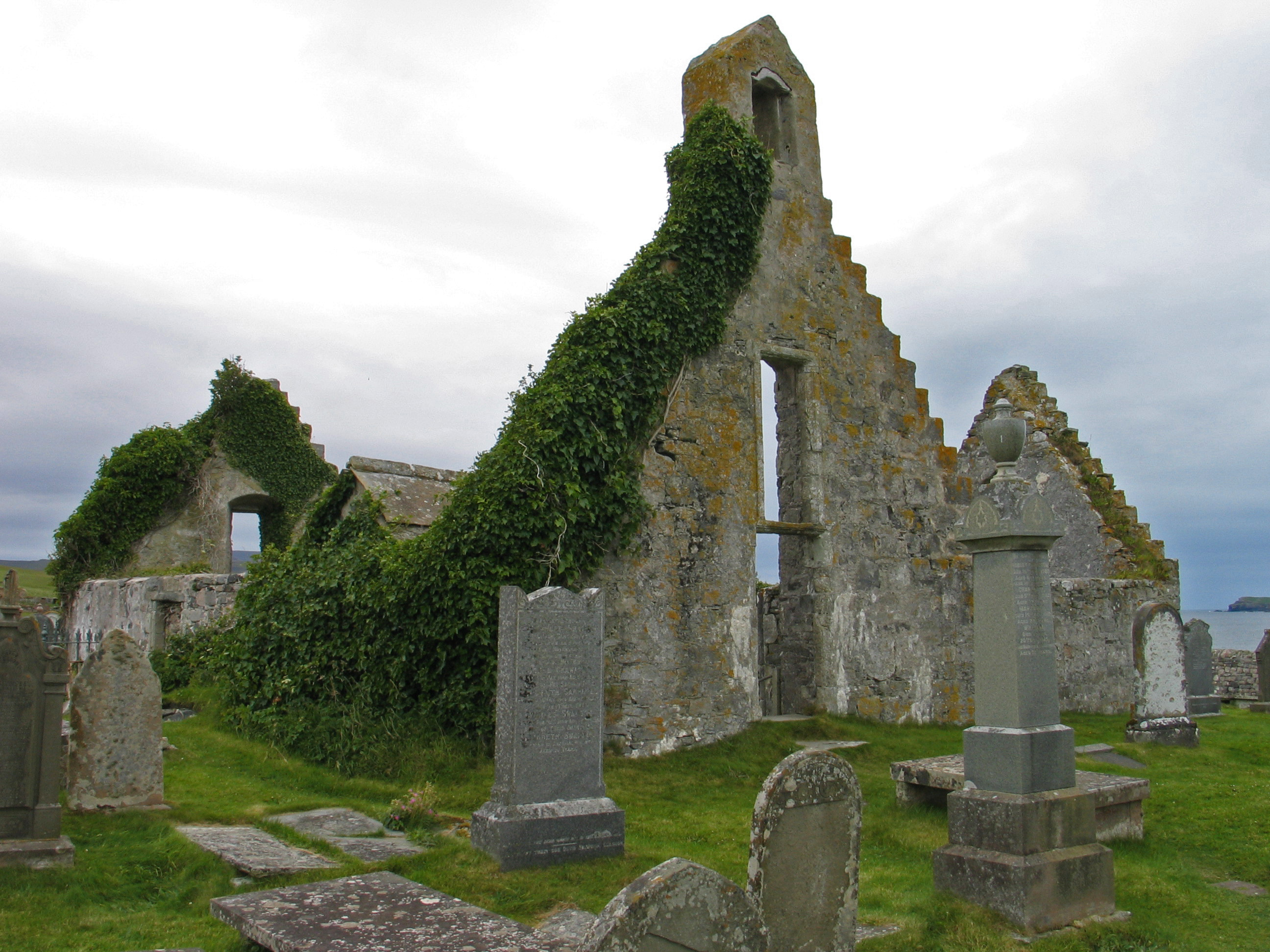
- Ruined church at Balnakeil

- Location within the Sutherland area
- OS grid reference: NC394678
- Council area: Highland
- Lieutenancy area: Sutherland
- Country: Scotland
- Sovereign state: United Kingdom
- Post town: Durness
- Postcode district: IV27 4
- Police: Scotland
- Fire: Scottish
- Ambulance: Scottish

Balnakeil is a hamlet in the parish of Durness, Sutherland, Scottish Highlands, and is in the Scottish council area of Highland. It is on the north coast of Scotland around 3/4 mile (1.2 kilometres) northwest of Durness. The ruin of Balnakeil Church is a scheduled monument. The Kyle of Durness is west of Balnakeil which gives its name to the two-mile-wide (three-kilometre) Balnakeil Bay which the Kyle opens into.

The peninsula of Faraid Head is to the north of Balnakeil. It was the site of a 1950s radar station and remains the range control for Ministry of Defence bombing operations in the Cape Wrath Training Area to the west.

Three small lochs are to the south of Balnakeil: Loch Croispol, Loch Borralie and Loch Caladail. Durness Golf Course is to the southwest.

== See also ==
- Durness
- Faraid Head
- Cape Wrath
