= Durness =

Coordinates: 58.57°N 4.75°W

Durness: Scottish Gaelic: Diùranais
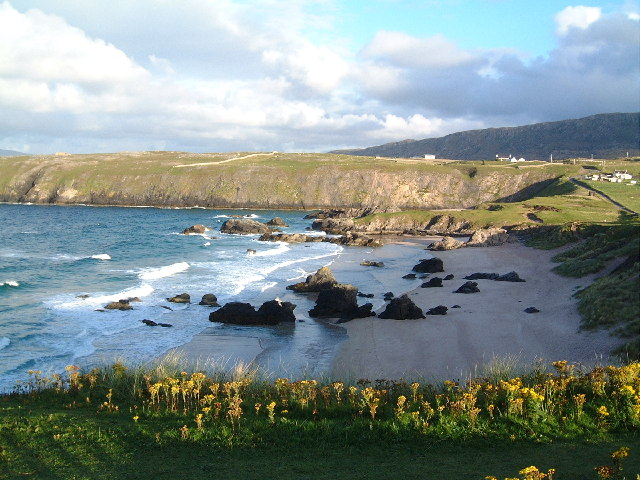
- Sango Bay

- Location within the Sutherland area
- Population: 347 (2011 census)
- OS grid reference: NC403677
  - Edinburgh: 258 mi (415 km)
  - London: 668 mi (1,075 km)
- Council area: Highland
- Lieutenancy area: Sutherland
- Country: Scotland
- Sovereign state: United Kingdom
- Post town: LAIRG
- Postcode district: IV27
- Dialling code: 01971
- Police: Scotland
- Fire: Scottish
- Ambulance: Scottish
- UK Parliament: Caithness, Sutherland and Easter Ross
- Scottish Parliament: Caithness, Sutherland and Ross

Durness (Scottish Gaelic: Diùranais) is a village and civil parish in the north-west Highlands of Scotland. It lies on the north coast of the country in the traditional county of Sutherland, around 120 miles (190 kilometres) north of Inverness. The area is remote, and the parish is huge and sparsely populated, covering an area from east of Loch Eriboll to Cape Wrath, the most northwesterly point of the Scottish mainland.

The population is dispersed and includes a number of townships including Kempie, Eriboll, Laid, Rispond, Sangobeg, Leirinmore, Smoo, Sangomore, Durine, Balnakeil and Keoldale.

== Etymology ==
The name could be Norse "Dyrnes", meaning "deer/animal headland". No one knows for sure where the name derives; it has variously been translated as from "Dorainn nis" tempest point, or "Dhu thir nis" the point of the black land; or from the Norse for deerpoint. Or even from the main village "Durine" which would translate as "Dubh Rinn" the black (or fertile) promontory, with the Norse "ness" tacked onto an existing Gaelic name.

== Prehistory ==
The area has been inhabited since prehistoric times. To the south of the village at the former township of Cnocbreac can be seen the remains of two parallel turf dykes of Neolithic origin, the purpose of which is unknown. Archaeological investigations in 1995 turned up Neolithic, Norse and Iron Age artifacts in four caves (Smoo Cave, Glassknapper's Cave, Antler Cave and Wetweather Cave) a few hundred metres from Durness.

The majority of the artifacts from the caves were related to Viking/Norse or medieval activity. Fish bones, marine shells, plant remains and mammal and bird bones indicated the processing and consumption of marine and terrestrial foods. Iron slag and boat nails led the archaeologists to surmise that boats were repaired in the sheltered inlet. Four radiocarbon dates from Smoo Cave and Glassknapper's Cave provide evidence for use of these sites between the eighth and 11th centuries AD. In May 1991, the body of a young Viking boy was discovered exposed by the erosion of the sand dunes at Faraid Head. At Sangobeg beach, a probably Viking settlement and the body of a prehistoric (170 BCE–30 CE) child was discovered in 2000.

== History ==
Durness was formerly a part of the bishopric of Caithness and the old house at Balnakeil was originally the bishop's summer residence. The church at Balnakeil dates back to the Culdean monks but the existing ruined church is said to have been built by the monks from Dornoch Cathedral in the 13th century.

At Ceannabeinne lies "Clach a Breitheanas" or the Judgement Stone. This was said to be where judgement was meted out to malefactors and those found guilty were thrown over the cliff to their doom below.

The parish of Durness was for centuries a part of Dùthaich MhicAoidh, the land of the Clan Mackay, who held their title to the land extending from Melvich in the east to Kylesku in the west. The area is also important to the Clan Morrison, who live with their traditional allies, the Clan Mackay. "Many sanguinary battles, still recounted by tradition, were fought between the Mcleods and Macaulays on one side and the Morisons on the other. At last the Morisons were forced to leave Lewis and take refuge with that part of their clan which was settled in Duirness and Edderachyllius, Sutherland, where still, in 1793, the natives were all, except a few, of the three names of Mac Leay, Morison or Mcleod."

Loch Eriboll was used by the battle fleet of King Haakon of Norway on its way south to the disastrous Battle of Largs in 1266. During the Second World War, the battle cruiser "Jamaica" sustained an outbreak of measles on board and was quarantined in the loch for months. At cessation of hostilities in 1945 it saw the surrender of some 30 German U-boats. During the Second World War, the RAF built a Chain Home radar station at Sango near Durness. After the war there was also a ROTOR radar station at Faraid Head near Balnakeil, part of which is used by the modern military range and the accommodation area is used for various crafts.

In the early 19th century the population of the parish was around 1,100, spread widely throughout scattered small townships. The population today is much diminished, with the whole of the Durness area suffering greatly from the Highland Clearances, the first in 1809 and thereafter throughout the greater part of the 19th century until the Crofting Act of the 1886 finally gave crofters a measure of security of tenure. The Durness Riots of 1841 were caused by a clearance when the women of Ceannabeinne township defied the Sheriff Officer sent to deliver the summons of eviction and subsequent disorder occurred at the village inn in Durness when a second attempt was made, causing the officers to be again run out of town.

In the first attempt, in August, 1841, a party of sheriff officers and constables were attacked by a mob of about 400 people who were armed with weapons, at the inn of Durine in the parish of Durness. The whole party were injured by the mob and some of them narrowly escaped with their lives. Their eviction papers were also burned by the mob in the presence of the leading sheriff officer who was of the surname Campbell.

The second attempt was made by the police super-intendant, Phillip Mackay, but he was treated in a similar manner and returned home. Mackay made another attempt with a stronger force on 17 September 1841, again consisting of a party of sheriff officers and special constables, arriving the following evening. They were observed approaching and eventually 200 to 300 local people had gathered, all armed with weapons, to oppose them. The mob made a rush to seize Mackay, but they were defeated and Mackay and his men made it to the inn. However, the local mob now with an additional 100 people, smashed the windows and broke down the doors. The constables were all dragged outside and given similar treatment as before, being totally dispersed. The sheriff officers who were in another room were then also dragged outside and dispersed. The locals were later threatened that a military force would be raised against them and did not rise up again.

== Geography ==
The main sources of employment in the village are crofting and tourism. It is the largest village in the northwestern corner of Scotland, has a population of around 400, and is on the A838 road. It is located on the north coast between the towns of Thurso, 72 mi (116 km) to the east, and Ullapool 68 mi (109 km), to the south. This area is notable for being the most sparsely populated region in Western Europe. Until some 50 years ago, Durness was a predominantly Gaelic speaking area.

== Geology ==
The landscape of the Durness area is a stark contrast to the surrounding areas due to a down-faulted, isolated wedge of Cambro-Ordovician Durness Group carbonates, also historically (and often now informally) known as the 'Durness Limestone'. Although the unit outcrops as far south as Skye, the full sequence can only be seen in the Durness area, hence the name of the unit. This thick sequence (c. 800 m or 2,625 ft) of dolomites with subordinate limestones and chert is softer than the surrounding hills which are formed of more resistant Lewisian Gneiss or Torridonian sandstones, sometimes capped by Cambrian Quartzite. As a result, the local area is generally flatter and more fertile than other areas in the North West Highlands due to the carbonate bedrock and resultant lime-rich soils.

An unusually wide variety of rock types for such a relatively small area can be found within the parish. This is partly due to extensive faulting in the area which has placed a variety rocks of different ages (Archaean – Ordovician) in contact with one another. A down-faulted section of the Moine Thrust can also be seen in the area at both Faraid Head and Sango Bay despite the main thrust area being found several miles east at Loch Eriboll. The thrust exposures within Sango Bay are the most accessible localities to observe the Moine Thrust Zone. Additionally, Sango Bay (geologically a graben) also exposes some of the best basin bounding fault outcrops in the British Isles.

Faraid Head is also important geologically for one of Scotland's largest sand dune systems where the prominent headland is exposed to strong winds, building a variety of sand dunes types up to 60 metres (200 ft) above sea level. The cliffs on the eastern side of this headland show the only preserved exposures of Moine metasediments west of the main outcrop of the Moine Thrust in Scotland (as a result of thrusting and later normal-faulting) and excellent machair examples have developed between the cliff top and the dunes, partly due to the high sea-shell content of the sands in the Durness area.

As a result, Durness is part of the North West Highlands Geopark and is a popular destination for both postgraduate and undergraduate geology students during the summer.

== Tourism ==
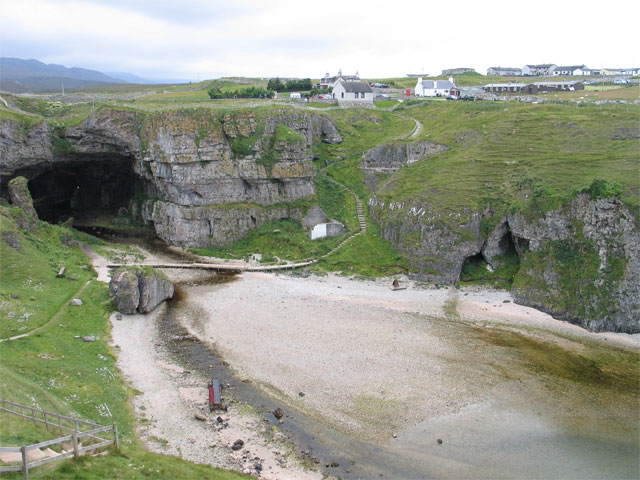
Durness with Smoo Cave; the youth hostel is upper right

Tourists are catered for by a campsite spectacularly sited on the cliffs above the beach (with easy access down to the beach), a hostel operated by Hostelling Scotland (housed in some converted army buildings), bed and breakfast accommodation, and two hotels and restaurants: Mackay's and the Smoo Cave Hotel. The village is also used as a base by visitors to Cape Wrath.

The main attractions in Durness are Smoo Cave, a conjoined sea cave and freshwater cave with a small river running through it and a waterfall in wet weather, unspoilt beaches backed by cliffs and the local seabirds, seals, porpoises and minke whales. The surrounding coastline is some of Europe's most isolated and spectacular, with the nearby Clo Mor Cliffs being the highest on the British mainland, at 922 feet (281 m) high.

Balnakeil Old Church, is a scheduled monument with the grave of Donuill Mac Morraichaidh, a serial bandit and murderer, inside one wall of the church so, it is said, "that his enemies couldn't walk over his grave". The area around Loch Croispol and Loch Borrallie abounds in archeological interest, from brochs to round houses to medieval and pre-clearances settlements.

The Balnakeil Craft Village can be found approximately 1 mile (1.5 kilometres) outside Durness and is a collection of former MoD units dating from the 1950s, which now house various independent shops.

== Culture and community ==
Durness is the birthplace and burial site of the poet Rob Donn, born at Achnacaillich in Strathmore in 1714. The Gaelic publication Am Fèillire remarked, in 1875, that he was known for being shrewd and satirical, as well as moral and mannerly.

== John Lennon ==
In 2007 Durness hosted the John Lennon Northern Lights Festival, a celebration of music, poetry, theatre and other cultural activities in celebration of the spirit of John Lennon who, when in childhood, took summer holidays in the village. Lennon returned for a visit in 1969 with Yoko Ono and their children but the visit was cut short when Lennon drove his car off the road by Loch Eriboll. The track "In My Life" from Rubber Soul is said to be based on a poem about Durness which Lennon wrote on a teenage holiday in the area, although most of the original poem's meaning was lost during songwriting with Paul McCartney.

A monument dedicated to John Lennon has been erected in a memorial garden by the village hall and has three large stone slabs inscribed with lyrics from “In My Life”. The house where he stayed has now been demolished and replaced with a modern house. A plaque on the gable of the new house reads “John Lennon 1940-1980 Singer and Songwriter and member of The Beatles Spent many childhood holidays here”.

The Balnakeil craft village, established in 1963 on an unused military radar station near to Durness was the subject of a 1974 BBC documentary "The Road to Balnakeil" by Derek Cooper. Ceramic artist Lotte Glob was among early residents. The village is home to well-known chocolate manufacturers Cocoa Mountain.

There are claims that the rugged scenery around Durness and Cape Wrath may have inspired Tolkien in creating his Middle Earth epics.

A bench placed on the shore of Loch Borralie by actress Juliet Stevenson commemorates her elder brother Johnny who died in a car accident at the Kyle of Durness in 2000.

== Transport ==
Durness is on the A838 road. This links the parish to the A836 at Tongue to the east, and loops around the coast through Rhiconich near Kinlochbervie, to meet the A836 again north of Lairg, which generally runs to Bonar Bridge and the south. The road is single track along most of its length. Bus services are sparse in the area, although one bus a day from Monday to Saturday links Durness with the Far North railway line at Lairg railway station and also continues on to Inverness. The Lairg railway station provides rail services north to Wick and south to Inverness. All bus services around Durness are provided by Durness Bus, with one bus also going to Wick. A local Dial-a-Ride bus system is also available from Monday to Friday

== Education ==
Durness primary school educates children from nursery age to age 11. In the 2012–13 academic year the school had 22 children enrolled, a figure which is predicted to decline to 13 by 2026–27. Children transfer to Kinlochbervie High School which opened in the 1990s. Before this school opened children had to lodge during the week to attend schools at Dornoch Academy or Golspie High School.

== Military Presence ==
Cape Wrath, to the west of the parish across the Kyle of Durness is the site of the Cape Wrath Training Area, a military live firing range. The area is used for gunnery practice by naval and air forces as well as a training area for land forces. It is the only military firing range in the UK where aircraft are allowed to deliver 1,000-pound (450-kilogram) bombs.

== See also ==
- List of listed buildings in Durness, Highland
