= Local landscape designation =

UK government designation

A local landscape designation is a non-statutory conservation designation used by local government in some parts of the United Kingdom to categorise sensitive landscapes which are, either legally or as a matter of policy, protected from development or other man-made influences. A local authority will typically produce a Landscape Assessment to define such areas.

An LLD may also be known as an Area of Great Landscape Value, Special Landscape Area, or Area of Special Landscape Importance. If an area is designated as an AGLV, this restricts development in the area, especially if it will affect the distinctive character or quality of the landscape.

== See also ==
- Area of Outstanding Natural Beauty
- Conservation in the United Kingdom
