= Achriesgill =

Coordinates: 58.44385°N 4.99207°W

Achriesgill: Scottish Gaelic: Achadh Rìdhisgil
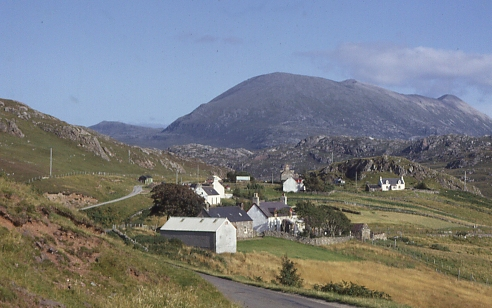
- Eastern part of Achriesgill

- Location within the Sutherland area
- OS grid reference: NC254545
- Council area: Highland
- Country: Scotland
- Sovereign state: United Kingdom
- Postcode district: IV27 4
- Police: Scotland
- Fire: Scottish
- Ambulance: Scottish
- UK Parliament: Caithness, Sutherland and Easter Ross
- Scottish Parliament: Caithness, Sutherland and Ross

Achriesgill (Scottish Gaelic: Achadh Rìdhisgil) is a village that lies on the eastern bank of Loch Inchard in Sutherland, in the Scottish council area of Highland. The village is on the road to Kinlochbervie.

In 1945, a documentary on the Scottish agricultural tradition of crofting called Crofters was released, which was both filmed in and featured Achriesgill.
