= Badcall, Rhiconich =

Coordinates: 58.45542°N 5.02290°W

Badcall: Scottish Gaelic: Bada Call
- Location within the Sutherland area
- OS grid reference: NC237245
- Council area: Highland
- Lieutenancy area: Sutherland
- Country: Scotland
- Sovereign state: United Kingdom
- Post town: Lairg
- Postcode district: IV27 4
- Police: Scotland
- Fire: Scottish
- Ambulance: Scottish

Badcall is a remote crofting township, located on the northern shore of the sea loch, Loch Inchard, in Sutherland, Scottish Highlands and is in the Scottish council area of Highland.

The township is located 1.5 miles east of Kinlochbervie.
