= Rhiconich =

Coordinates: 58.423°N 4.985°W

Rhiconich: Scottish Gaelic: An Ruigh Còinnich
- Location within the Sutherland area
- OS grid reference: NC257522
- Council area: Highland
- Lieutenancy area: Sutherland
- Country: Scotland
- Sovereign state: United Kingdom
- Post town: Lairg
- Postcode district: IV27 4
- Police: Scotland
- Fire: Scottish
- Ambulance: Scottish

Rhiconich is a remote hamlet, located at the head of Loch Inchard, in Sutherland, Scottish Highlands in the Scottish council area of Highland. Rhiconich is situated 3 miles (4.8 km) north-east of Laxford Bridge and 11 miles (18 km) south-west of Durness on the A838 road. The B801 at Richonich links the village of Kinlochbervie and associated crofting townships such as Oldshoremore to the A838.
