= Oldshoremore =

Coordinates: 58.47615°N 5.06882°W

Oldshoremore: Scottish Gaelic: Àisir Mòr
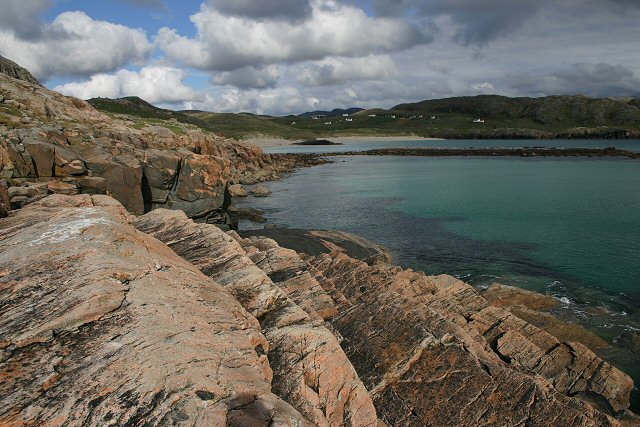
- View of Oldshoremore from the slopes of Eilean na h-Aiteig

- Location within the Sutherland area
- OS grid reference: NC211583
- Civil parish: Eddrachillis
- Council area: Highland
- Lieutenancy area: Sutherland
- Country: Scotland
- Sovereign state: United Kingdom
- Postcode district: IV27 4
- Police: Scotland
- Fire: Scottish
- Ambulance: Scottish

Oldshoremore is a scattered crofting hamlet in the Eddrachillis parish of Sutherland, Scotland. It incorporates around twenty houses, though several of these are holiday homes.

Once owned by the Duke of Sutherland, Oldshoremore and the surrounding area are now part of the Sandwood Estate, a nature reserve owned by the John Muir Trust. Directly west lies Oldshoremore Bay, a sandy beach with a large headland at its northern end known as Eilean na h-Aiteig. The hamlet also contains a car park, toilet facilities, a post box, and a cemetery. A small loch known as Loch Àisir lies to the east.

The nearest sizeable settlement is Kinlochbervie, which lies approximately one mile (1.5 kilometres) southeast. The hamlet of Oldshore Beg lies to the northwest.

== Gallery ==
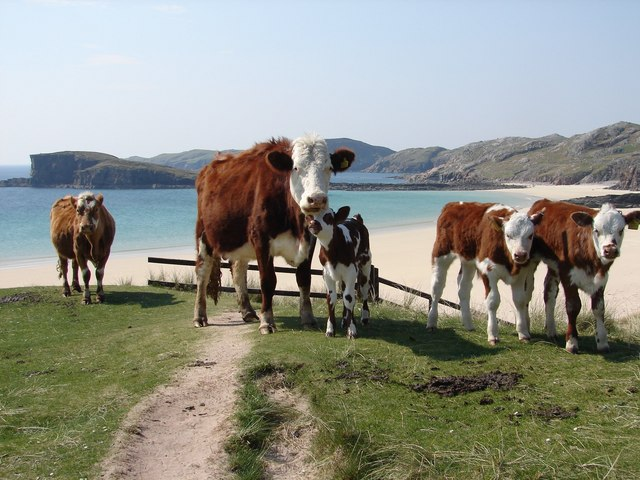
Cattle on the southern path to the beach

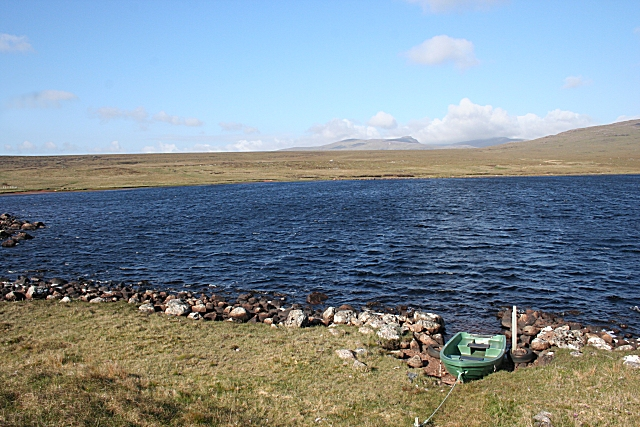
The loch

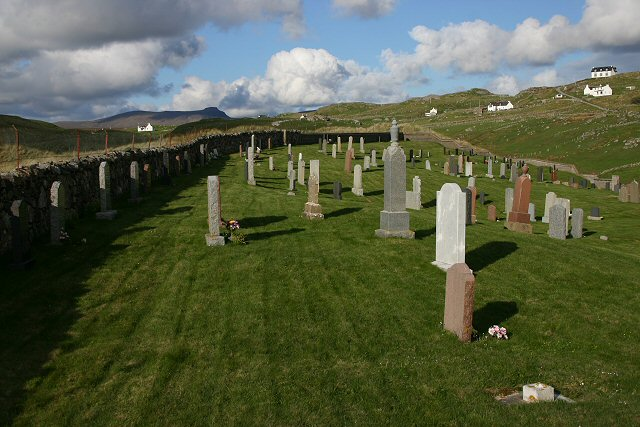
The cemetery

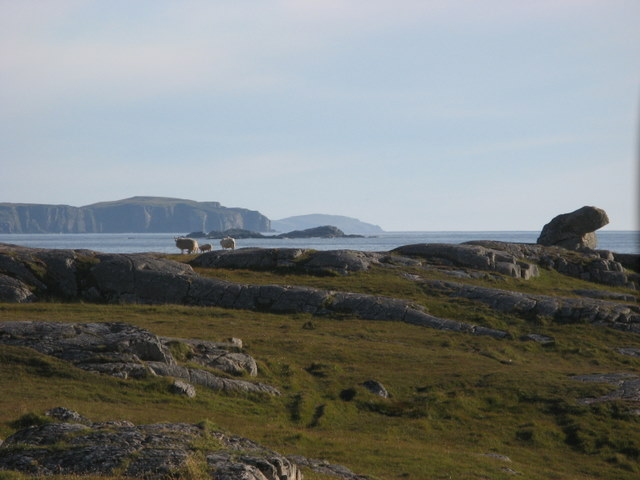
The 'frog rock'

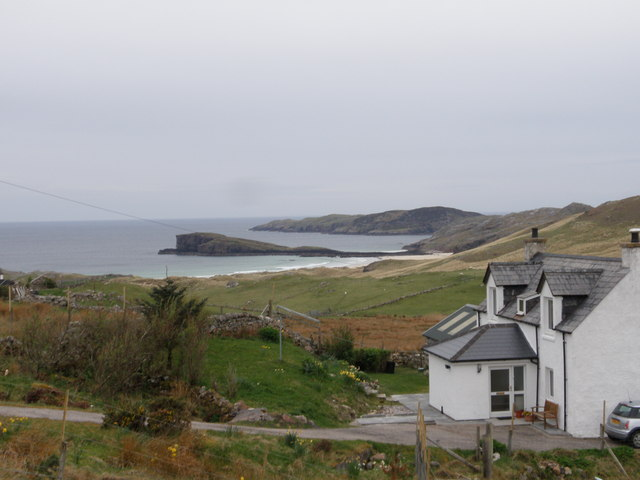
View of the bay from the road
