= Kinlochbervie =

Coordinates: 58.46°N 5.05°W

Kinlochbervie: Scottish Gaelic: Ceann Loch Biorbhaidh
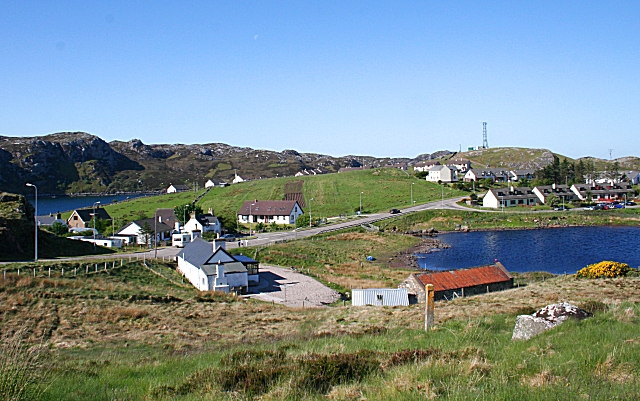
- Kinlochbervie from the war memorial.

- Location within the Sutherland area
- Population: 410 (2011)
- OS grid reference: NC220563
  - Edinburgh: 187 mi (301 km)
  - London: 518 mi (834 km)
- Council area: Highland
- Lieutenancy area: Sutherland
- Country: Scotland
- Sovereign state: United Kingdom
- Post town: LAIRG
- Postcode district: IV27
- Dialling code: 01971
- Police: Scotland
- Fire: Scottish
- Ambulance: Scottish
- UK Parliament: Caithness, Sutherland and Easter Ross
- Scottish Parliament: Caithness, Sutherland and Ross

Kinlochbervie (Scottish Gaelic: Ceann Loch Biorbhaidh, IPA: [ˈkʲʰaun̪ˠˈɫ̪ɔxˈpiɾivɪ]) is a scattered harbour village in the north west of Sutherland, in the Highland region of Scotland. It is the most northerly port on the west coast of Scotland.

== Geography ==
Sandwood Bay, a scenic beach, is about a five-mile (eight-kilometre) drive or a four-mile (six-kilometre) walk north of Kinlochbervie. Other scenic areas close to the village include Oldshoremore Beach and Rhiconich.

== Fishing ==
The Annual Reports of the Fishery Board for Scotland provide an insight into fishing in Kinlochbervie in the years before the First World War.

Fishery Statistics

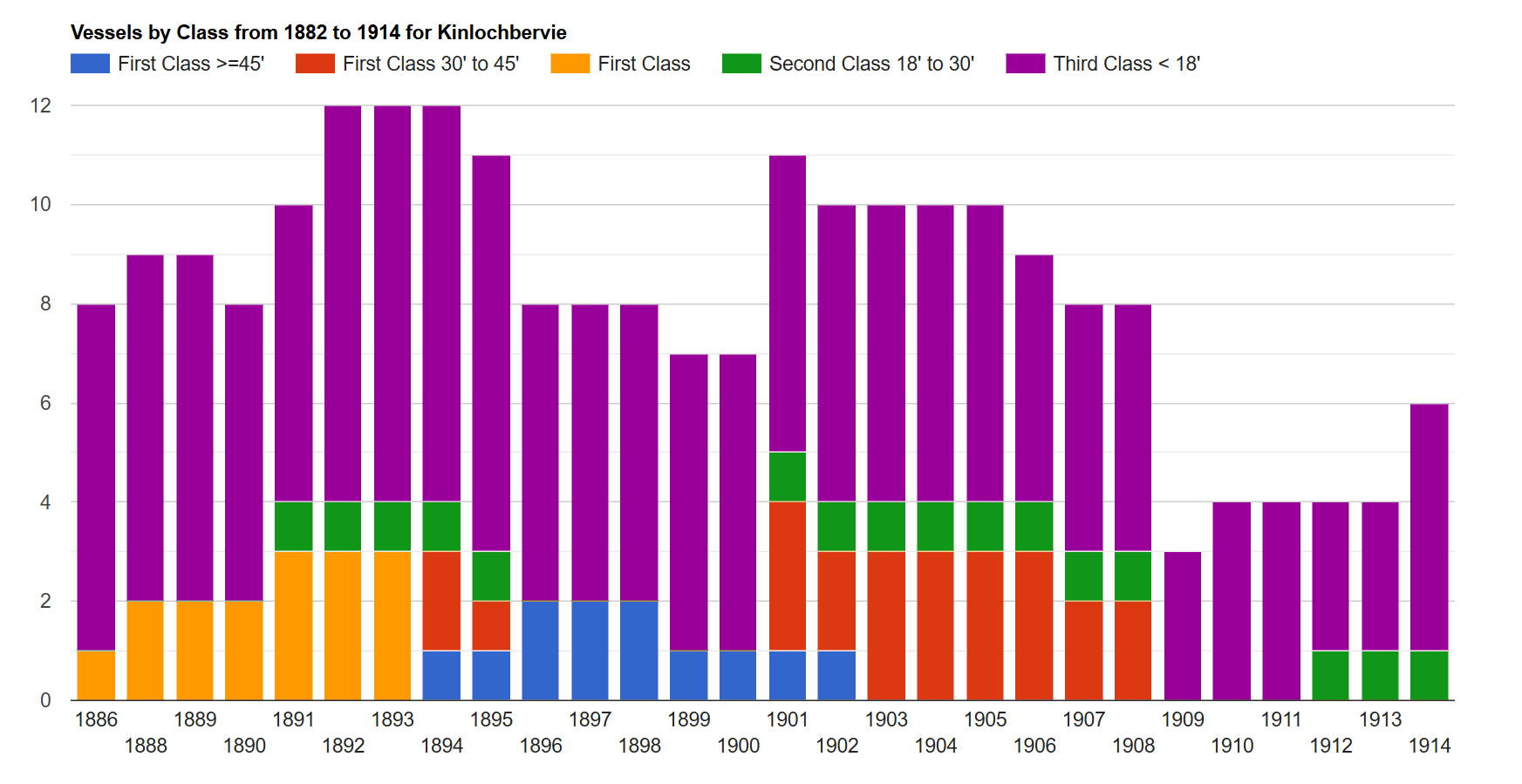
Vessels by class

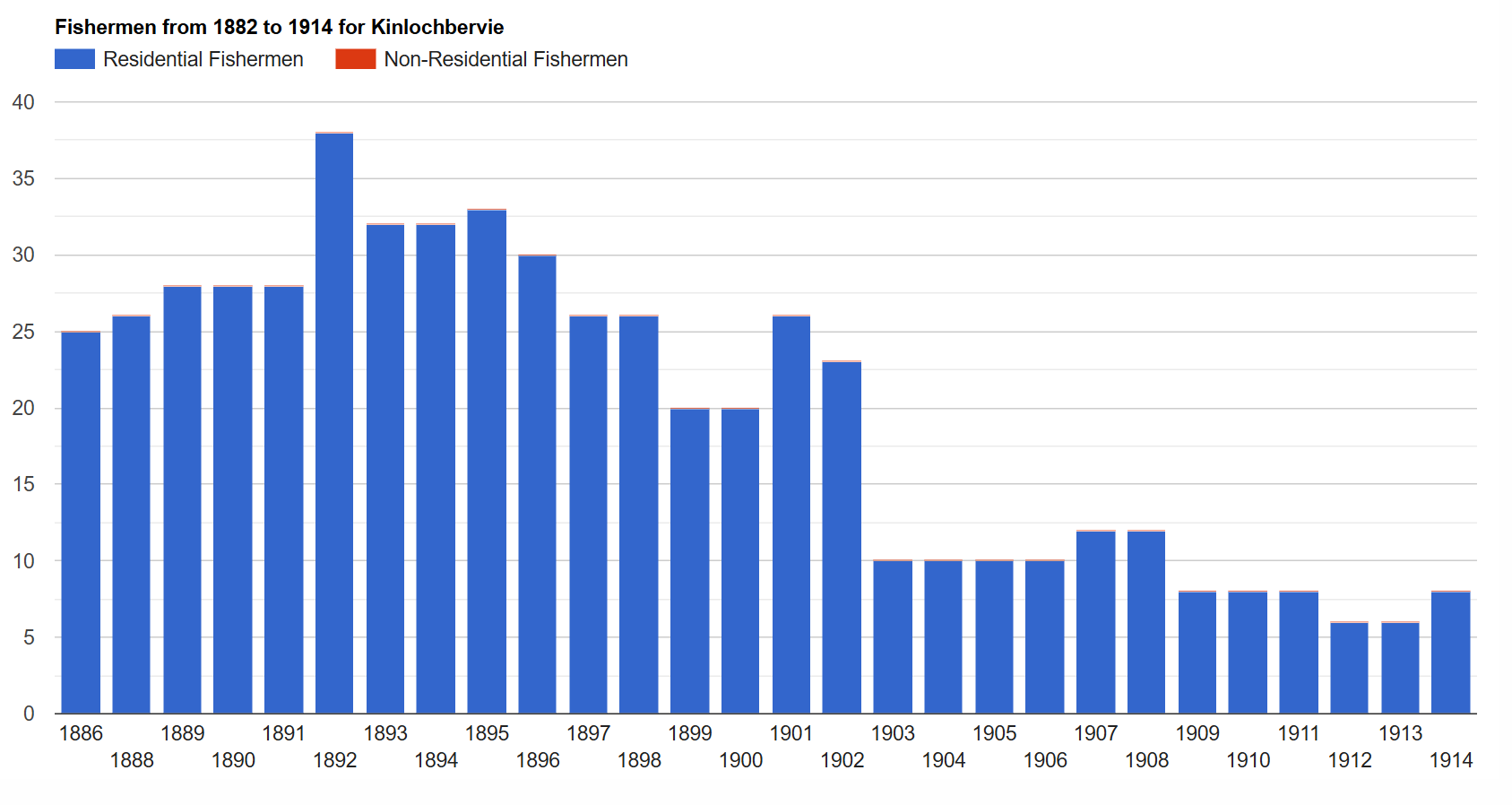
Fishermen

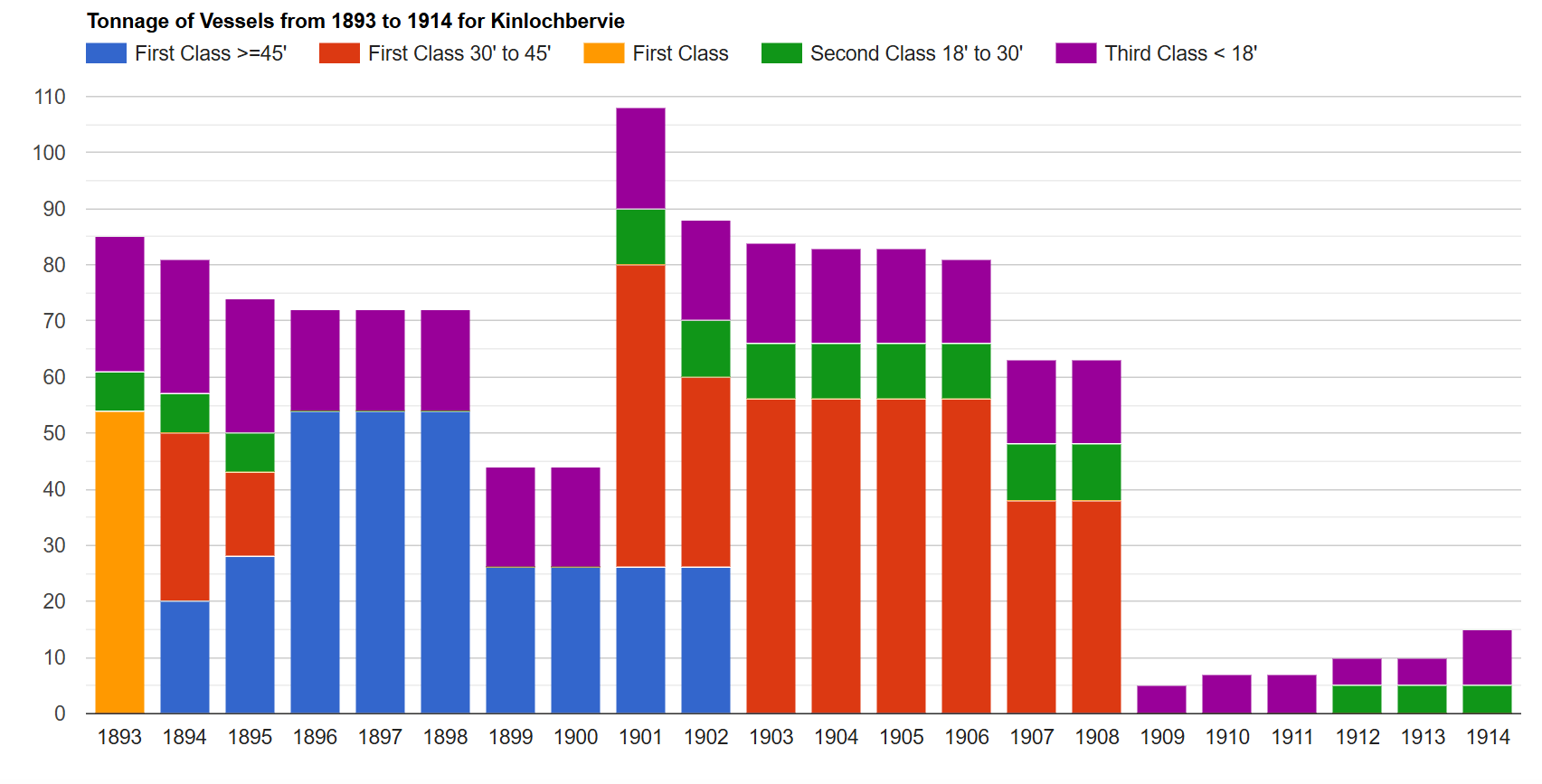
Tonnage of vessels

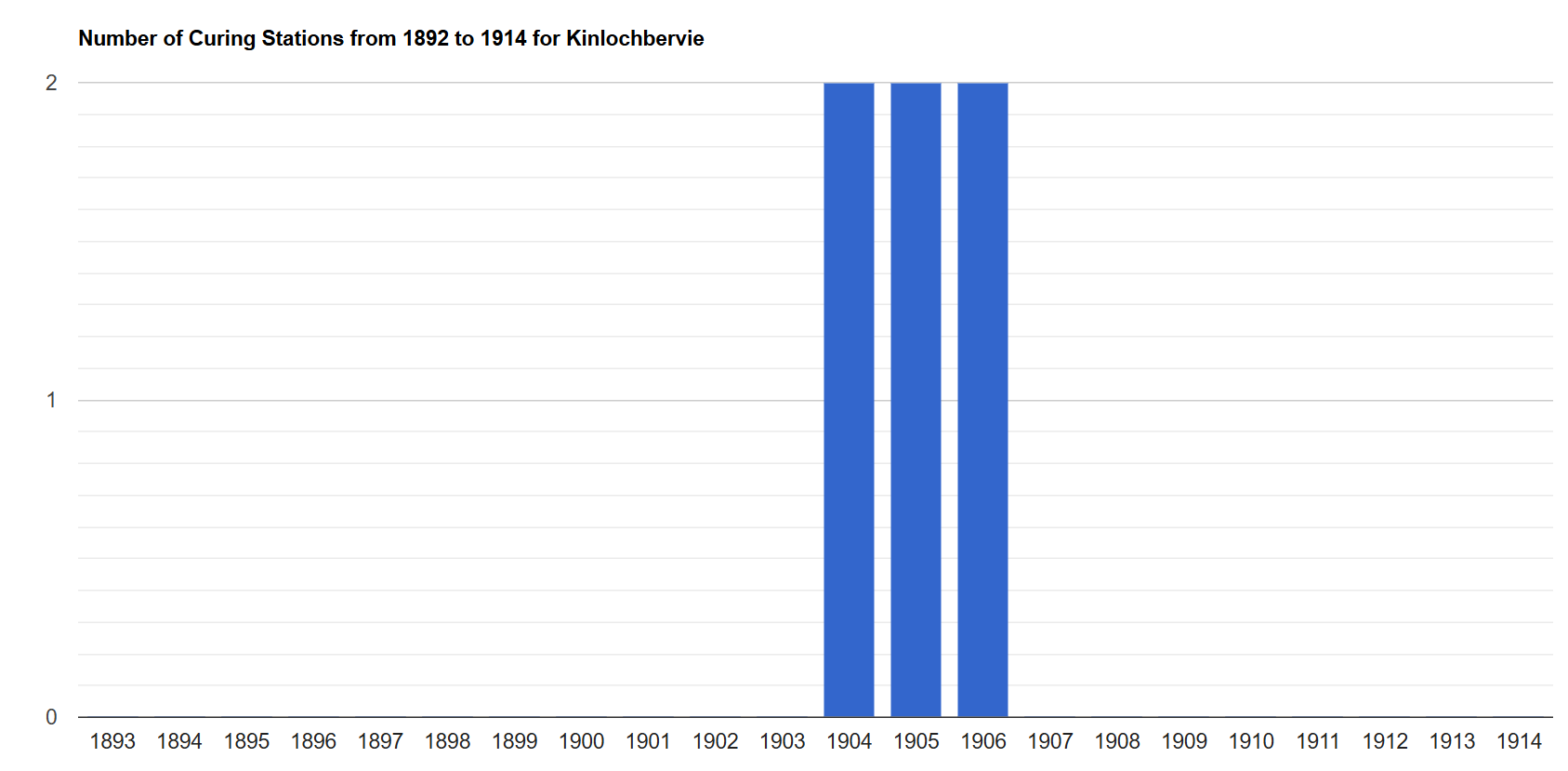
Number of curing stations

The majority of present-day local industry is based upon fishing. Although the fleet of ships actually based in Kinlochbervie is rather small, many ships from the east coast of Scotland land their catches in Kinlochbervie. The dominant feature of the town is the large fish handling depot. From here catches are loaded onto large refrigerated lorries for transport by road throughout Europe. The importance of this link to the outside world to the local economy means that Kinlochbervie has surprisingly good road links, given its remote location and rugged local geography.

== Tourism ==
The local scenery is a tourist attraction and is also an important part of the local economy. There are many holiday homes and small bed and breakfast businesses in the area. The largest in the village is Kinlochbervie Hotel.

== Sports ==
The village also has a rather successful amateur football team, which competes in the local amateur league along with Durness, Tongue, Bettyhill, Lochinver and Melvich. In 2005 they won the league trophy, the prestigious Stafford Cup, for the first time in many years. The team also won The Guy Cup in the same year by winning a tournament of local teams. This was the first time a team west of the Kyle of Tongue had won it.

The sport of shinty has recently been resurrected in Kinlochbervie by the local school, shinty was once played across North Sutherland until the 20th century, but never competitively. Kinlochbervie Camanachd Club now competes at junior level against teams from across the Highlands.

== Cultural references ==
The village features prominently in Irish writer Brian Friel's play Faith Healer. Sailor Frank Dye started his 650-nautical-mile (1,200-kilometre) journey to Iceland in a small Wayfarer dinghy from the village in 1963.

== Time Team ==
Divers from Time Team explored the waters off the coast of Kinlochbervie, about 20 metres (65 ft) below the sea's surface after a shipwreck and artefacts were discovered by divers from RAF Lossiemouth. The artefacts found included two anchors, five iron cannons and Spanish pottery from the 16th century. The site was designated as a Historic Maritime Protected Area in 2013. The episode was first broadcast on Sunday 20 January 2002.

== Gallery ==
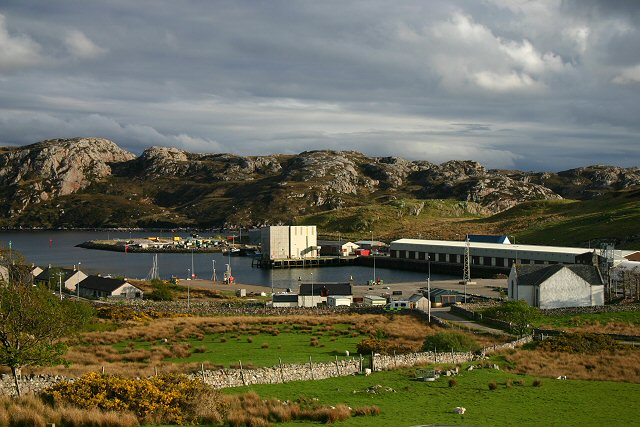
Kinlochbervie Harbour

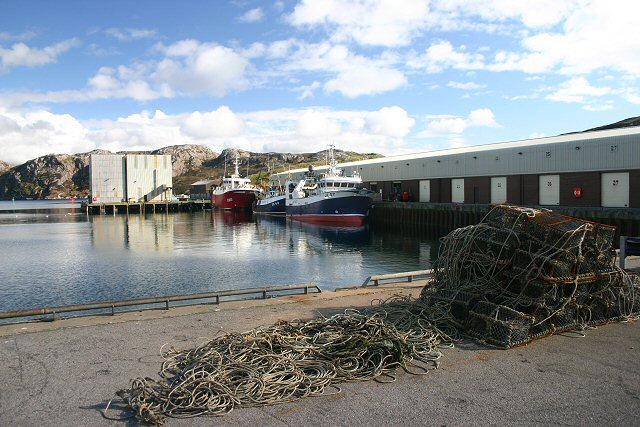
Trawlers docked at Kinlochbervie Harbour

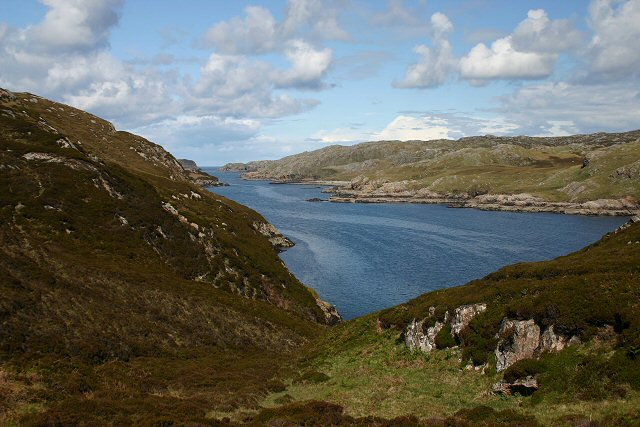
Loch Clash

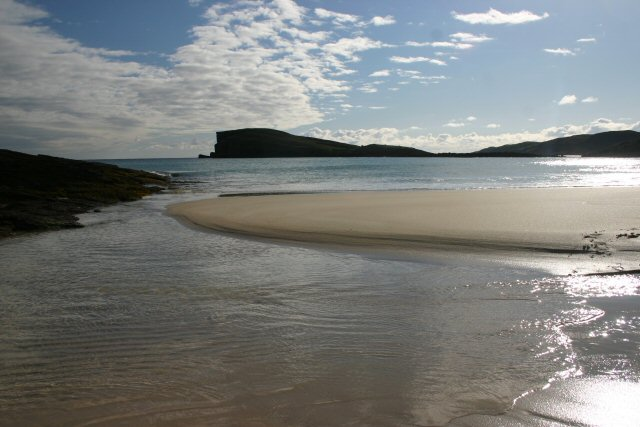
Oldshoremore Beach
