= North West Sutherland National Scenic Area =

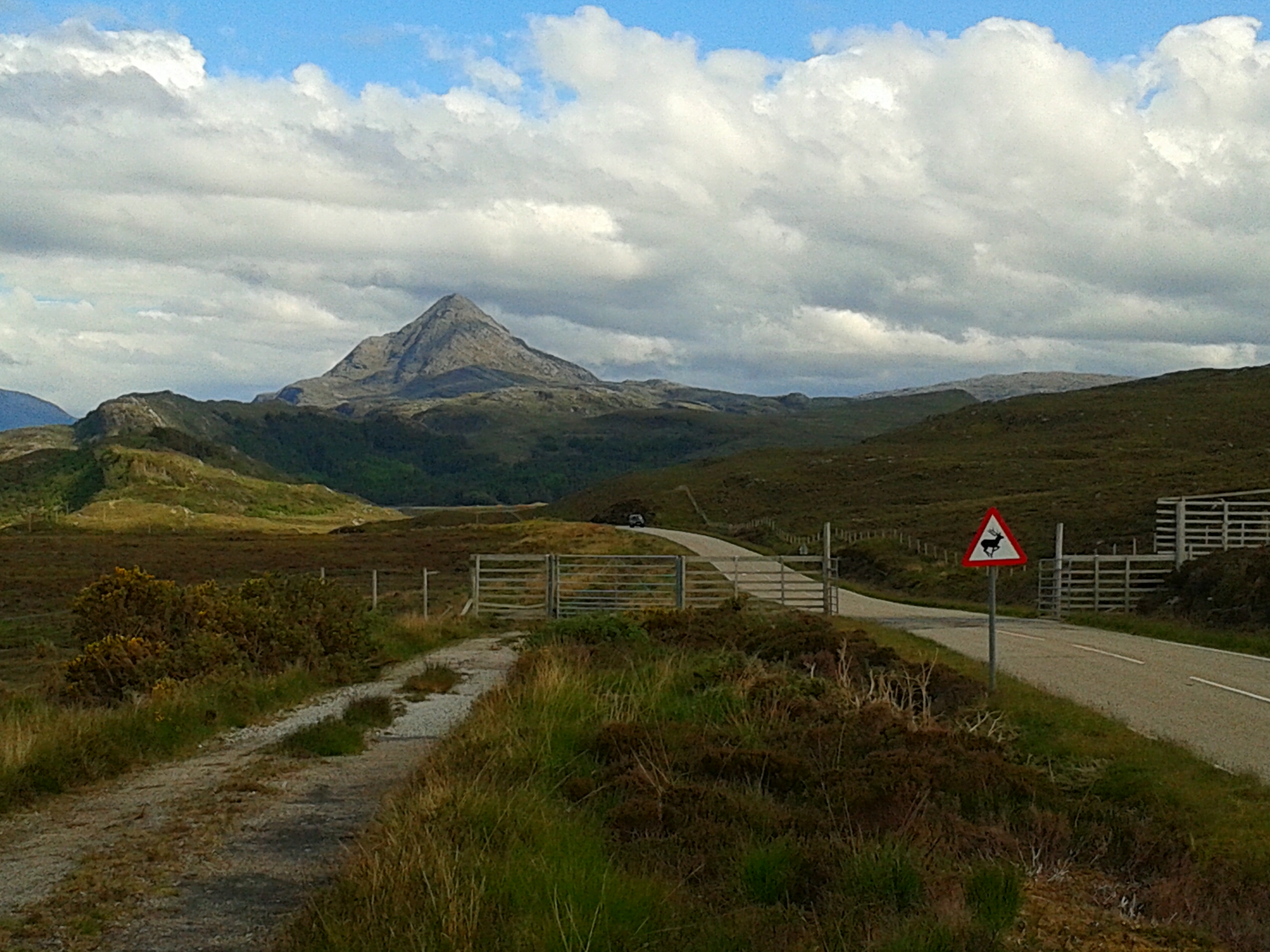
- Ben Stack seen from the A838 road

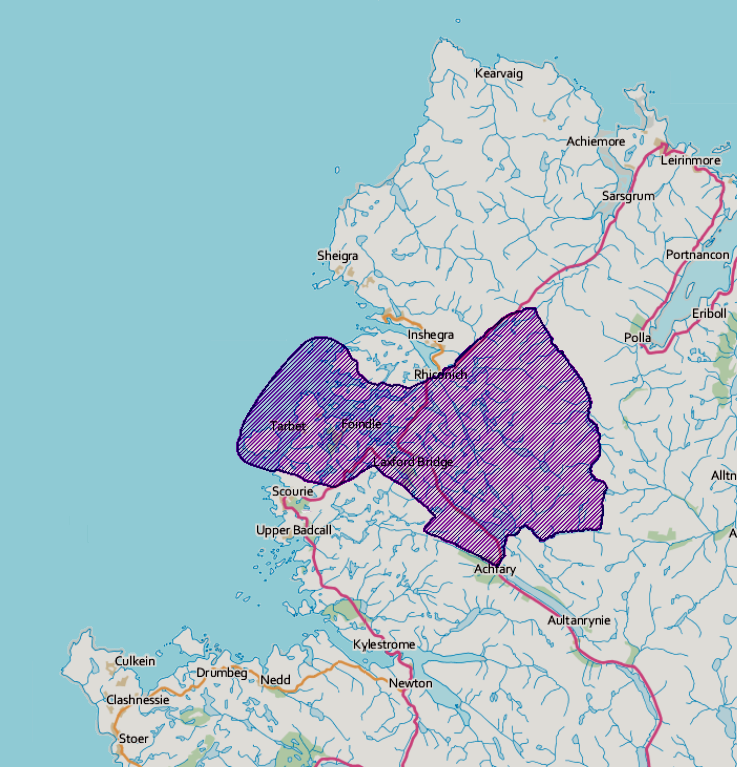
- Location and extent of the North West Sutherland NSA.
- Location: Sutherland, Highland, Scotland
- Coordinates: 58.37033°N 4.90485°W
- Area: 266 km^{2} (103 sq mi)
- Established: 1981
- Governing body: NatureScot

North West Sutherland is a national scenic area (NSA) covering the mountains and coastal scenery of the northwestern part of the county of Sutherland in the Scottish Highlands. The designated area covers the mountains of Foinaven, Arkle and Ben Stack as well as the coastal scenery surrounding Loch Laxford and Handa Island. It is one of 40 such areas in Scotland, which are defined so as to identify areas of exceptional scenery and to ensure its protection by restricting certain forms of development. The North West Sutherland NSA covers 26,565 ha in total, consisting of 23,415 ha of land with a further 3,151 ha being marine (i.e. below low tide).

National scenic areas are primarily designated due to the scenic qualities of an area, however NSAs may well have other special qualities, for example related to culture, history, archaeology, geology or wildlife. Areas with such qualities may be protected via other national and international designations that overlap with the NSA designation. North West Sutherland includes several Natura 2000 sites within the designated area of the NSA.

In Gaelic the area is known as Ceathramh Garb, meaning the "Rough Quarter".

== Creation of the national scenic area ==
Following the Second World War, a committee, chaired by Sir Douglas Ramsay, was established to consider preservation of the landscape in Scotland. The report, published in 1945 proposed that five areas (Loch Lomond and the Trossachs, the Cairngorms, Glen Coe-Ben Nevis-Black Mount, Wester Ross and Glen Strathfarrar-Glen Affric-Glen Cannich) should receive a level of protection. Accordingly, the government designated these areas as "national park direction areas", giving powers for planning decisions taken by local authorities to be reviewed by central government. Following a further review of landscape protection in 1978, additional areas, including the remote northwestern parts of Sutherland, were identified as worthy of protection due to their landscape qualities. Accordingly, in 1981 the direction areas were replaced by the national scenic area designation, which were based on the 1978 recommendations and thus included the area entitled North West Sutherland. The defined area remains as originally mapped in 1978, but was redesignated under new legislation in 2010.

Although the national scenic area designation provides a degree of additional protection via the planning process, there are no bodies equivalent to a national park authority, and whilst local authorities (in this case Highland Council) can produce a management strategy for each one, only the three national scenic areas within Dumfries and Galloway have current management strategies.

== Landscape and scenery ==
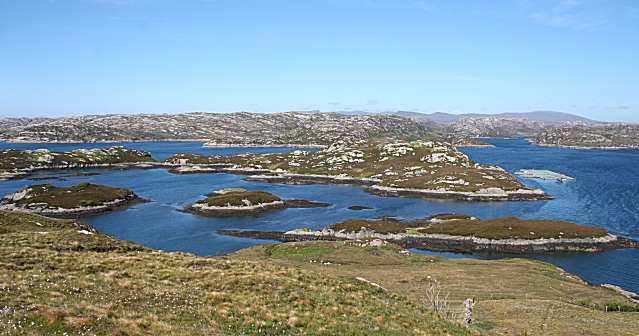
Islands in Loch Laxford.

The original 1978 report that led to the area being designated as a national scenic area noted:

Foinaven, Arkle and Ben Stack are mountains of quartzite resting dramatically on Lewisian gneiss. Ben Stack (721m) is a shapely remnant cone, Arkle (787m) a whale-back, and Foinaven (909m) a long slab broken into separate summits. The summits and flanks of the latter two form a stark desert of white quartzite scree broken occasionally by lines of tiered crags. The knock and lochan topography of the gneiss landscape extending to the west forms a suitable foil for this varied trio, as hard and uncompromising as the mountains themselves. Loch Laxford is made up of the same bare rocky topography and is clearly related to the mountain core of the area. Its indented coast does not have the wooded inlets and bays that are found further south, but there are some sheltered beaches from which Handa Island with its towering sandstone cliffs and bird colonies can be seen.

— SNH (1978)

Much of the area is uninhabited and uncultivated, with only a few small crofting townships such as Fanagmore and Foindle at the coast, and isolated shooting lodges in the interior. The underlying geology of the area is very much in evidence throughout the NSA, with the Moine Thrust being a key feature of the natural history of the area. The soil is thin, and pockets of woodland are rare.

== Conservations designations ==
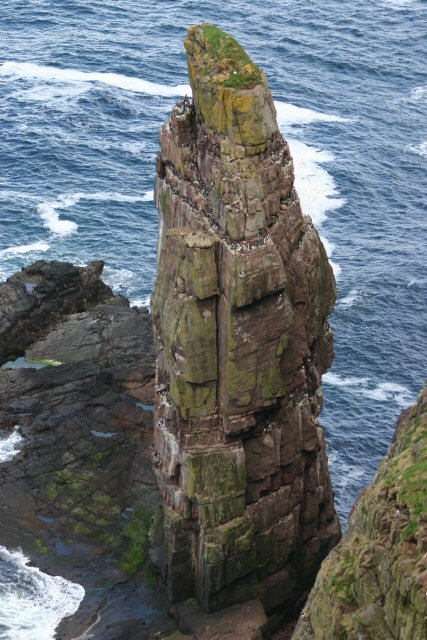
A small sea stack on Handa Island.

There are two Special Protection Areas (SPAs) and two Special Areas of Conservation (SACs) within or overlapping with the NSA:

- Handa Island, and the sea surrounding it, are designated as an SPA due to its importance for breeding seabirds. The designation lists six priority species: fulmar, great skua, guillemot, kittiwake, and razorbill. The island is managed by the Scottish Wildlife Trust.
- The mountainous area surrounding Foinaven and Arkle is designated as an SPA due to the presence of a breeding population of golden eagles.
- The Foinaven area is also designated as a SAC, with several priority habitats being represented within the area. The designation also refers to the presence of freshwater pearl mussels and otters.
- Loch Laxford is designated as an SPA due to the presence of reefs and shallow inlets and bays. Water conditions are mostly sheltered because of the reefs and islands but the outer region of the loch is very exposed. It has the most extensive shoreline of sheltered sediment in the far northwest of Scotland.
