= 1890 Sutherland County Council election =

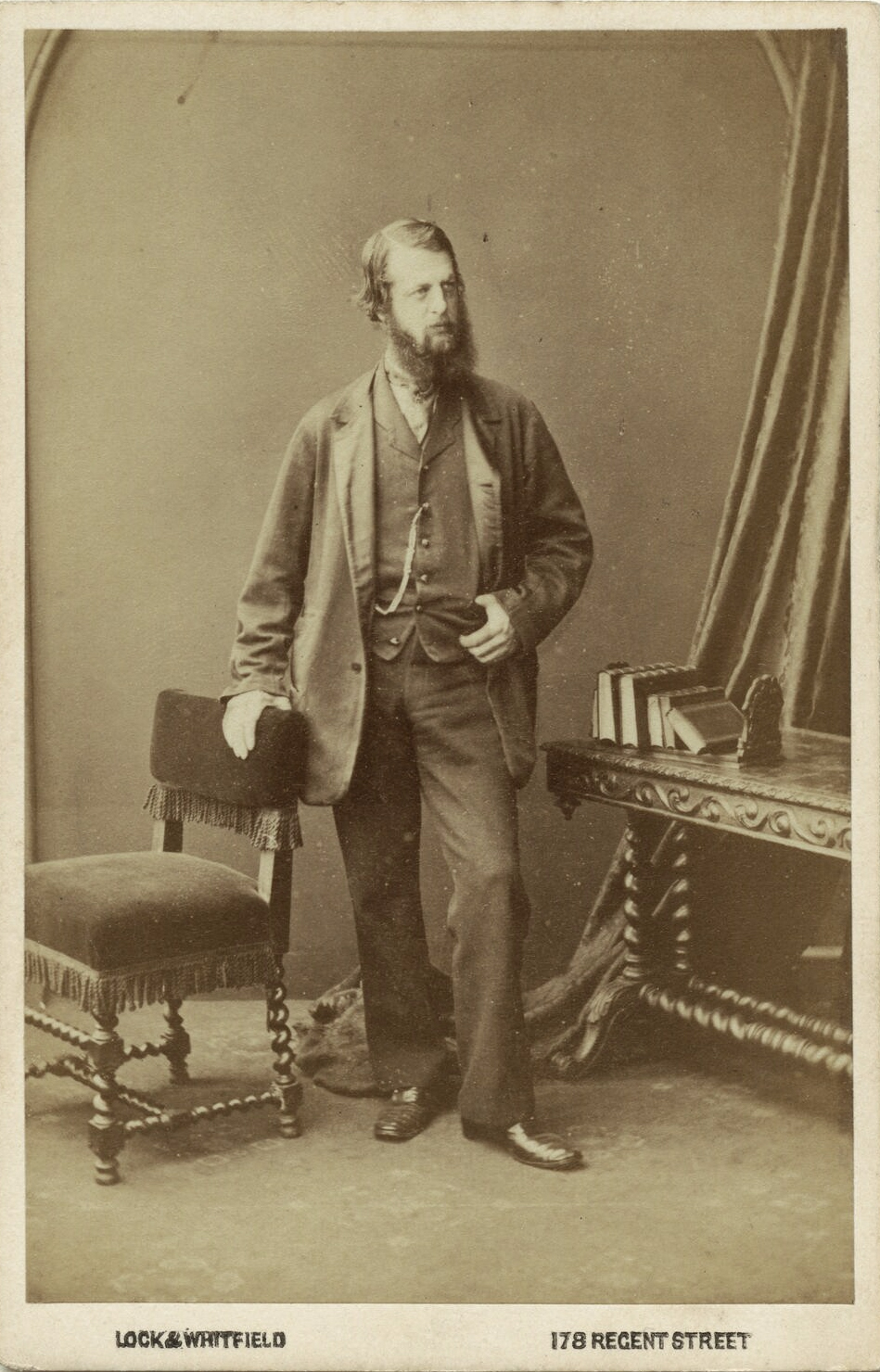
The election saw political control in the county fully pass from the Duke of Sutherland, whose estate saw only one member returned.

The first elections to Sutherland County Council were held in February 1890 as part of the wider 1890 local elections. County councils had been created in Scotland by the Local Government (Scotland) Act 1889, following on from the Local Government Act 1888 which had created them in England and Wales.

The election took place at a time of great change in Sutherland. The Crofters' Holdings (Scotland) Act 1886 (49 & 50 Vict. c. 29) had established the first Crofters Commission, which acted as a land court which ruled on disputes between landlords and crofters. The largest land owner in the county was the Duke of Sutherland, who owned the Sutherland estate, comprising most of the county.

To ensure the Duke's interest was represented on the new council all of the Sutherlands estates factors stood for election, along with James Gordon; the Assynt sub-factor. The estate anticipated defeat in the election having lost control of School and Poor boards in the early 1880s. Ultimately only Donald MacLean won a seat on behalf of the Sutherland interest. Despite having been anticipated, the estate was shocked by the scale of their loss, which they blamed on local land leaguers, merchants, ministers, and school teachers, as well as the fact that the vote was no longer secret. Evander McIver, a Lewis-man and factor for Scourie, complained that the new council was "formed of Radicals, Land Leaguers, and troublesome Clericals!"

MacLean, with the Dukes consent, stepped down before the elections in 1892 after complaining his presence was a waste of time as he was supported by no other members, and there was little prospect of additional representatives for the estate being returned.

== Council results ==
1890 Sutherland County Council election
Party	Seats	Gains	Losses	Net gain/loss	Seats %	Votes %	Votes	+/−
Highland Land League	17							
Sutherland Estate	1							
Conservative	1							

In addition to the elected members the council also included Bailie Gunn, representing the burgh of Dornoch. The ex-officio members were the Duke of Sutherland, Lord Stafford, Sheriff Mackenzie, and a Mr Barclay of Skelbo.

== Ward results ==
=== Assynt East ===
Assynt East
Party	Candidate	Votes	%	±%
Land League	Rev Norman N. Mackay	35		
Sutherland Estate	James Gordon (sub-factor)	26		

=== Assynt West ===
Assynt West
Party	Candidate	Votes	%	±%
Land League	Alex Bannerman (crofter)	124		
	Kenneth P. Mackenzie (grocer)	65		

=== Clyne ===
Clyne
Party	Candidate	Votes	%	±%
Land League	Rev. John Murray	unopposed	unopposed	

=== Dornoch East ===
Dornoch East
Party	Candidate	Votes	%	±%
Tory	James Macintosh (farmer)	59		
Land League	James Matheson (crofter)	46		

=== Dornoch West ===
Dornoch West
Party	Candidate	Votes	%	±%
	William Macleay	75		
	Alexander Grant (farmer)	31		

=== Durness ===
Durness
Party	Candidate	Votes	%	±%
Land League	Rev. Adam Gunn	unopposed	unopposed	

=== Eddrachillis ===
Eddrachillis
Party	Candidate	Votes	%	±%
Land League	Donald Macleay (merchant)	114	65.52	
Sutherland Estate	Evander McIver (factor)	60	34.48	

=== Farr ===
Farr
Party	Candidate	Votes	%	±%
Land League	George Mackay (crofter)	99	70.21	
Sutherland Estate	John Box (factor)	42	29.79	

=== Golspie East ===
Golspie East
Party	Candidate	Votes	%	±%
Sutherland Estate	Donald MacLean (factor)			

=== Golspie West ===
Golspie West
Party	Candidate	Votes	%	±%
	Alexander Macrae (tailor)	34		
	Andrew Lindsay (merchant)	30		
	Alexander Cameron	27		

=== Kildonan West ===
Kildonan West
Party	Candidate	Votes	%	±%
	John Fraser (druggist)	72		
	James John Hill (banker)	71		

=== Kildonan South ===
Kildonan South
Party	Candidate	Votes	%	±%
	Alexander Gunn (crofter)	63		
	Hugh Macleod (crofter)	40		
	James D. Fraser (hotelkeeper)	2		

=== Loth ===
Loth
Party	Candidate	Votes	%	±%
Land League	Alexander Ross	unopposed	unopposed	

=== Reay ===
Reay
Party	Candidate	Votes	%	±%
	George Mackenzie (crofter)	92		
	David Sinclair (merchant and farmer)	78		
