= Foindle =

Coordinates: 58.38740°N 5.09795°W

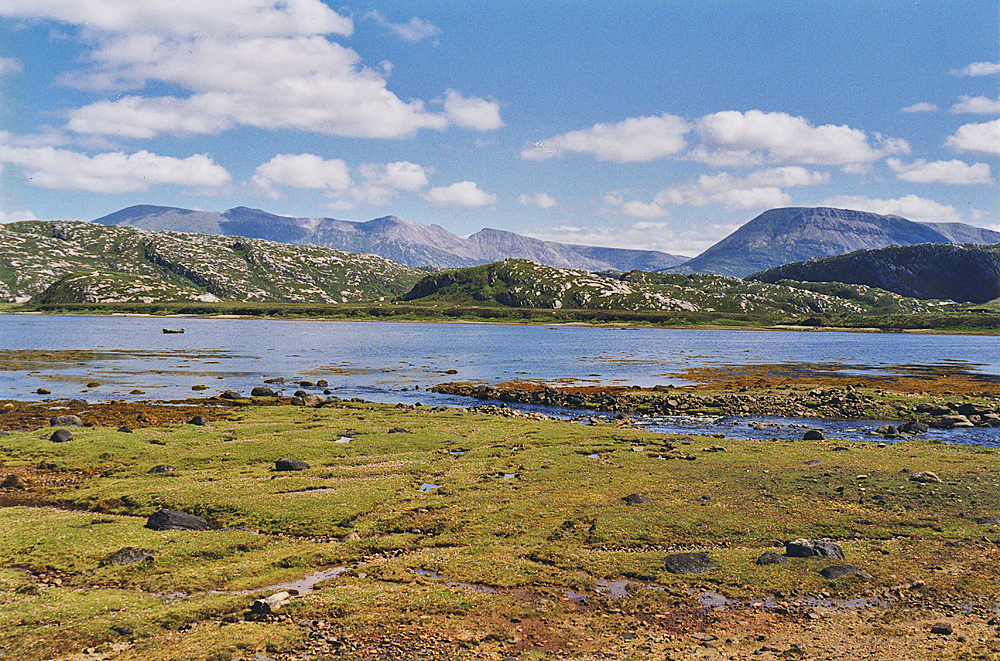
- Traigh Bad na Baighe The bay at close to high water. Foinaven and Arkle can be seen in the distance.

- Location within the Sutherland area
- OS grid reference: NC189493
- Council area: Highland
- Lieutenancy area: Sutherland
- Country: Scotland
- Sovereign state: United Kingdom
- Postcode district: IV27 4
- Police: Scotland
- Fire: Scottish
- Ambulance: Scottish

Foindle (Scottish Gaelic: An Fhionndail) is a village on the south shore of Loch Laxford in Lairg, Sutherland, Scottish Highlands and is in the Scottish council area of Highland.

The village of Fanagmore is located 0.5 miles to the west, and sit in the same cove.
