= Loch More =

- Loch Mòr
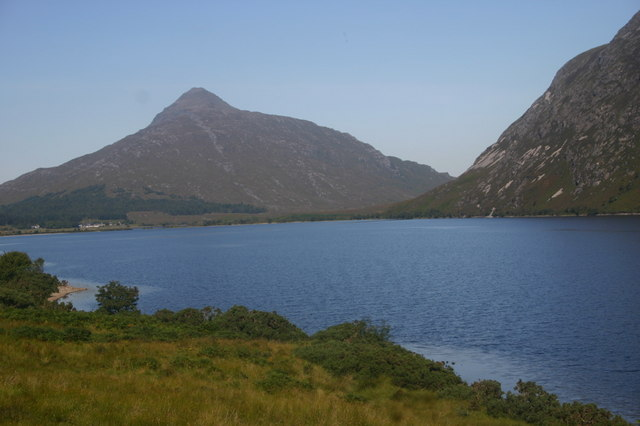

- Location within Sutherland
- Location: Sutherland, Scotland
- Coordinates: 58°17′27″N 4°51′32″W
- Type: loch
- Primary outflows: An Earachd
- Catchment area: 12 mi^{2} (31 km^{2})
- Basin countries: Scotland
- Max. length: 4 mi (6.4 km)
- Max. width: 0.35 mi (0.56 km)
- Surface area: 940 acres (1.47 mi^{2}; 3.8 km^{2})
- Average depth: 127 ft (39 m)
- Max. depth: 316 ft (96 m)
- Water volume: five billion cu ft (0.034 cu mi; 140,000,000 m^{3})
- Surface elevation: 127 ft (39 m)

Loch More (Scottish Gaelic: Loch Mòr, lit. 'great loch') is a 4 miles (6.4 km) long freshwater loch in Sutherland, Scotland, about 10 miles (16 kilometres) east of Scourie. It is part of a series of inter-connecting lochs and rivers that empty into Loch Laxford (Loch Lusart), which is a sea loch, the "ford" in the name meaning a firth not a ford This drainage area, named the Laxford basin, lies in the southern part of the civil parish of Eddrachillis (community council Scourie).

The loch has a north-west to south-east orientation and is about 127 ft (39 m) above sea level. At the south-east end, it is close to the watershed between the west and east coast of Scotland, being about 2 miles from Loch Merkland (Loch na Mairge) which drains into the Loch Shin (Loch Sin) basin and thence into the Moray Firth. At the north-west end, there is a connecting loch, named Loch nan Ealachan (Loch of the Swans) or (prior to c.1910) Loch na h-Ealaidh (Swan Loch). The width of Loch More is remarkably uniform, just under half a mile. Its surface area is 940 acres (1.47 mi^{2}; 3.8 km^{2}) and its catchment area is about 12 mi^{2} (31 km^{2}), just over a quarter of the Laxford basin drainage area, which is about 44 sq mi (110 km^{2}).

The average depth is about 126 ft (38 m) reaching a maximum of about 316 ft (96 m) in the centre and the volume of water has been estimated at five billion cu ft (0.034 cu mi; 140,000,000 m^{3}).

Loch nan Ealachan is a shallow basin up to 8 ft (2.4 m) deep joined to the main loch by a strait about 1 foot (0.30 m) deep, called Ùidh Dhubh (black ford). This is traversed by a path with stepping stones. The volume of water has been estimated at thirteen million cu ft (370,000 m^{3}).

Loch More and the Laxford drainage basin

The outflow from Loch More (together with Loch nan Ealachan) is carried by the small river An Earachd, from the north end of Loch nan Ealachan into Loch Stack (Loch Stac), which is about 1 mile (1.6 km) north of Loch More. Ben Stack (2,364 ft (721 m)), which rises steeply from the south side of Loch Stack, extends with a lesser incline as far as the hamlet of Achfary ( 154 ft (47 m)), by the shore of Loch nan Ealachan. The outflow from Loch Stack is the River Laxford, which reaches the sea at Loch Laxford.

There is no village adjacent to the loch apart from the hamlet of Achfary, alongside Loch nan Ealachan.
