= Cranstackie =

Mountain in Highland, Scotland

Coordinates: 58.45738°N 4.82973°W

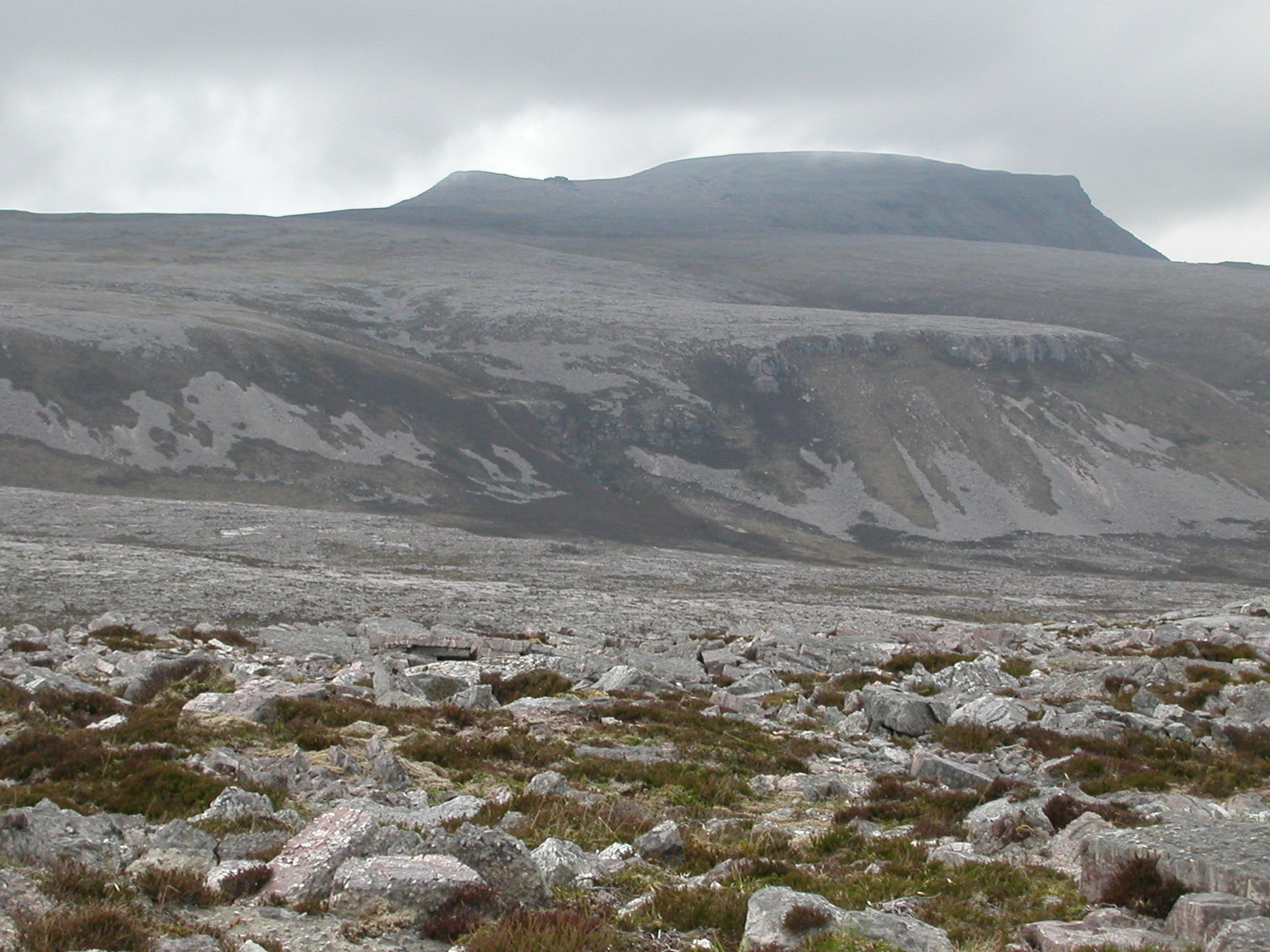
- Cranstackie from the east.

Highest point
- Elevation: 801 m (2,628 ft)
- Prominence: 560 m (1,840 ft)
- Listing: Corbett, Marilyn

Naming
- Language of name: Norse

Geography
- Location: Assynt, Scotland
- OS grid: NC350556
- Topo map: OS Landranger 9

Cranstackie is a mountain of 801 metres (2,628 ft) in Sutherland, the northwestern tip of the Scottish Highlands. It is a Corbett located west of Loch Eriboll and northeast of Foinaven. Like its lesser Corbett neighbour Beinn Spionnaidh to the northeast, its summit ridge is covered with massive blockfields and blockpiles of Cambrian sandstone, in fact quartz-arenite which is less sharp and loose than the pure white quartzite found further south. The two hills present a steep escarpment to the west, from where the usual way ascends through an easy gap, with a dip slope to the east. Below the summit ridges, Lewisian gneiss basement supports grassy and mossy slopes offering better going. On the first OS maps, the hill was named Crann Stachach, suggested to mean peaky or uneven hill of the tree but "crann" is more likely a horizontal "beam" here; the tor-stippled skyline is notable from the main road to the west. The name was anglicised on subsequent maps and stated to be of obscure meaning, supposedly Norse – "stac" is indeed a sharp hillock.
