= List of listed buildings in Eddrachillis, Highland =

This is a list of listed buildings in the parish of Eddrachillis in Highland, Scotland.

== List ==
Name	Location	Date Listed	Grid Ref. (Note: Sometimes known as OSGB36, the grid reference (where provided) is based on the British national grid reference system used by the Ordnance Survey. • "Guide to National Grid". Ordnance Survey. • "Get-a-map". Ordnance Survey.)	Geo-coordinates	Notes	LB Number (Note: Historic Environment Scotland assign a unique alphanumeric identifier to each designated site in Scotland, for listed buildings this always begins with "LB", for example "LB12345".)	Image
Laxford Bridge Over River Laxford				58°22′29″N 5°01′00″W	Category B	446	Upload Photo
Kinlochbervie Former Parliamentary Parish Manse				58°27′34″N 5°03′12″W	Category C(S)	448	Upload Photo
Eddrachillis Fishing Station				58°19′26″N 5°08′11″W	Category B	445	Upload Photo
Scourie, House Next To Post Office (At Sw Gable)				58°20′59″N 5°09′02″W	Category B	455	Upload Photo
Scourie House, Fishing Stores And Walled Garden				58°21′17″N 5°09′13″W	Category B	451	Upload Photo
Scourie Village, The Shieling				58°21′03″N 5°09′01″W	Category B	453	Upload Photo
Kinlochbervie Free Presbyterian Church				58°27′33″N 5°03′06″W	Category B	447	Upload another image
144, Oldshore More				58°28′46″N 5°04′17″W	Category C(S)	449	Upload Photo
Eddrachillis Hotel				58°19′40″N 5°08′13″W	Category C(S)	444	Upload Photo
Scourie Village, Rangoon				58°21′03″N 5°09′03″W	Category C(S)	454	Upload Photo
Achriesgill Bridge Over Achriesgill Water				58°26′24″N 4°59′21″W	Category B	485	Upload Photo
Rhiconich Bridge Over River Rhiconich				58°25′22″N 4°59′26″W	Category B	450	Upload Photo
Scourie House Steading And Former Mill				58°21′18″N 5°09′02″W	Category C(S)	452	Upload Photo

== Key ==
The scheme for classifying buildings in Scotland is:

- Category A: "buildings of national or international importance, either architectural or historic; or fine, little-altered examples of some particular period, style or building type."
- Category B: "buildings of regional or more than local importance; or major examples of some particular period, style or building type, which may have been altered."
- Category C: "buildings of local importance; lesser examples of any period, style, or building type, as originally constructed or moderately altered; and simple traditional buildings which group well with other listed buildings."

In March 2016 there were 47,288 listed buildings in Scotland. Of these, 8% were Category A, and 50% were Category B, with the remaining 42% being Category C.

== See also ==
- List of listed buildings in Highland
