= Beinn Spionnaidh =

Mountain in Highland, Scotland

Coordinates: 58.473042°N 4.810504°W

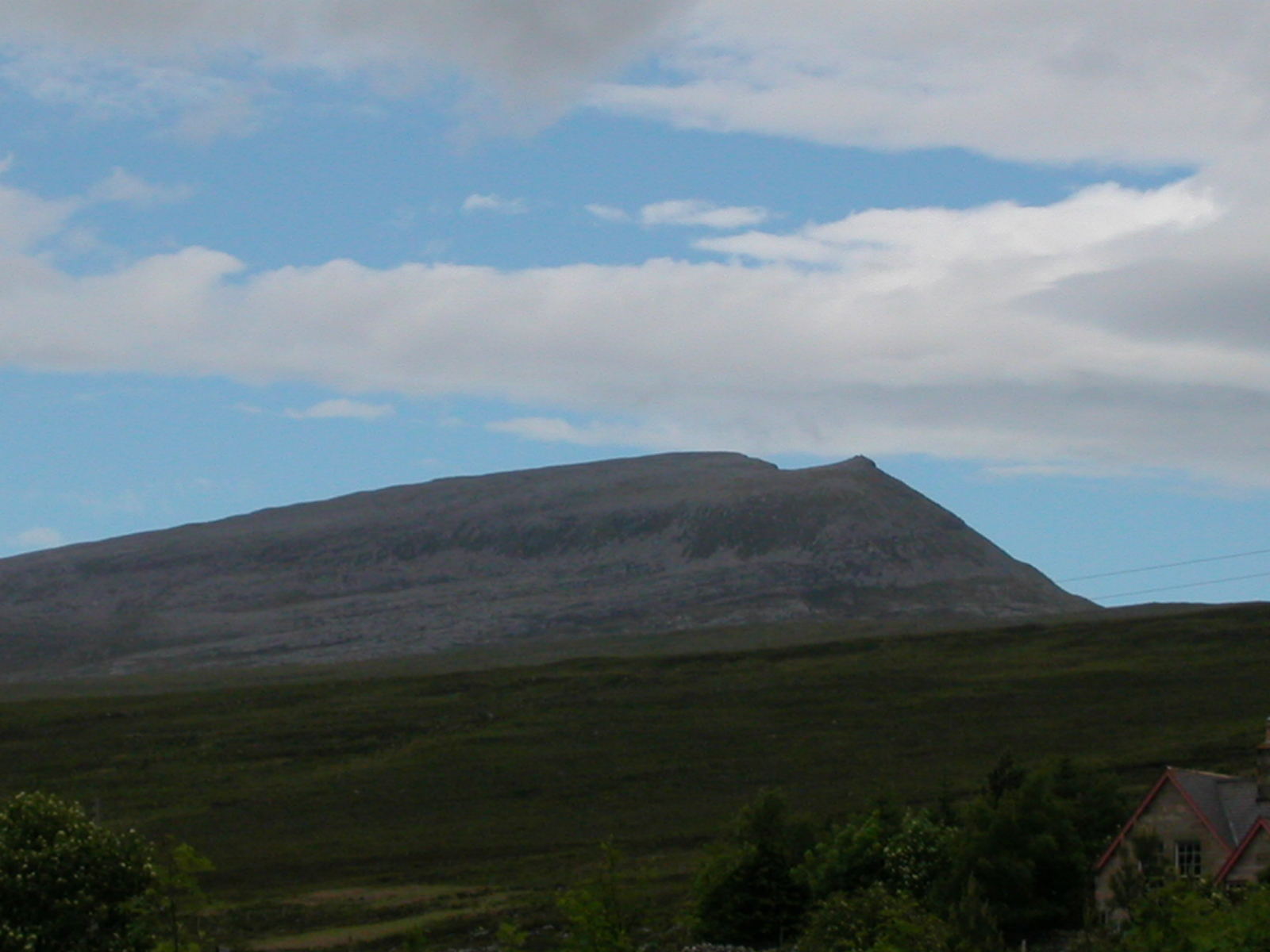

Highest point
- Elevation: 773 m (2,536 ft)
- Prominence: 211 m (692 ft)
- Listing: Corbett, Marilyn

Naming
- Language of name: Norse

Geography
- Location: Assynt, Scotland
- Topo map: OS Landranger 9

Beinn Spionnaidh is a mountain of 773m in Sutherland at the northwestern tip of the Scottish Highlands, making it the most northerly mountain in Scotland and Great Britain. It is a Corbett located west of Loch Eriboll and northeast of Cranstackie and Foinaven. It is like its neighbours in that the top, a 1 km long whaleback running southwest to northeast, is covered with loose, broken quartzite. A steep spur to the northwest, Cioch Mhor, provides one route to the top, and good views of the Kyle of Durness; the gentler slope to the southeast is tiring due to the loose rock on the upper section.
