= Loch Merkland =

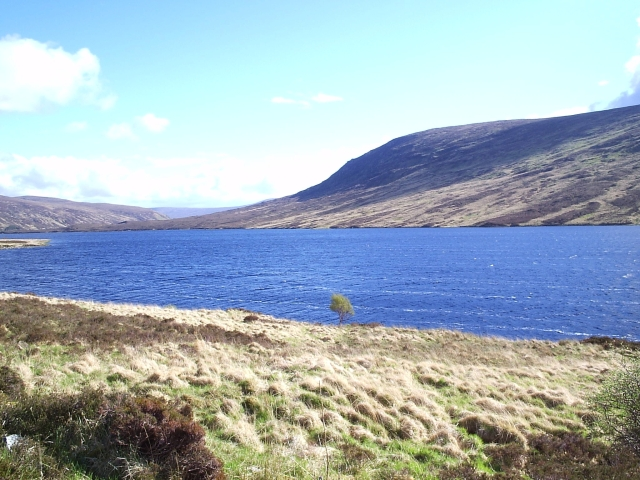

- Location in Scotland
- Location: Sutherland, Northern Scotland
- Coordinates: 58°14′N 4°45′W
- Type: Inland loch
- Primary inflows: Rivers and streams from nearby mountains
- Primary outflows: Merkland River
- Basin countries: United Kingdom
- Max. length: 2.9 miles (4.7 km)
- Surface area: 1.75 km² (430 acres)
- Shore length^{1}: Merkland Lodge and Merkland Cottage
- Surface elevation: 108.8 m (357 ft)
- ^{1} Shore length is not a well-defined measure.

Loch Merkland is a large long inland loch in Sutherland, Northern Scotland. It is located adjacent to the A838 main road which provides almost all access to the Loch and the Merkland Lodge to the south of it. There are many trails and hiking paths in the area, as per usual in the highlands of Scotland. On the Banks just above the Lodge there's also Merkland Cottage meaning there are residents around the Loch.

== Geography ==
Loch Merkland is on the A838 13.5 miles south of Laxford Bridge and more than 20 miles north of Lairg. Loch Merkland is in a very mountainous region with peaks on all sides and the Lake and its main inflow and outflow being located in a large valley between the mountains. Nearby Peaks include Creag Nan Suibheag, Meallan Liath Beag and Meallan Liath Mòr. Smaller peaks which do not classify as mountains are also in the area and each of these larger ones all have rivers and streams which directly flow into Loch Merkland. Southbound, flowing out of Loch Merkland is the Merkland river which flows into Loch a' Ghriama which is directly linked to Loch Shin. The Loch is Located at an elevation of 108.8 metres above sea level.

== Archeology ==
A site where an ancient furnace was dug up was situated very near to Loch Merkland, and much questioning had arisen about where and when it was made. Inquires to Locals and further research proved unsuccessful.

== Tourism ==
The Merkland Lodge provides a small tourism industry for the area as it is a location where people can stay while either using the lake itself or hiking the mountains around it.
