= Laxford =

Location in northwest Scotland

Coordinates: 58°22′29″N 5°01′01″W

Location of Laxford Bridge in Sutherland

Laxford is a remote area in the far Northwest Highlands of Scotland around the River Laxford which runs northwest from Loch Stack to Laxford Bay. This bay is an inlet of Loch Laxford, a sea loch and a Special Area of Conservation. The river is well known for its salmon fly fishing, indeed the name "Laxford" derives from the Norse for "salmon fjord". The area is important geologically, being a region of shear in the Moine Thrust. A road bridge, Laxford Bridge, crosses the river adjacent to the A838 and A894 roads, the road junction making the spot well known to tourists. Laxford is in Sutherland, in the Highland council area of Scotland; Scourie, 12 kilometres (7.5 miles) away, is the nearest village. The area forms part of the North West Sutherland National Scenic Area, one of 40 such areas in Scotland, which are defined so as to identify areas of exceptional scenery and to ensure its protection by restricting certain forms of development.

== River Laxford ==
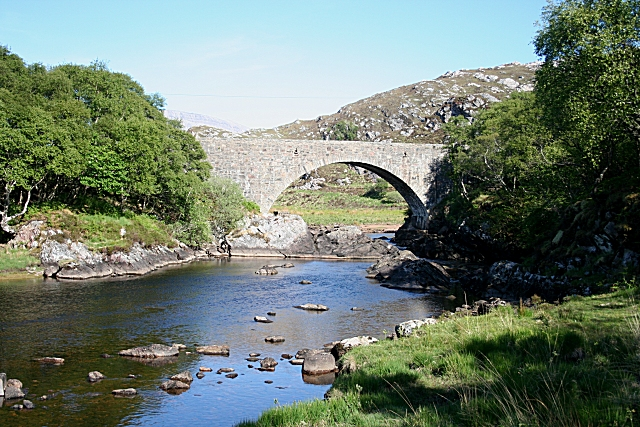
Laxford Bridge crossing the River

The River Laxford runs some 7 kilometres (4.3 mi) in a generally northwesterly direction from Loch Stack (by Ben Stack) to Laxford Bay. It has a catchment area of about 170 square kilometres (67 sq mi). The River Laxford is considered one of the more productive salmon rivers in northern Scotland with a catch of over 200 salmon in most seasons. Catches of sea trout, however, have declined in recent years.

== Loch Laxford ==
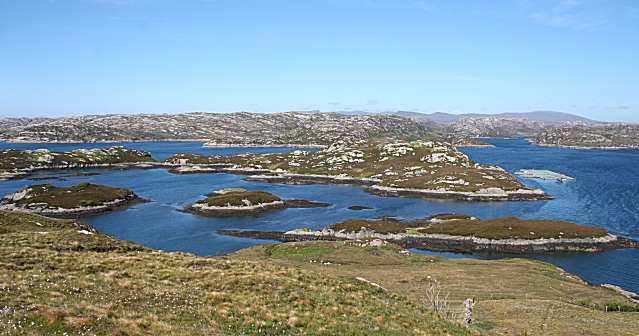
Islands in Loch Laxford – the main one shown is Eilean a' Mhadaidh

Laxford Bay is an inlet of Loch Laxford, a fjard sea loch. The loch is a Special Area of Conservation, classified as a large shallow inlet and bay – it has a wide variety of marine habitats and species. Water conditions are mostly sheltered because of the reefs and islands but the outer region of the loch is very exposed. It has the most extensive shoreline of sheltered sediment in the far northwest of Scotland. There are many small islands in the loch.

== Geology ==
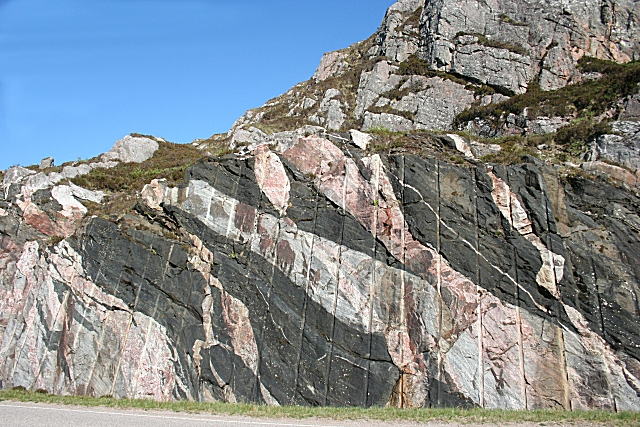
New A838 road cutting showing grey felsic gneiss, intruded with black gneiss, then intruded with pink granite and later deformed in the Laxfordian event

Laxford is in the region of the Lewisian gneiss complex, deformed by the Moine Thrust, which occurred during the Caledonian Orogeny. To the south are Scourian high-grade metamorphic rocks, some 3,000 million years old, intruded with undeformed Scourie dykes 2,400 million years ago whereas to the north are lower-grade metamorphic rocks, which were later deformed and metamorphosed during the Laxfordian orogeny. At Laxford, layers of pink granite and pegmatite intruded into hot gneiss about 1,750 million years ago. Alternating layers of black mafic gneiss and grey felsic gneiss are to be seen, cut across by steeply dipping sheets of granite and pegmatite.

This area has been studied for over 100 years. First recognised by Peach et al. (1907), the area is made up of predominantly gneiss. F. Davies released a series of articles about the area in the 1970s, particularly in relation to the Scouie dyke swarms that cross cut the lewisian gneiss in the region. Further work in the area has investigated the nature of the Laxford shear zone (for example, the current geologist Katherine Goodenough).

The Laxford area lies on the Laxfordian Shear Zone, which defines the boundary between the central region and the northern region of the lewisian gneiss. This is one of the few areas what has experienced all three metamorphic events of the lewisian gneiss: the Badcallian (2.8-2.7Ga), the Inverian (2.6-2.5Ga) and the Laxfordian (1.8-1.3Ga) however some academics argue that the Laxfordian spans as recent as 1.0Ga. Each metamorphism event has, to an extent, overprinted the next. Thermobarometry has been used to attempt to identify the peak temperatures and pressures of each metamorphic event.

== Laxford Bridge ==
At Laxford Bridge the A838 road, coming northwest from Lairg on Scotland's northeast coast, joins the A894 coming from Loch Assynt, which is to the south. The A838 then crosses the river at the bridge and runs northeast to Durness on Scotland's north coast.
