= A838 road =

Road in Sutherland, in the Highland area of Scotland

A838

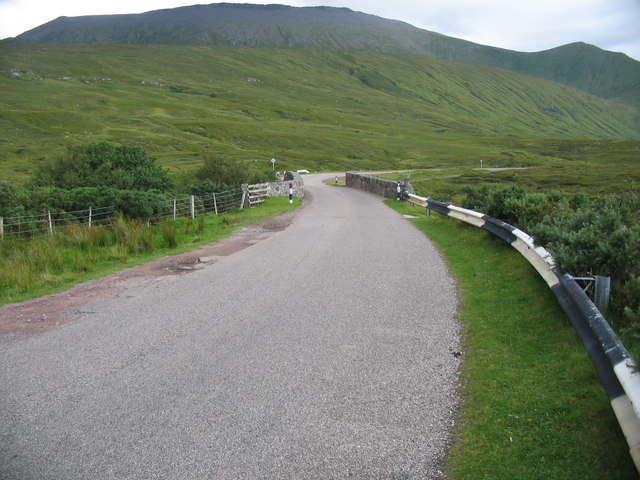
- The A838 crossing the River Dionard

Route information
- Length: 84 mi (135 km)

Major junctions
- south end: Lairg; 58.0556°N 4.4193°W
- A836 A894 A836
- north end: Tongue; 58.4864°N 4.4134°W

Location
- Country: United Kingdom
- Constituent country: Scotland

Road network
- Roads in the United Kingdom; Motorways; A and B road zones

The A838 is a major road in Sutherland, in the Highland area of Scotland. It runs generally northwest from the A836 in the Lairg area to Laxford Bridge on the west coast of Scotland, then generally northeast to Durness on the north coast, and then generally east/southeast to Tongue, where it rejoins the A836. The A836 takes a more direct route from Lairg to Tongue.

The A838 has a junction with two other classified roads, the A894 at Laxford Bridge, and the B801 at Rhiconich.

Between Lairg and Laxford Bridge the road runs close to five lochs: Loch Shin, Loch a' Ghriama, Loch Merkland, Loch More and Loch Stack as well as the coastal inlet of the Kyle of Durness. Between Durness and Tongue the road loops south to skirt Loch Eriboll, and the Kyle of Tongue Bridge and causeway cross the Kyle of Tongue.
