= Eddrachillis =

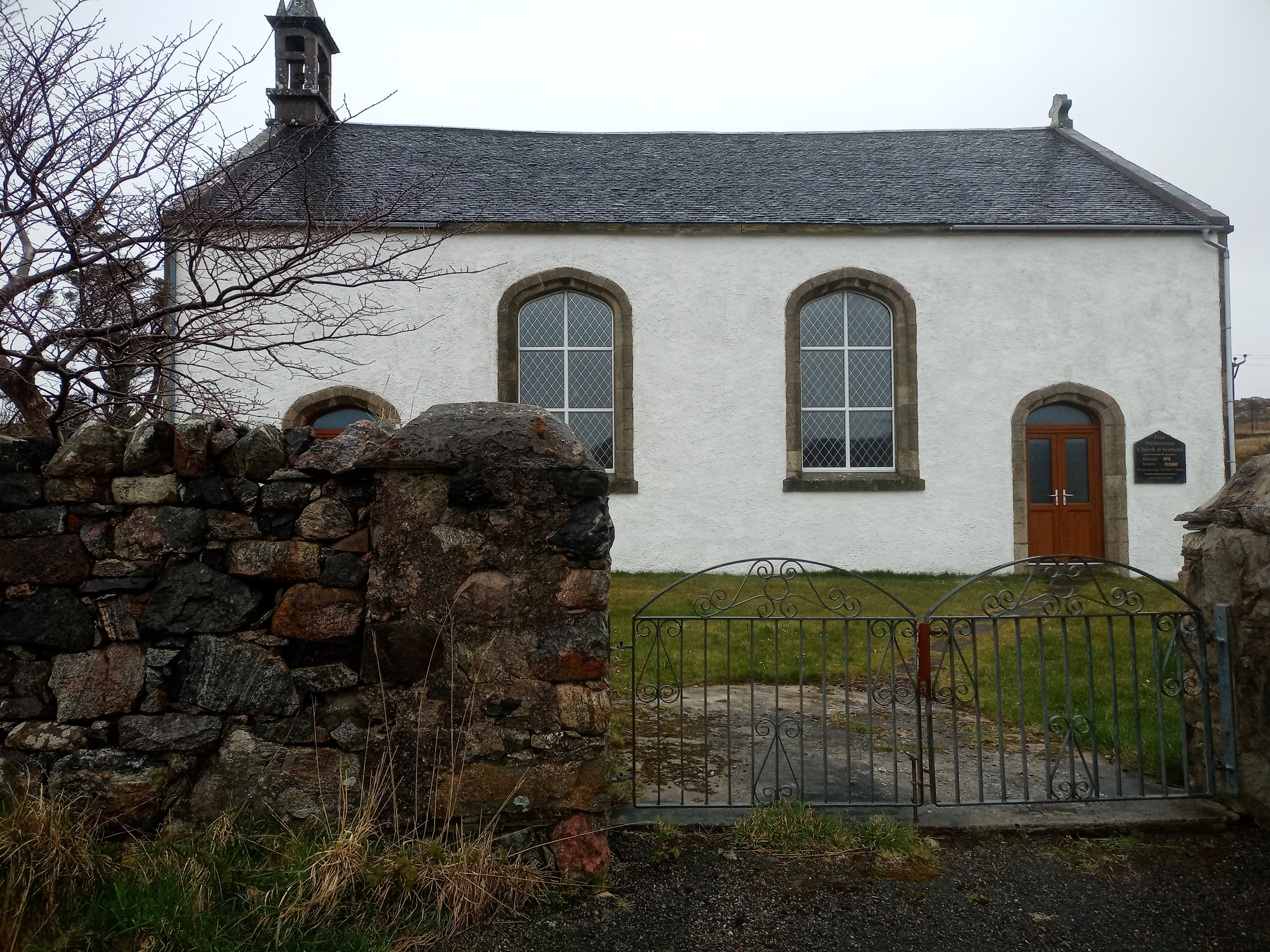
- Kinlochbervie church
- Population: 688 (2011)
- OS grid reference: NC220563
- Civil parish: Eddrachillis
- Council area: Highland
- Lieutenancy area: Sutherland
- Country: Scotland
- Sovereign state: United Kingdom
- Post town: LAIRG
- Police: Scotland
- Fire: Scottish
- Ambulance: Scottish
- UK Parliament: Caithness, Sutherland and Easter Ross
- Scottish Parliament: Caithness, Sutherland and Ross

Eddrachillis is a civil parish in north-west Sutherland, Scotland. In Gaelic (Eadar dha Chaolais) it means: between two firths. For local government, it forms part of the Highland Unitary Authority.

It is about 28 miles long and encompasses the village of Scourie, port of Kinlochbervie, and the hamlets of Kylesku, Badcall, Achriesgill, Rhiconich Achfary, and Balchrick. The most prominent sea lochs are Loch a' Chàirn Bhàin (or Kyle Sku) (crossed by Kylesku Bridge, Laxford and Inchard. Inland, Loch More (the great loch) is 4 miles long, which lies south-east of Ben Stack( (2,365 ft)). The parish also includes Handa Island.

At the 2011 census, the population of the civil parish was 688. 7.6% had some knowledge of Gaelic. In 1891 84.9% were Gaelic speaking.

The area of the parish is 135,631 acres.

The parish was formed in 1724 when it was disjoined from Durness by the General Assembly at the request of Lord Reay.

The district of Kinlochbervie was erected into a separate ‘’quoad sacra’’ (ecclesiastical only) parish by the Church Building (Scotland) Act 1824 (5 Geo. 4. c. 90) but in 1856 it also became a separate Registration District, while the remainder of the parish formed the Registration District of Scourie.

This division continues in the scheme for community councils, there being one for Scourie and another for Kinlochbervie.
