= Loch Stack =

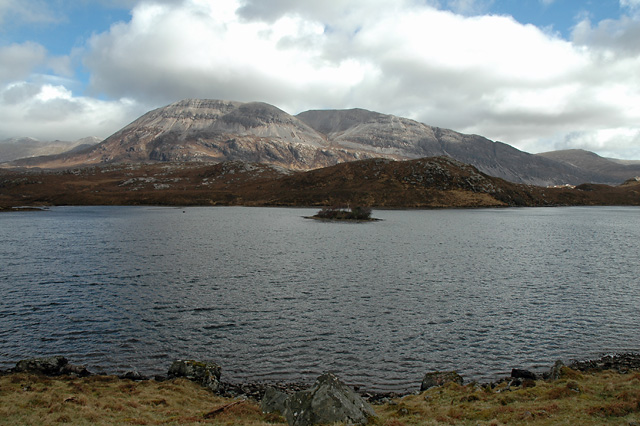
- Loch Stack

- Location within Sutherland
- Location: Sutherland, Scotland
- Coordinates: 58.336700°N 4.924500°W
- Type: Freshwater loch
- Primary inflows: An Earachd
- Primary outflows: River Laxford
- Basin countries: Scotland
- Max. length: 4 km (2.5 mi)
- Surface area: 252.1 ha (623 acres)
- Average depth: 26 m (85 ft)
- Max. depth: 33 m (108 ft)
- Water volume: 28,000,000 m^{3} (988,000,000 ft^{3})
- Shore length^{1}: 16.6 km (10.3 mi)
- Surface elevation: 46 m (151 ft)
- Islands: 1
- ^{1} Shore length is not a well-defined measure.

Loch Stack is a large, irregularly shaped freshwater loch in the Northwest of Scotland. It lies approximately four miles (six kilometres) southeast of Laxford Bridge and is surrounded by mountains. Ben Stack rises steeply from the loch's southwestern shore and Arkle lies directly to the north. The outflow from Loch More, which is about 1 mile (1.5 kilometres) south of Loch Stack, is carried (via Loch nan Ealachan) by the small river An Earachd into Loch Stack. The outflow from Loch Stack proceeds via the River Laxford, and the two are designated the Loch Stack and River Laxford Site of Special Scientific Interest (SSSI).

== Survey ==
The loch was surveyed between 6 and 8 September 1902 by T.N. Johnston and James Murray and later charted as part of the Sir John Murray's Bathymetrical Survey of Fresh-Water Lochs of Scotland 1897-1909.
