= Fanagmore =

Coordinates: 58.3974°N 5.1232°W

Fanagmore: Scottish Gaelic: An Fheannag Mhòr
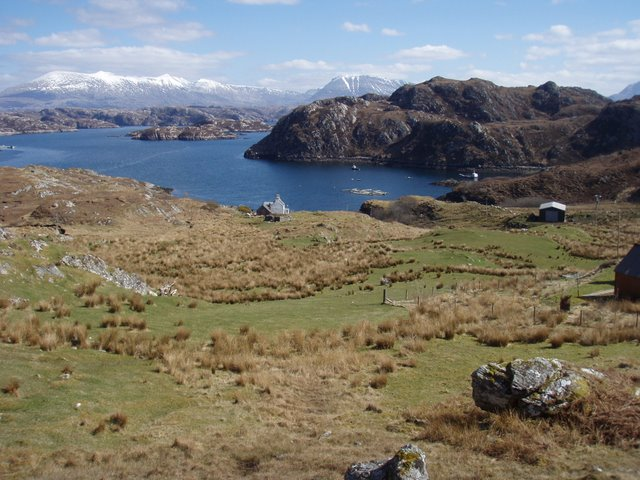
- Fanagmore Bay

- Location within the Sutherland area
- OS grid reference: NC175496
- Council area: Highland
- Lieutenancy area: Sutherland
- Country: Scotland
- Sovereign state: United Kingdom
- Postcode district: IV27 4
- Police: Scotland
- Fire: Scottish
- Ambulance: Scottish

Fanagmore (Scottish Gaelic: An Fheannag Mhòr) is a hamlet in Sutherland, Highland, in far northwestern Scotland. It lies on the south shore of Loch Laxford, an inlet of the Atlantic Ocean. Fanagmore consists of three properties, a few farm buildings, a boat launch and a small harbour. There are tourist cruises from the nearby hamlet of Tarbet to Handa Island.
