= Ben Stack =

- Beinn Stac
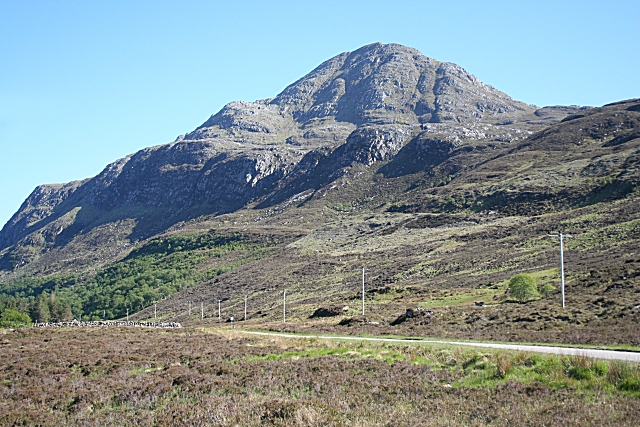
- Ben Stack

Highest point
- Elevation: 721 m (2,365 ft)
- Prominence: 532 m (1,745 ft)
- Listing: Graham, Marilyn
- Coordinates: 58°20′08″N 4°57′27″W

Naming
- English translation: Pinnacle hill
- Language of name: Scottish Gaelic
- Pronunciation: /ˌbɛn ˈstæk/

Geography
- Location within Scotland
- Location: Sutherland, Scotland
- OS grid: NC269423
- Topo map: OS Landranger 9

Climbing
- Easiest route: Walk

Ben Stack (Scottish Gaelic: Beinn Stac) is a mountain in Sutherland, in the northwest of Scotland. It is 721 m (2,365 ft) high. It lies southeast of Laxford Bridge and northwest of Loch More along the A838 road, and just west of Loch Stack.

It is regarded as a moderately easy walk for walkers and hikers due to its overall height and its accessibility from the A838 road. It is most commonly climbed from the southeast, following the long eastern ridge of Leathad na Stioma. A slightly steeper alternative comes from the northwestern side, starting from near Lochstack Lodge. These starting points are both located on the A838 road, thus a traverse is possible.

On 6 August 2005 former U.K. Foreign Secretary Robin Cook died after collapsing with a heart attack whilst walking down from the summit.

== See also ==
Foinaven

== Picture gallery ==
Click on image to view full size

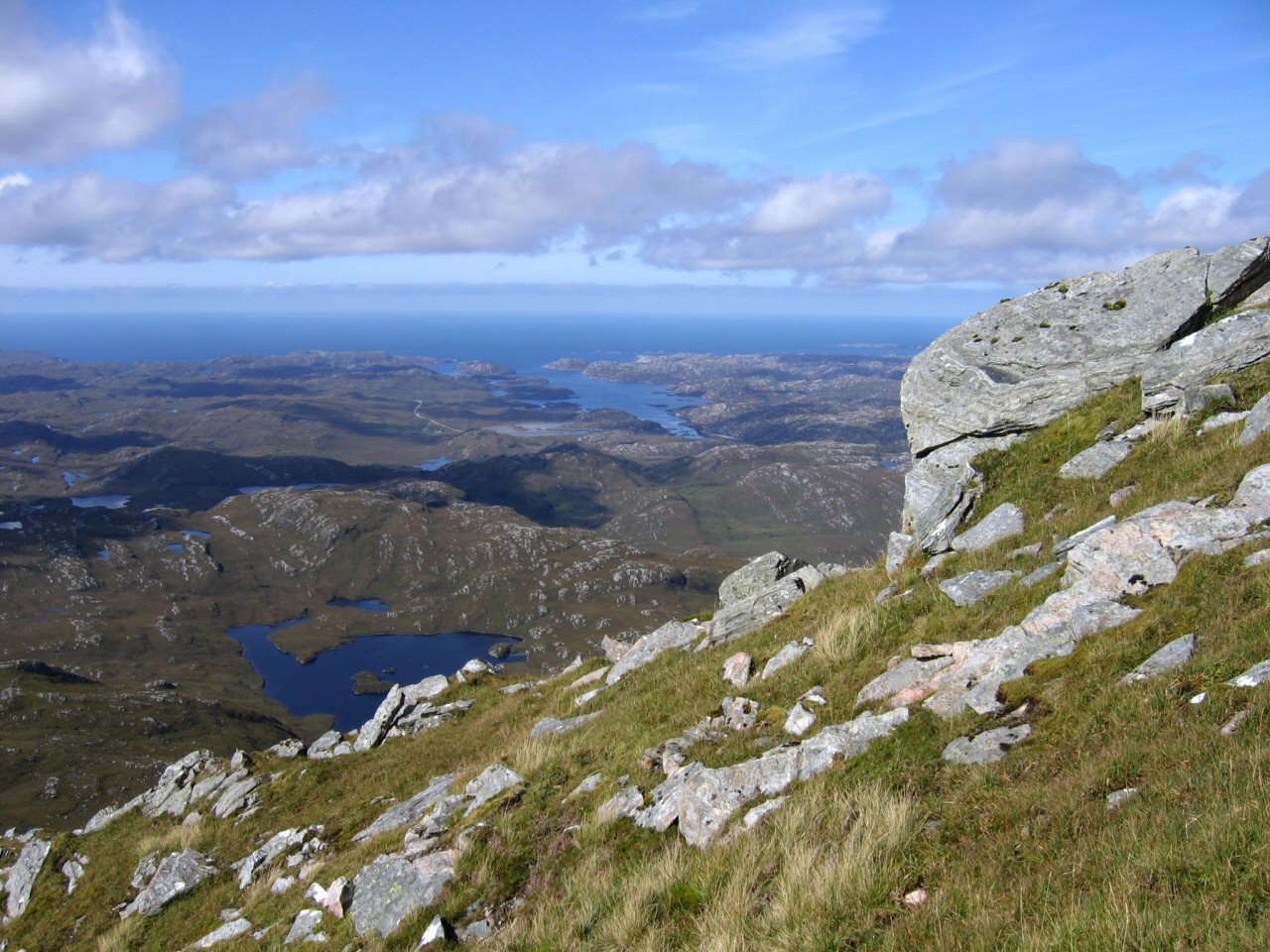
Looking west from Ben Stack

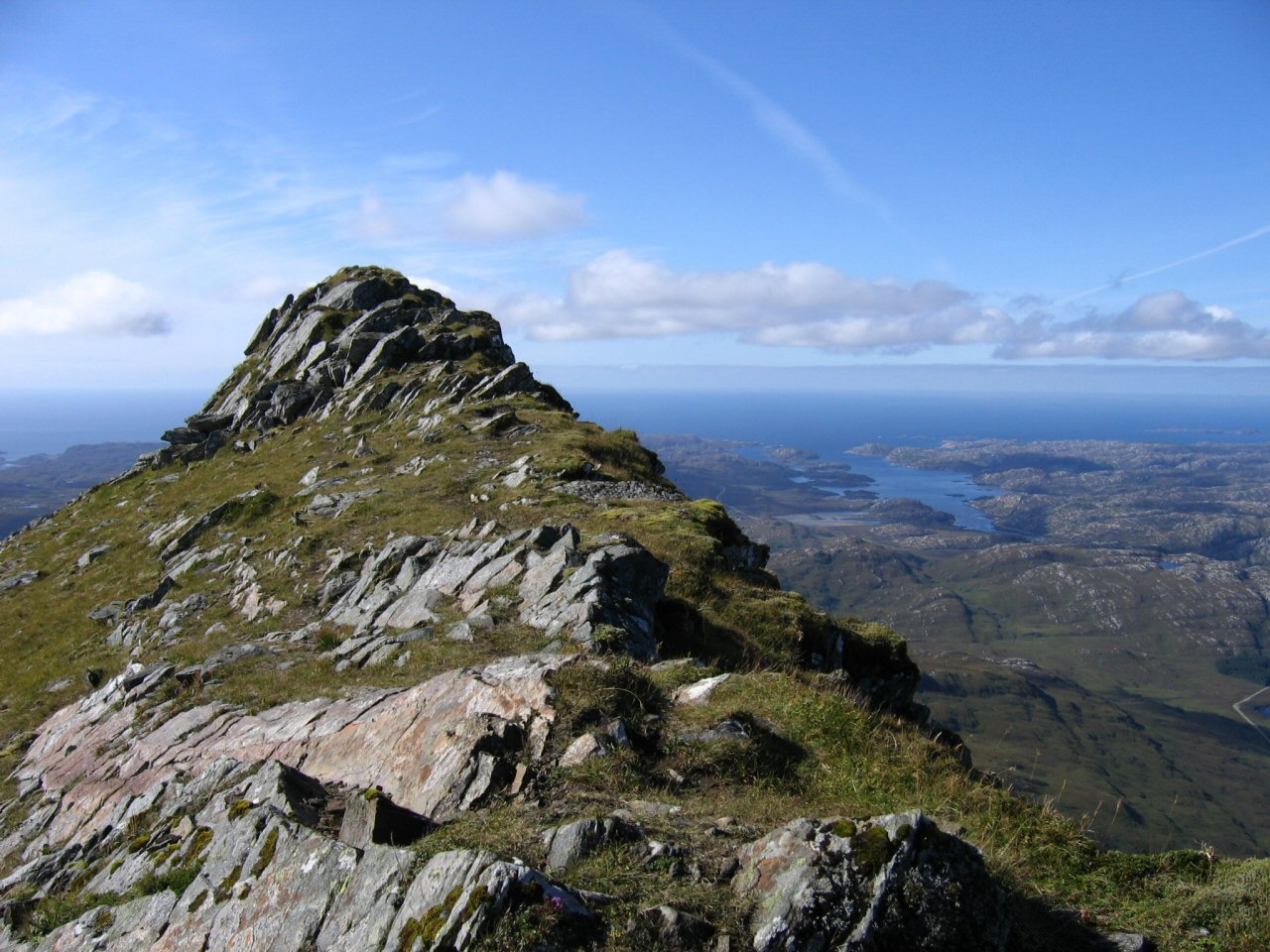
The Ben Stack summit ridge

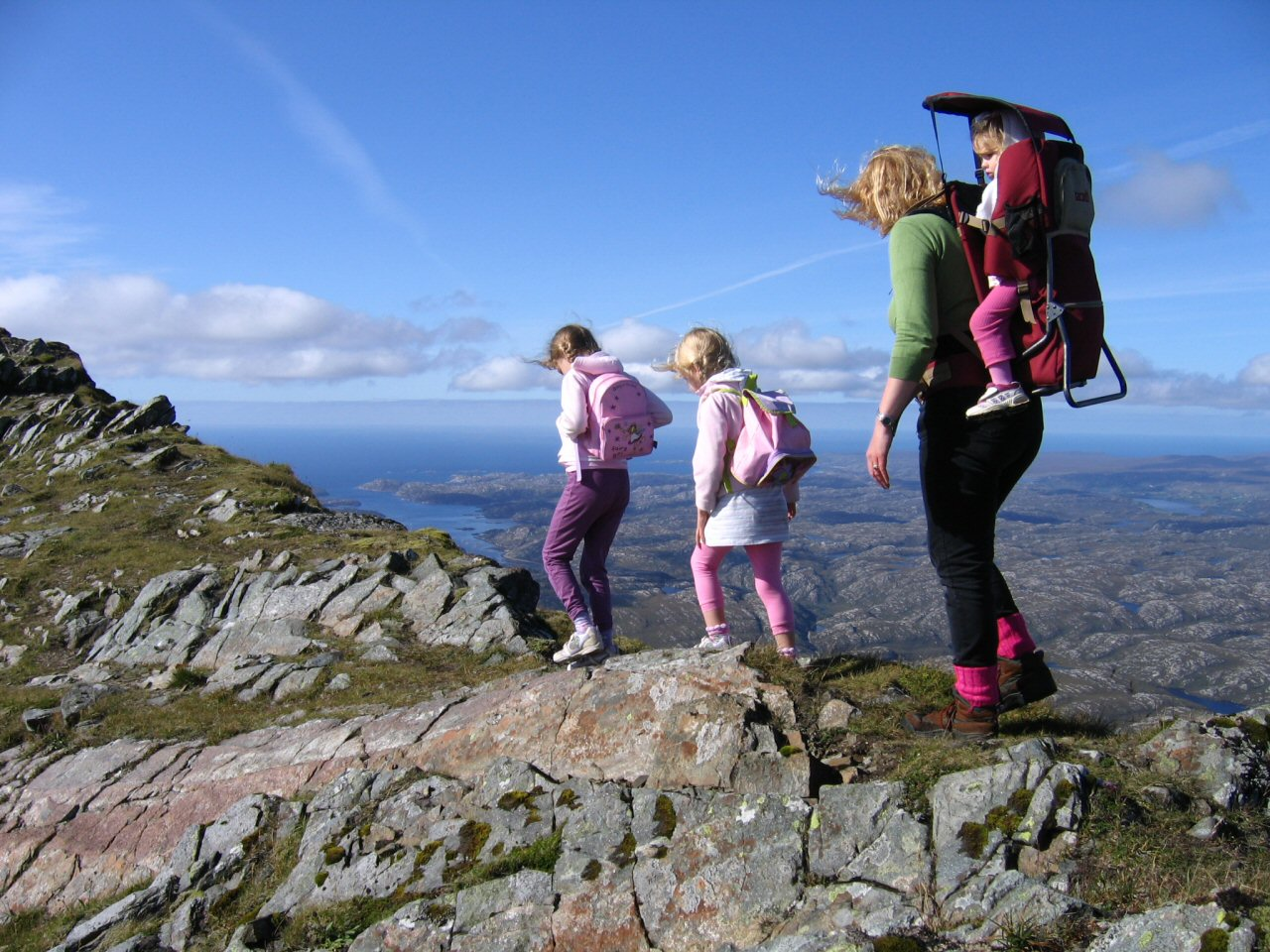
Walking on Ben Stack
