= Achfary =

Hamlet in Sutherland, Scotland

Coordinates: 58.312°N 4.916°W

Achfary: Scottish Gaelic: Achadh Taigh Phairidh
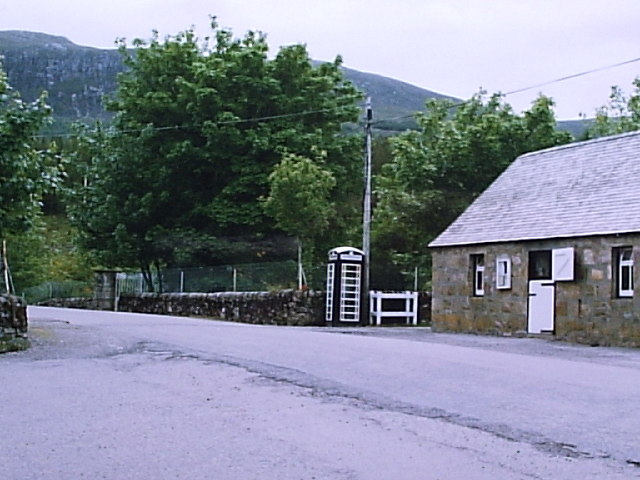
- Achfary village and its black telephone box

- Location within the Sutherland area
- Council area: Highland
- Country: Scotland
- Sovereign state: United Kingdom
- Police: Scotland
- Fire: Scottish
- Ambulance: Scottish

Achfary (Scottish Gaelic: Achadh Taigh Phairidh) is a hamlet in the Scottish council area of Highland. To the east of the village lies Loch nan Ealachan.

It is owned by the Grosvenor Estate (the Duke of Westminster) and is renowned for its unusual black and white telephone box, erected in the 1960s. In response to a campaign by the Duke to keep the box in place, a spokesman for BT said in October 2008 that it had been "used for three chargeable calls last year and 29 in all. The other 26 were free." Despite this, it remains one of the least-known villages in Scotland.

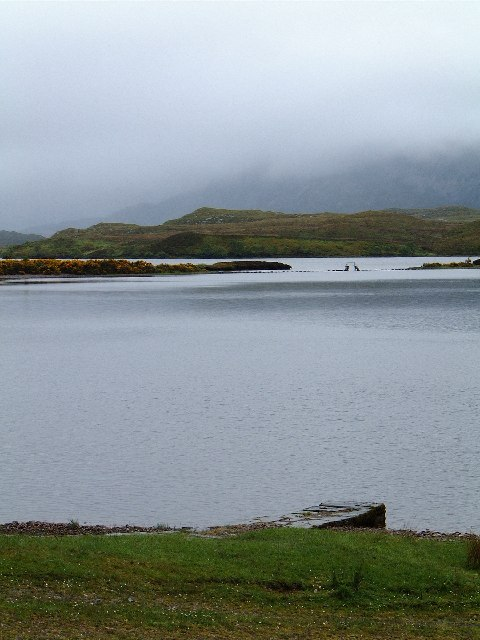
Loch nan Ealachan

Achfary post office opened on 1 September 1956, and is still open to this day.

The Reay Forest Estate's offices were, until recently, located in part of the house closest to the village hall; now it is housed in the top floor of the newly erected Steading Building, a two-storey office and workshed arrangement with its design based on the farmhouse previously occupying that spot. The front of the building contains a plaque that was first housed in a church, which was later closed and the plaque moved to the farmhouse. Following the demolition of the farmhouse, which, at that time, was used as a workshop of sorts, it was decided that the Steading Building should contain this plaque as well.

Achfary's village hall, commonly used for functions, also houses its school, Achfary Primary. The school, while not the smallest in the area, is among the smallest in Britain, with only eight pupils as of May 2009. Two of these were scheduled to leave in the summer, and a further three were transfers from neighbouring Scourie Primary, a school caught in an argument between various members of its community, leading to the temporary transfer of many of its pupils to other nearby primary schools.

In 1982, the English poet J. H. Prynne sent a series of four postcards from Achfary to friend and contemporary poet Ed Dorn, who published them in his newspaper Rolling Stock under the title 'Highland Notes'. In these pieces, Prynne reads the landscape of Achfary through the lens of its historical background during the Highland Clearances, writing: 'This place is sharply desolate, empty because invisibly emptied.'

== Climate ==
On 28 December 2019, a maximum temperature of 18.7 °C was recorded by the Met Office. This is the highest temperature ever recorded in the UK during December. On 28 January 2024, a maximum temperature of 19.9 °C was recorded by the Met Office. This is the highest temperature ever recorded in the UK in January.

The highest temperature recorded at Achfary between 2006 and 2023 was 28.3 °C (82.9 °F) on 14 June 2023. The lowest was −10.2 °C (13.6 °F) on 23 December 2010.

Climate data for Achfary 53m amsl (extremes 2006-2024)
Month	Jan	Feb	Mar	Apr	May	Jun	Jul	Aug	Sep	Oct	Nov	Dec	Year
Record high °C (°F)	19.9 (67.8)	16.5 (61.7)	20.3 (68.5)	22.2 (72.0)	27.9 (82.2)	28.3 (82.9)	27.8 (82.0)	26.5 (79.7)	27.6 (81.7)	19.5 (67.1)	17.8 (64.0)	18.7 (65.7)	28.3 (82.9)
Mean daily maximum °C (°F)	6.8 (44.2)	6.9 (44.4)	8.3 (46.9)	10.6 (51.1)	13.5 (56.3)	15.3 (59.5)	17.0 (62.6)	16.9 (62.4)	15.1 (59.2)	12.1 (53.8)	9.0 (48.2)	6.9 (44.4)	11.5 (52.8)
Mean daily minimum °C (°F)	0.7 (33.3)	0.5 (32.9)	1.7 (35.1)	2.9 (37.2)	4.8 (40.6)	7.8 (46.0)	10.1 (50.2)	9.8 (49.6)	7.9 (46.2)	5.7 (42.3)	3.1 (37.6)	0.6 (33.1)	4.6 (40.3)
Record low °C (°F)	−10.1 (13.8)	−7.7 (18.1)	−8.0 (17.6)	−4.2 (24.4)	−1.8 (28.8)	1.2 (34.2)	2.7 (36.9)	3.2 (37.8)	0.6 (33.1)	−1.8 (28.8)	−7.5 (18.5)	−10.2 (13.6)	−10.2 (13.6)
Average precipitation mm (inches)	148 (5.8)	112 (4.4)	119 (4.7)	79 (3.1)	63 (2.5)	64 (2.5)	67 (2.6)	77 (3.0)	112 (4.4)	142 (5.6)	156 (6.1)	152 (6.0)	1,291 (50.7)
Average precipitation days	20	18	20	15	13	13	13	15	17	21	20	19	204
Mean monthly sunshine hours	34	63	94	147	199	160	129	132	104	75	42	26	1,205
Source 1: Scottish places
Source 2: Starlings Roost Weather
