= Arkle (Sutherland) =

Mountain in Sutherland, Scotland

Coordinates: 58.37033°N 4.90485°W

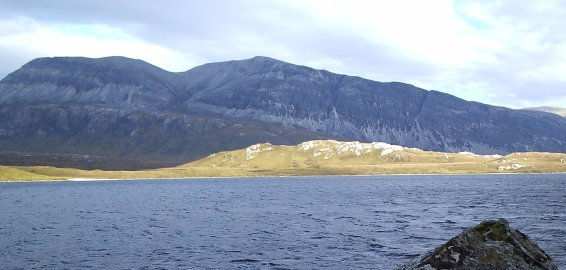
- Arkle above the shores of Loch Stac

Highest point
- Elevation: 787 m (2,582 ft)
- Prominence: 392 m (1,286 ft)
- Listing: Marilyn, Corbett

Naming
- Etymology: Norse ark-fjell, "flat-topped hill" or Scottish Gaelic airceal/airceil, "hiding-place"
- Native name: Scottish Gaelic: Arcail
- Pronunciation: English: /ˈɑːrkəl/; Gaelic: Scottish Gaelic pronunciation: [ˈaɾkəlʲ]

Geography
- Location within Sutherland
- Location: Sutherland, Scotland
- Parent range: Northwest Highlands
- OS grid: NC302461
- Topo map: OS Landranger 9

Arkle (Scottish Gaelic: Arcail or Airceil; occasionally Ben Arkle - Beinn Arcail) is a mountain in Sutherland, in the far north-west corner of the Scottish Highlands. Like its sister Foinaven, the mountain is made up of glistening white Cambrian quartzite, laid down around 530 million years ago on an uneven basement of much older Lewisian gneiss. The quartzite, and the Torridonian sandstone which makes up many of the other mountains in the area, have been dissected by rivers and glaciers, leaving a series of isolated peaks, such as Suilven, Quinag and Stac Pollaidh, standing above the "knock and lochan" landscape of small hills and lakes that is typical of the Lewisian gneiss.

'Ben Arkle' was the subject of a painting by Charles, Prince of Wales. This painting was reproduced by the British Post Office as one of a set of five stamps (SG 1810–1814, issued 1 March 1994) showing paintings by Prince Charles and also, as a commemorative label, in a stamp book (SG HB16) issued 14 November 1994 to celebrate the Prince's 50th birthday.

Arkle, the Irish thoroughbred racehorse, was named after the mountain.
