= Laxford Bridge =

Stone arch bridge in northwest Scotland

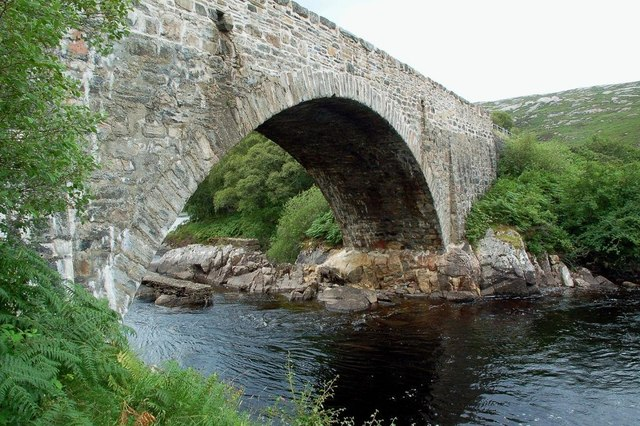
- Bridge crossing the River Laxford
- Coordinates: 58°22′29″N 05°01′01″W
- Carries: A838
- Crosses: River Laxford

Characteristics
- Material: Stone rubble

History
- Construction end: c.1834; 192 years ago

Listed Building – Category B
- Official name: Laxford Bridge Over River Laxford
- Designated: 17 March 1971
- Reference no.: LB446

Location
- Interactive map of Laxford Bridge

The Laxford Bridge is a stone arch bridge in Sutherland, Scotland which carries the A838 across the River Laxford north to Rhiconich and Durness.

The bridge was built about 1834 by the Dukes of Sutherland – the road from Lairg, one of the "destitution roads" built during the potato famine, not being completed until 1851. The bridge is a category B listed building.

An army transporter crashed on the bridge in 2009 causing so much damage that it had to be closed to traffic. Detours of at least 97 kilometres (60 miles) were required (off-road) and the additional distance by road was 160 kilometres (100 miles).

== See also ==
- List of bridges in Scotland
