= Scourie =

Coordinates: 58.3519°N 5.1512°W

Scourie: Scottish Gaelic: Sgobhairigh
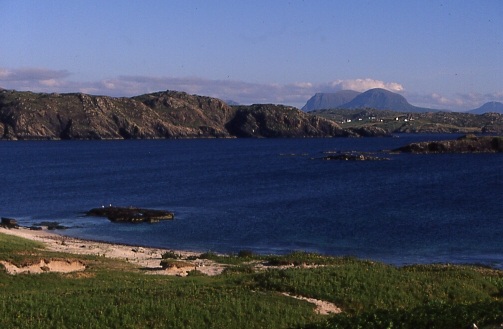
- Quinag and Scourie across the Sound of Handa

- Location within the Sutherland area
- OS grid reference: NC157447
- Community council: Eddrachillis
- Council area: Highland
- Lieutenancy area: Sutherland
- Country: Scotland
- Sovereign state: United Kingdom
- Post town: LAIRG
- Postcode district: IV27
- Dialling code: 01971
- Police: Scotland
- Fire: Scottish
- Ambulance: Scottish
- UK Parliament: Caithness, Sutherland and Easter Ross
- Scottish Parliament: Caithness, Sutherland and Ross

Scourie (/ˈskaʊri/; Scottish Gaelic: Sgobhairigh) is a village on the north-west coast of Scotland, about halfway between Ullapool and Durness. It is in the civil parish of Eddrachillis, in the traditional county of Sutherland, now part of the Highland council area; the 2011 Census classified it as "very remote rural" with an adult population of 132. The name probably comes from Old Norse skóg-erg, meaning "shieling of the wood".

Until the 19th century, Clan Mackay was the predominant family in the area, with a junior branch of the family owning Scourie itself; in 1640, it was the birthplace of Hugh Mackay, a Scottish general who commanded the forces of William III at Killiecrankie in July 1689. The last of the Mackays' Scottish estates, including Scourie, were sold in 1829, although the name is still common in the area.

The nearby island of Handa is a nature reserve and the site of a large seabird colony, including puffins, skuas, guillemots and razorbills. The Scourie estate was owned by Dr Jean Balfour, who died in 2023. The palm trees in the grounds of Scourie House next to the harbour are claimed to be the most northerly specimens in the world not grown in artificial conditions. However, this is a popular misconception. The "palms" in the grounds are actually Cordyline australis, a native New Zealand tree which is found in lowland and montane areas. In the UK it is commonly referred to as "Torbay palm" or "Cornwall palm".

Being on the popular North Coast 500 (NC500) scenic route, the village has accommodation for tourists at a hotel with 21 rooms, bed and breakfasts and a campsite. Fishing, particularly fly fishing, is popular due to the large number of freshwater lochs, which offer brown trout.

Scourie plays host to the home matches of shinty team Kinlochbervie Camanachd Club and North Caledonian Football League team Scourie F.C.
