= Foinaven =

Mountain in Scotland

Coordinates: 58.41210°N 4.88603°W

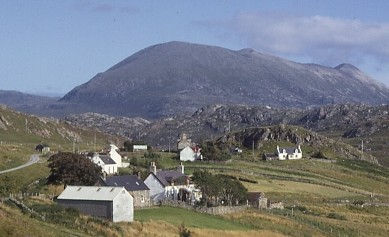
- Foinaven seen from Achriesgill on Loch Inchard

Highest point
- Elevation: 911 m (2,989 ft)
- Prominence: 690 m (2,260 ft)
- Listing: Marilyn, Corbett

Naming
- Native name: Scottish Gaelic: Foinnebheinn – Ganu Mòr
- English translation: Mountain of the warts – Big ?head
- Pronunciation: English: /ˈfɔɪnəvən/ Scottish Gaelic: [ˈfɤɲəveɲ] – [ˈkanu ˈmoːɾ]

Geography
- Location: Sutherland, Scotland
- OS grid: NC315507
- Topo map: OS Landranger 9

Foinaven (Scottish Gaelic: Foinnebheinn) is a mountain in Scotland, situated in the northwest corner of the Scottish Highlands. It has a conspicuous white cap of Cambrian quartzite which overlies the ancient Lewisian gneiss basement. This relatively thin quartzite sheet is resistant to normal chemical weathering and erosion, hence the survival of a chain of similar peaks such as neighbouring Arkle (Arcail) and Cranstackie, but is vulnerable to frost shattering, hence the sharp crests around the corries and extensive block fields and scree slopes.

Foinaven was named Foinne Bheinn on the first Ordnance Survey map edition of 1878, a name now added back. Its surveyed height was 2980 ft. This was revised to 914 metres on early metric editions, thus potentially qualifying it as a Munro, but an accurate survey in 2007 confirmed that at 911 metres it falls 12 feet (3.7 metres) short of the required 3,000 ft (914.4 m)..

The mountain extends for 8 km, with four main tops above 800 m, the highest being named Ganu Mòr. However on the first edition of 1878, it appears as Ceann Mòr, a more likely origin as ganu has no meaning in Gaelic (possibly a transcription error in redrawing the map for the second edition). This matches with the north top always being Ceann Garbh, thus 'big head' and 'rough head'. The two southern tops are nameless, but a prominent spur is noted as A' Cheir Ghorm.

The mountain inspired the name of the racehorse that went on to win the 1967 Grand National at odds of 100–1.
