= Laid =

Laid may refer to:

- "Get laid", a slang term for sexual intercourse

== People ==
- Laid Belhamel (born 1977), Algerian football player
- Laid Rebiga (born 1973), Algerian politician
- Laid Saidi (born 1963), Algerian CIA prisoner

== Geography ==
- Laid, Sutherland, a township in Scotland

== Film and television ==
- Laid (Australian TV series), a 2011 Australian television series
- Laid (American TV series), a 2024 American television series based on the Australian series

== Music ==
- Laid (album), the sixth release and fifth studio album by the British alternative rock band James, 1993
  - "Laid" (song), its title track
- Laid, a 1991 album by Skunk
- "Laid", a song by Loudon Wainwright III from 40 Odd Years box set, 2011

== See also ==
- Lade (disambiguation)
