= NGC 120 =

Galaxy in the constellation Cetus

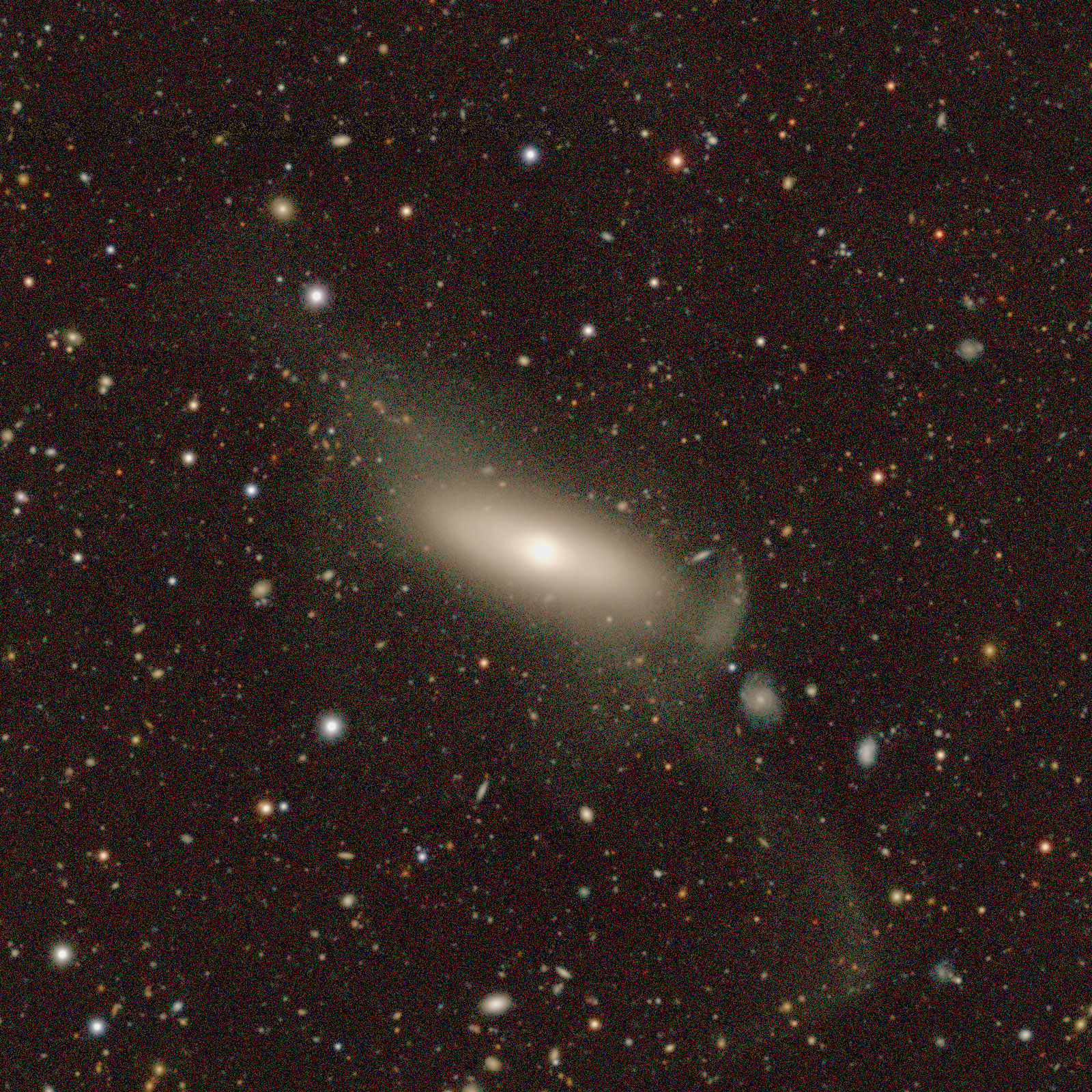
- legacy surveys DR9 image of NGC 120

Observation data (J2000 epoch)
- Constellation: Cetus
- Right ascension: 00^{h} 27^{m} 30.09072^{s}
- Declination: −01° 30′ 48.4591″
- Redshift: 0.0136
- Heliocentric radial velocity: 4057 km/s
- Distance: 168.0 Mly (51.52 Mpc)
- Apparent magnitude (B): 14.8

Characteristics
- Type: SB0^{0}:

Other designations
- UGC 267, MCG +00-02-033, PGC 1693

NGC 120 is a lenticular galaxy of type SB0? with an apparent magnitude of 13.4 located in the constellation Cetus. It was discovered on 27 September 1880 by Wilhelm Tempel.

== See also ==
- List of NGC objects
