= NGC 1573 =

Elliptical galaxy in the constellation Camelopardalis

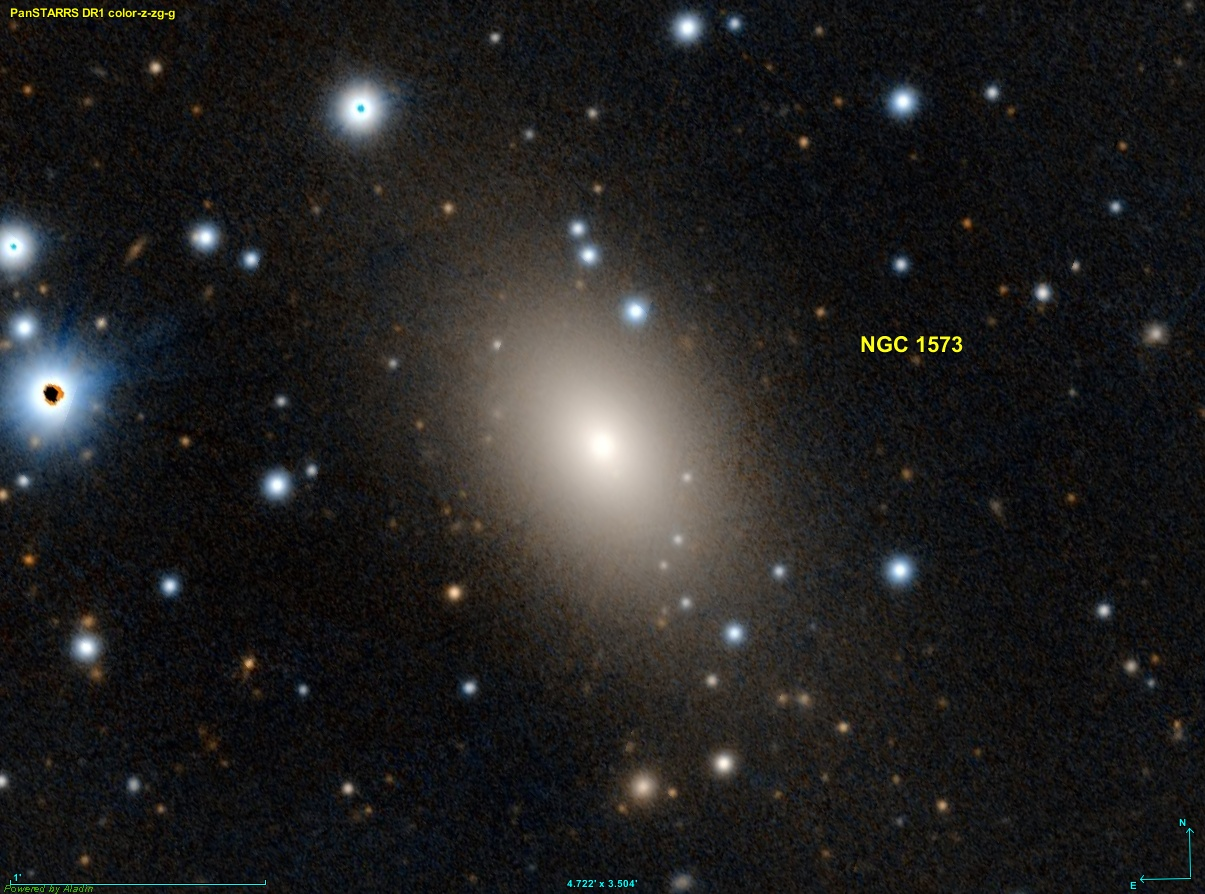
- Pan-STARRS image of NGC 1573

Observation data (J2000 epoch)
- Constellation: Camelopardalis
- Right ascension: 04^{h} 35^{m} 03.975^{s}
- Declination: +73° 15′ 44.66″
- Redshift: 0.014080
- Heliocentric radial velocity: 4221 km/s
- Distance: 188.84 ± 15.59 Mly (57.900 ± 4.781 Mpc)
- Apparent magnitude (V): 11.50
- Apparent magnitude (B): 13.3
- Absolute magnitude (V): −22.31
- Magnitude (J): 9.565
- Magnitude (H): 8.858
- Magnitude (K): 8.555

Characteristics
- Type: E
- Size: 112,200 ly (34,390 pc) (Note: RC3 D_{0} (blue) values used.)
- Apparent size (V): 2.042′

Other designations
- UGC 3077, MGC+12-05-008, PGC 15570

NGC 1573 is an elliptical galaxy in the constellation of Camelopardalis. It was discovered on 1 August 1883 by Wilhelm Tempel. It was described as "very faint, small" by John Louis Emil Dreyer, the compiler of the New General Catalogue. It is located about 190 million light-years (58 megaparsecs) away.

The galaxy PGC 16052 is not a NGC object, nor is it physically associated with NGC 1573, but is often called NGC 1573A (or UGC 3150). It is an intermediate spiral galaxy with an apparent magnitude of about 14.0. In 2010, a supernova was discovered in PGC 16052 and was designated as SN 2010X.

According to A. M. Garcia, NGC 1573 is part of a galaxy group known as NGC 1573 group or LGG 115. NGC 1573 Group consists of at least 12 galaxies, NGC 1573, UGC 3110, UGC 3150, UGC 2848, UGC 2865, UGC 2916, UGC 3046, UGC 3143, UGC 3189, UGC 3131, UGC 3245 and UGC 3284.
