= NGC 2460 =

Galaxy in the constellation Camelopardalis

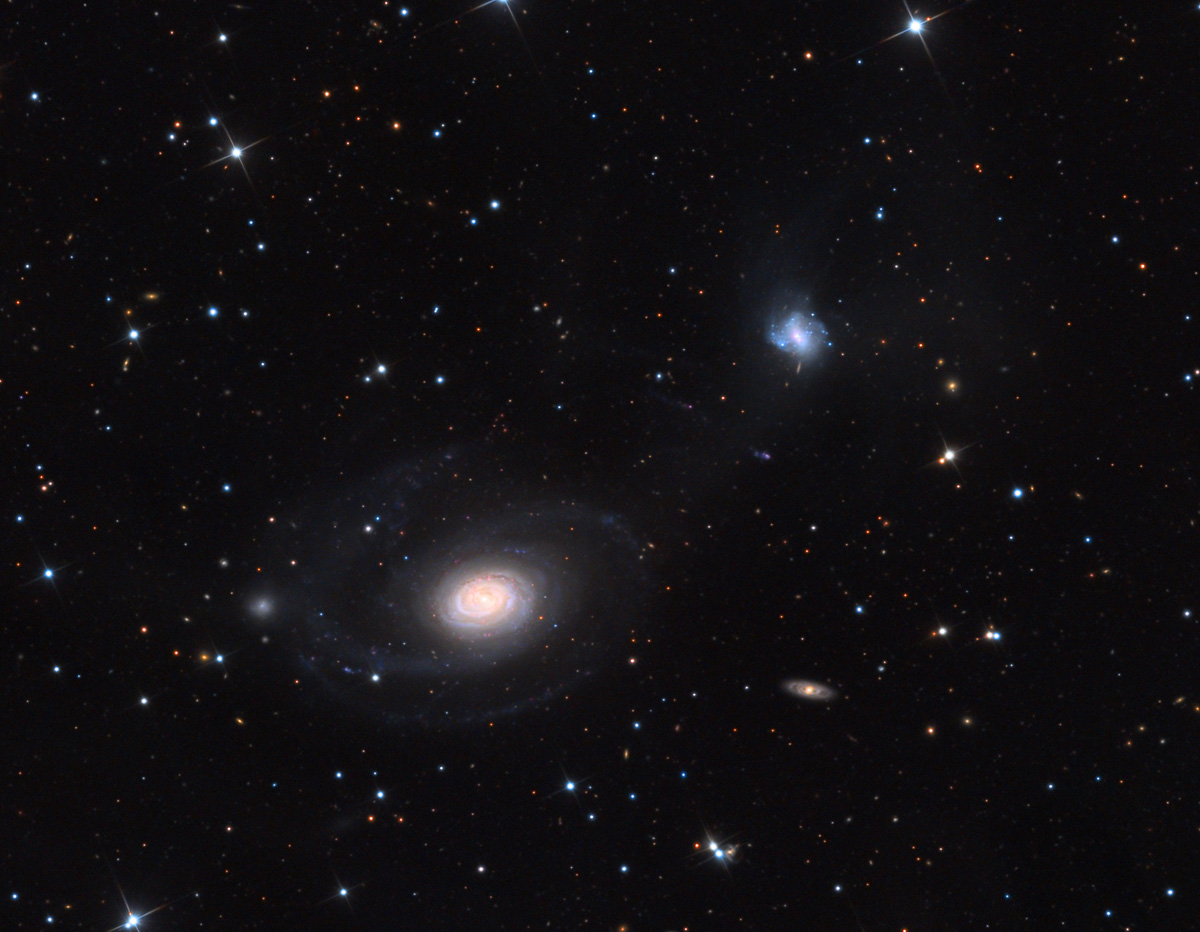
- NGC 2460 (lower left) and IC 2209 (upper right)

Observation data (J2000 epoch)
- Constellation: Camelopardalis
- Right ascension: 07^{h} 56^{m} 52.33083^{s}
- Declination: +60° 20′ 57.7266″
- Redshift: 0.004837
- Heliocentric radial velocity: 1446 km/s
- Distance: 73.3 ± 5.1 Mly (22.46 ± 1.57 Mpc)
- Apparent magnitude (V): 11.46
- Absolute magnitude (V): −21.0
- Surface brightness: 22.5 mag/arcsec2

Characteristics
- Type: SA(s)a

Other designations
- UGC 4097, MCG +10-12-021, PGC 22270

NGC 2460 is an unbarred spiral galaxy in the constellation Camelopardalis. It was discovered by German astronomer Wilhelm Tempel on August 11, 1882.

It is also identified as an active nucleus galaxy. Its redshift of 0.004837 gives a distance of 22 megaparsecs, or approximately 70 million light-years.

== Physical characteristics ==
NGC 2460 has an absolute magnitude of −21.0, and an apparent magnitude of 11.46. Several arms extend for long distances from the central galaxy, perhaps as a result of an interaction with nearby galaxy PGC 213434. The galaxy has a radial velocity of 1446 km/s.
