= NGC 707 =

Galaxy in the constellation Cetus

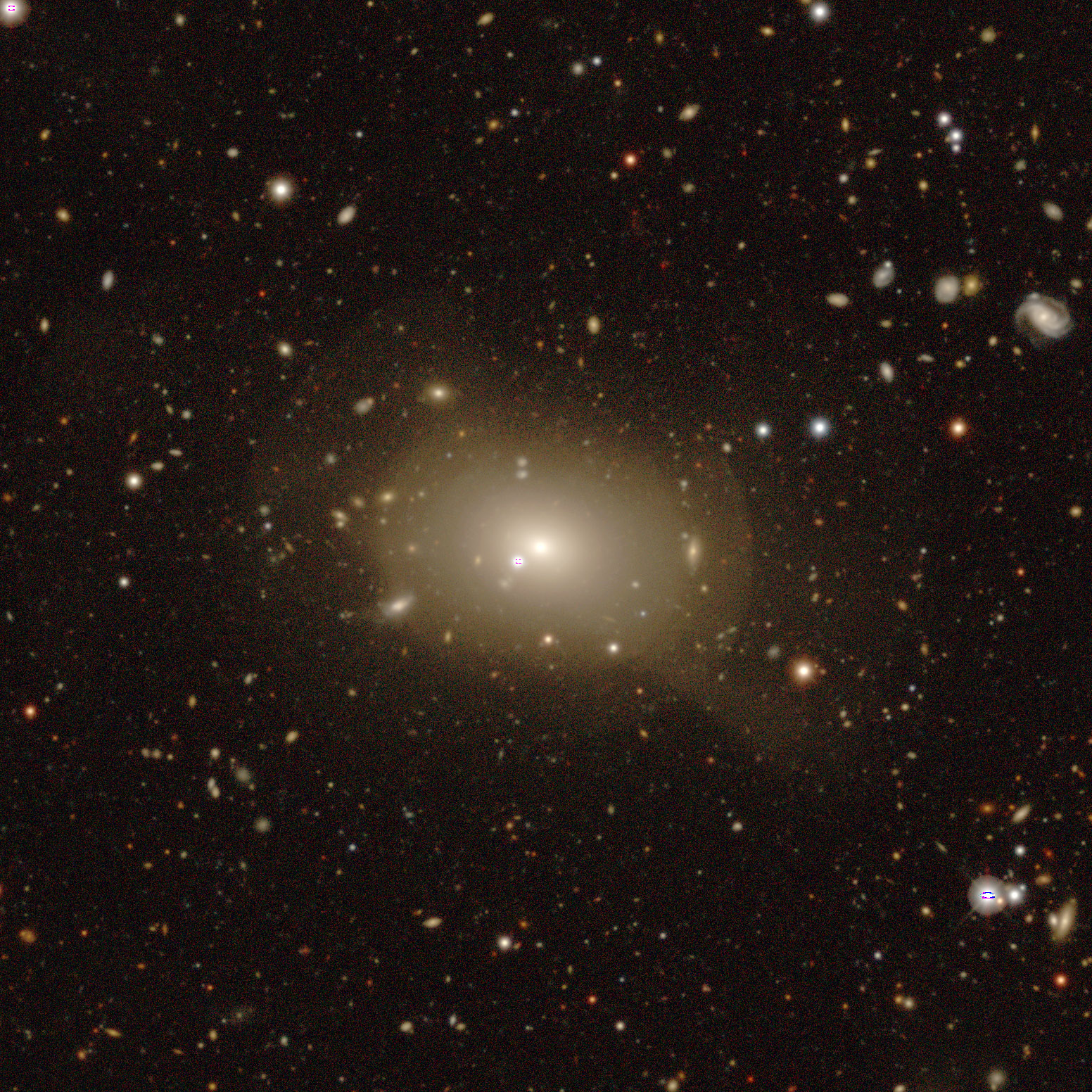

NGC 707 is a lenticular galaxy located in the constellation Cetus about 246 million light-years away from the Milky Way. It was discovered by the astronomer Wilhelm Tempel on November 13, 1879.
