= Whewell (crater) =

Crater on the Moon

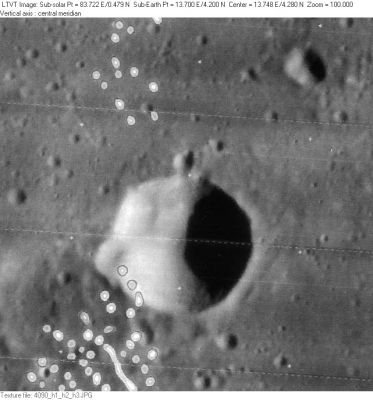
- Whewell crater, northeast is its satellite crater Whewell A
- Coordinates: 4.2°N 13.7°E
- Diameter: 13 km
- Depth: 2.3 km
- Colongitude: 347° at sunrise
- Eponym: William Whewell

Whewell is a lunar impact crater that lies on a stretch of lava-resurfaced terrain to the west of Mare Tranquillitatis. Its diameter is 13 km. It was named after the 19th-century English philosopher and naturalist, William Whewell. It is located to the east of the disintegrated crater Tempel and north-northwest of D'Arrest. To the east is Cayley, a slightly larger but very similar formation. To the North lies the Rima Ariadaeus, which is a linear rille that is 300 kilometers long and was formed when a section of the Moon's crust sank down between two parallel fault lines, producing a graben. Further north again, lies the 90 km wide crater Julius Caesar.

This is a circular, bowl-shaped crater with interior walls that slope down gently to a small interior floor. This crater has not been significantly eroded, and the rim is well-defined.

== Satellite craters ==
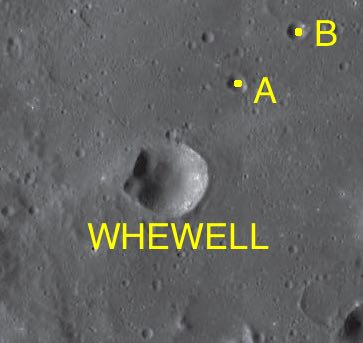
Whewell and its two satellite craters

By convention these features are identified on lunar maps by placing the letter on the side of the crater midpoint that is closest to Whewell.

Whewell	Latitude	Longitude	Diameter
A	4.7° N	14.1° E	4 km
B	5.0° N	14.5° E	3 km
