= NGC 54 =

Galaxy in the constellation Cetus

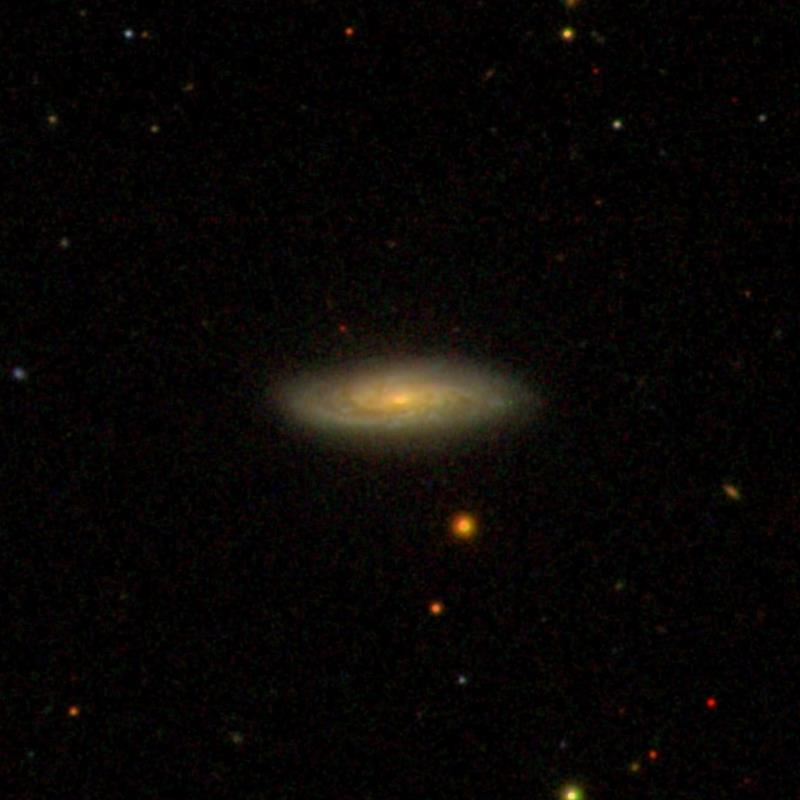
- SDSS image of NGC 54 and a nearby star

Observation data (2000.0 epoch)
- Constellation: Cetus
- Right ascension: 00^{h} 15^{m} 07.6^{s}
- Declination: 00° 07′ 58″
- Redshift: 0.017802
- Heliocentric radial velocity: 5335 km/s
- Distance: 240,000,000 ly (78,000,000 Parsecs)
- Apparent magnitude (V): 13.7

Characteristics
- Type: SB(r)a
- Size: 90,000
- Apparent size (V): 1.445' x 0.525'

Other designations
- MCG -01-01-060 2MASX J00150767-070624 2MASXi J0015076-070623 IRAS F00125-0723 AKARI J0015076-070623 6dF J0015076-070624 6dF J0015077-070624 LDCE 0010 NED004 HDCE 0009 NED004 USGC S005 NED03 GSC 4670 00994 PGC 1011 NVSS J001507-070622

NGC 54 is an edge-on spiral galaxy in the constellation of Cetus. The galaxy was discovered by Wilhelm Tempel in 1886, and he defined it as "very faint, pretty small, round." The galaxy is 90,000 light years in diameter, making it slightly smaller than the Milky Way.

== See also ==
- List of NGC objects (1–1000)

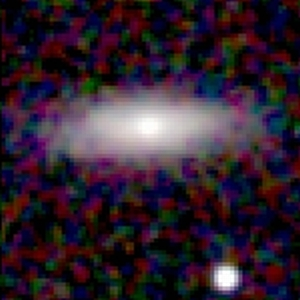
NGC 54 (2MASS)
