= NGC 333 =

Interacting galaxy in the constellation Cetus

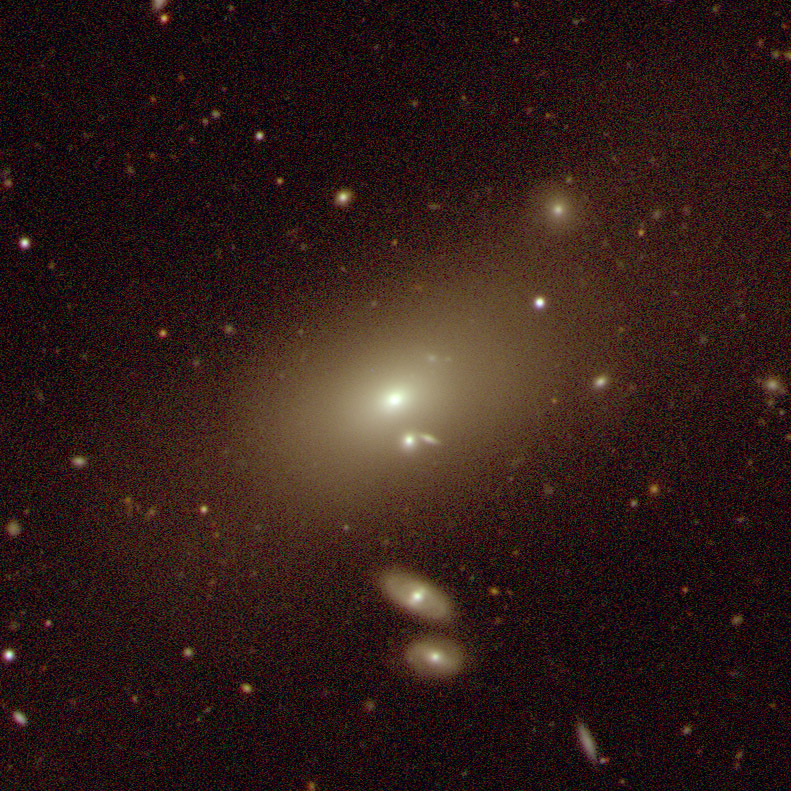
- DECam image of NGC 333

Observation data (J2000 epoch)
- Constellation: Cetus
- Right ascension: 00^{h} 58^{m} 51.2^{s}
- Declination: −16° 28′ 13″
- Redshift: 0.055671
- Heliocentric radial velocity: 16226 km/s
- Distance: 638.9 Mly (195.88 Mpc)
- Apparent magnitude (B): 14.90

Characteristics
- Type: S0
- Apparent size (V): 1.6' × 1.0'

Other designations
- PGC 3519

NGC 333 is a lenticular galaxy located approximately 755 million light years away in the constellation Cetus. It was discovered in 1877 by Wilhelm Tempel. It is recorded as NGC 333 in the New General Catalogue. It has a companion galaxy, named PGC 3073571, which is presumed to be a physical pair with NGC 333.

NGC 333's location is 00 58 51.2987945616 (R.A.) and -16 28 08.952040380 (Dec.). Its radial velocity is 16226 km/s.
