= NGC 113 =

Galaxy in the constellation Cetus

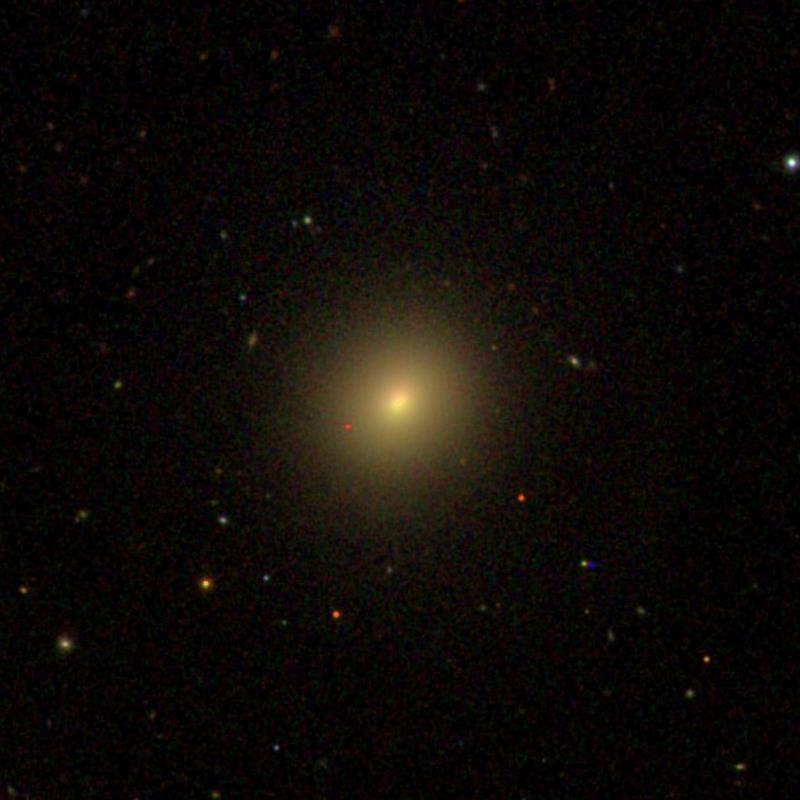
- SDSS image of NGC 113

Observation data (J2000 epoch)
- Constellation: Cetus
- Right ascension: 00^{h} 26^{m} 54.626^{s}
- Declination: −02° 30′ 03.02″
- Redshift: 0.014497
- Heliocentric radial velocity: 4315 km/s
- Distance: 154.0 Mly (47.21 Mpc)

Characteristics
- Type: SA0^{−}:

Other designations
- MCG -01-02-016, PGC 1656

NGC 113 is an unbarred lenticular galaxy located in the constellation Cetus. It was discovered by German astronomer, Ernst Wilhelm Leberecht Tempel, on August 27, 1876.
