= Klotho =

Klotho may refer to

- Clotho, one of the Moirai, or Fates, in Greek mythology
- 97 Klotho, an asteroid
- Klotho (biology), a membrane protein
- Clotho (software), a software suite for synthetic biology.
- Clotho (Arrowverse), a fictional character
