= NGC 165 =

Galaxy in the constellation Cetus

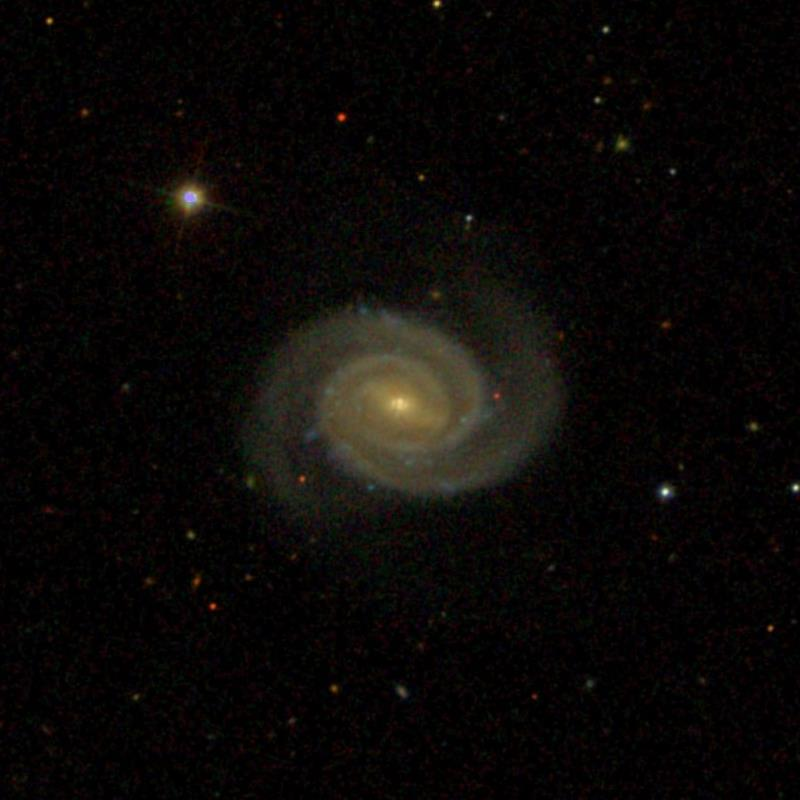
- SDSS image of NGC 165

Observation data (J2000 epoch)
- Constellation: Cetus
- Right ascension: 00^{h} 36^{m} 28.902^{s}
- Declination: −10° 06′ 22.36″
- Redshift: 0.019617
- Heliocentric radial velocity: 5881
- Distance: 268.51 ± 8.18 Mly (82.325 ± 2.508 Mpc)
- Apparent magnitude (V): 13.08
- Apparent magnitude (B): 13.88

Characteristics
- Type: SB(rs)bc
- Apparent size (V): 1.6′ × 1.3′

Other designations
- MCG-02-02-069, PGC 2182

NGC 165 is a barred spiral galaxy located in the constellation Cetus. It was discovered in 1882 by Wilhelm Tempel and was described by as "faint, large, star in centre, eastern of 2" by John Louis Emil Dreyer.

One supernova has been observed in NGC 165: SN 2021acnz (type Ib, mag. 19.2).
