= Lade =

Lade may refer to:

== People ==
- Bernd Michael Lade (born 1964), a German actor
- Brendon Lade (born 1976), an Australian rules footballer
- Sir John Lade (1759–1838), a baronet and Regency horse-breeder
- Heinrich Eduard von Lade (1817–1904), a German banker and amateur astronomer

== Places ==
- Lade (Λάδη), an island near the ancient Greek city of Miletus, near which the Battle of Lade was fought in 494 BC
- Lade, Kent, a coastal place in Kent, England
- Lade, Trondheim, an area in the city of Trondheim, Norway
- Lade parish, a civil parish in Valmiera district, Latvia
- La Academia de Esperanza, a school in Albuquerque, New Mexico, United States

== Other ==
- LADE, Líneas Aéreas Del Estado, Argentinian airline
- Lade (crater), a lunar crater named after Heinrich Eduard von Lade
- Mill lade, a predominantly Scottish term for a mill race

== See also ==
- Battle of Lade (494 BC), fought between the Ionians and the Persians
- Battle of Lade (201 BC), fought between Rhodes and Macedon, part of the Cretan war
- Earls of Lade, a group of earls in the Lade, Trondheim, area
- LADEE, the Lunar Atmosphere and Dust Environment Explorer, a spacecraft
