= NGC 4316 =

Spiral galaxy in the constellation Virgo

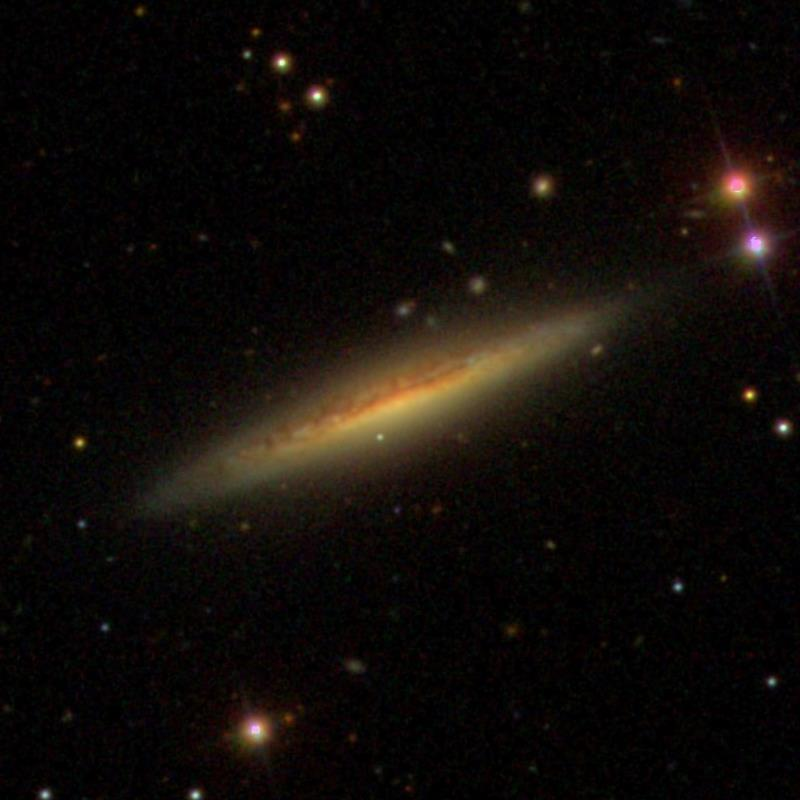
- SDSS image of NGC 4316.

Observation data (J2000 epoch)
- Constellation: Virgo
- Right ascension: 12^{h} 22^{m} 42.2^{s}
- Declination: 09° 19′ 57″
- Redshift: 0.004170
- Heliocentric radial velocity: 1250 km/s
- Distance: 72 Mly (22 Mpc)
- Group or cluster: Virgo Cluster
- Apparent magnitude (V): 13.5

Characteristics
- Type: Scd?
- Size: ~65,000 ly (20 kpc) (estimated)
- Apparent size (V): 2.79 x 0.63

Other designations
- UGC 07447, VCC 0576, PGC 040119, MCG +02-32-017

NGC 4316 is an edge-on spiral galaxy located about 70 million light-years away in the constellation Virgo. It was discovered by astronomer Wilhelm Tempel on March 17, 1882. NGC 4316 is a member of the Virgo Cluster and is classified as LINER and as a Seyfert galaxy.

The galaxy has undergone ram-pressure stripping in the past.

On February 28, 2003 a Type II supernova known as SN 2003bk was discovered in NGC 4316.
