= NGC 195 =

Spiral galaxy in the constellation Cetus

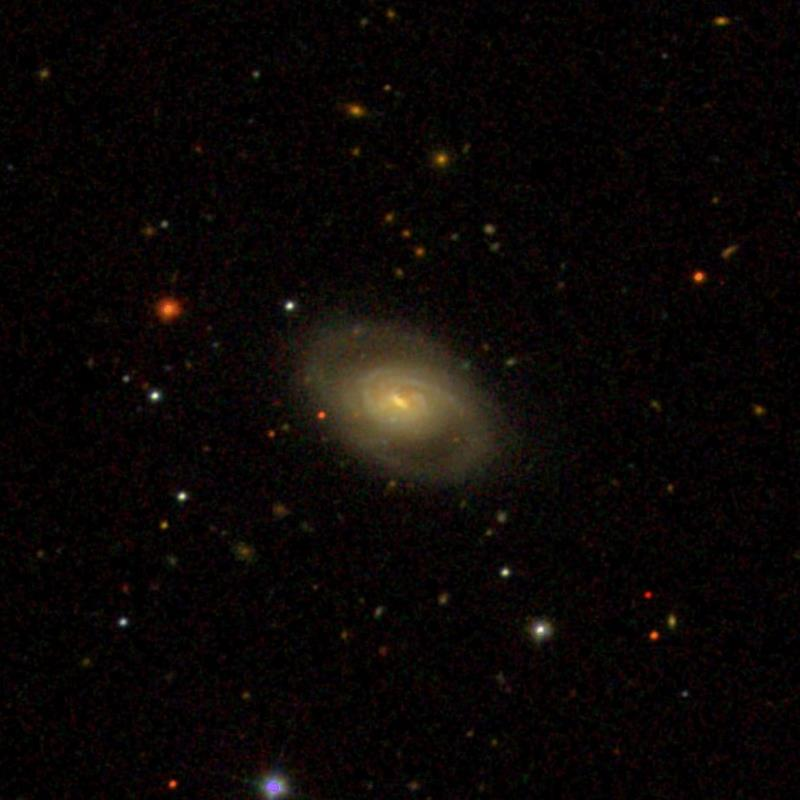
- SDSS image of NGC 195

Observation data (J2000 epoch)
- Constellation: Cetus
- Right ascension: 00^{h} 39^{m} 35.8^{s}
- Declination: −09° 11′ 40″
- Redshift: 0.016368
- Apparent magnitude (V): 14.2g

Characteristics
- Type: (R)SB(r)a?
- Apparent size (V): 1.21' × 0.69'

Other designations
- MCG -02-02-079, 2MASX J00393578-0911400, IRAS 00370-0928, IRAS F00370-0927, PGC 2391.

NGC 195 is a spiral galaxy located in the constellation Cetus. It was discovered in 1876 by Wilhelm Tempel.
