= 340 Eduarda =

Main belt asteroid

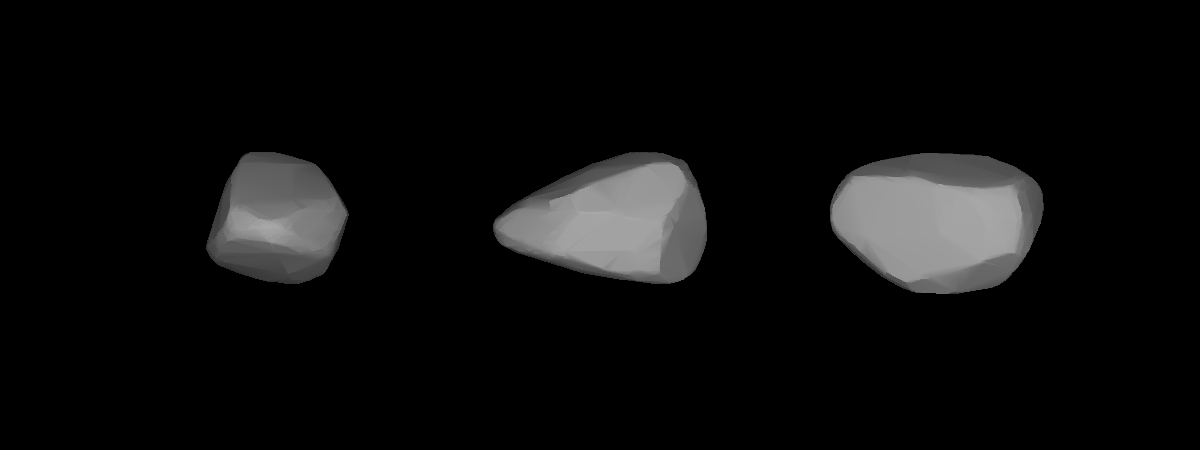
- A three-dimensional model of 340 Eduarda based on its lightcurve

Discovery
- Discovered by: Max Wolf
- Discovery date: 25 September 1892

Designations
- Named after: Heinrich Eduard von Lade
- Alternative designations: 1892 H
- Minor planet category: Main belt

Orbital characteristics
- Epoch 31 July 2016 (JD 2457600.5)
- Uncertainty parameter 0
- Observation arc: 116.98 yr (42727 d)
- Aphelion: 3.0610 AU (457.92 Gm)
- Perihelion: 2.43203 AU (363.827 Gm)
- Semi-major axis: 2.74650 AU (410.871 Gm)
- Eccentricity: 0.11450
- Orbital period (sidereal): 4.55 yr (1662.5 d)
- Mean anomaly: 23.6445°
- Mean motion: 0° 12^{m} 59.544^{s} / day
- Inclination: 4.6773°
- Longitude of ascending node: 27.051°
- Argument of perihelion: 41.720°

Physical characteristics
- Dimensions: 30.24±1.2 km
- Synodic rotation period: 8.0062 h (0.33359 d)
- Geometric albedo: 0.2118±0.018
- Absolute magnitude (H): 9.90

340 Eduarda is a main belt asteroid that was discovered by German astronomer Max Wolf on 25 September 1892 in Heidelberg. It was named after German banker and amateur astronomer Heinrich Eduard von Lade.

Photometric observations of this asteroid at the Oakley Observatory in Terre Haute, Indiana, during 2006 gave a light curve with a period of 8.04 ± 0.02 hours and a brightness variation of 0.25 ± 0.03 in magnitude.
