= Eriboll =

Coordinates: 58.468798°N 4.686019°W

Eriboll: Scottish Gaelic: Earabol
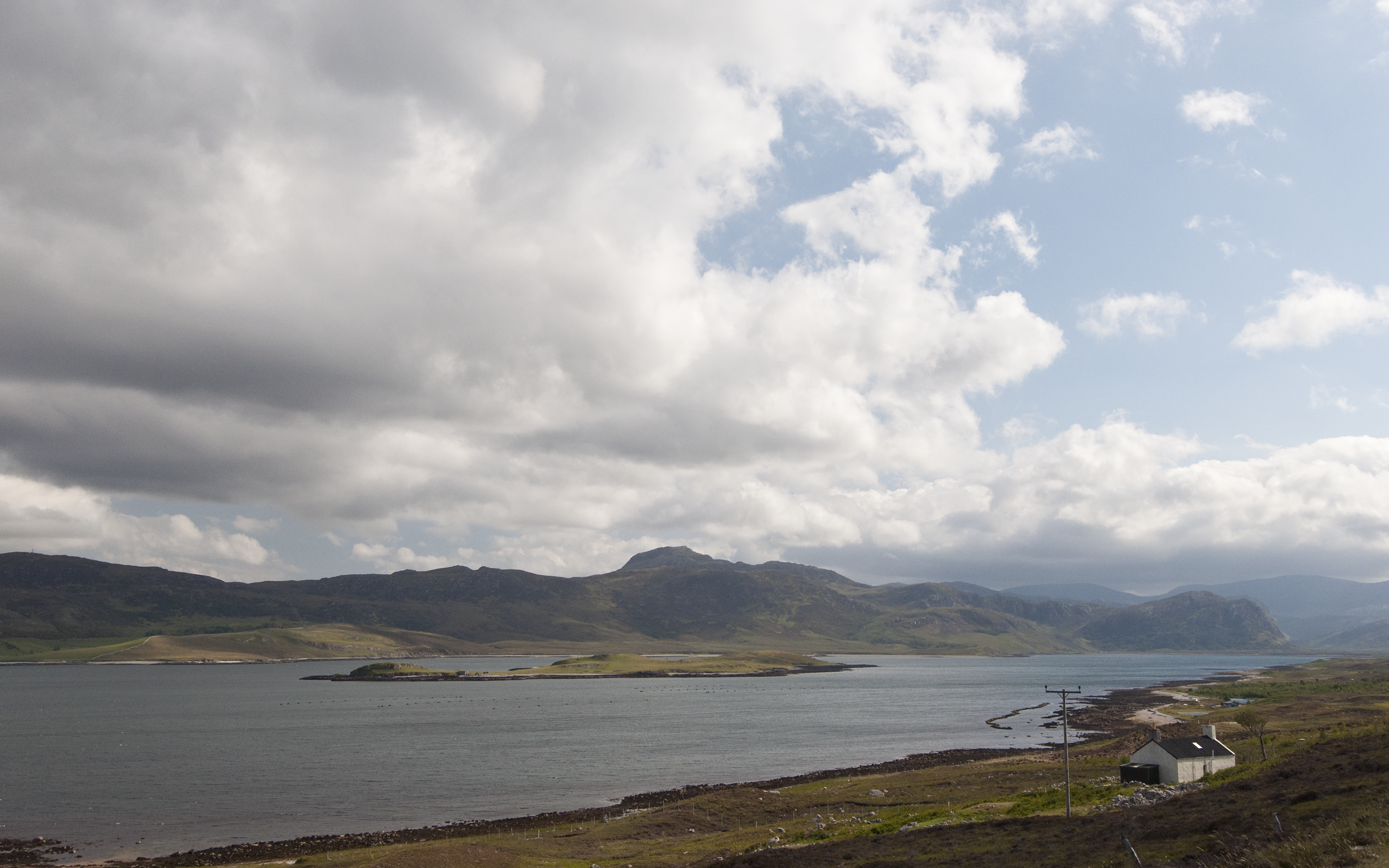
- Loch Eriboll, Eilean Choraidh and Laid, Scotland

- Location within the Sutherland area
- OS grid reference: NC434565
- Council area: Highland
- Country: Scotland
- Sovereign state: United Kingdom
- Post town: Lairg
- Postcode district: IV27
- Police: Scotland
- Fire: Scottish
- Ambulance: Scottish

Eriboll (Scottish Gaelic: Earabol) is a village in Sutherland, Scotland. The village is situated on the south eastern shore of Loch Eriboll, in the northern part of the former county of Sutherland.

The main A838 coast road connects the villages of Tongue, Achuvoldrach, Hope and Eriboll to the east and Portnancon, Sangobeg, Durness and on to Laxford Bridge to the west.

Its Norse name means Home on a gravel beach.
