= Cayley (crater) =

Crater on the Moon

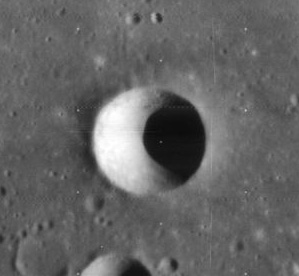
- Lunar Orbiter 4 image
- Coordinates: 4.0°N 15.1°E
- Diameter: 14.20 km (8.82 mi)
- Depth: 3.12 km (1.94 mi)
- Colongitude: 345° at sunrise
- Formation: Eratosthenian
- Eponym: Arthur Cayley

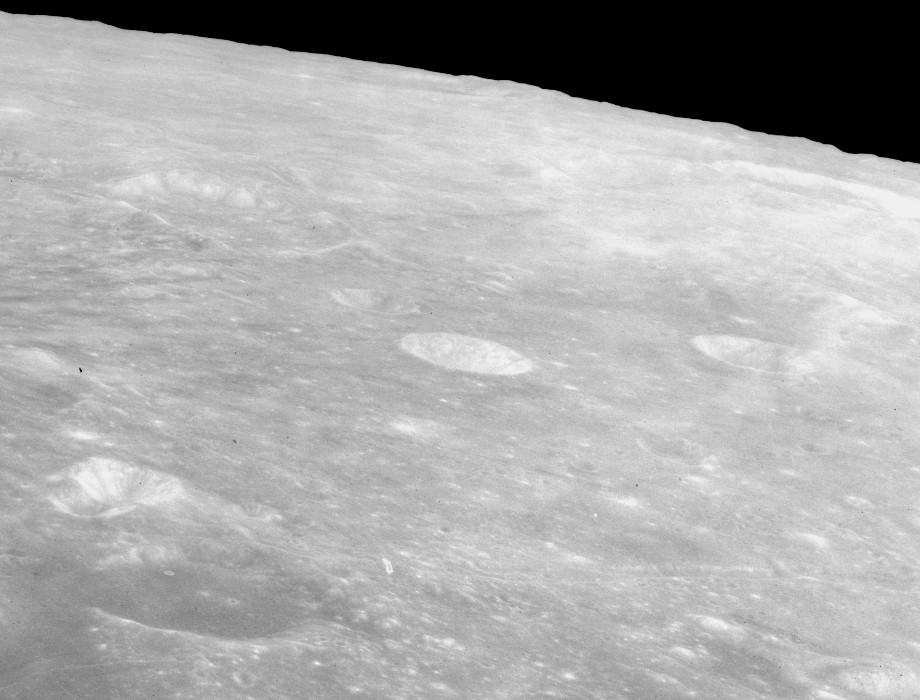
Oblique view from Apollo 15, showing Cayley (center), Ariadaeus (bright, left foreground), D'Arrest (left background), and Whewell (right)

Cayley is a small lunar impact crater that is located in a lava-flooded region to the west of Mare Tranquillitatis. It is bright and very distinct. This formation lies to the north-northwest of the smaller crater De Morgan and the larger D'Arrest. West and slightly north of Cayley is Whewell, a crater of about the same dimensions. To the north is a linear rille designated Rima Ariadaeus, which follows a course to the east-southeast.

This crater was named after the English mathematician Arthur Cayley (1821-1895). His name was introduced into lunar nomenclature by William R. Birt and John Lee during the 19th century. Its designation was officially adopted by the International Astronomical Union in 1935.

== Description ==
On the lunar geologic timescale, Cayley is a crater dating to the Eratosthenian age. This is a circular, bowl-shaped formation with a small interior floor at the midpoint. (Small being relative to the overall diameter, as it occupies about one-fourth the total cross-section.) The sloping interior walls are relatively light in hue, having a higher albedo as the surrounding terrain. However it is not nearly as bright as the slightly larger crater Dionysius to the east-southeast, and lacks a ray system. Spectral and chemical data from the Clementine mission indicate this impact did not excavate any cryptomare material.

The smooth, rolling plains to the east of this crater are called the Cayley Formation. It is somewhat similar to the lunar maria, but has a slightly higher albedo and is overlapped at the eastern edge by the Mare Tranquillitatis. Lunar scientists suspect that this plain may have resulted from deposits of ejecta from the formation of large impact basins such as Mare Imbrium or Mare Orientale. (The most likely source is the Mare Imbrium impact basin to the northwest.)
