= Agrippa (astronomer) =

Ancient Greek astronomer

Agrippa (Greek: Ἀγρίππας; fl. 92 AD) was a Greek astronomer. The only thing that is known about him regards an astronomical observation that he made in 92 AD. Ptolemy writes that in the twelfth year of the reign of Domitian, on the seventh day of the Bithynian month Metrous, Agrippa observed the occultation of a part of the Pleiades by the southernmost part of the Moon.

The purpose of Agrippa's observation was probably to check the precession of the equinoxes, which was discovered by Hipparchus.

The lunar crater Agrippa is named after him.
