= 81 Terpsichore =

Main-belt asteroid

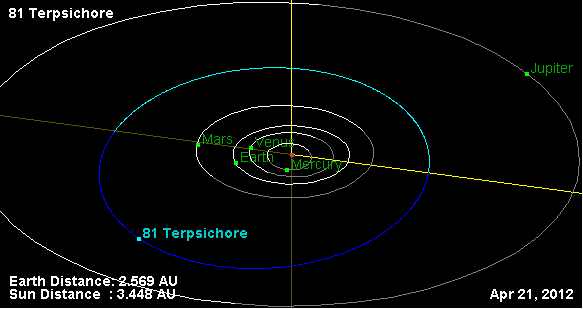
- Orbital diagram

Discovery
- Discovered by: Ernst Wilhelm Tempel
- Discovery date: 30 September 1864

Designations
- Pronunciation: /tɜːrpˈsɪxərɛ/
- Named after: Terpsichore
- Minor planet category: Main belt
- Adjectives: Terpsichorean /tɜːrpsɪxəˈriːən/

Orbital characteristics
- Epoch 9 June 2026 (JD 2461200.5)
- Uncertainty parameter 0
- Aphelion: 3.4553 AU
- Perihelion: 2.2484 AU
- Semi-major axis: 2.8519 AU
- Eccentricity: 0.2116
- Orbital period (sidereal): 1759.12 d (4.8162 yr)
- Average orbital speed: 17.43 km/s
- Mean anomaly: 159.607°
- Inclination: 7.8005°
- Longitude of ascending node: 0.8928°
- Argument of perihelion: 51.2300°
- T_{Jupiter}: 3.258

Physical characteristics
- Dimensions: 121.77 ± 2.34 km (composite estimate)
- Mass: (1.14±0.24)×10^{18} kg (Note: Calculated from its standard gravitational parameter GM = 0.076±0.016 km^{3}/s^{2}.)
- Mean density: 1.32 g/cm^{3} (Note: Assuming a diameter of 118 km.)
- Synodic rotation period: 10.943 hr
- Geometric albedo: 0.051
- Spectral type: C
- Absolute magnitude (H): 8.48

81 Terpsichore is a large and very dark main-belt asteroid. It has most probably a very primitive carbonaceous composition. It was found by the prolific comet discoverer Ernst Tempel on 30 September 1864. It is named after Terpsichore, the Muse of dance in Greek mythology.

This object is orbiting the Sun at a distance of 2.855 AU with a moderate eccentricity of 0.212 and an orbital period of 4.82 years. The orbital plane is inclined at an angle of 7.80° relative to the plane of the ecliptic. Infrared measurements provide a diameter estimate of 117.7±0.7 km. It has the spectrum of a carbonaceous C-type asteroid.

Photometric observations of the minor planet in 2011 gave a rotation period of 10.945±0.001 h with an amplitude of 0.09±0.01 in magnitude. This result is consistent with previous determinations. Two stellar occultation events involving this asteroid were observed from multiple sites in 2009. The resulting chords matched a smooth elliptical cross-section with dimensions of 134.0±4.0 km × 108.9±0.7 km.

== In popular culture ==
A space station orbiting 81 Terpsichore is the main setting in the science fiction story The Dark Colony (Asteroid Police Book 1) by Richard Penn.
