= De Morgan (crater) =

Crater on the Moon

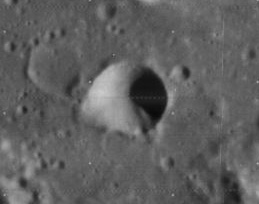
- Lunar Orbiter 4 image
- Coordinates: 3.3°N 14.9°E
- Diameter: 9.68 km (6.01 mi)
- Depth: 1.87 km (1.16 mi)
- Colongitude: 345° at sunrise
- Eponym: Augustus De Morgan

De Morgan is a small lunar impact crater that is located in the central region of the Moon, midway between the crater D'Arrest two crater diameters to the south, and Cayley to the north. This crater is circular and bowl-shaped, with a small interior floor at the midpoint between the conical, sloping inner wall. Its diameter is 9.7 km and it is nearly 1.9 km deep. Spectral and chemical data from the Clementine mission indicate this impact did not excavate any cryptomare material.

This formation is named after British mathematician and logician Augustus De Morgan (1806-1871). His name was included in the lunar nomenclature of W. William R. Birt and John Lee during the 19th century. Its designation was officially adopted by the International Astronomical Union in 1935.

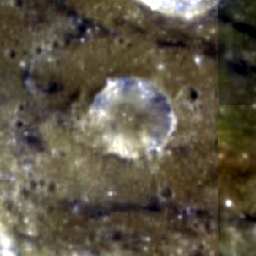
Clementine image of De Morgan crater
