= 74 Galatea =

Main-belt asteroid

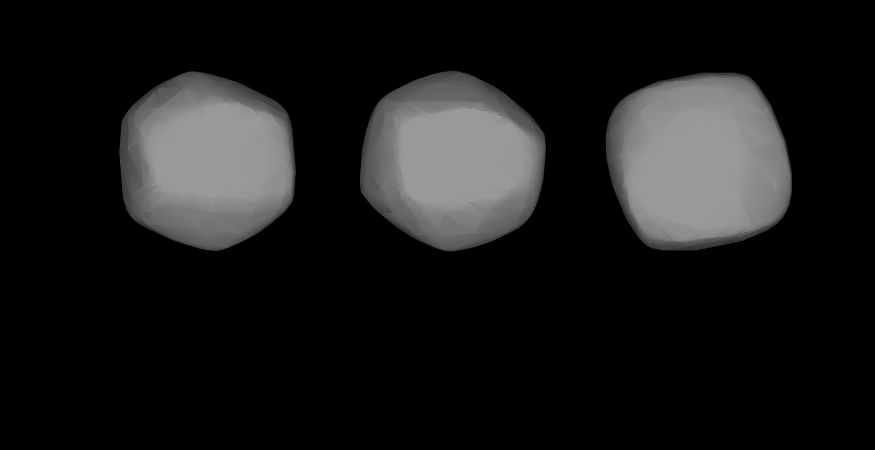
- Lightcurve based model of 74 Galatea

Discovery
- Discovered by: Ernst Wilhelm Tempel
- Discovery date: 29 August 1862

Designations
- Pronunciation: /ɡæləˈtiːə/
- Named after: Galatea
- Minor planet category: Main belt
- Adjectives: Galatean

Orbital characteristics
- Epoch 9 June 2026 (JD 2461200.5)
- Uncertainty parameter 0
- Aphelion: 3.4422 AU
- Perihelion: 2.1209 AU
- Semi-major axis: 2.7816 AU
- Eccentricity: 0.2375
- Orbital period (sidereal): 1694.46 d (4.6392 yr)
- Mean anomaly: 106.716°
- Inclination: 4.0729°
- Longitude of ascending node: 196.976°
- Argument of perihelion: 175.023°
- T_{Jupiter}: 3.288

Physical characteristics
- Dimensions: 120.67 ± 7.15 km (composite estimate)
- Mass: (1.41±0.22)×10^{18} kg (Note: Calculated from its standard gravitational parameter GM = 0.094±0.015 km^{3}/s^{2}.)
- Mean density: 1.61 g/cm^{3} (Note: Assuming a diameter of 119 km.)
- Synodic rotation period: 17.270 h
- Geometric albedo: 0.043
- Spectral type: C
- Absolute magnitude (H): 8.66

74 Galatea is a large C-type main-belt asteroid. Its carbonaceous surface is very dark in color with an albedo of just 0.034. Galatea was found by the prolific comet discoverer Ernst Tempel on 29 August 1862, in Marseille, France. It was his third asteroid discovery. It is named after one of the two Galateas in Greek mythology. A stellar occultation by Galatea was observed on 8 September 1987. The name Galatea has also been given to one of Neptune's satellites.

Photometric observations of this asteroid made during 2008 at the Organ Mesa Observatory in Las Cruces, New Mexico gave a light curve with a period of 17.270 ± 0.002 hours and a brightness variation of 0.08 ± 0.01 in magnitude. The curve displays four minima and four maxima. The spectra of the asteroid does not display evidence of aqueous alteration.
