= Laid, Sutherland =

Coordinates: 58.491°N 4.727°W

Laid: Scottish Gaelic: Leathaid
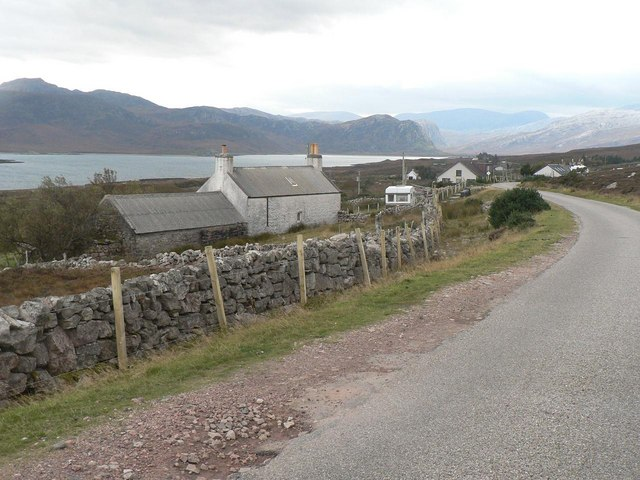
- Laid along the A838 and Loch Eriboll

- Location within the Sutherland area
- OS grid reference: NC411591
- Council area: Highland
- Lieutenancy area: Sutherland
- Country: Scotland
- Sovereign state: United Kingdom
- Post town: Lairg
- Postcode district: IV27 4
- Dialling code: 01971

Laid is a remote, linear crofting township scattered along the A838 road on the western shore of the sea loch, Loch Eriboll in Sutherland in the northern Scottish Highlands. The township is close to the north coast of Scotland in the Scottish council area of Highland around 6 miles (10 km) south of the village of Durness. The township of Portnancon is located 1 mile (1.6 km) northeast of Laid, along the A838 road.

The township was first settled in 1832, being created to house residents of Eriboll who had been cleared from the eastern shore of Loch Erriboll. The population has always been low with a small number of crofts on the land. The primary school closed in 1955.

The area was considered as a site for a proposed "superquarry" during the 1990s. The plan would have meant a Liechtenstein company, Vibel SA, develop the area for quarrying for aggregate use. The plans were dropped and Highland Council excluded the possibility of a major quarry in the area in its late 1990s structure plan, although plans for some mineral development continued.
