= Godin (crater) =

Crater on the Moon

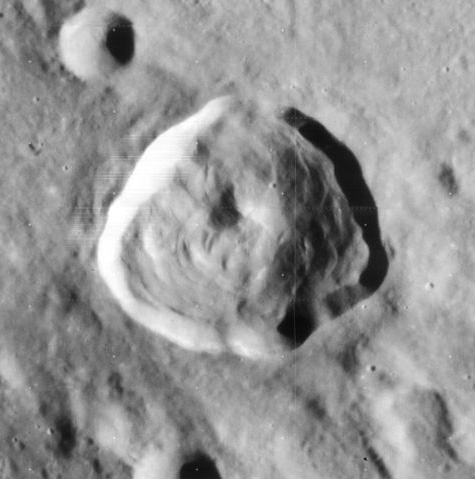
- Lunar Orbiter 4 image
- Coordinates: 1.8°N 10.2°E
- Diameter: 34 km
- Depth: 3.2 km
- Colongitude: 350° at sunrise
- Formation: Copernican
- Eponym: Louis Godin

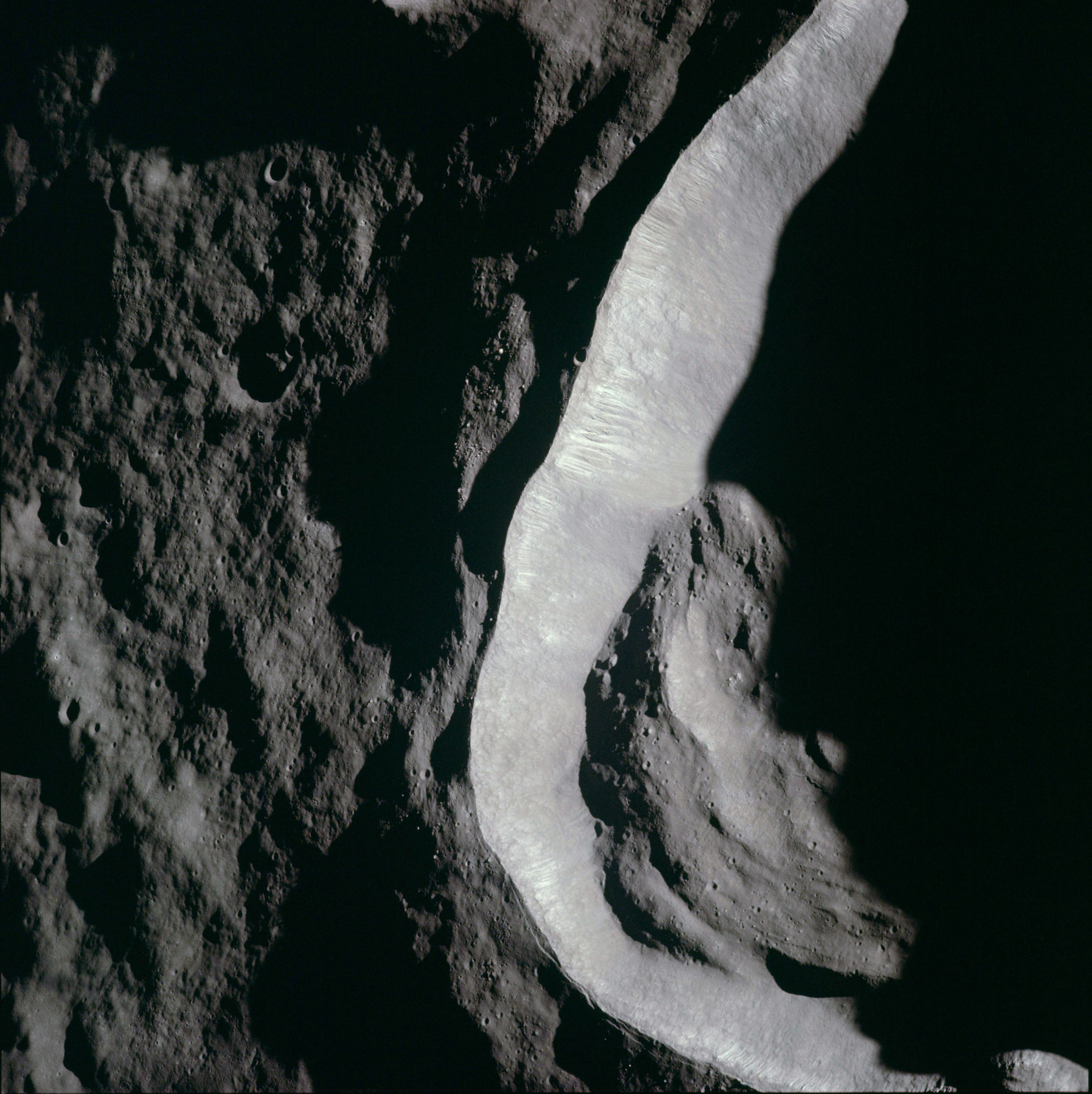
Close-up of west rim from Apollo 10

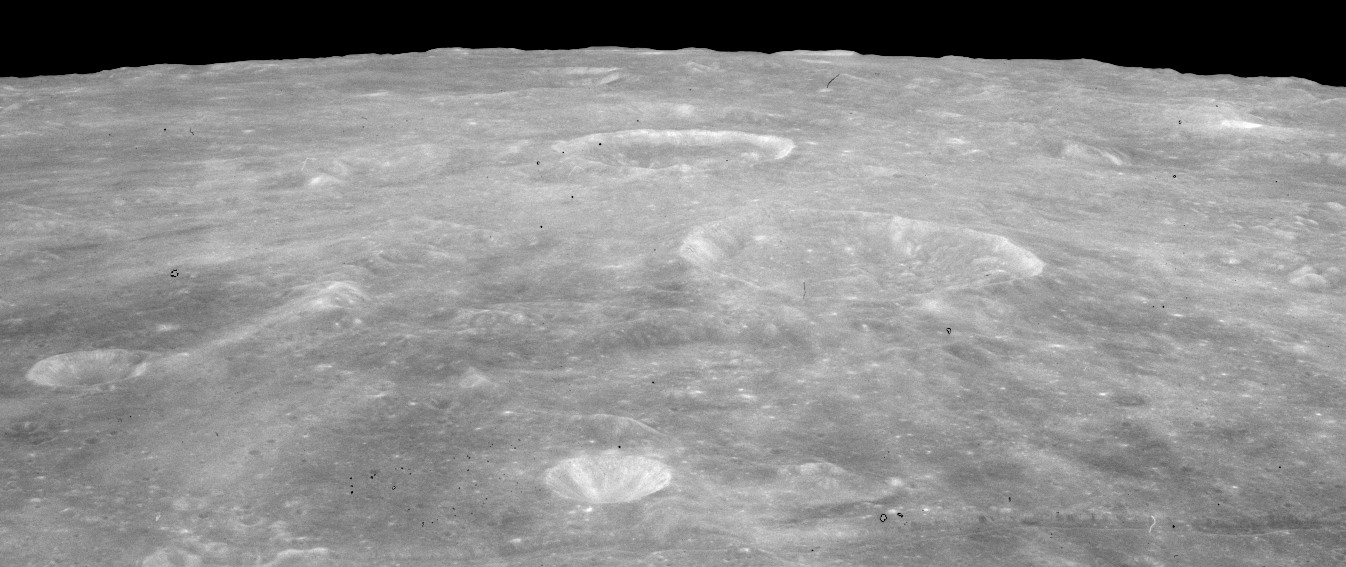
Oblique view facing south from Apollo 15, with Godin above center showing bright rays, and the crater Agrippa right of center.

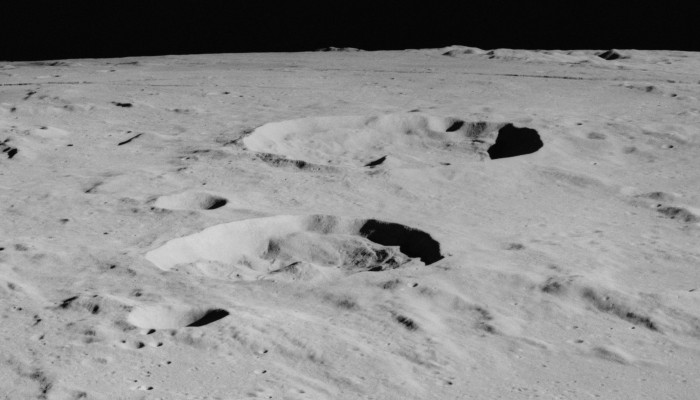
Oblique view facing north from Apollo 16, at a different lighting than the image above.

Godin is a lunar impact crater located just to the south of the crater Agrippa, on a rough upland region to the east of Sinus Medii. T. W. Webb called it a "fine crater". Its diameter is 34 km. The crater was named after 18th century French astronomer Louis Godin. The ruined crater Tempel lies to the northeast, on the east side of Agrippa. Due south is the flooded remains of Lade.

The rim of Godin is wider in the southern half than in the north, giving it a slightly pear-shaped outline. The interior is rough-surfaced, with a higher albedo than the surroundings. At the midpoint a central peak rises from the floor. Just barely visible visible to the west of this peak is a ruined ring plane on the crater floor. A faint ray system surrounds the crater, and extends for about 375 kilometers. Due to its rays, Godin is mapped as part of the Copernican System.

== Godin during full moon ==
Both Godin and the larger crater Agrippa north of it are an easy to detect couple during full moon. Typical of both craters are their very thin and white looking inner slopes. These bright thin rings are also noticeable on the photographic versions of charts LAC 59 and LAC 60 (pages 118 and 120) in The Clementine Atlas of the Moon (Ben Bussey / Paul D. Spudis).

== Satellite craters ==
By convention these features are identified on lunar maps by placing the letter on the side of the crater midpoint that is closest to Godin.

Godin	Latitude	Longitude	Diameter
A	2.7° N	9.7° E	9 km
B	0.7° N	9.8° E	12 km
C	1.5° N	8.4° E	4 km
D	1.0° N	8.3° E	5 km
E	1.7° N	12.4° E	4 km
G	1.9° N	11.0° E	7 km
