= D'Arrest (crater) =

Lunar crater

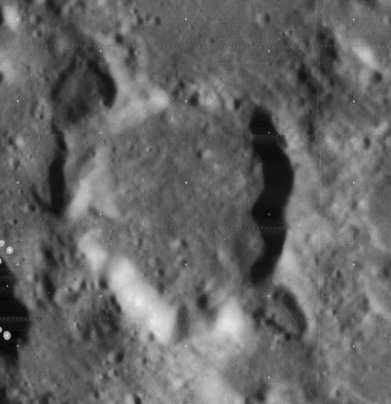
- Lunar Orbiter 4 image
- Coordinates: 2.3°N 14.7°E
- Diameter: 29.67 km (18.44 mi)
- Depth: 1.5 km (0.93 mi)
- Colongitude: 344° at sunrise
- Eponym: Heinrich d'Arrest

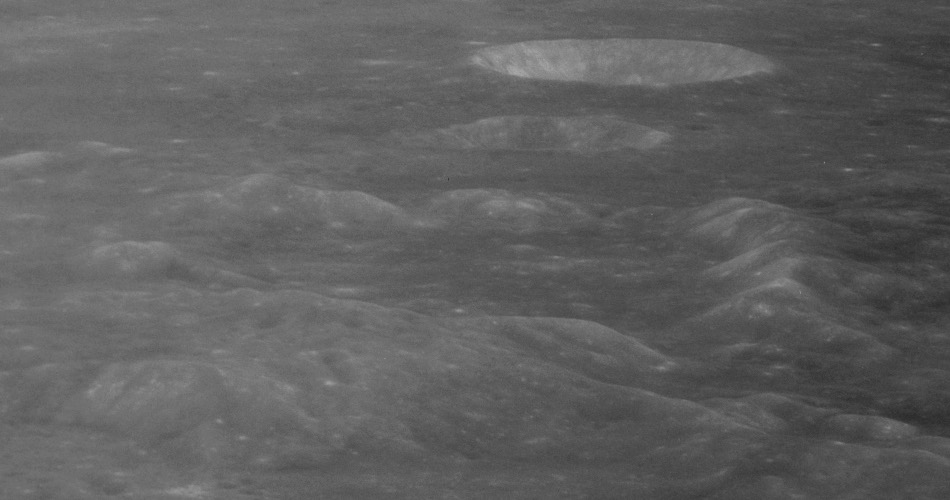
Oblique view from Apollo 12

D'Arrest is a lunar impact crater that is located in the lava-flooded region to the west of the Mare Tranquillitatis. It lies to the southeast of the crater Agrippa and northwest of Delambre. Just to the north are the small, bowl-shaped craters De Morgan and Cayley.

The outer rim of D'Arrest is broken in several places, with a gash at the south end and a wide gap to the northeast where only a low ridge remains in place of the original wall. The interior has been resurfaced by basaltic lava, leaving a nearly flat, featureless floor. The surviving rim is low and worn, with ridges connecting it to the south and southwest.

This formation is named after the German astronomer Heinrich Louis d'Arrest (1822-1875). His name was included in the lunar nomenclature of German astronomer Johann F. J. Schmidt in 1878. Its designation was formally adopted by the International Astronomical Union in 1935.

== Satellite craters ==
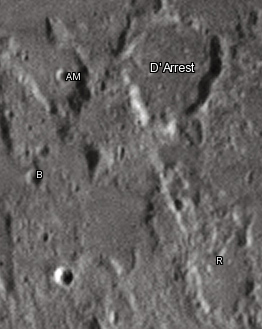
D'Arrest crater and its satellite craters as viewed from Earth

By convention these features are identified on lunar maps by placing the letter on the side of the crater midpoint that is closest to D'Arrest.

D'Arrest	Latitude	Longitude	Diameter
A	1.9° N	13.7° E	4 km
B	1.0° N	13.6° E	5 km
M	1.9° N	13.6° E	23 km
R	0.5° N	15.6° E	19 km
