= Tempel (crater) =

Crater on the Moon

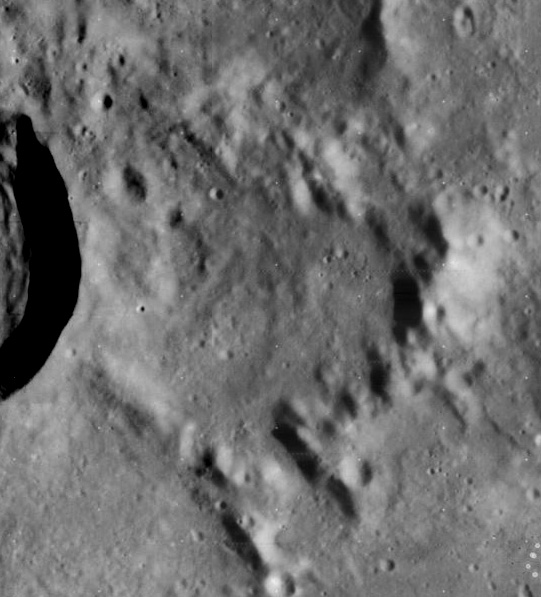
- Mosaic of Lunar Orbiter 4 images
- Coordinates: 3.9°N 11.9°E
- Diameter: 43 km
- Depth: 1.3 km
- Colongitude: 348° at sunrise
- Eponym: Wilhelm Tempel

Tempel is the remnant of a lunar impact crater whose outer rim has been eroded, indented, and reshaped by subsequent impacts and lava flows. It is attached to the eastern rim of the crater Agrippa, in an area that has been resurfaced by old lava flows. To the southwest is Godin, and to the east lies the small, bowl-shaped Whewell. Its diameter is 43 km. The crater was named after German astronomer Wilhelm Tempel.

There is a gap in the northwestern rim of Tempel that forms a protrusion that follows the rim of Agrippa. Smaller gaps exist in the southern rim, and the relatively flat interior surface of the crater is joined by these valley clefts to the lava-covered exterior. From here the flow can be followed eastwards until it joins the Mare Tranquillitatis. Little of the original rim remains intact, and the formation is now a somewhat circular range of rounded, irregular ridges.
