= Loch Eriboll =

Sea loch on the north coast of Scotland

Loch Eriboll/Loch Euraboil
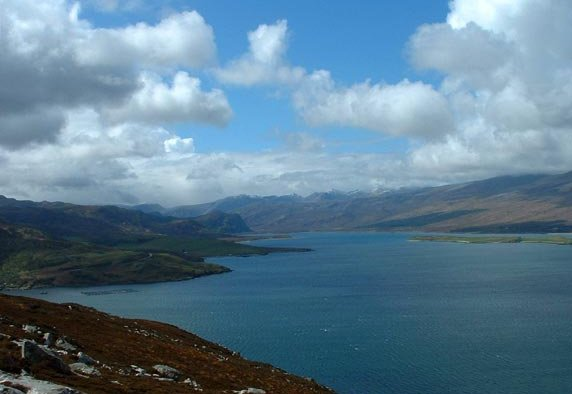

- Location within Sutherland
- Location: Scotland
- Coordinates: 58.505°N 4.670°W
- Type: Sea loch
- Basin countries: Scotland
- Loch Eriboll Lighthouse; Whiten Head
- Loch Eriboll Lighthouse on the East side of Loch Eriboll.
- Coordinates: 58.516804°N 4.648422°W
- Constructed: 1894 (first)
- Construction: skeletal tower
- Automated: 2003
- Height: 5 metres (16 ft)
- Shape: square parallelepiped clad tower with white panels as daymark and light
- Markings: white tower
- Operator: Northern Lighthouse Board
- First lit: 2003 (current)
- Focal height: 19 metres (62 ft)
- Range: 13 nmi (24 km; 15 mi) (white), 10 nmi (19 km; 12 mi) (red)
- Characteristic: Fl WR 10s.

Loch Eriboll (Scottish Gaelic: "Loch Euraboil") is a 16 km (9.9 mi) long sea loch on the north coast of Scotland, which has been used for centuries as a deep water anchorage as it is safe from the often stormy seas of Cape Wrath and the Pentland Firth.

Bronze Age remains can be found in the area, including a souterrain and a very well preserved wheelhouse on the hillside above the west shore. A small scale lime industry developed here in the 19th century and Ard Neakie, a promontory on the eastern shore of the loch, had four large lime kilns developed in around 1870. Before the development of the coast road around the loch in 1890, the Heilam ferry ran from the quay at Portnancon on the west shore to Ard Neakie. Both Ard Neakie and Portnancon were fishing stations.

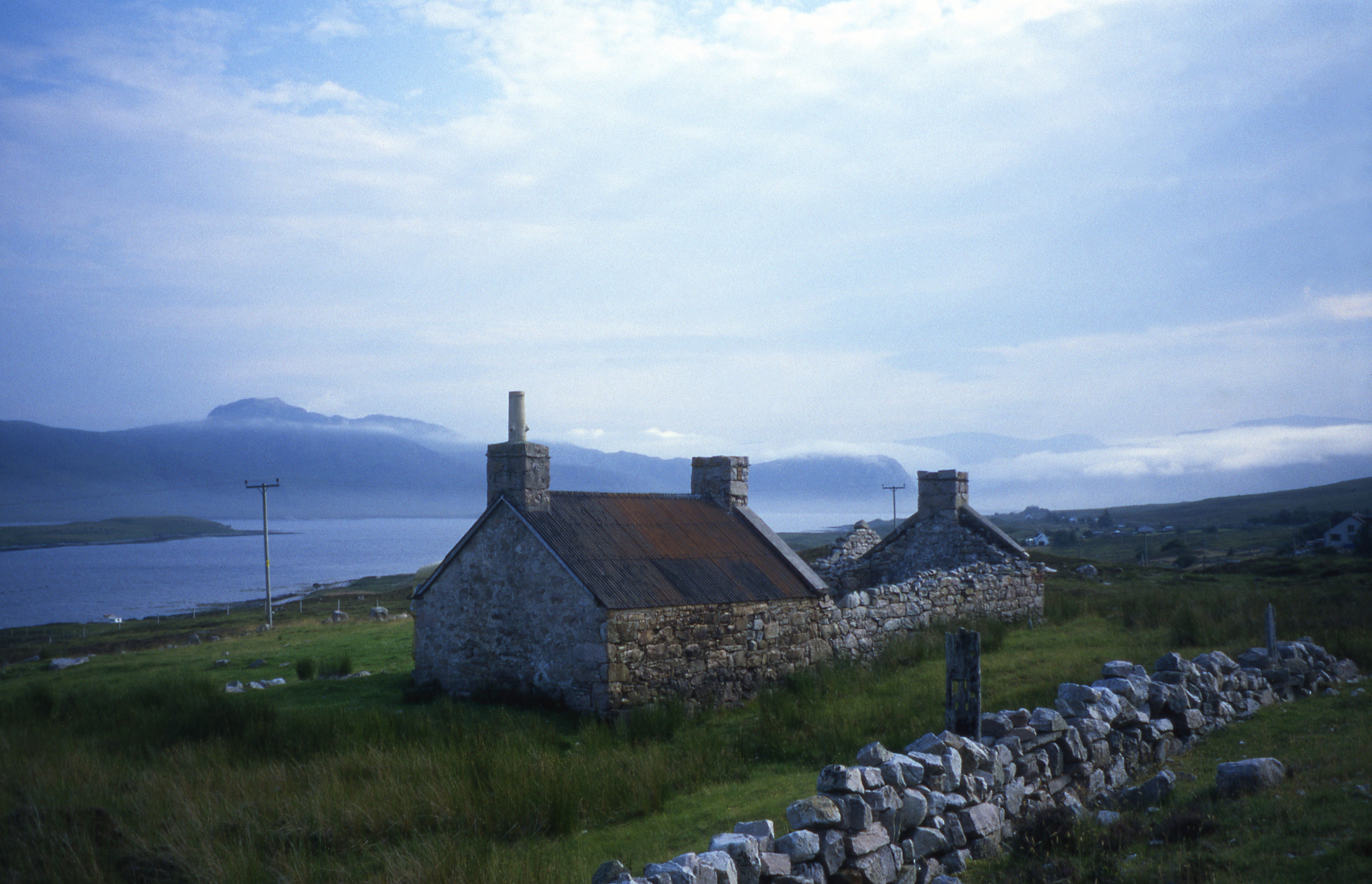
Farmhouse at Loch Eriboll

Around the shores of the loch are the crofting townships of Eriboll, Laid, Heilam, Portnancon and Rispond.

Eilean Hoan is located at the northern, seaward end of the loch and there are various small islets in the vicinity including A' Ghoil-sgeir, An Cruachan, An Dubh-sgeir, Eilean Clùimhrig, and Pocan Smoo. Today it is a largely unspoilt wilderness, in a region of high rainfall and with the lowest population density in the UK.

== Naval use ==
The Royal Navy have been frequent visitors to the loch, particularly during World War II. There are stones arranged by sailors into the names of their warships, including HMS Hood and Amethyst, on the hillside above the hamlet of Laid. It was nicknamed "Lock ’orrible" by the British servicemen stationed here during the war because of the often inclement weather. The largest island in the loch, Eilean Choraidh, was used as a representation of the German battleship Tirpitz for aerial bombing practice by the Fleet Air Arm prior to the successful Operation Tungsten in April 1944. The surviving 33 German U-boats, for example U-532 and U-295, formally surrendered here in 1945, ending the Battle of the Atlantic.

A leased area of the shore and loch is classified as a Minor training area by the Defence Training Estate, generally being used for amphibious and specialist training for three fortnights per year.

In 2011 the loch was used as part of Exercise Joint Warrior, the largest war games staged in the UK, involving the navy's erstwhile flagship, the assault ship HMS Bulwark. which has now been sold to the Brazilian navy.

== Fishing ==
The Annual Reports of the Fishery Board for Scotland provide an insight into the state of fishing from Eriboll Rispond and Smoo in the years before the First World War. Catches typically consisted of herrings haddocks and lobsters.

Fishery Statistics

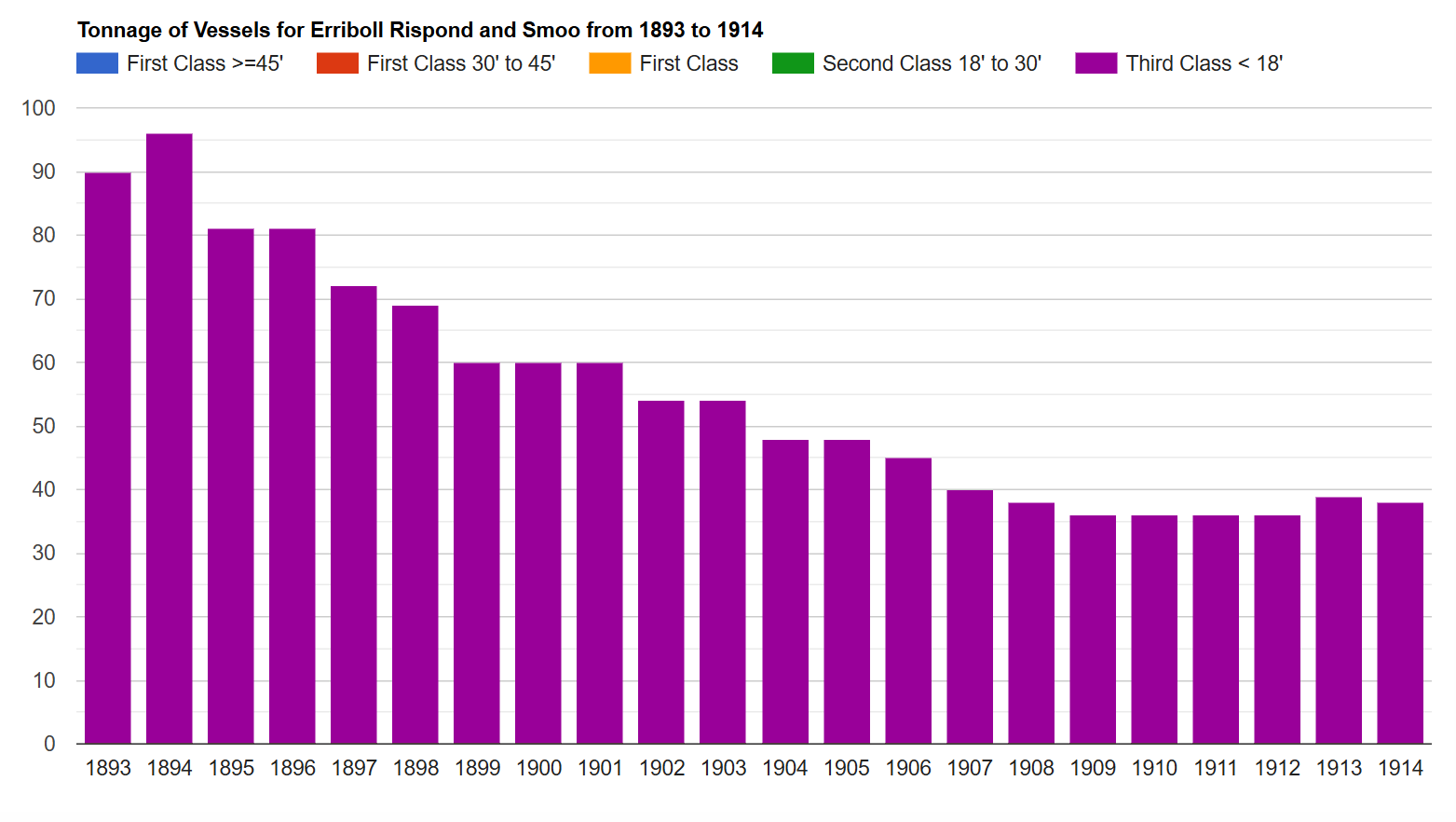
Tonnage of vessels

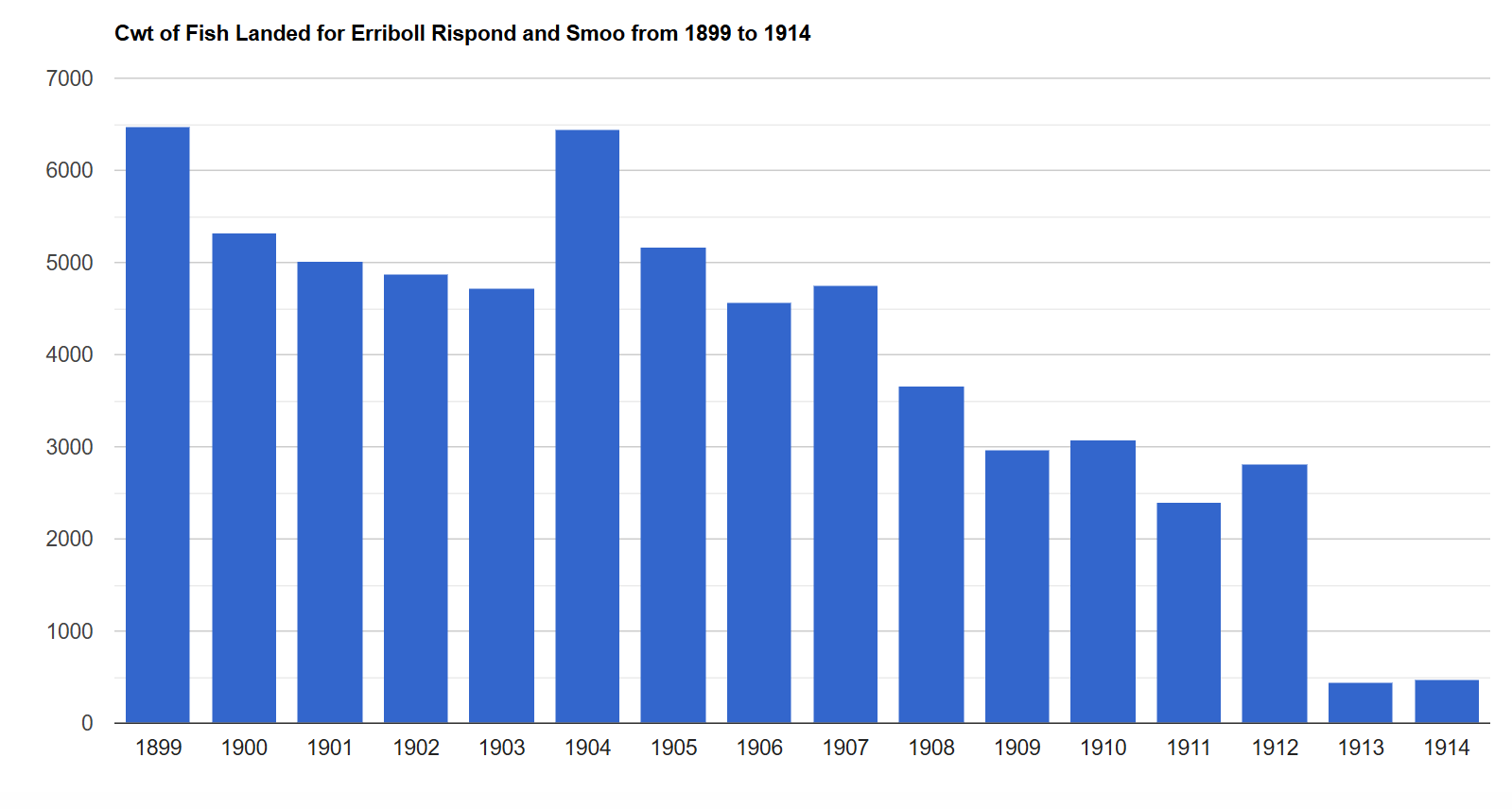
Cwt of fish landed

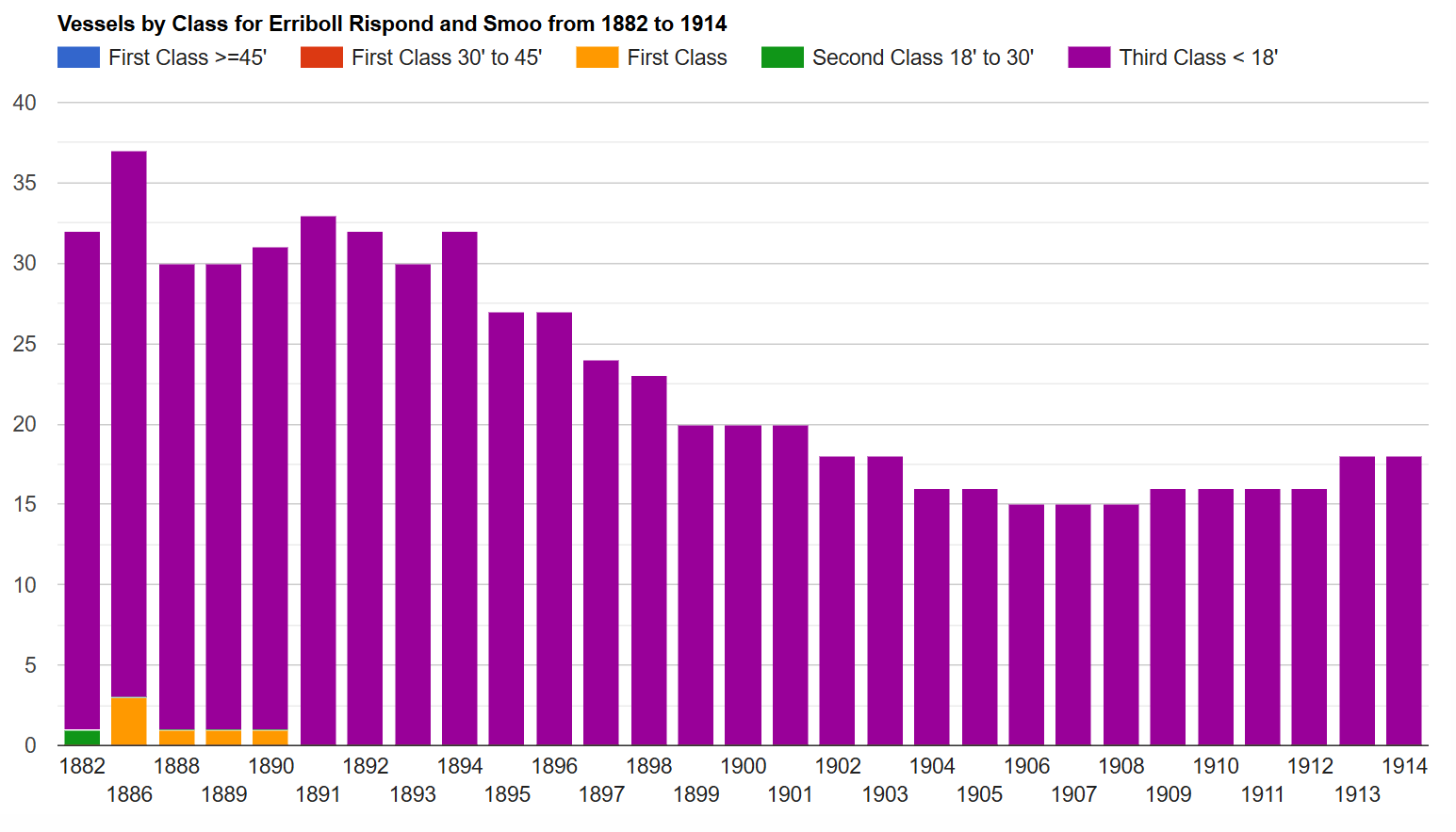
Vessels by class

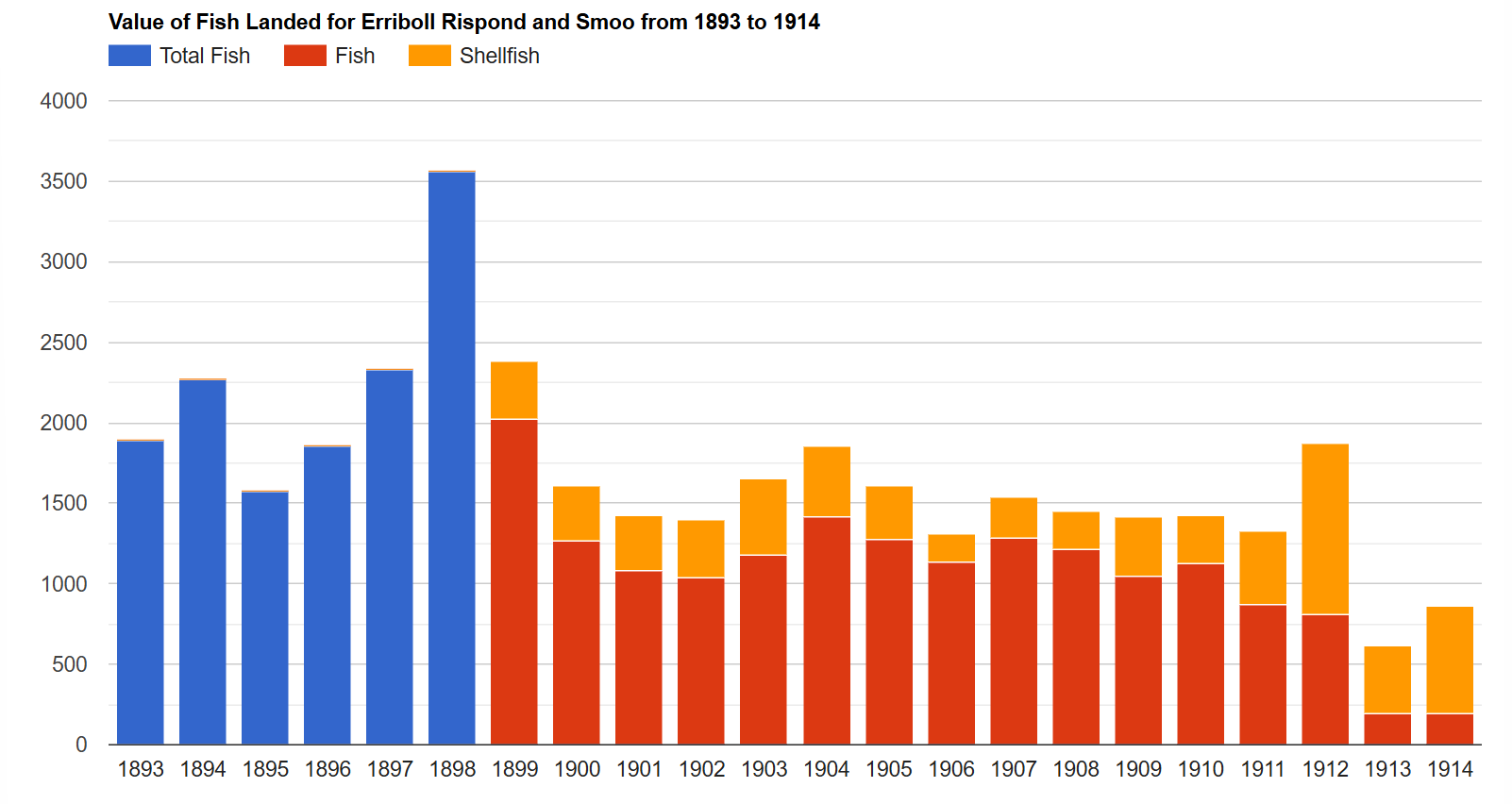
Value (£) of fish landed

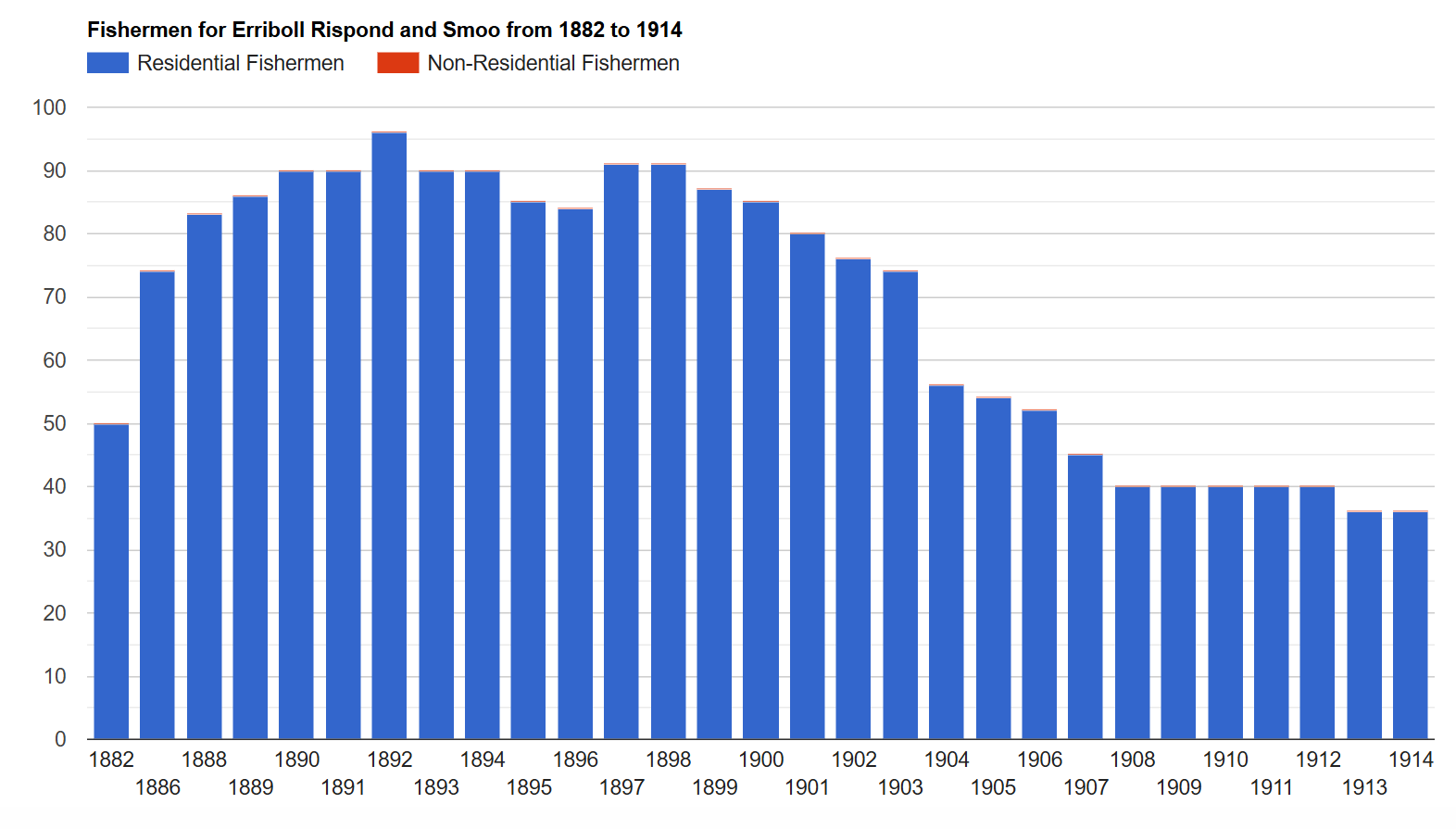
Fishermen

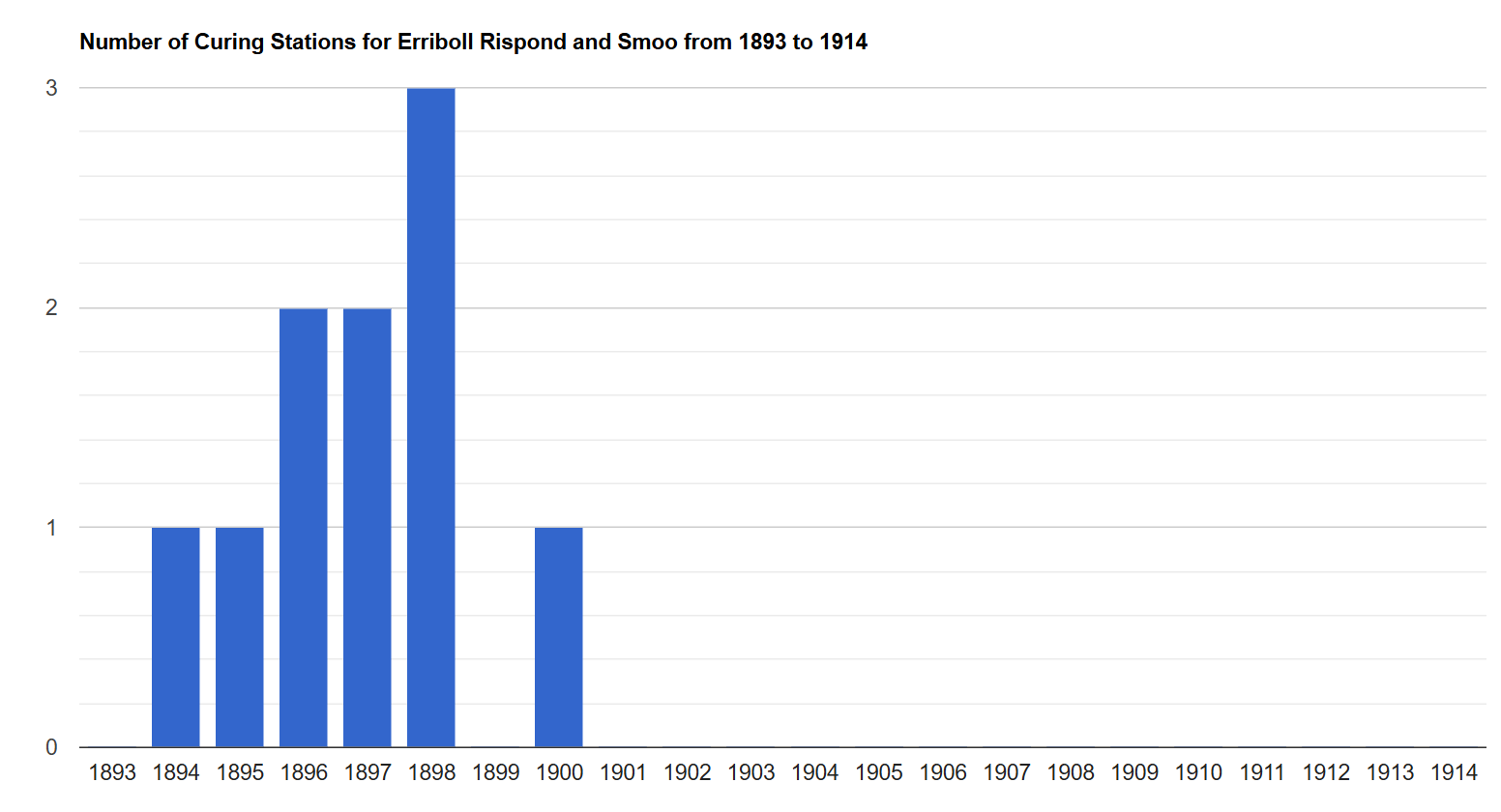
Number of curing stations

The very high result for 1898 is explained in a similar way to that of Talmine: "The native fishermen having crofts do not prosecute fishing with regularity. Curing was carried out on Loch Eriboll by three East Coast curers, who had a number of boats engaged to prosecute the herring fishing during the months of May and June. The natives do not participate much in this fishing".

== See also ==
- List of lighthouses in Scotland
- List of Northern Lighthouse Board lighthouses

== Notes ==
Haswell-Smith, Hamish (2004). The Scottish Islands. Edinburgh: Canongate. ISBN 978-1-84195-454-7.
