= Lade (crater) =

Crater on the Moon

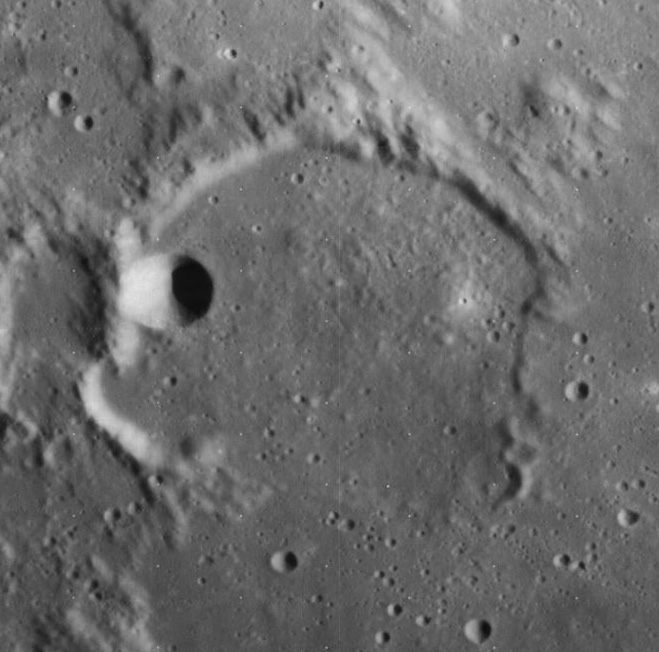
- Lunar Orbiter 4 image
- Coordinates: 1.3°S 10.1°E
- Diameter: 58 km
- Depth: 0.82 km
- Colongitude: 350° at sunrise
- Eponym: Heinrich E. von Lade

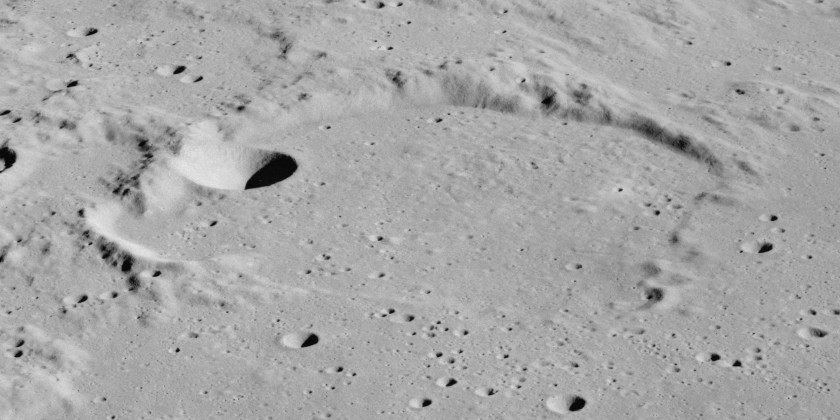
Oblique view from Apollo 16

Lade is the remains of a lunar impact crater that has been flooded by lava. Its diameter is 58 km. It was named after German astronomer Heinrich Eduard von Lade. To the north is the crater Godin and to the south-southwest is the worn, lava-flooded Saunder.

The southern rim of Lade has been completely covered or destroyed, and there are gaps in the relatively thin southeast rim. The surviving crater wall is worn and somewhat hexagonal in outline. There is a smaller bowl-shaped crater attached to the interior of the western rim. To the north the crater designated Lade B has been completely filled with lava.

== Satellite craters ==
By convention these features are identified on lunar maps by placing the letter on the side of the crater midpoint that is closest to Lade.

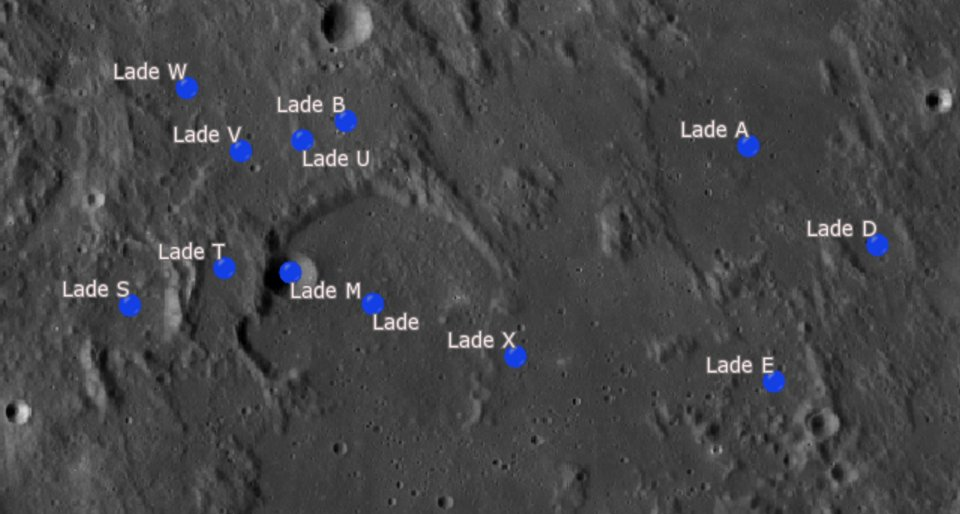
Lade and its satellite craters

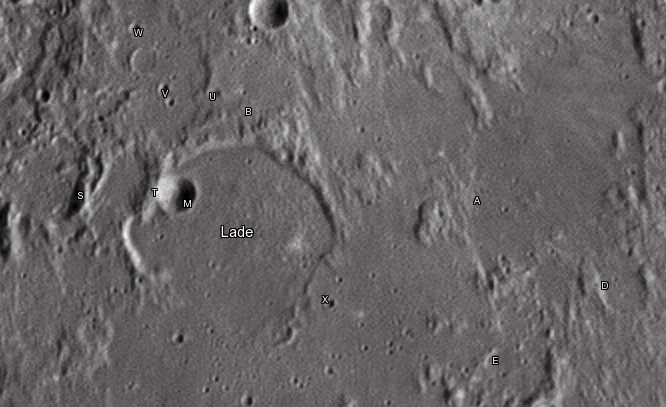
Lade crater and its satellite craters taken from Earth in 2012 at the University of Hertfordshire's Bayfordbury Observatory with the telescopes Meade LX200 14" and Lumenera Skynyx 2–1. The lunar north on the photo is about 15 to 20 degrees to the right

Lade	Latitude	Longitude	Diameter
A	0.2° S	12.9° E	57 km
B	0.1° N	9.8° E	24 km
D	0.9° S	13.7° E	16 km
E	1.9° S	13.0° E	21 km
M	1.1° S	9.4° E	12 km
S	1.2° S	8.3° E	24 km
T	1.0° S	9.0° E	18 km
U	0.1° S	9.6° E	4 km
V	0.2° S	9.1° E	4 km
W	0.2° N	8.6° E	4 km
X	1.7° S	11.0° E	3 km
