= Agrippa (crater) =

Crater on the Moon

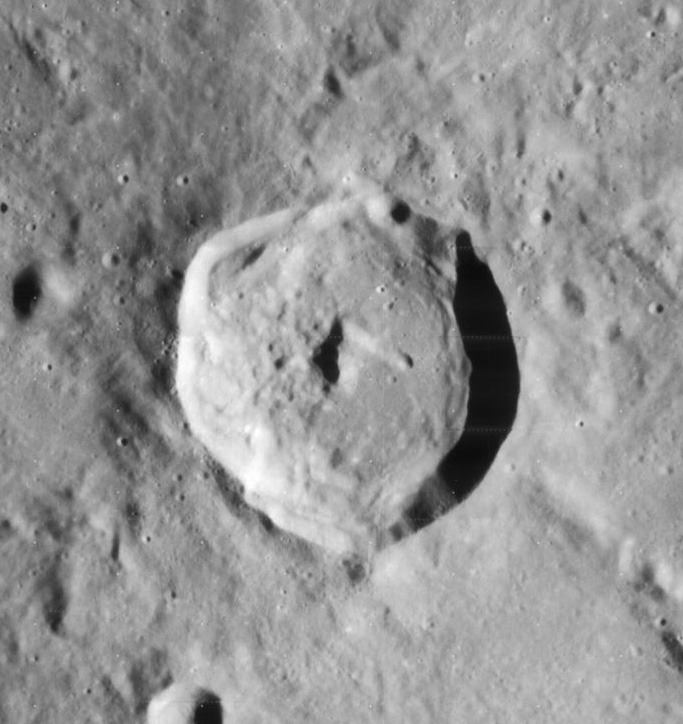
- Lunar Orbiter 4 image
- Coordinates: 4.1°N 10.5°E
- Diameter: 43.75 km (27.18 mi)
- Depth: 3.0 km (1.9 mi)
- Colongitude: 350° at sunrise
- Formation: Eratosthenian
- Eponym: Agrippa

Agrippa is a lunar impact crater that is located at the southeast edge of the Mare Vaporum. T. W. Webb called it a "fine crater". It is located to the north of the similar-looking crater Godin; the irregular Tempel lies just to the east. To the north and northeast, the rille designated Rima Ariadaeus follows a course to the east-southeast, reaching the western edge of Mare Tranquillitatis.

The crater is from the Eratosthenian period, which lasted from 3.2 to 1.1 billion years ago. The rim of Agrippa has an unusual shape, resembling the form of a shield with a rounded southern rim and a more angular northern half. The outer walls are steep and terraced, appearing brightly when illuminated by grazing light. A craterlet lies along the north wall, Agrippa H. The interior is somewhat irregular, with a central rise at the midpoint. The central peak is V-shaped, pointing northward.

Because of its location in the lunar Highlands near the visible center of the Moon, a site south of Hyginus rille in the vicinity of this crater was once suggested as a location for a moonbase in a 1961 US government report.

This crater is named after the 1st century Greek astronomer Agrippa. This designation was formally adopted by the International Astronomical Union in 1935. Its name was introduced into lunar nomenclature by Italian astronomer Giovanni Riccioli in 1651.

== Satellite craters ==
By convention these features are identified on lunar maps by placing the letter on the side of the crater midpoint that is closest to Agrippa. Agrippa B is to the north, Agrippa D and G are further west, Agrippa E is nearly northwest which is attached to another satellite crater Agrippa S, Agrippa F is not far to the east and Agrippa H is north-northeast touching the main crater.

Agrippa	Latitude	Longitude	Diameter	
Agrippa	Latitude	Longitude	km	mi
B	6.2° N	9.4° E	4	2.5
D	3.8° N	6.7° E	20	12.4
E	5.2° N	8.5° E	5	3.1
F	4.4° N	11.4° E	6	3.7
G	3.9° N	6.2° E	13	8.1
H	4.8° N	10.7° E	6	3.7
S	5.3° N	8.9° E	32	19.9

== Gallery ==
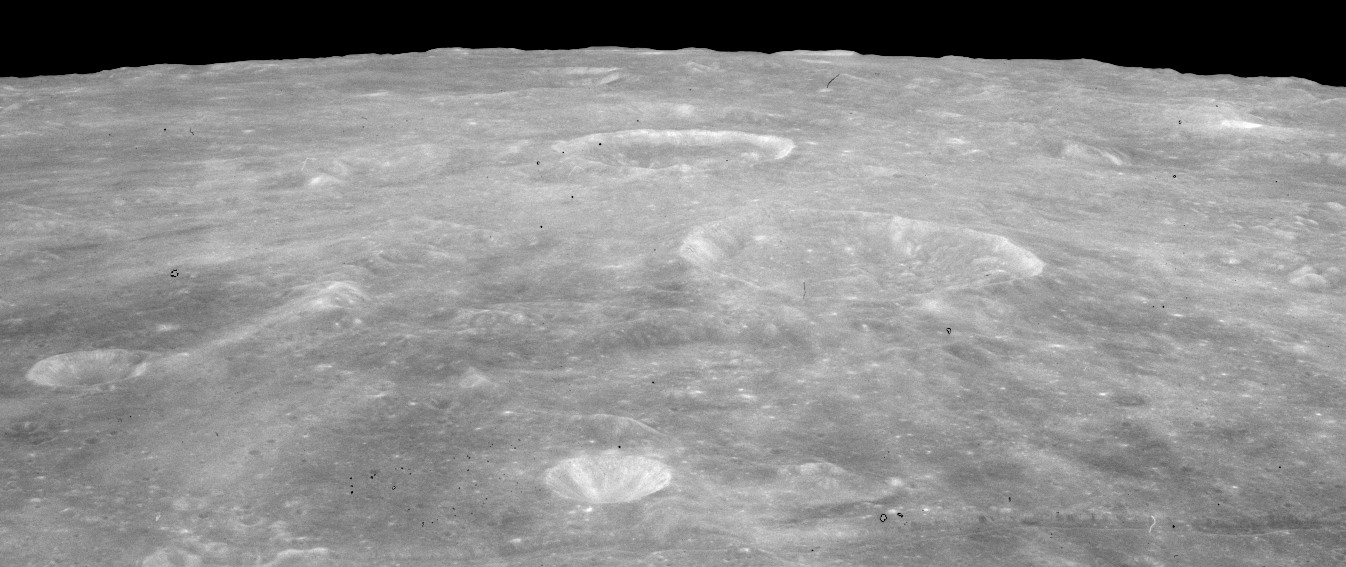
Oblique view facing south from Apollo 15, with Agrippa right of center, and the crater Godin above center showing bright rays.

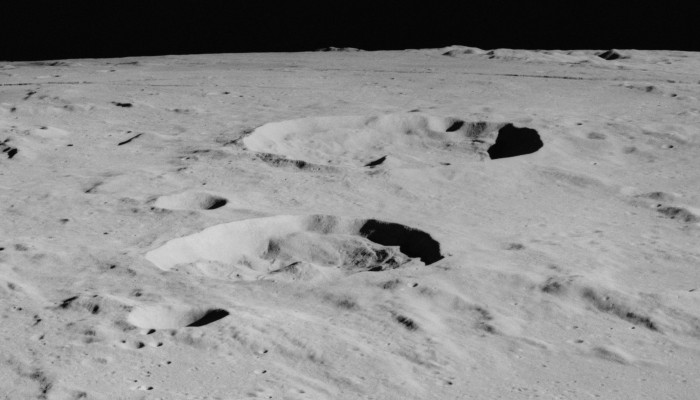
Oblique view facing north from Apollo 16, at a different lighting than the image above.

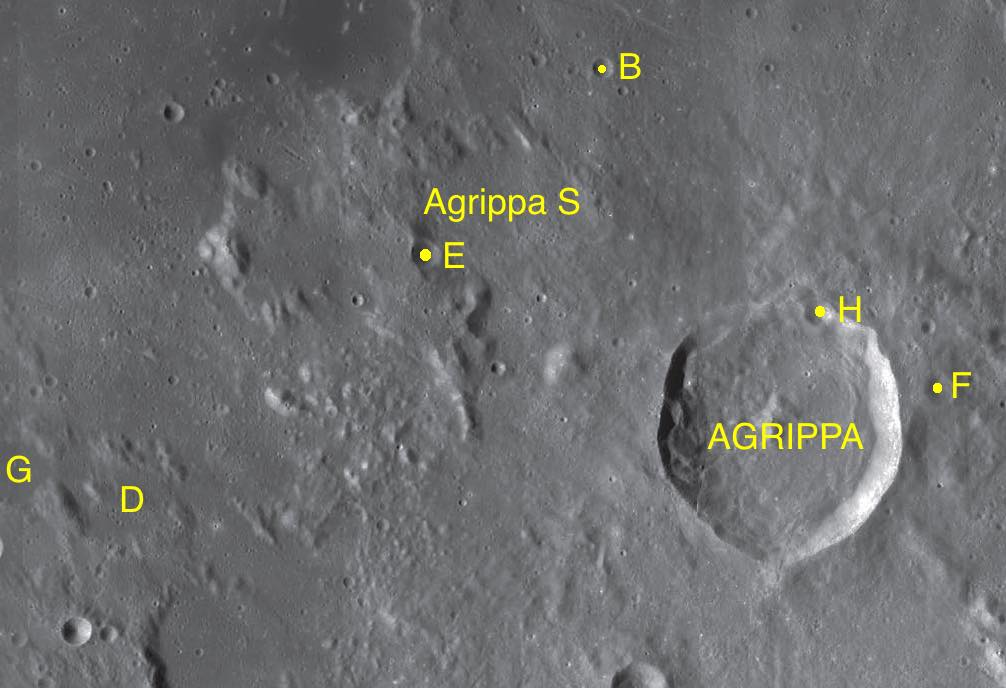
Agrippa and its satellite craters.
