= Portnancon =

Coordinates: 58.50459°N 4.68928°W

Portnacon: Scottish Gaelic: Port nan Con

- Location within the Sutherland area
- OS grid reference: NC434605
- Council area: Highland
- Lieutenancy area: Sutherland
- Country: Scotland
- Sovereign state: United Kingdom
- Post town: Lairg
- Postcode district: IV27 4
- Police: Scotland
- Fire: Scottish
- Ambulance: Scottish

Portnacon is a small remote crofting township, and former fishing station, on the west shore of Loch Eriboll in Sutherland, Scottish Highlands in the Scottish council area of Highland. The township is in the parish of Durness and Durness village lies 8 miles (13 km) west along the A838 road. The village of Laid is located 1 mile (1.6 km) south-west from Portnancon along the A838.

Only a few buildings remain of the fishing station, in Portnacon, or Port-na-con, meaning "Port of the Dogs". The fishing pier was also used by a ferry, which crossed the loch until the 1930s.
