= Heinrich Eduard von Lade =

German banker and amateur astronomer

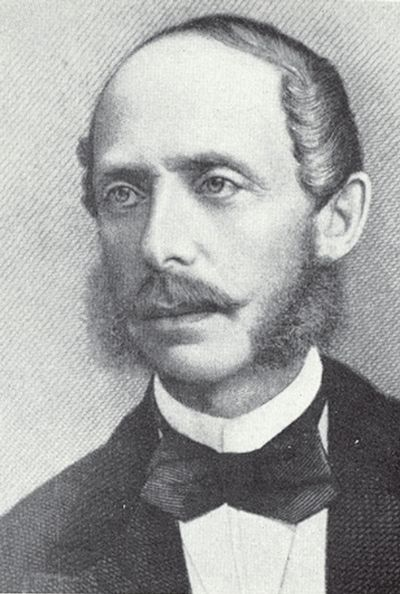
- Heinrich Eduard von Lade

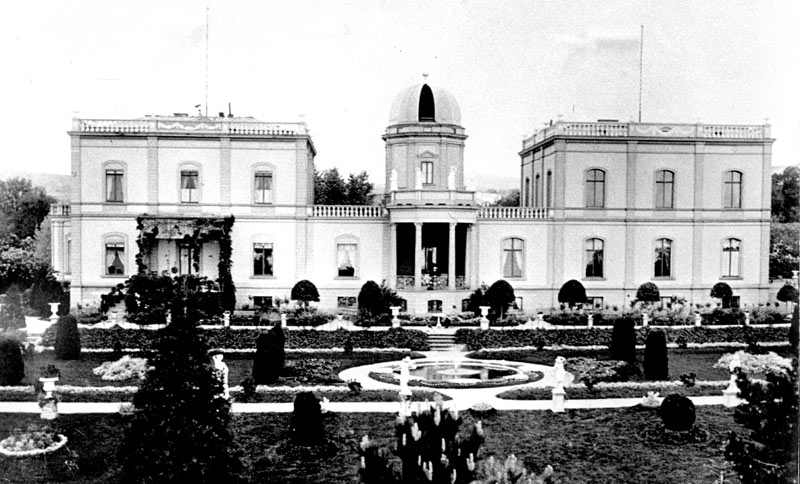
Villa Monrepos with park and observatory (1887)

Heinrich Eduard von Lade (24 February 1817 – 7 August 1904) was a German banker and amateur astronomer.

He was born in Geisenheim, located along the banks of the Rhine River, and was the son of a wealthy wine merchant. He worked as a banker and exporter in Hamburg and Paris, and by the age of 44, he had earned enough to retire.

In 1861, he built a private estate, Villa Monrepos, in Geisenheim. There, he dedicated himself to cultivating fruit and wine and established the Royal Prussian Teaching Institute for Fruit and Viticulture in 1872. He also built an observatory on the estate to pursue his interest in selenography, or mapping the Moon.

He commissioned the construction of a lunar globe, with one side in physical relief and the other with hashed relief and the crater names. This globe is now a very rare collector's item.

In 1901, he was elevated to the nobility and became a baron. He died in Geisenheim, which is still famous for its wine and the Geisenheim Grape Breeding Institute.

== Honors ==
The crater Lade on the Moon is named after him, as is the asteroid 340 Eduarda.

== Publications ==
Illustrated Handbook of Pomology

Memoirs of My Life (1888)
