= 97 Klotho =

Main-belt asteroid

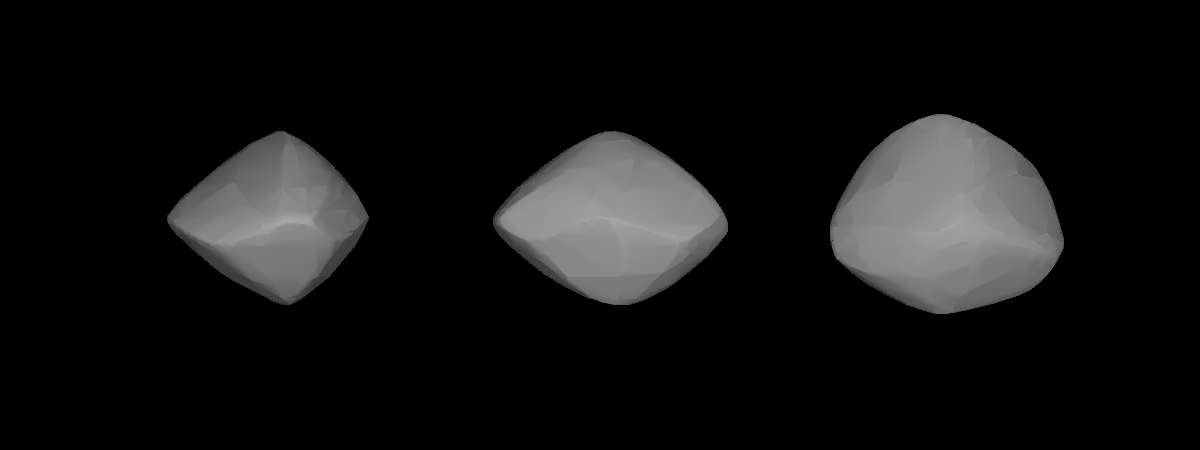
- A three-dimensional model of 97 Klotho based on its lightcurve

Discovery
- Discovered by: Ernst Wilhelm Tempel
- Discovery date: 17 February 1868

Designations
- Pronunciation: /ˈkloʊθoʊ/
- Named after: Clotho
- Minor planet category: Main belt
- Adjectives: Klothoian /kloʊˈθoʊ.iən/

Orbital characteristics
- Epoch 31 July 2016 (JD 2457600.5)
- Uncertainty parameter 0
- Observation arc: 145.72 yr (53224 d)
- Aphelion: 3.3534 AU (501.66 Gm)
- Perihelion: 1.99073 AU (297.809 Gm)
- Semi-major axis: 2.67206 AU (399.734 Gm)
- Eccentricity: 0.25498
- Orbital period (sidereal): 4.37 yr (1595.4 d)
- Average orbital speed: 17.93 km/s
- Mean anomaly: 85.0170°
- Mean motion: 0° 13^{m} 32.336^{s} / day
- Inclination: 11.783°
- Longitude of ascending node: 159.705°
- Argument of perihelion: 268.687°

Physical characteristics
- Mean diameter: 85 ± 9 km
- Mass: (1.33 ± 0.13) × 10^{18} kg
- Mean density: 4.14 ± 1.37 g/cm^{3}
- Synodic rotation period: 35.2510 h (1.46879 d)
- Pole ecliptic longitude: 359°
- Pole ecliptic latitude: 30°
- Geometric albedo: 0.2285±0.027; 0.229
- Spectral type: M (Tholen); X (Bus); Xc (DeMeo et al)
- Absolute magnitude (H): 7.63

97 Klotho is a fairly large main-belt asteroid. While it is a metallic M-type asteroid, its radar albedo is too low to allow a nickel-iron composition. Klotho is similar to 21 Lutetia and 22 Kalliope in that all three are M-types of unknown composition. Klotho was found by Ernst Tempel on February 17, 1868. It was his fifth and final asteroid discovery. It is named after Klotho or Clotho, one of the three Moirai, or Fates, in Greek mythology.

This object is orbiting the Sun at a distance of 2.67 AU with a moderate eccentricity (ovalness) of 0.25 and an orbital period of 4.37 years. Its orbital plane is inclined at an angle of 11.8° relative to the plane of the ecliptic. 13-cm radar observations of this asteroid from the Arecibo Observatory between 1980 and 1985 were used to produce a diameter estimate of 108 km.

In 1990, the asteroid was observed for four nights from the Collurania-Teramo Observatory in Italy, producing an asymmetric light curve that showed a rotation period of 10.927±0.001 hours and a brightness variation of 0.17±0.02 in magnitude. This period confirms a value independently determined in 1971.
