= Wilhelm Tempel =

German astronomer (1821–1889)

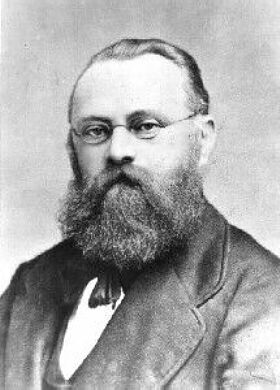
Wilhelm Tempel

Asteroids discovered: 5
64 Angelina	4 March 1861
65 Cybele	8 March 1861
74 Galatea	29 August 1862
81 Terpsichore	30 September 1864
97 Klotho	17 February 1868

Ernst Wilhelm Leberecht Tempel (4 December 1821 – 16 March 1889), normally known as Wilhelm Tempel, was a German astronomer who worked in Marseille until the outbreak of the Franco-Prussian War in 1870, then later moved to Italy.

Tempel was born at Niedercunnersdorf, Saxony. He was a prolific discoverer of comets, discovering or co-discovering 21 in all, including Comet 55P/Tempel-Tuttle, now known to be the parent body of the Leonid meteor shower, and 9P/Tempel, the target of the NASA probe Deep Impact in 2005. Other periodic comets that bear his name include 10P/Tempel and 11P/Tempel-Swift-LINEAR.

In 1861, he was awarded the Lalande Prize. He won the Prix Valz for the year 1880. The main-belt asteroid 3808 Tempel and the lunar crater Tempel are named after him.
