= Cnoc an Fhreiceadain =

Mountain on north coast of Scotland

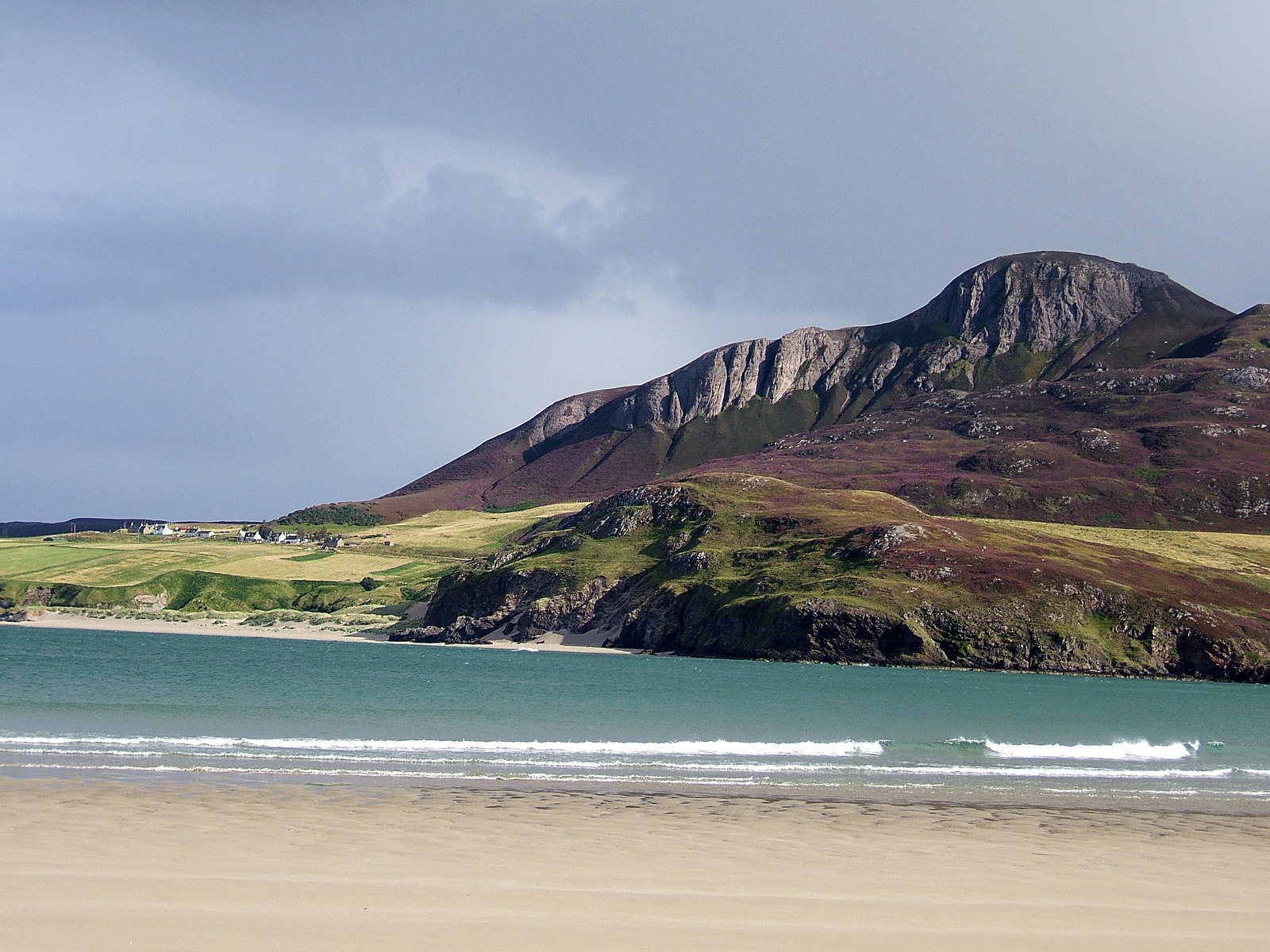
- View of Cnoc an Fhreiceadain across the Kyle of Tongue from Melness

Highest point
- Elevation: 307 m (1,007 ft)
- Coordinates: 58°30′02″N 4°23′06″W

Naming
- English translation: Hill of Watching
- Language of name: Gaelic

Geography
- Location within Scotland
- Location: Coldbackie, Sutherland, Scotland
- OS grid: NC611594
- Topo map: OS Landranger 9

Cnoc an Fhreiceadain (Hill of Watching or Watch Hill) is a coastal mountain peak in northern Scotland. It is 307 metres (1,007 ft) high with commanding views along the north coast of Scotland to Orkney in the east to Durness and Arkle in the West. It lies in the parish of Tongue with the crofting township of Coldbackie at its foot and looks across the Kyle of Tongue and Tongue Bay to the Rabbit Islands.

Cnoc an Fhreiceadain is an Old Red Sandstone conglomerate, and dates from the Paleozoic era, around 400 million years ago.

In 2004 as part of the BBC's Top Gear motoring programme, Jeremy Clarkson drove a Land Rover Discovery 3 from sea level to the summit of Cnoc an Fhreiceadain. The programme was criticised by the Mountaineering Council for Scotland for the potential impact of the climb on peat bogs and heather environments.
