= Achnahuaigh =

Coordinates: 58.54259872°N 4.44138749°W

Achnahuaigh: Achadh na h-Uamha
- Hamlet
- Location within the Sutherland area
- Language: English
- OS grid reference: NC57996419
  - Edinburgh: 184 km (114 mi) South
  - London: 514 mi (827 km) South
- Civil parish: Tongue
- Council area: Highland
- Lieutenancy area: Sutherland
- Country: Scotland
- Sovereign state: United Kingdom
- Post town: LAIRG
- Postcode district: IV27
- Dialling code: 01847
- Police: Scotland
- Fire: Scottish
- Ambulance: Scottish
- UK Parliament: Caithness, Sutherland and Easter Ross
- Scottish Parliament: Caithness, Sutherland and Ross

Achnahuaigh or Achinahuaigh (Scottish Gaelic: Achadh na h-Uamha) is a crofting hamlet and neighbourhood in the Melness area of Sutherland in the Highland council area in Northern Scotland. The hamlet is located on the minor road which passes through most of Melness including Talmine. North of the settlement, the road divides in two with one road continuing to Achininver and the other going to Midfield. Further north the Midfield spur has another road junction to Portvasgo. The settlement is located adjacent a small stream, Allt Achadh na h-Uaighe and some of its smaller tributaries all of which get their water from nearby Cnoc na Gobhar and Loch Vasgo. Achnahuaigh is located 71 metres above sea level and is surrounded by a few rural, small hiking trails
