= List of towns and villages in the Scottish Highlands =

List of town and villages in the Highlands of Scotland. This covers a wider area than just the Highland council area.

- Aberfeldy, Perth and Kinross
- Aboyne, Aberdeenshire
- Achfary, Highland
- Achachork, Highland
- Alness, Highland
- Altnaharra, Highland
- Applecross, Highland
- Arisaig, Highland
- Ardlui, Argyll and Bute, Loch Lomond and the Trossachs National Park
- Arrochar, Argyll and Bute, Loch Lomond and the Trossachs National Park
- Auchtubh, Stirling, Loch Lomond and the Trossachs National Park
- Auldearn, Highland
- Aultbea, Highland
- Aviemore, Highland, Cairngorms National Park
- Avoch, Highland
- Back of Keppoch, Highland
- Balintore, Highland
- Ballachulish, Highland
- Ballater, Aberdeenshire, Cairngorms National Park
- Balloch, Highland
- Balquhidder, Stirling, Loch Lomond and the Trossachs National Park
- Banavie, Highland
- Banchory, Aberdeenshire
- Barcaldine, Argyll and Bute
- Beauly, Highland
- Bettyhill, Highland
- Blair Atholl, Perth and Kinross, Cairngorms National Park
- Blairgowrie, Perth and Kinross
- Boat of Garten, Highland, Cairngorms National Park
- Bonar Bridge, Highland
- Braemar, Aberdeenshire, Cairngorms National Park
- Braetongue, Highland
- Bridge of Orchy, Argyll and Bute
- Campbeltown, Argyll and Bute
- Cannich, Highland
- Carrbridge, Highland, Cairngorms National Park
- Castlebay, Na h-Eileanan Siar
- Castletown, Highland
- Coldbackie, Highland
- Colintraive, Argyll and Bute
- Cammachmore, Aberdeenshire
- Conon Bridge, Highland
- Contin, Highland
- Cookney, Aberdeenshire
- Corpach, Highland
- Craighouse, Argyll and Bute
- Crieff, Perth and Kinross
- Crianlarich, Stirling, Loch Lomond and the Trossachs National Park
- Cromarty, Highland
- Culbokie, Highland
- Culloden, Highland
- Dalmally, Argyll and Bute
- Dalnaspidal, Perth and Kinross
- Dalwhinnie, Highland, Cairngorms National Park
- Dingwall, Highland
- Dornie, Highland
- Dornoch, Highland
- Doune, Stirling
- Drumbeg, Sutherland, Highland
- Drumnadrochit, Highland
- Dulnain Bridge, Highland, Cairngorms National Park
- Dunbeath, Highland
- Dunkeld, Perth and Kinross
- Dunnet, Highland
- Dunoon, Argyll and Bute
- Durness, Highland
- Elgin, Moray
- Evanton, Highland
- Edderton, Highland
- Farr, Sutherland, Highland
- Farr, Strathnairn, Highland
- Forres, Moray
- Fort Augustus, Highland
- Fortrose, Highland
- Gairloch, Highland
- Gillock, Highland
- Glencoe, Highland
- Glenelg, Highland
- Glendaruel, Argyll and Bute
- Golspie, Highland
- Grantown-on-Spey, Highland, Cairngorms National Park
- Glenfinnan, Highland
- Halkirk, Highland
- Helmsdale, Highland
- Hilton, Highland
- Inveraray, Argyll and Bute
- Inverasdale, Wester Ross
- Inverbeg, Argyll and Bute, Loch Lomond and the Trossachs National Park
- Invergordon, Highland
- Invermoriston, Highland
- Inverness
- City status in the United Kingdom, Highland
- Inveruglas, Argyll and Bute, Loch Lomond and the Trossachs National Park
- John o' Groats, Highland
- Keiss, Highland
- Killin, Stirling, Loch Lomond and the Trossachs National Park
- Kilmartin, Argyll and Bute
- Kiltarlity, Highland
- Kingussie, Highland, Cairngorms National Park
- Kinlochbervie, Highland
- Kinlocheil, Highland
- Kinlochleven, Highland
- Kinlochewe, Highland
- Kinloch Rannoch, Perth and Kinross
- Kirkhill, Highland
- Kyle of Lochalsh, Highland
- Laggan, Highland, Cairngorms National Park
- Lochailort, Highland
- Lochcarron, Highland
- Lochinver, Highland
- Lochranza, North Ayrshire
- Lochgoilhead, Argyll and Bute, Loch Lomond and the Trossachs National Park
- Lochearnhead, Stirling, Loch Lomond and the Trossachs National Park
- Lochgilphead, Argyll and Bute
- Lybster, Highland
- Mallaig, Highland
- Maryburgh, Highland
- Maryculter, Aberdeenshire
- Morar, Highland
- Muchalls, Aberdeenshire
- Muir of Ord, Highland
- Nairn, Highland
- Netherley, Aberdeenshire
- Newtonmore, Highland, Cairngorms National Park
- North Connel, Argyll and Bute
- North Ballachulish, Highland
- Nethy Bridge, Highland, Cairngorms National Park
- Oban, Argyll and Bute
- Peterculter, Aberdeenshire
- Pitlochry, Perth and Kinross
- Plockton, Highland
- Poolewe, Highland
- Portmahomack, Highland
- Reay, Highland
- Rosemarkie, Highland
- Rothes, Moray
- Scourie, Highland
- Shandwick, Highland
- Shieldaig, Highland
- South Ballachulish, Highland
- Spean Bridge, Highland
- Strathpeffer, Highland
- Strathy, Highland
- Strathyre, Stirling, Loch Lomond and the Trossachs National Park
- Strontian, Highland
- Stornoway, Na h-Eileanan Siar
- Tain, Highland
- Tarbet, Argyll and Bute, Loch Lomond and the Trossachs National Park
- Tarbert-Harris, Na h-Eileanan Siar
- Tarbert-Loch Fyne, Argyll and Bute
- Taynuilt, Argyll and Bute
- Thurso, Highland
- Tighnabruaich, Argyll and Bute
- Tobermory, Argyll and Bute
- Tomintoul, Moray, Cairngorms National Park
- Tongue, Highland
- Torridon, Highland
- Tullich, Aberdeenshire
- Tyndrum, Stirling, Loch Lomond and the Trossachs National Park
- Ullapool, Highland
- Udny Station, Aberdeenshire
- Watten, Highland
- Whaligoe, Highland
- Wick, Highland
