= Achuvoldrach =

Coordinates: 58.49291°N 4.42367°W

Achuvoldrach: Scottish Gaelic: Achadh a’ Mholltairich
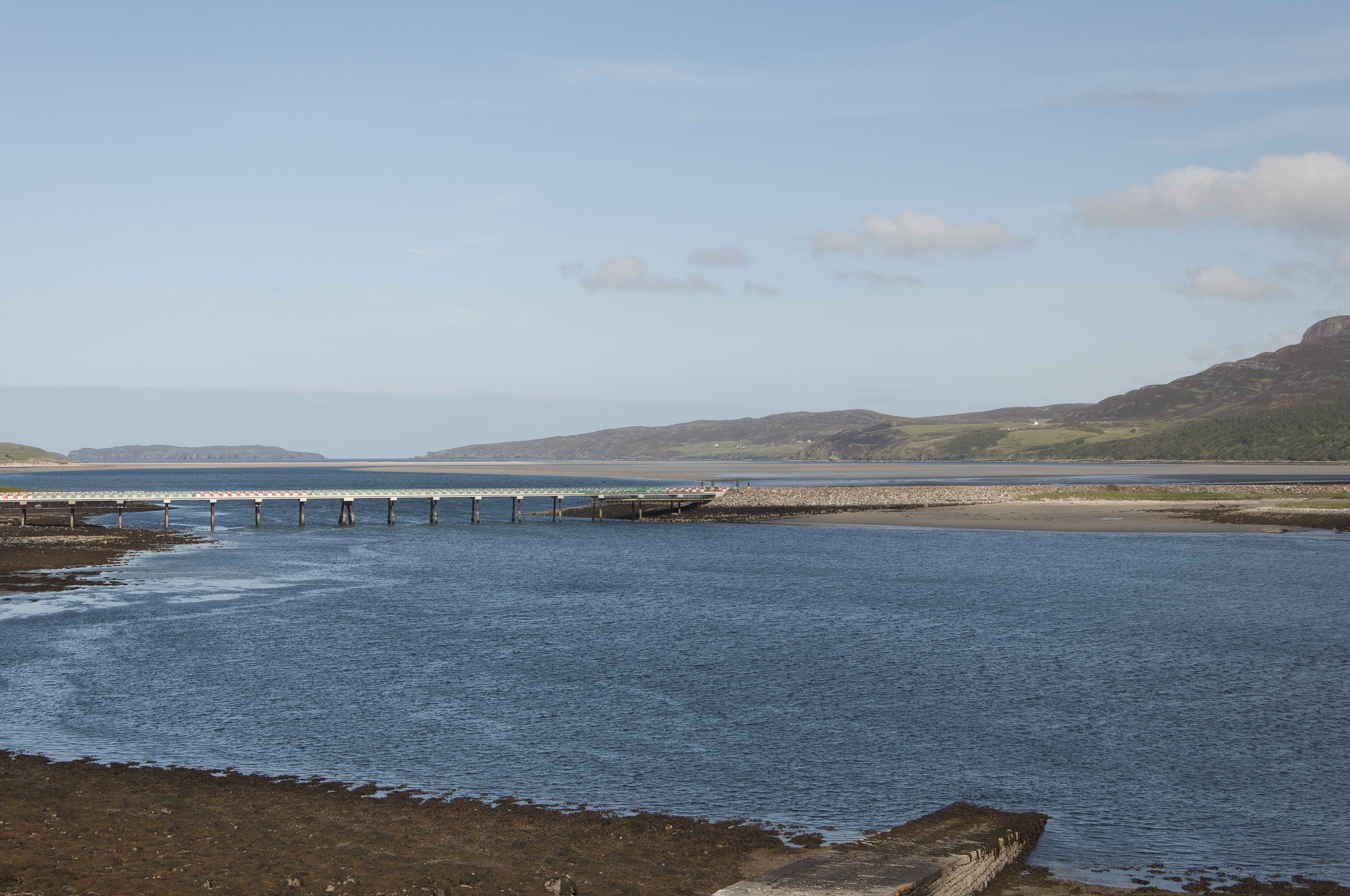
- Bridge over Kyle of Tongue from Achuvoldrach, Scotland

- Location within the Sutherland area
- OS grid reference: NC588586
- Council area: Highland
- Country: Scotland
- Sovereign state: United Kingdom
- Postcode district: IV27 4
- Police: Scotland
- Fire: Scottish
- Ambulance: Scottish
- UK Parliament: Caithness, Sutherland and Easter Ross
- Scottish Parliament: Caithness, Sutherland and Ross

Achuvoldrach (Scottish Gaelic: Achadh a’ Mholltairich) is a small remote village on the west shore of the Kyle of Tongue in Sutherland, in the Highland region of Scotland. Achuvoldrach is linked to the village of Tongue by the Kyle of Tongue Causeway across the sea loch, on a west to east orientation.

On the A838, just west of the village, stands the Achuvoldrach Standing Stone, a striking prehistoric monument steeped in folklore. While its true purpose remains unknown, theories suggest it may have served as a ceremonial site, territorial marker, or has an astronomical alignment. Predating even the Egyptian pyramids, its location was likely chosen with purpose. Today, the stone continues to intrigue researchers and visitors alike, its original purpose lost to time but its mystery enduring.
