= Skullomie =

Coordinates: 58.514°N 4.378°W

Scullomie
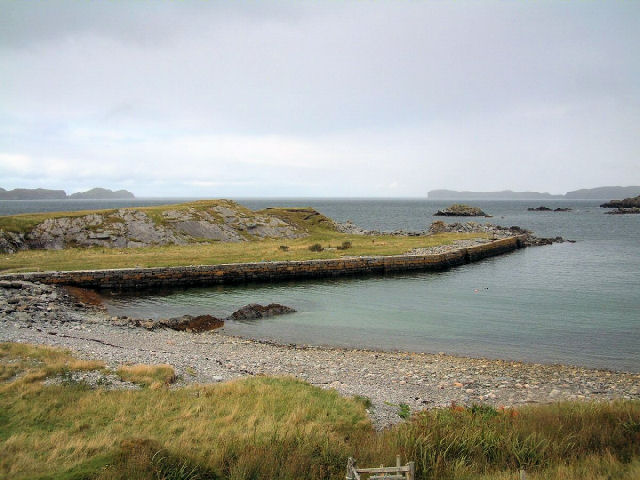
- Scullomie pier on Tongue Bay

- Location within the Sutherland area
- OS grid reference: NC615609
  - Edinburgh: 184 mi (296 km)
- Civil parish: Tongue
- Council area: Highland
- Lieutenancy area: Sutherland
- Country: Scotland
- Sovereign state: United Kingdom
- Post town: LAIRG
- Postcode district: IV27
- Dialling code: 01847

Scullomie is a small fishing and crofting township at the head of Tongue Bay in Sutherland in the Scottish Highlands. It is located around 3 miles (4.8 km) north of the village of Tongue on the northern coast of Scotland and is in the Scottish council area of Highland. The place name is spelled Skullomie on some Ordnance Survey maps.

The township lies on the eastern shore of Tongue Bay just north of the mouth of the Kyle of Tongue. Scullomie pier, a category B listed building, was built using a drystone technique. It was one of the sites from which crofters embarked on ships to locations such as America and Australia during the Highland Clearances. The Rabbit Islands are offshore around 2 miles (3.2 km) to the north. The A836 runs to the south through the township of Coldbackie.

Records from the Sutherland estate show that in 1836 the township comprised 13 crofts.
