= Skerray Bay =

Bay on the north coast of Sutherland, Highland, Scotland

Coordinates: 58.5424°N 4.3038°W

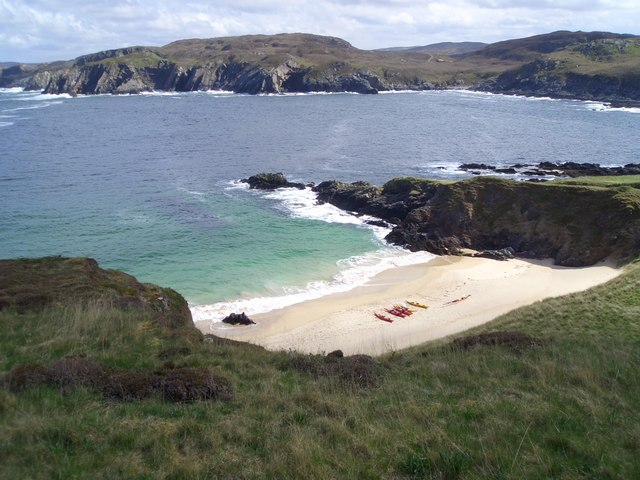
Skerray Bay and Neave Island (also known as Coomb Island).

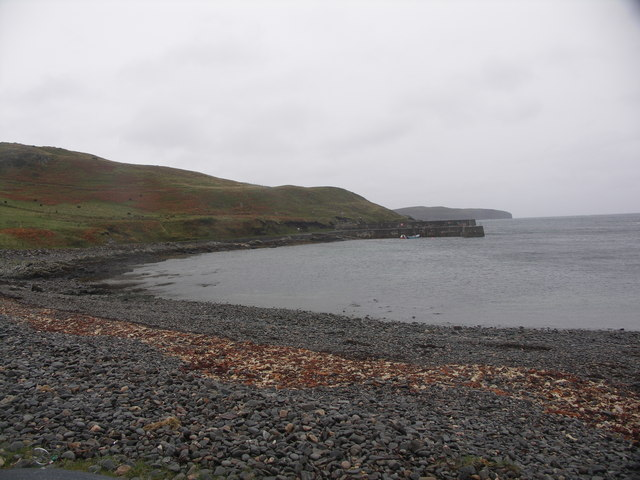
Pebble beach at Skerry Bay

Skerray Bay is an arm of the Atlantic Ocean, located on the north coast of Sutherland, Highland, Scotland. Small and rocky, it is situated to the north of Clashbuie and northwest of the crofting community of Skerray. The rock, Càrn Mòr, it at the entrance, while the channel, Caol Beag, separates Coomb Island from the mainland. Strathan Skerray - Skerray Bay is a Geological Conservation Review site. Walkers enjoy the 8 miles (13 km) Skerray Bay to Tongue trek.

== History ==
In October 1894, the Duke of Sutherland laid the foundation stone for Port Skerray. The Skerray Pier, built on the bay's rocky foreshore, was completed in 1896; and an additional entrance to the harbour was cut through a reef of rock on the east side of the bay in 1901.
