= Castle Varrich =

Castle in Scotland

Coordinates: 58°28′32.72″N 4°26′7.58″W

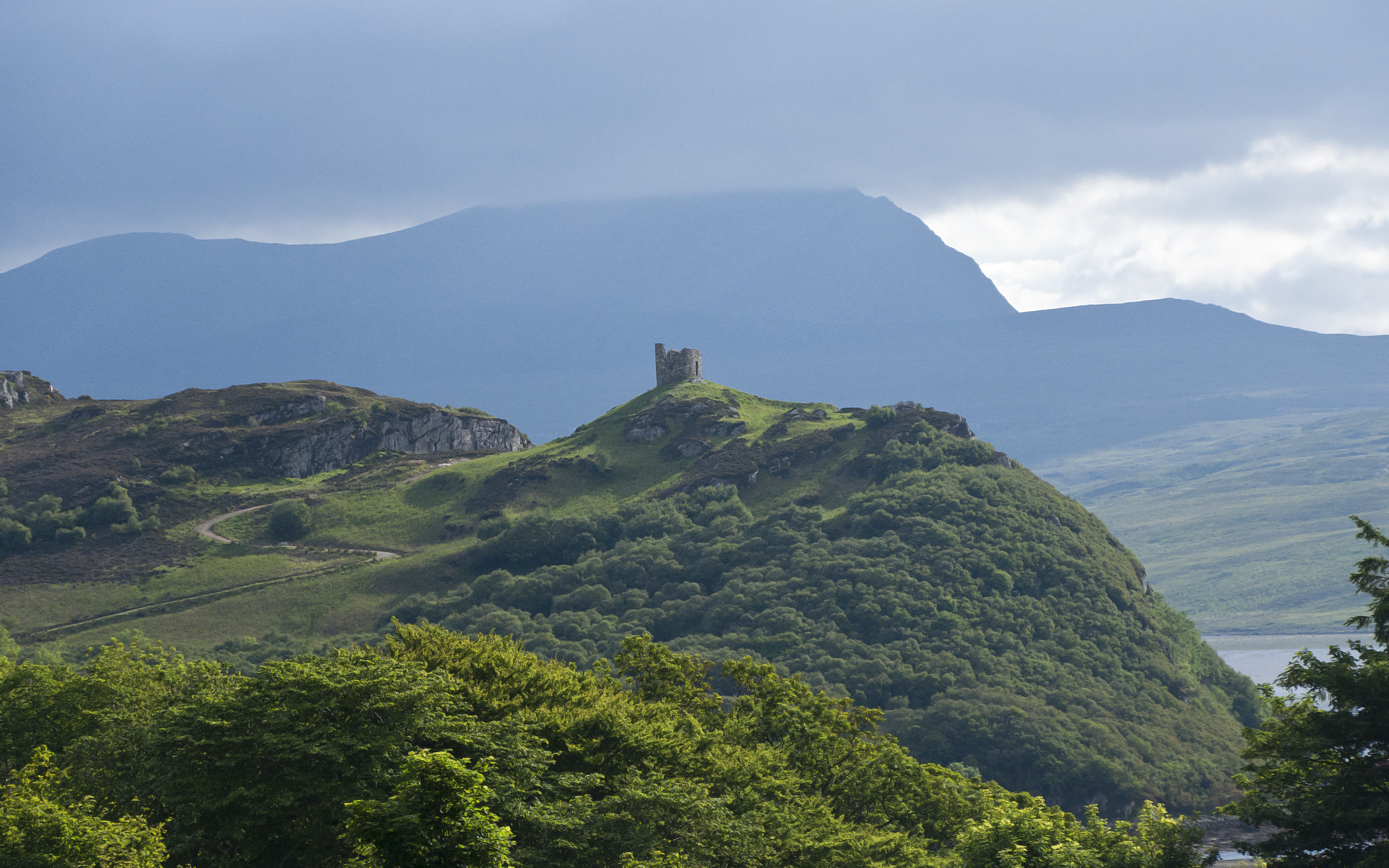
Castle Varrich

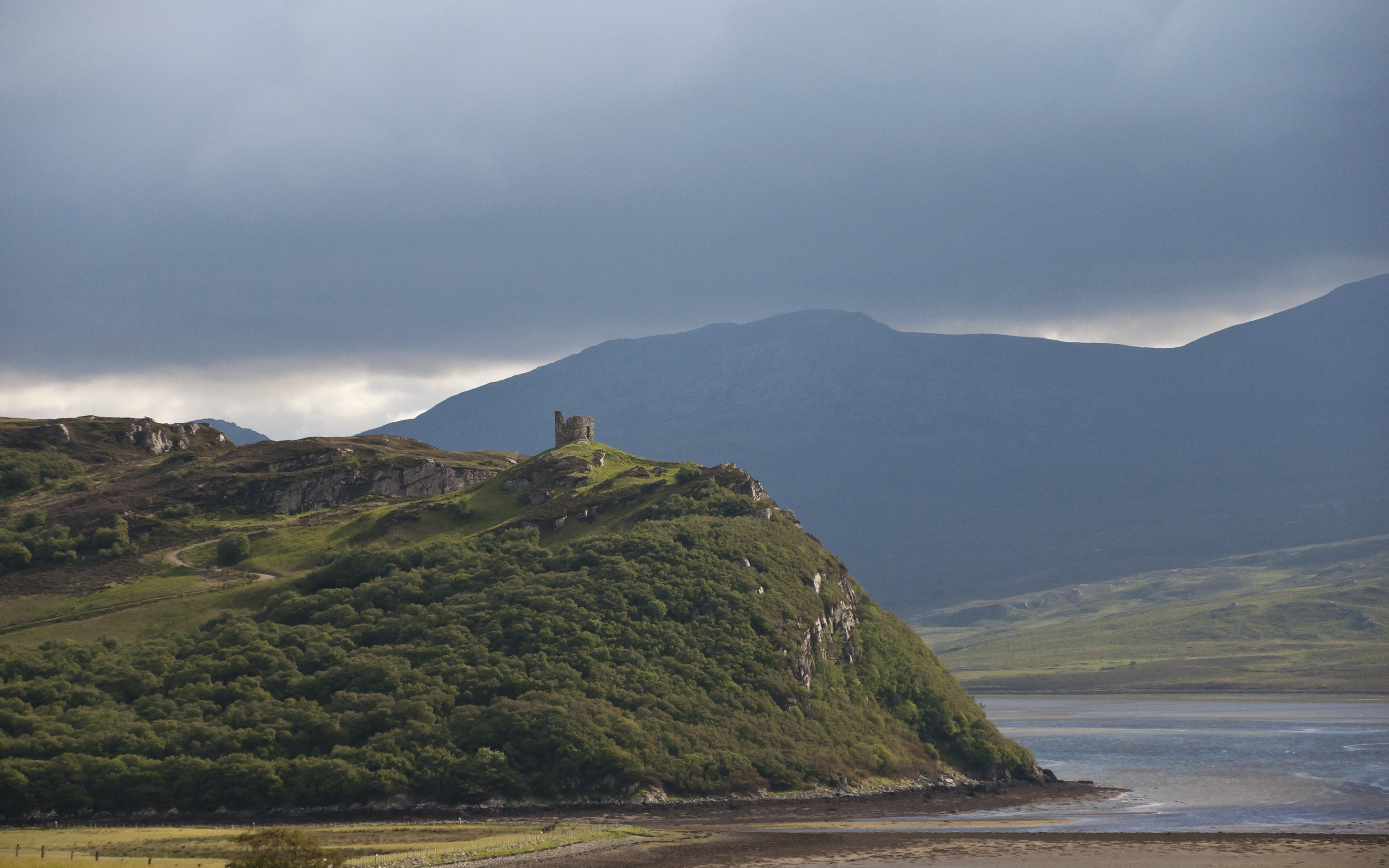
Castle Varrich

Castle Varrich (Scottish Gaelic: Caisteal Bharraich) is a castle in the far north of the Scottish Highlands, near the village of Tongue. The castle is on a local high point of rock, overlooking both the Kyle of Tongue and the village of Tongue. The castle's precise origins and age are unknown.

The ancient seat of the chief of the Clan Mackay was at Castle Varrich, thought to be over one thousand years old; there are believed to be caves under the castle which were once inhabited by the Mackays. It is believed that the Mackays may have built their castle on the site in the 14th century, on top of an existing old Norse fort.

The walls are generally 1.4 metres (5 ft) thick, or thicker, and have been built from roughly squared blocks of metamorphosed sandstone rock of varying thickness, laid in rough courses of random depth. The stones seem to have been laid without the use of mortar, and have suffered little from weathering, considering that the building may be 1000 years old, and considering the local weather. From places where parts of the walls have fallen away it appears that the construction seen on the wall faces is consistent throughout their thickness; as distinct from the type of walling where the faces have been constructed in a tidy fashion, but between them is a core of rubble.

The castle had two floors plus an attic. The ground floor may have been used as stables; it was entered through an existing door on the north wall. There were no stairs between the two floors, suggesting that the ground floor was for horses or cattle. The upper floor entrance was on the south side and would most likely have been accessed by a ladder or removable stair. There was a window in the east wall and a fireplace in the west, but both have now collapsed past recognition. Later the clan chief's seat moved to Tongue House. There is a marked footpath from Tongue to Varrich Castle.

Varrich Castle has views of mountains Ben Loyal and Ben Hope.

The castle was updated in 2017 to make it more accessible with a galvanised steel spiral staircase and viewing platform inside allowing visitors a higher viewpoint over the Kyle of Tongue.
