= Skerray =

Coordinates: 58.53287°N 4.3008°W

Skerray: Scottish Gaelic: Sgeirea
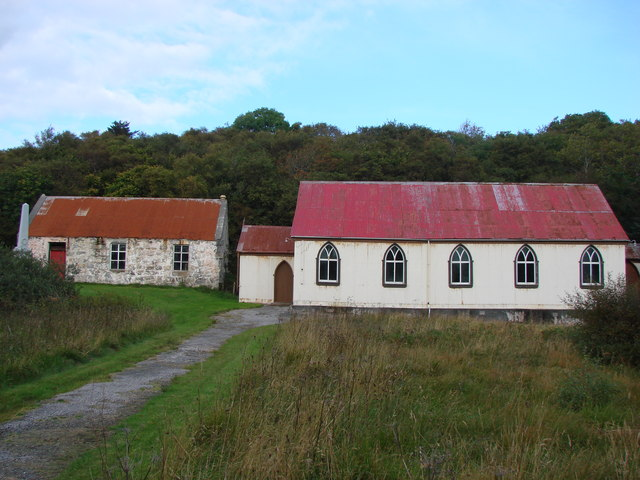
- Skerray Free Church

- Location within the Sutherland area
- OS grid reference: NC661628
- Council area: Highland
- Lieutenancy area: Sutherland
- Country: Scotland
- Sovereign state: United Kingdom
- Post town: THURSO
- Postcode district: KW14
- Dialling code: 01641
- Police: Scotland
- Fire: Scottish
- Ambulance: Scottish
- UK Parliament: Caithness, Sutherland and Easter Ross
- Scottish Parliament: Caithness, Sutherland and Ross

Skerray (Scottish Gaelic: Sgeirea) is a remote small crofting hamlet and fishing port on the north coast of Sutherland, Scotland. It is located 7 3/4 miles (12.5 kilometres) by road northeast of Tongue and 40 1/4 miles (65 kilometres) by road west of Thurso. Skerray is home to a community of artists and a group of tree planters.

== Geography ==
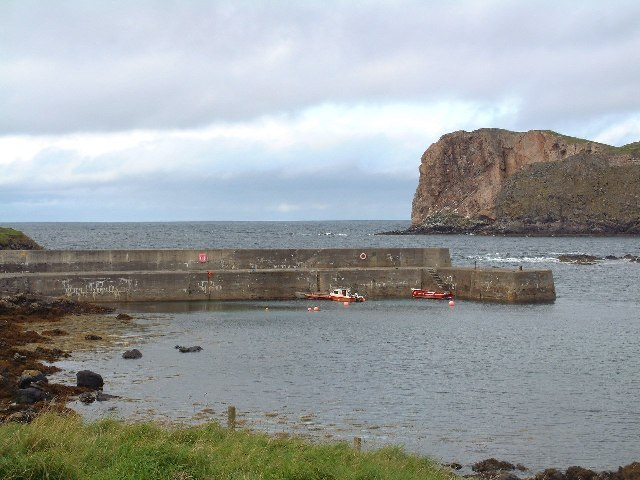
Skerray harbour

Skerray, whose name means "between the rocks and the sea", is so called because it is situated on a rocky promontory on the Atlantic Ocean between Tongue to the southwest and Bettyhill to the east. There is an additional location called Skerray one mile (1.5 kilometres) to the west. The community is located north of the A836 road from Tongue. The nearest local airport and main line rail station are at Wick and Thurso.

Skerray is the main village in "Mackay Country", historically attributed to Clan Mackay. There are 11 townships in the community, Torrisdale, Achtoty, Lotts, Clashaidy, Clashlevan, Achnabat, Clashbuie, Modsary, Lamigo, Strathanbeg, Strathan, and Slettel, now deserted. To the south are the lakes of Lochan Modsane, Loch na Coit, Lochan nam Burag, Lochan an Tigh-choimhid and Loch Skerray, with Lochan Ruadh to the southwest. Just off the coast of Skerray Bay are Neave Island and Eilean nan Ròn to the northwest.

Skerray Bay contains a small harbour and pier. The harbour, situated west of Melvich, has a natural rocky ridge, open to the north. The foundation stone for Port Skerray was laid in October 1894 by the Duke of Sutherland. The Skerray stream, Strathskerray, is approximately three miles (five kilometres) in length and empties at the sea.

== Economy ==
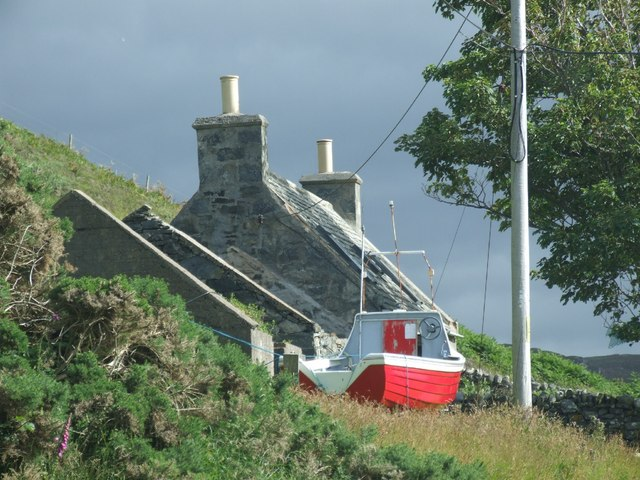
Cottage on the road to Skerray harbour

The Skerray economy, historically based on crofting and fishing, saw dramatic changes in its population, which fell from 500 in 1926 to around 100 by the 1980s. In the late 19th century, the North Sea Pilot noted that, "At Skerray, Isle Roan, and Torrisdale, 25 boats and 120 men and boys are employed in the fisheries." Skerray has been a crofting community, though with the decline of crofting in this area, dwellings are expected to be converted to holiday homes. A five-year Scottish National Heritage research project that began in 1994 gave some of Skerry's crofters the opportunity to participate in an agricultural and environmental management study in exchange for annual payments. A group of artists live and work in Skerray, as well as the A' Chraobh ("The Tree") Group which planted the Millennium Forest at Borgie. The economy has expanded to include tourism.

== Landmarks ==
Skerray has a small shop, Jimson's, with an incorporated post office. The main store closed in the early 1960s. The adjacent building to Jimson's is now home to a small art gallery featuring art work from local artists. The hamlet also contains Skerray Village Hall. The main church in Skerray is the Free Church (in the hamlet of Achtoty) and, as of 1988, it was reported to be "just about surviving, having had no minister for four years" but has fallen into a ruined state of repair.

== Education ==
A parochial schoolhouse was built in Skerray in 1836. While primary education remains local, secondary education is provided at Farr High School in Bettyhill.

== Tourism ==
Musical groups from other countries perform in the community hall. Cliffs and inlets along the coastline are explored by sea kayaking enthusiasts.
