= Rabbit Islands, Scotland =

Group of three uninhabited small islands off the coast of Sutherland, Scotland

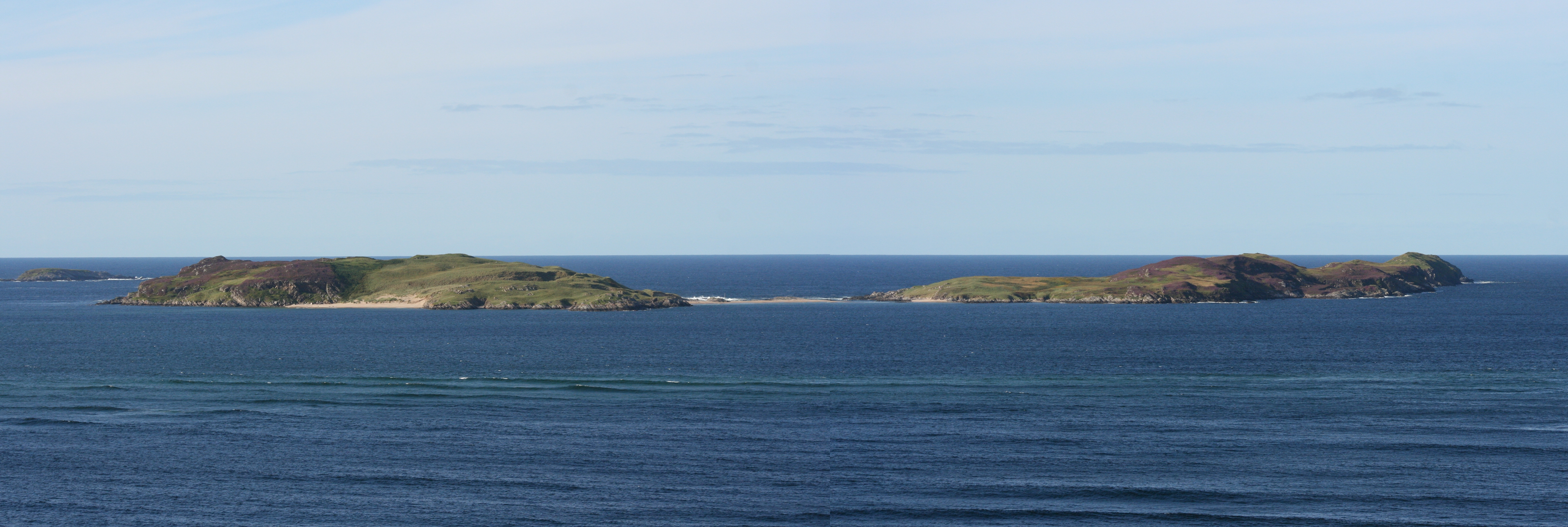
Rabbit Islands

The Rabbit Islands (58.53°N 04.40°W NC602631) are a group of three uninhabited small islands off the north coast of Sutherland, Scotland in Tongue Bay. In Scottish Gaelic, and occasionally in English, they are known as Eileanan nan Gall, which is sometimes anglicised as "Eilean-na-Gaeil" or "Eilean nan Gaill".

== Geography and geology ==
The islands' modern name derives from their sandy soil, which favours rabbit burrows and makes their presence particularly obvious, although the rabbit population had been reduced by myxomatosis as of 2016. They are fairly low lying, slender in shape, and along with the surrounding fjard of Tongue Bay, they show the effects of former glaciation. They are made up of sandstone.

The northernmost of the group is called Sgeir an Òir, and there is a natural arch at its north end called "Claigeann na Sgeir" (Bell of the Skerry). The southwestern island is linked to the central island by a tidal sand spit. A second spit extends to the mainland, but is only exposed at low spring tides.

They are near Coldbackie, Melness and Talmine on the mainland, and Eilean nan Ròn is to the north east. They are in the parish of Tongue.

== History ==
The islands' older name "Eileanan nan Gall", means "islands of the strangers", or "Norsemen".

Supposedly, a ship carrying gold to Charles Edward Stuart was wrecked on the island. The name Sgeir an Òir (skerry of the gold) may be a reference to this.

The islands are popular with scuba divers, and have in the past been used for grazing.

== See also ==
- List of islands of Scotland
- List of outlying islands of Scotland
