= Kinloch Lodge =

Private lodge in Scotland

Coordinates: 58.4329°N 4.4811°W

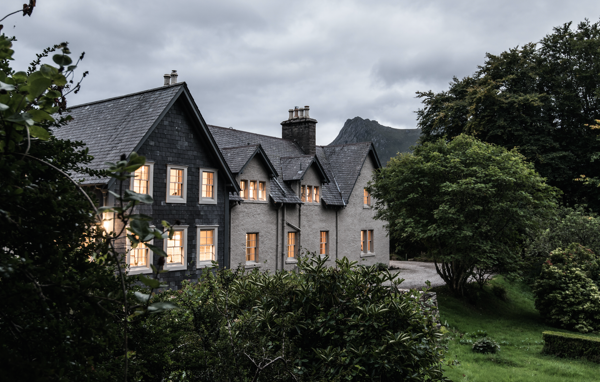
Kinloch Lodge

Kinloch Lodge, first opened in 1897, was once the private lodge of the Duke of Sutherland, and is situated near the village of Tongue in Sutherland, Scotland.

== Background ==
It was sold in 1919 as part of the massive land disposal by the Duke of Sutherland at the end of the Great War. The Kinloch Estate extends to nearly 20,000 acres and rises from sea level at the Kyle of Tongue to over 3,000 feet on Ben Hope, the most northerly Munro.

The lodge was created as a classical Scottish sporting and hunting estate and is now renovated and transformed into a hotel.

In 2011, it was bought and renovated by a Danish businessman Anders Holch Povlsen. Kinloch is a part of Wildland Ltd which is one of the biggest nature conservation projects in the Scottish Highlands.

In May 2025, the lodge and its outbuilding were named as one of the winners of the annual Royal Incorporation of Architects in Scotland (RIAS) awards, and thereby longlisted for the RIAS Best Building in Scotland Award. The judges said that the buildings had been "lovingly, painstakingly and respectfully restored exactly as they were found, using traditional methods and materials".
