= Eilean nan Ròn =

Island known for grey seals in Highland, Scotland

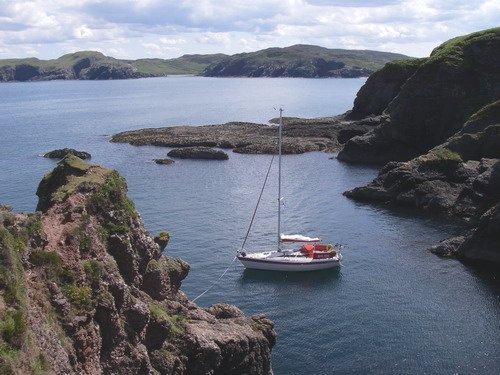
- Yacht moored in Port na h-Uaille, Eilean nan Ròn

Location
- Eilean nan Ròn shown within Highland Scotland
- OS grid reference: NC637656
- Coordinates: 58.55°N 4.34°W

Physical geography
- Island group: Highland / Islands of Sutherland
- Area: 138 hectares (9/16 sq mi)
- Area rank: 129=
- Highest elevation: Cnoc an Loisgein, 76 m (249 ft)

Administration
- Council area: Highland Council
- Country: Scotland
- Sovereign state: United Kingdom

Demographics
- Population: 0

Eilean nan Ròn (Gaelic for "island of the seals") or Roan Island is an island near Skerray, in the north of Sutherland, Scotland. An estimated 350 seal pups are born here annually.

== History ==
Eilean nan Ròn was populated for many years. 73 people lived there in 1881 and 30 in 1931 but it has been uninhabited since 1938. The final evacuation list contained nine people from the Mackay family – Christina Bella Mackay, Hector Sinclair Mackay, Jessie Ann Mackay, Willie John Mackay, Hugh Campbell Mackay, Donald Mackay, Ina Mackay, Chrissie Dolina Mackay and Christina Mackay.

The ruins of a settlement can be seen from the Skerray and in the waist of the island, between Mol na Coinnle ("pebble beach of the candles") and Mol Mòr ("big pebble beach").

The Annual Reports of the Fishery Board for Scotland provide an insight into the state of fishing from Eilean nan Ròn in the years before the First World War.

Fishery Statistics

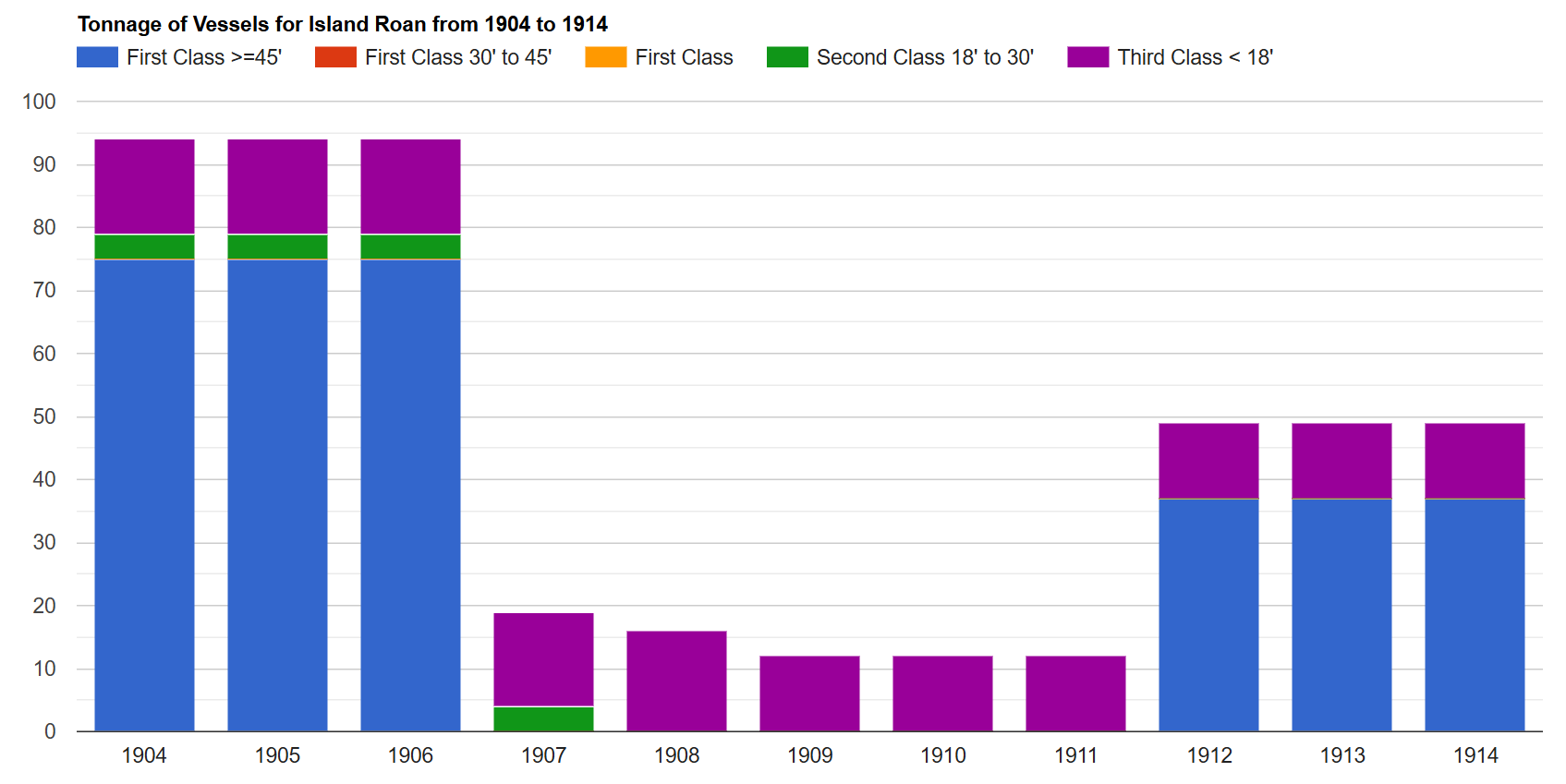
Tonnage of vessels

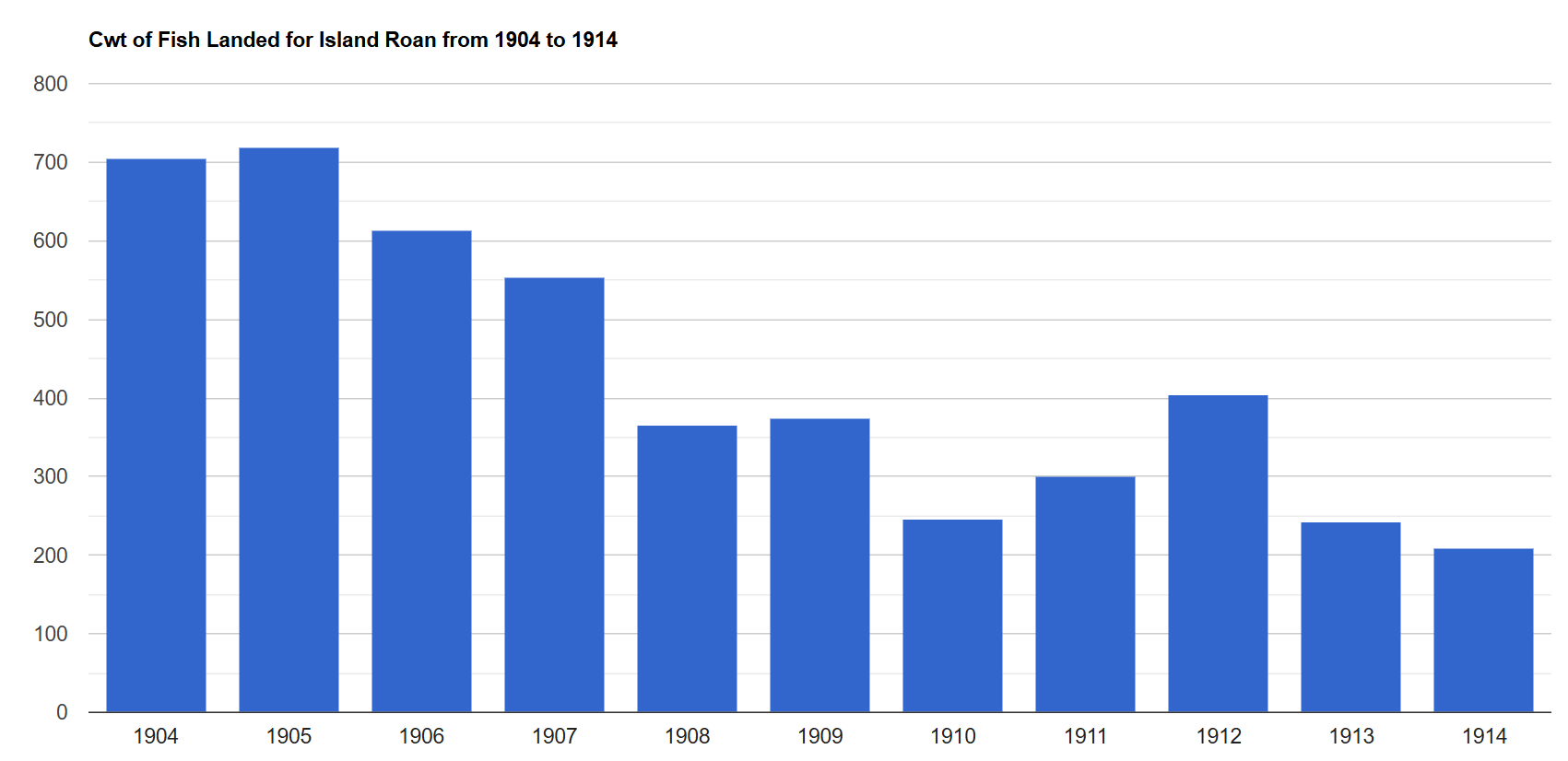
Cwt of fish landed

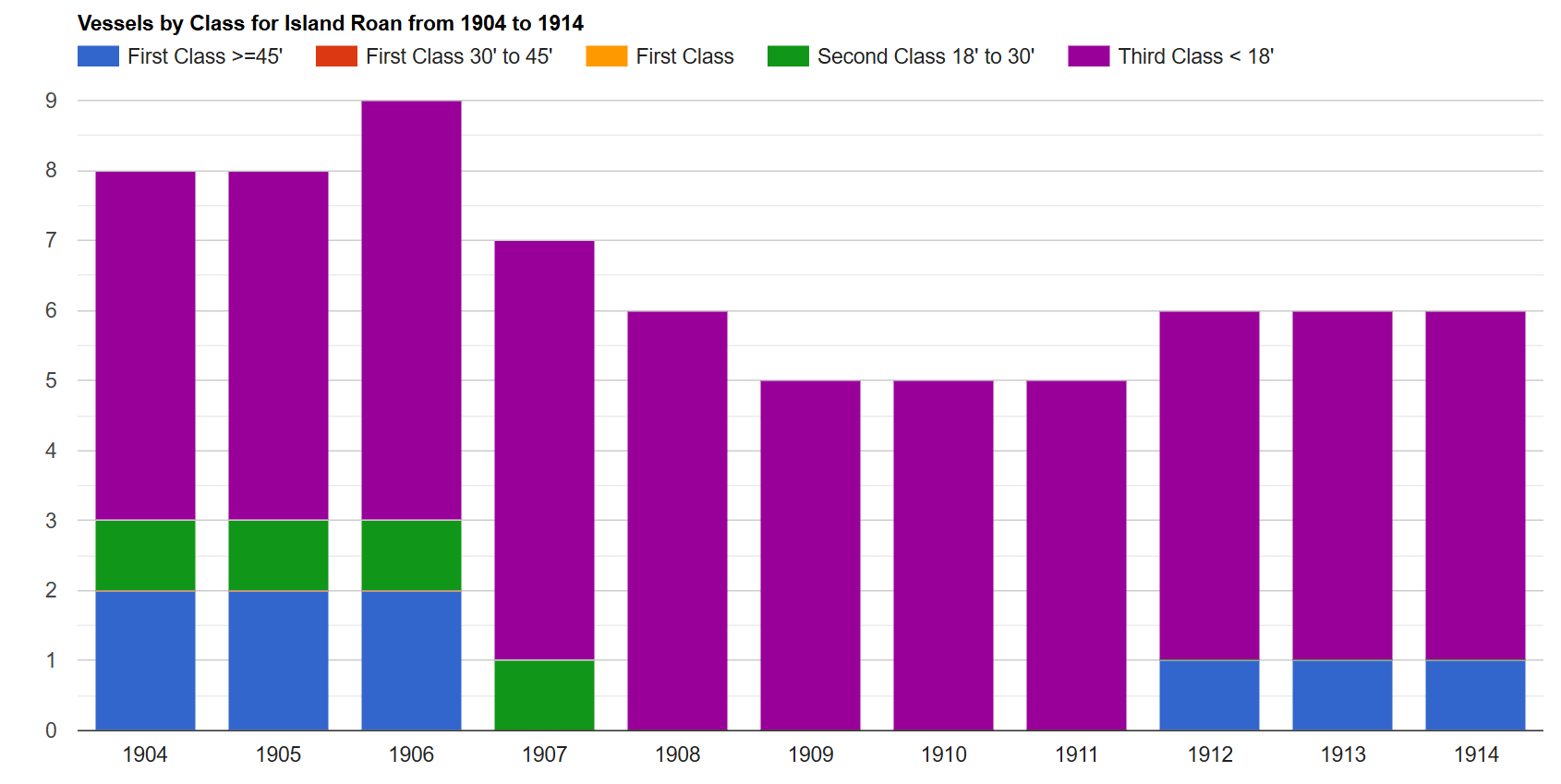
Vessels by class

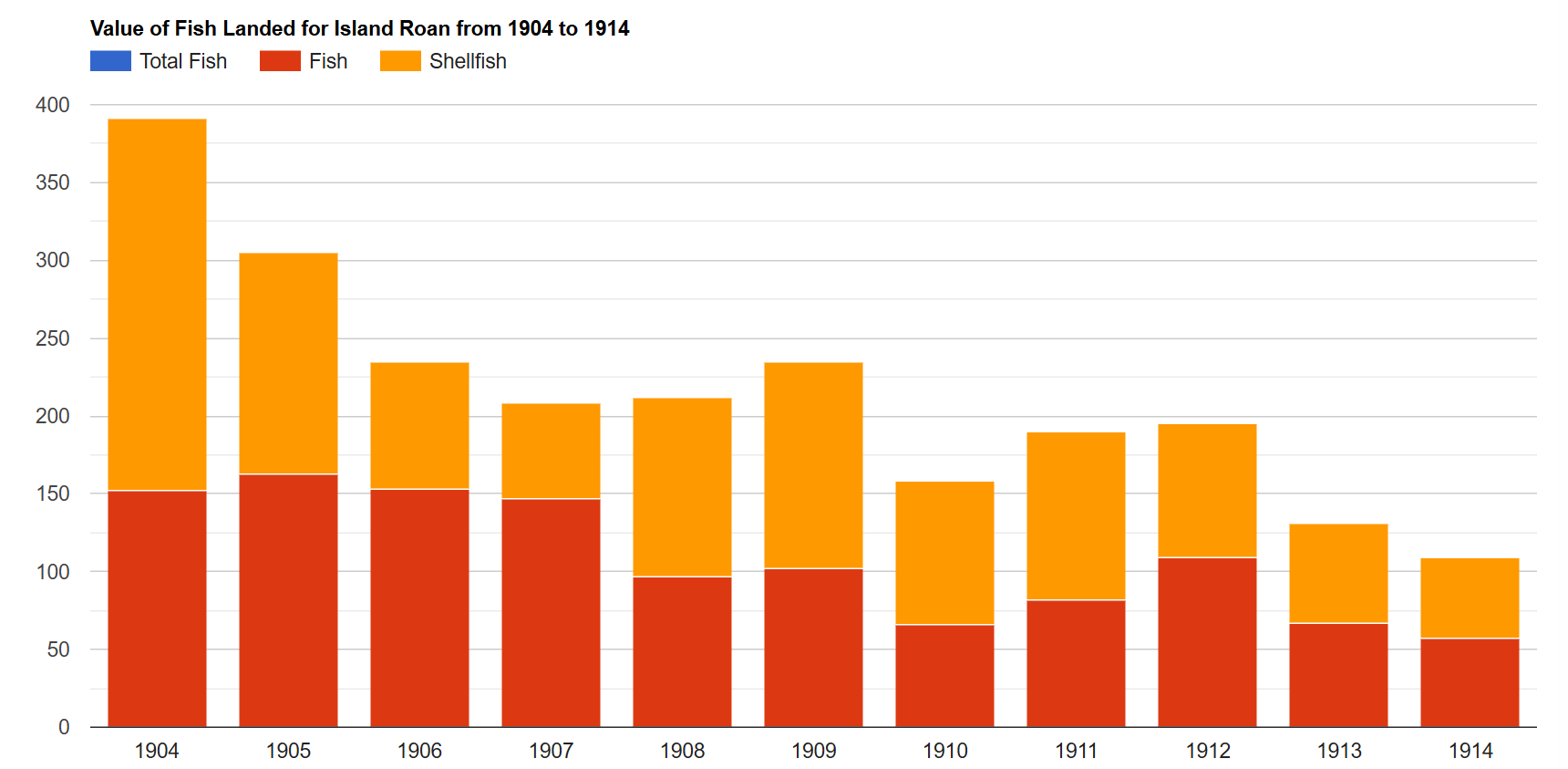
Value (£) of fish landed

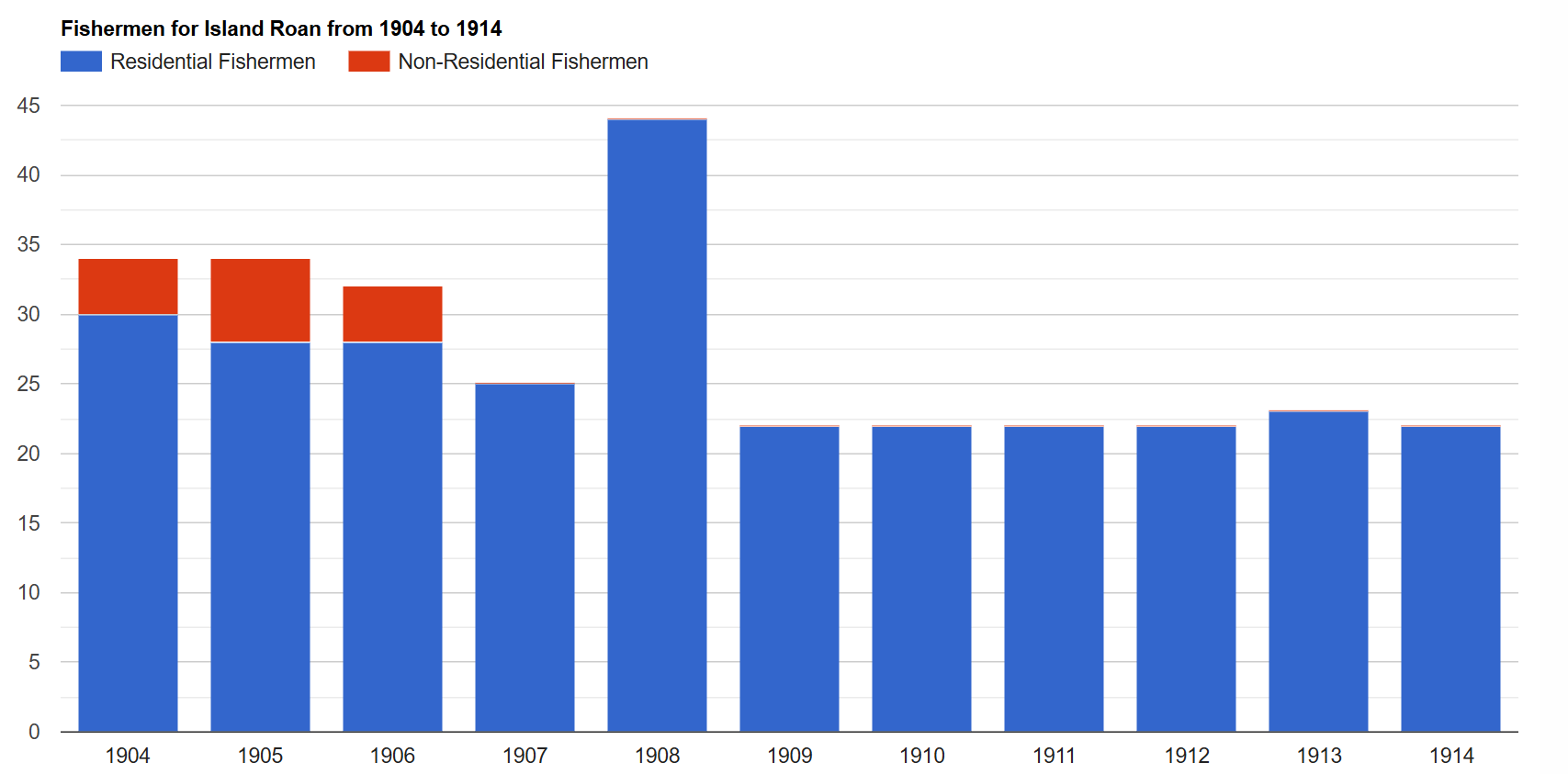
Fishermen

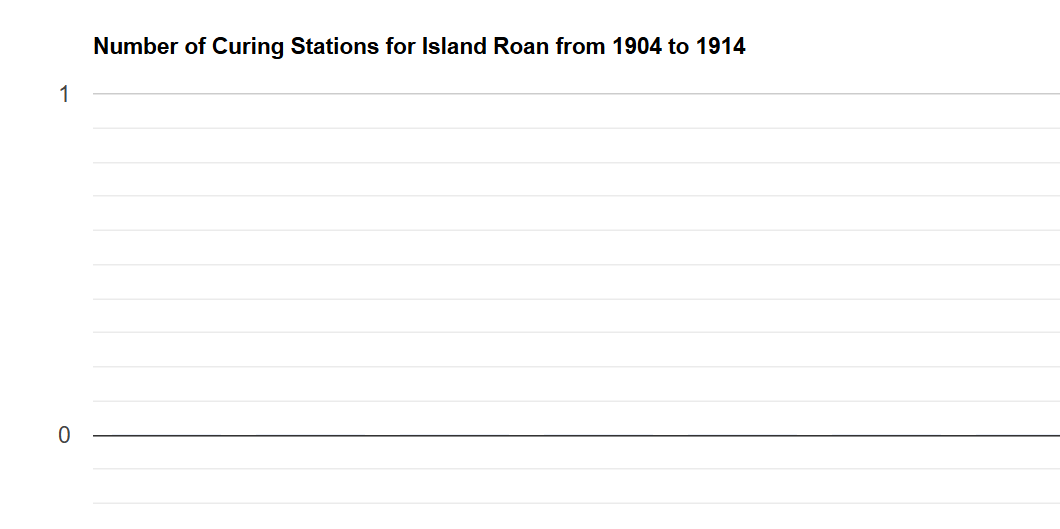
Placeholder - no curing stations

The report for 1904 states that "The fishermen on this island are very persevering. Two crews follow the herring fishing all the year round. There is a good increase in the quality and value of fish landed." The principal kinds of fish landed were haddocks, flounders and lobsters.

== Geography and geology ==
Eilean nan Ròn is not one of the Hebrides, which lie off the west coast of mainland Scotland. The island is mainly sandstone with steep cliffs on the north and east coasts and a natural arch at Leathad Ballach, which is 150 ft (46 m) high, and 70 ft (21 m) wide. The high points are Cnoc an Loisgein at 76 m (249 ft), and Cnoc na Caillich at 75 m (246 ft). As Rev. Wilson wrote in 1882:

It looks like two islands, is mostly engirt with high precipitous rocks, includes a low tract of very fertile soil.

There are several islets and islands off Eilean nan Ròn. These include the tidal Eilean Iosal ("low island"), and beyond it Meall Thailm (or Meall Holm). To the southwest is the dully named An Innis ("the island"). The Rabbit Islands are in Tongue Bay to the southwest. Neave Island is also nearby.

== Wildlife ==
As the name implies, Eilean nan Ròn is popular with grey seals, that come here in their hundreds each autumn to pup. About 350 calves are born each year. The island also has large numbers of seabirds, and sheep, which were left when the Island was evacuated. The island is designated a Site of Special Scientific Interest by NatureScot. It is also part of the North Sutherland Coastal Islands Special Protection Area (SPA) due to the presence of the barnacle goose.

== Media Coverage ==
The island was subject of a BBC news report in 2024, when a BBC reporter traced his family history to the island and subsequently visited it.

== See also ==
- List of islands of Scotland
- List of outlying islands of Scotland
