= Coldbackie =

Coordinates: 58.506°N 4.382°W

Coldbackie: Scottish Gaelic: Callbacaidh
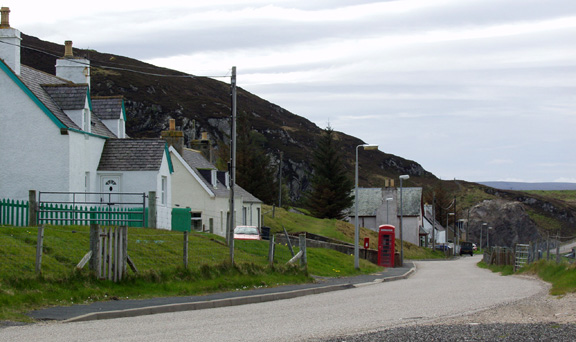
- Coldbackie by Tongue

- Location within the Sutherland area
- OS grid reference: NC613599
  - Edinburgh: 183 mi (295 km)
- Civil parish: Tongue
- Council area: Highland
- Lieutenancy area: Sutherland
- Country: Scotland
- Sovereign state: United Kingdom
- Post town: LAIRG
- Postcode district: IV27
- Dialling code: 01847

Coldbackie (Scottish Gaelic: Callbacaidh) is a crofting township in Sutherland and is in the Scottish council area of Highland Scotland.

== Geography ==
Coldbackie lies at the mouth of the Kyle of Tongue, two miles (three kilometres) northeast of Tongue. It sits under Cnoc an Fhreiceadain (the Watch Hill), looking north across Tongue Bay to the Rabbit Islands. It is one of a series of townships, running from Tongue along the A836 to Blandy. The township of Scullomie is one mile (1.5 kilometres) to the north.

== Etymology ==
The name Coldbackie could have old Norse or Gaelic roots. The place name Coldbackie is not unique to the Kyle of Tongue, with there being two Coldbacks in Shetland (in Unst and Delting) and one in north west Iceland, both areas where Norse roots would be more likely. Omand, in The Sutherland book, translates Coldbackie as kula-bakki, bank with the bump, whilst Stewart, in Place names of Shetland says that Coldbacks is Cold Hill.
