= Midfield, Highland =

Coordinates: 58°32′58″N 4°26′26″W

Midfield: Scottish Gaelic: Pàirce Meadhanach
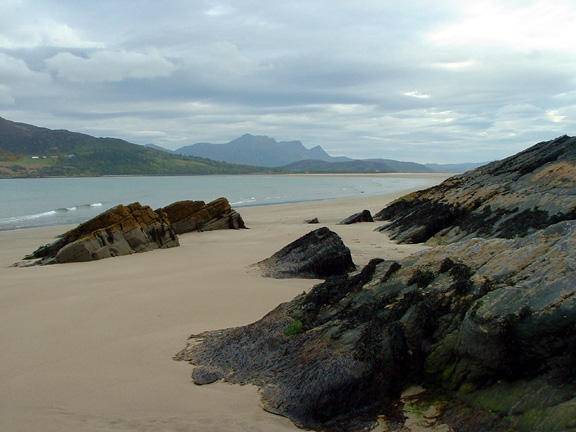
- Beach near Midfield

- Location within the Sutherland area
- OS grid reference: NC585636
- Civil parish: Durness
- Council area: Highland
- Lieutenancy area: Sutherland
- Country: Scotland
- Sovereign state: United Kingdom
- Post town: Lairg
- Postcode district: IV27 4
- Police: Scotland
- Fire: Scottish
- Ambulance: Scottish
- UK Parliament: Caithness, Sutherland and Easter Ross
- Scottish Parliament: Caithness, Sutherland and Ross

Midfield is a remote hamlet on the north coast of Scotland in Sutherland in the Highland Council Area. It is a mile south of Tormade Point and just over a mile north of Talmine and the Achininver Beach and said location's Lodge are located within Midfield. Midfield is 4 miles from the A838 and 5 miles from the larger settlement of Tongue. Midfield is also labelled as a crofting settlement according to the Gazetteer for Scotland. Midfield is a part of the Melness area.

== Access ==
The settlement is far away from most decently sized streets and towns, with the nearest big road being the A9 nearly 40 miles away. The only access to the hamlet is by a small road that links to the A838 and passes through Melness and Talmine; despite being on the coast, there is no proper nearby port access, with Port Vasgo within the hamlet not being anything more than a mere tourist attraction.

== Etymology ==
The name comes from basic English, quite literally meaning the middle of a field. Although potentially written as Middlefield at first, over time it would've been shortened to Midfield. Meanwhile, Achininver, the name of the nearby beach, comes from the Scottish Gaelic word Inbhir, which means the mouth of a river, meaning the mouth of the River Achin. Unlike most town names in Scotland named after the river they sit on the mouth of such as Inverness, the word Inver comes after the river name.
