= Braetongue =

Coordinates: 58.48032°N 4.41126°W

Braetongue (Scottish Gaelic: Bràigh Thunga) is an area in northern Sutherland just north of the town of Tongue (grid ref. NC595572). Runrig mentions the "hills about Brae Tongue" in the song The Summer Walkers.
