= Talmine, Sutherland =

Coordinates: 58.52983°N 4.43032°W

Talmine: Scottish Gaelic: Tealamainn
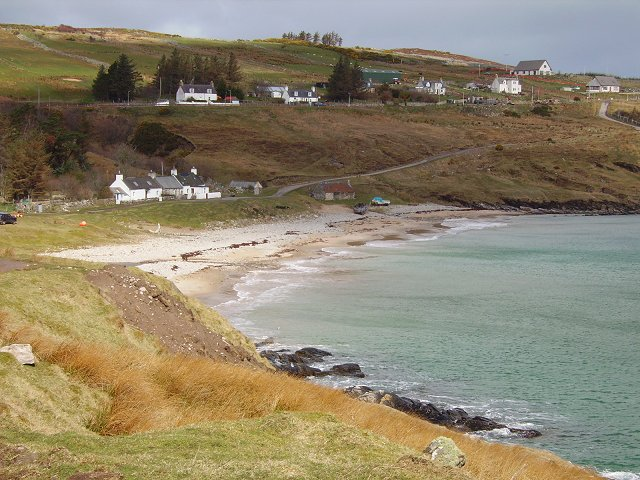

- Location within the Sutherland area
- OS grid reference: NC585627
- Council area: Highland
- Lieutenancy area: Sutherland
- Country: Scotland
- Sovereign state: United Kingdom
- Post town: Lairg
- Postcode district: IV27 4
- Police: Scotland
- Fire: Scottish
- Ambulance: Scottish

Talmine is a crofting and fishing township, overlooking Talmine Bay, an inlet on the western shore of Tongue Bay in northern Sutherland, Scottish Highlands and is in the Scottish council area of Highland. The Reaper, an old fishing boat located within the bay. She can be seen in the photo to the right, on the beach, underneath/between the stone building and blue car roughly centre image.

The township is located 2 miles from the nearest main road, the A838 and is about 4 miles from Tongue, the nearest decently sized town. It is located directly north of Midtown and Directly South of Midfield and Achininver.

== Fishing ==
The Annual Reports of the Fishery Board for Scotland provide an insight into the state of fishing from Talmine and Portvasgo in the years before the First World War. Catches consisted of herrings haddocks and lobsters.

Fishery Statistics

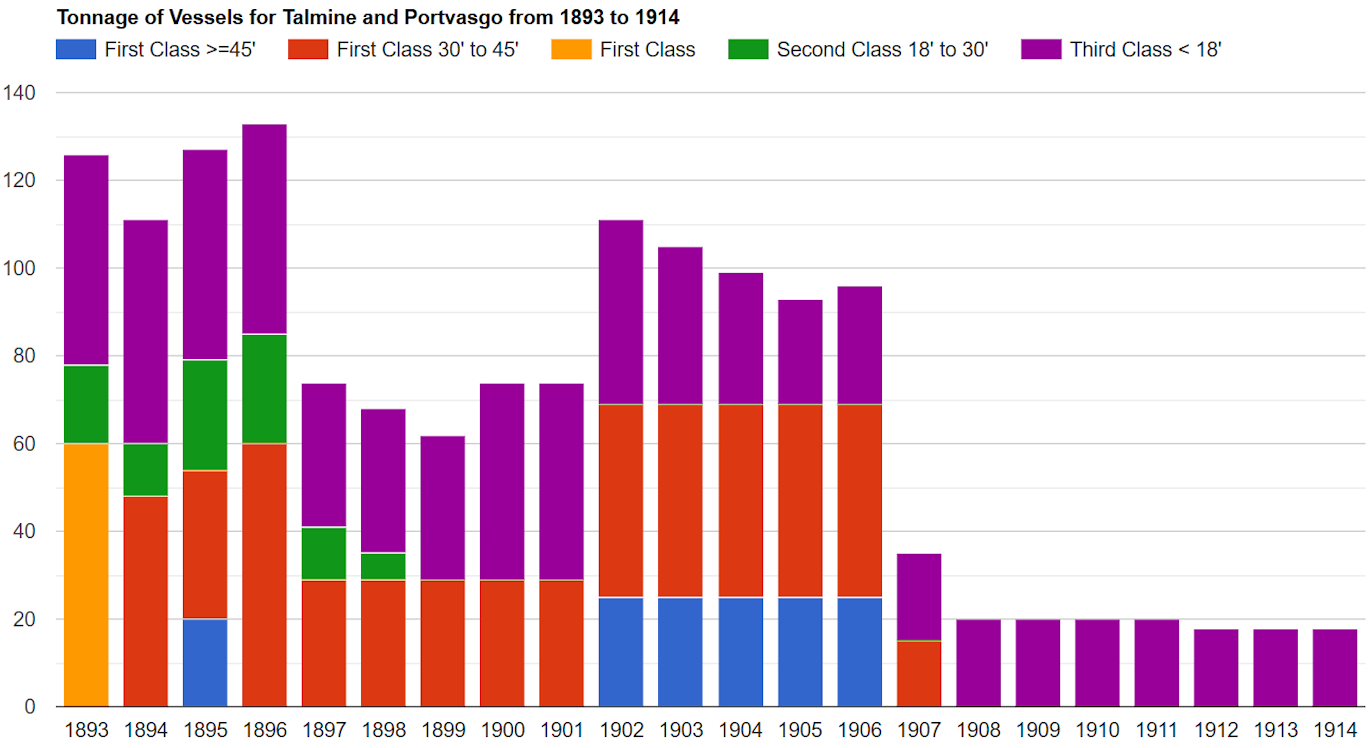
Tonnage of vessels

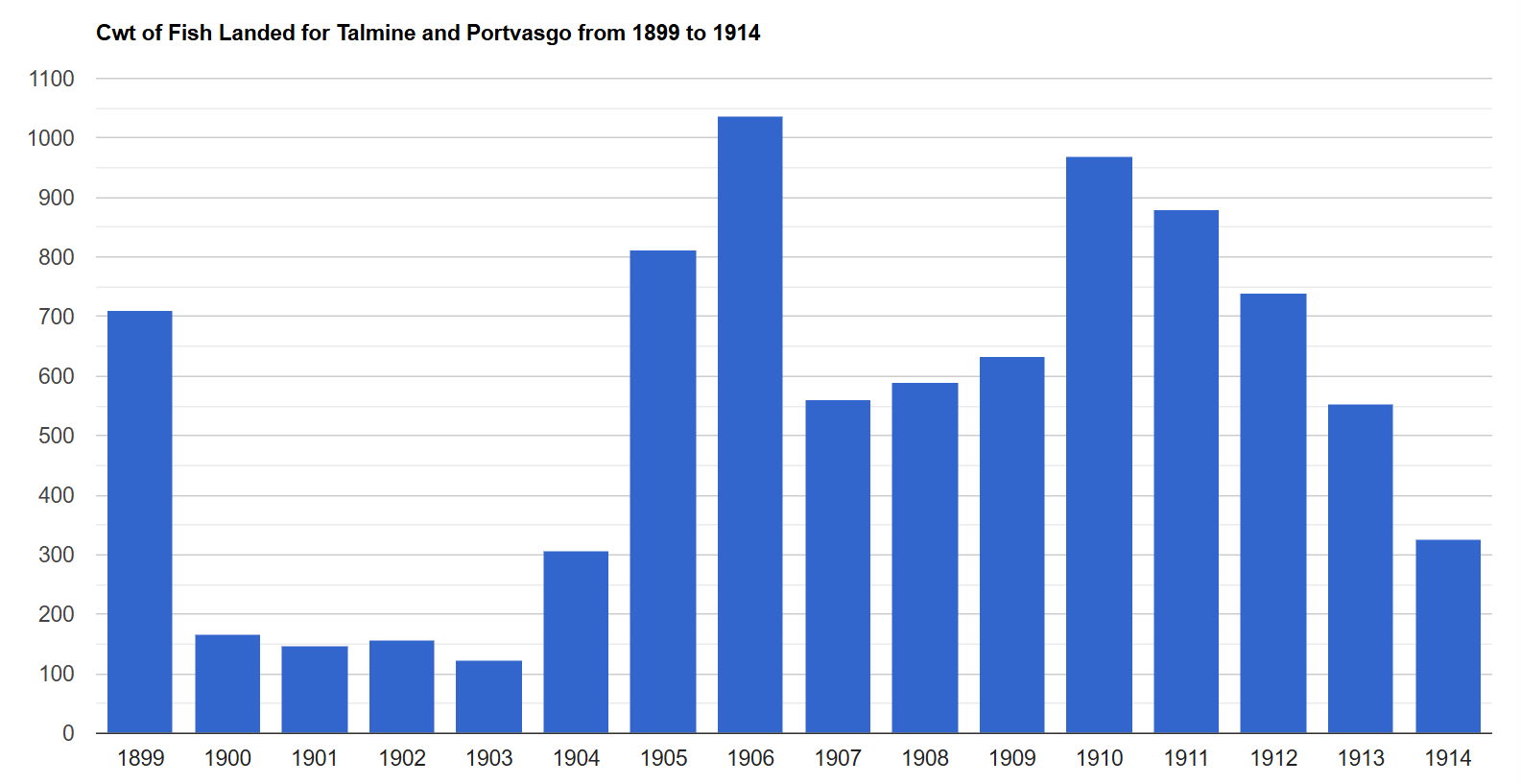
Cwt of fish landed

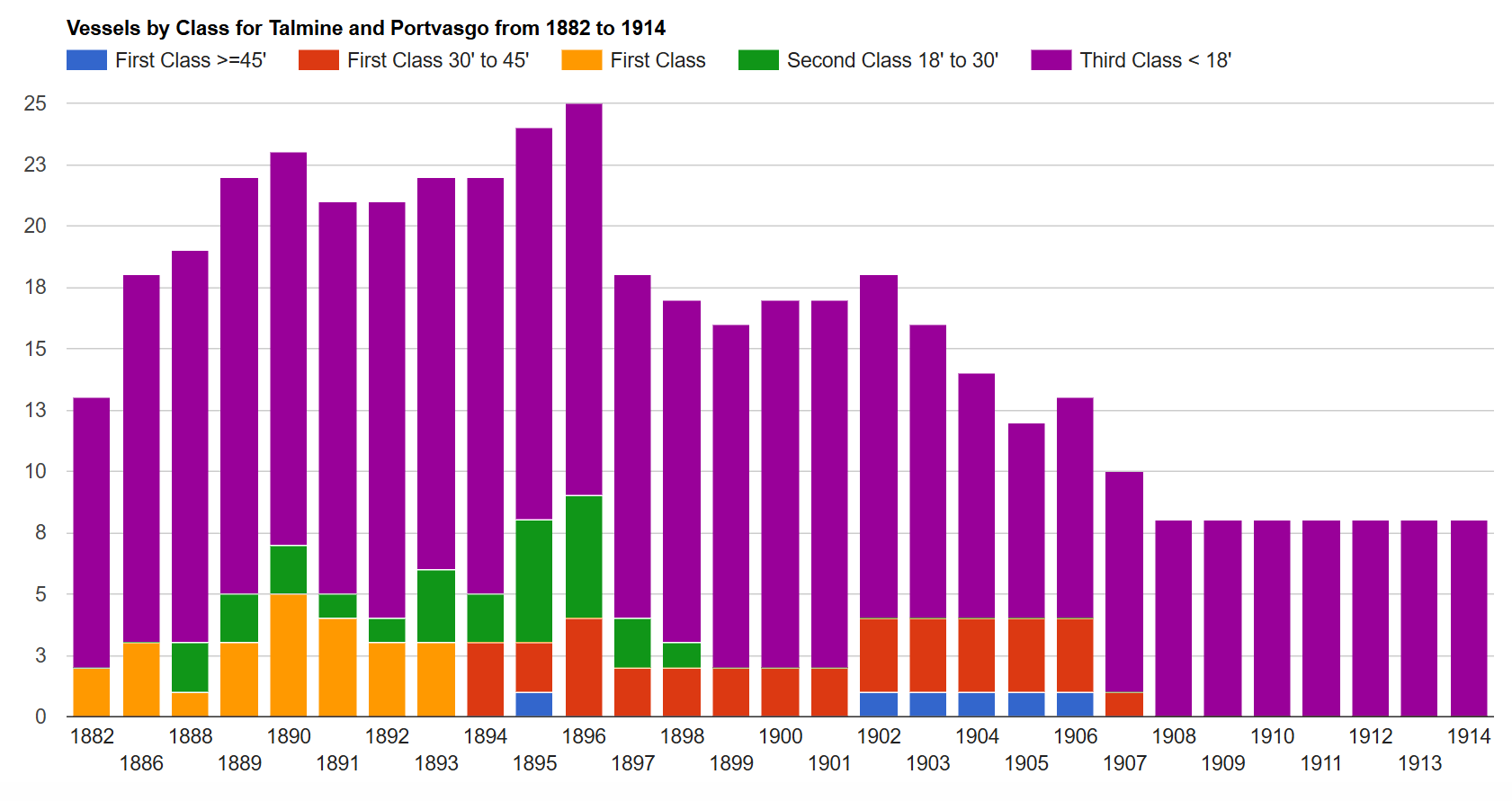
Vessels by class

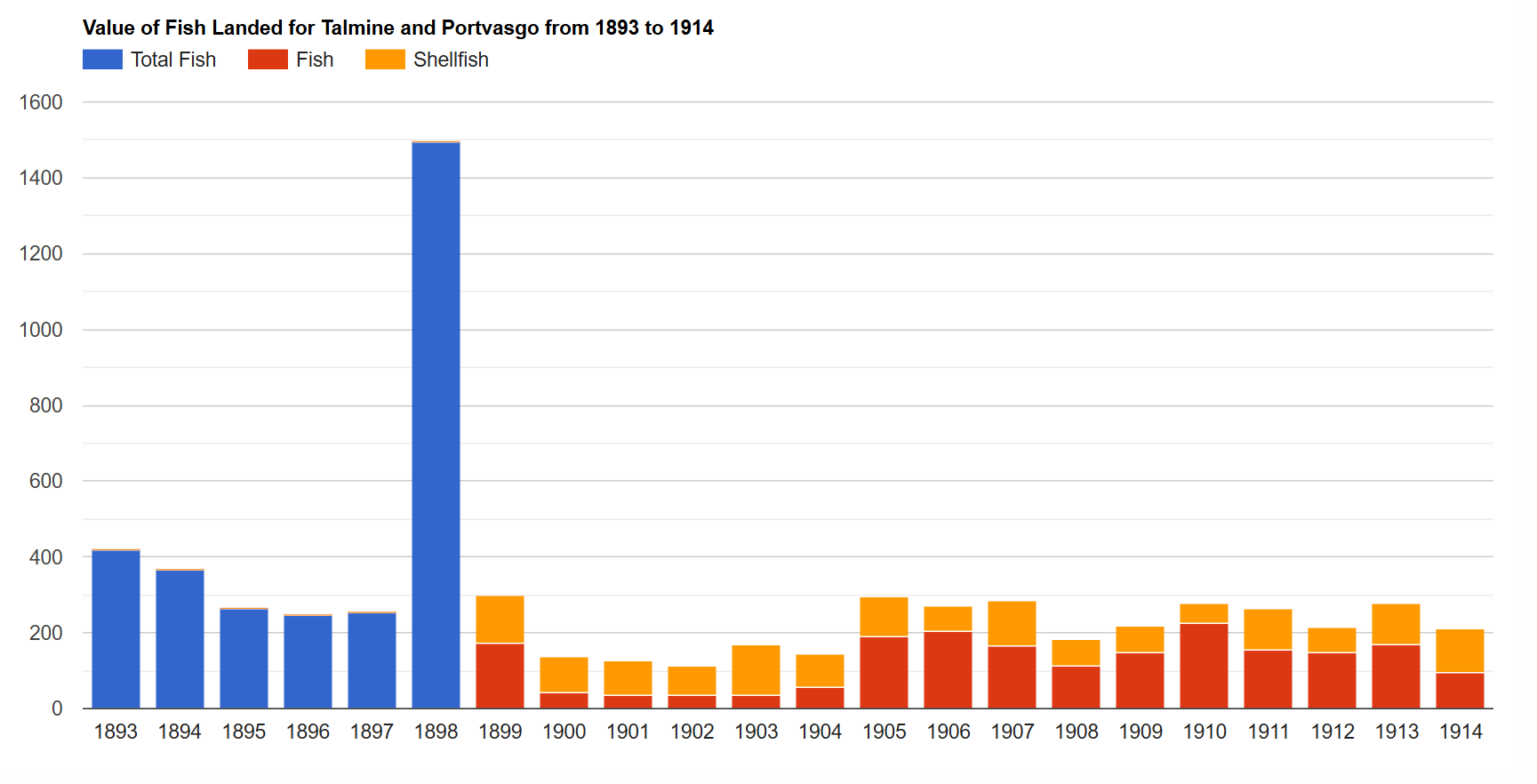
Value (£) of fish landed

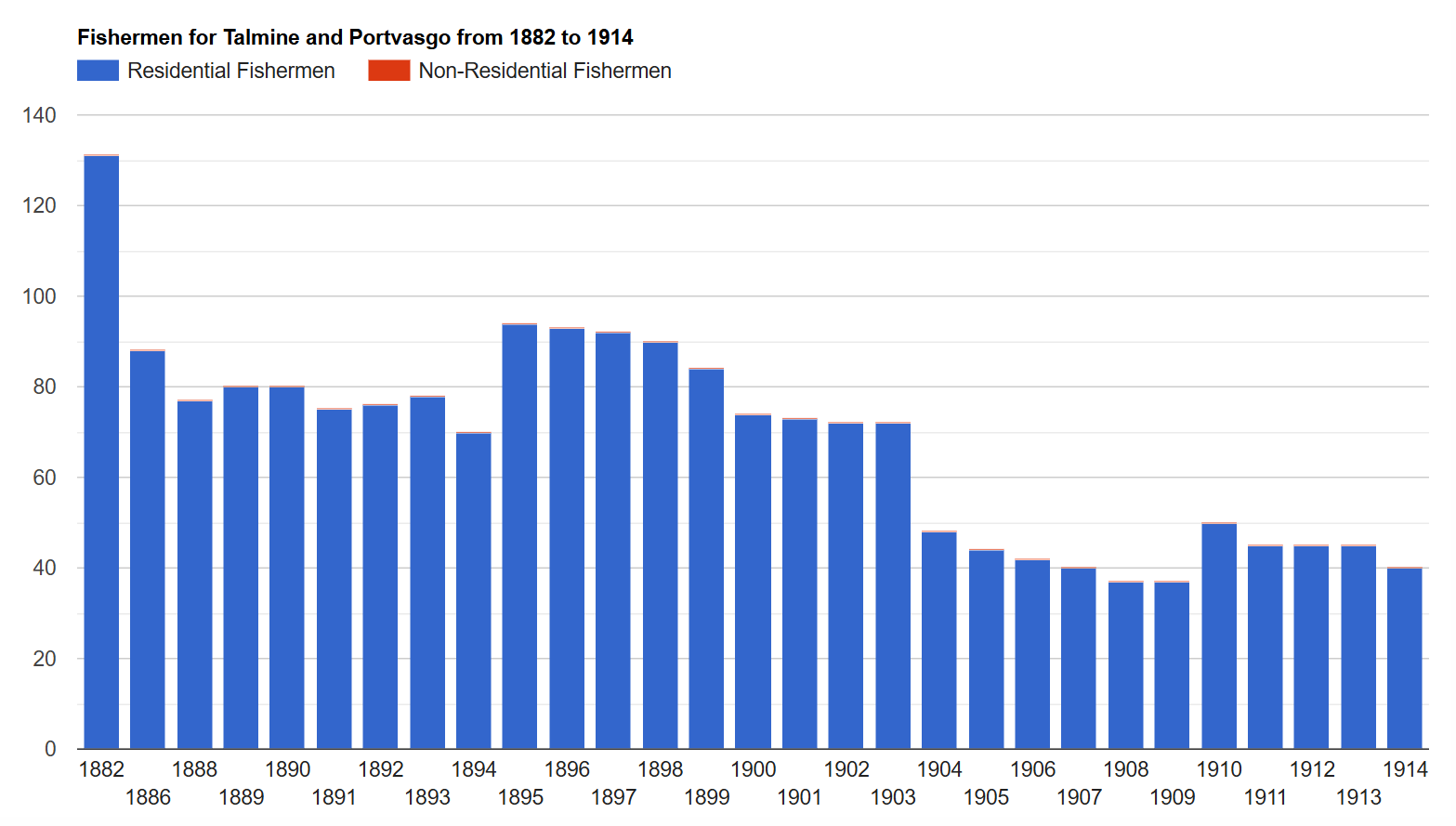
Fishermen

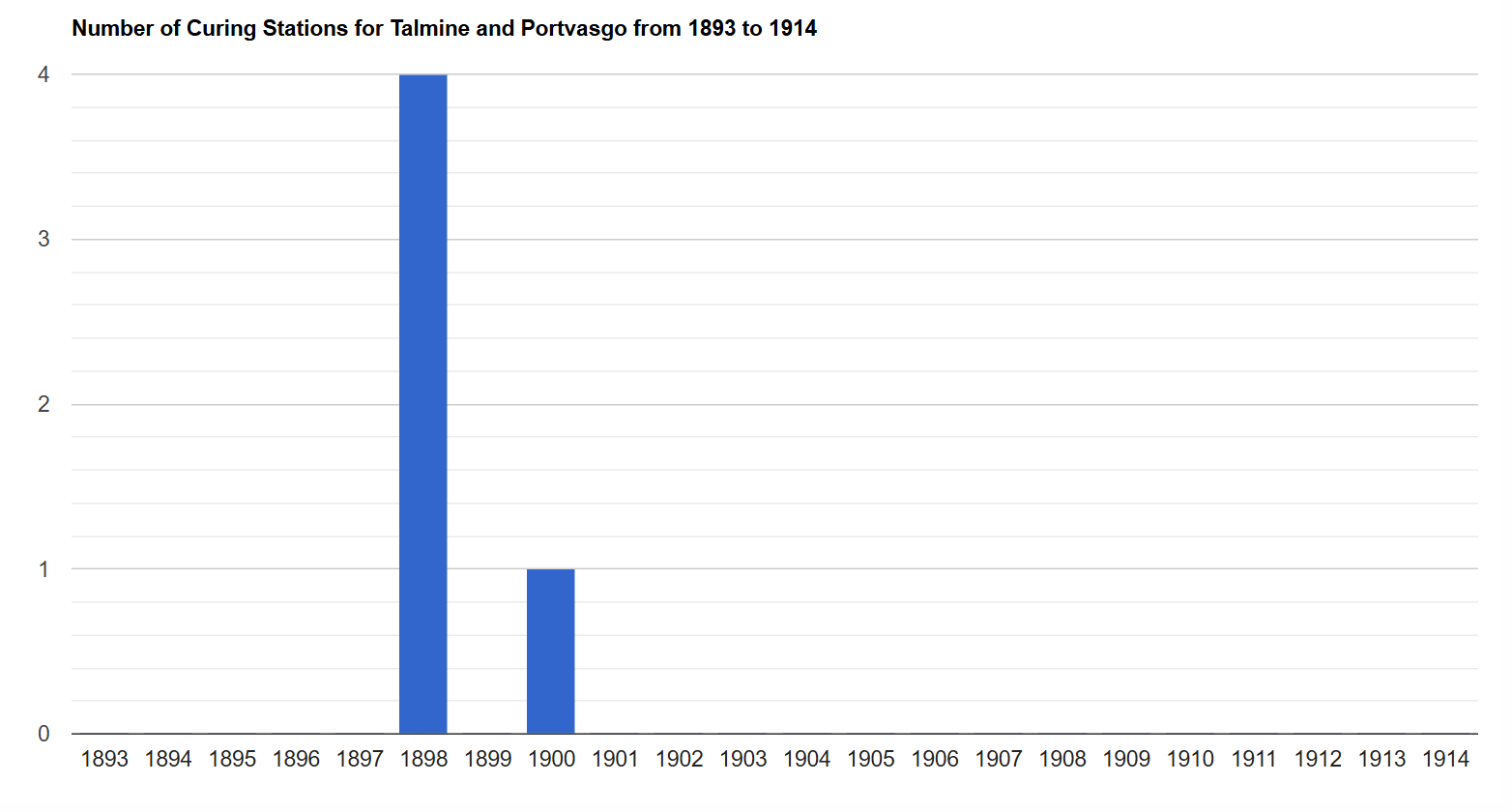
Number of curing stations

The very high result for 1898 is explained as follows: "The new harbour at Talmine ws the means of four curers from the East Coast opening curing stations there and twenty to thirty boats landed herrings during the months of May and June. The harbour proved a safe one, and easy of access, and is expected to be of great benefit to these creeks". However, in the following year we learn of "a large decrease in the quantity and value attributed to the failure of the herring fishing. This place, with its new harbour, it is feared, will not turn out as good a herring station as expected".
