= Kyle of Tongue Bridge =

Bridge and causeway in far north of Scotland

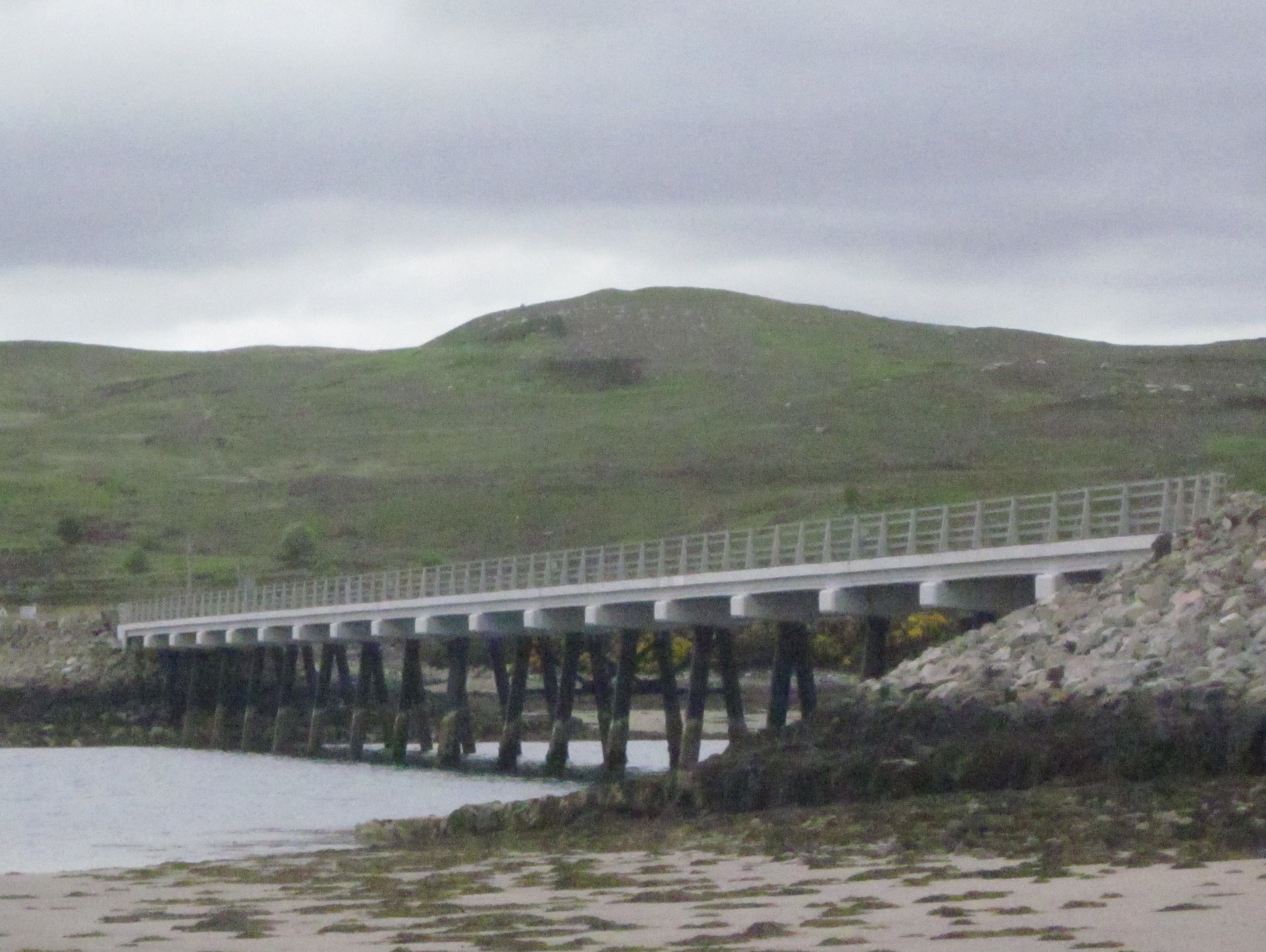
- Bridge crossing the Kyle of Tongue loch
- Coordinates: 58.492455°N 4.442216°W
- Carries: A838
- Crosses: Kyle of Tongue
- Locale: Sutherland

Characteristics
- Total length: 183 metres (600 ft)
- No. of spans: 18

History
- Designer: Sir Alexander Gibb & Partners
- Opened: 1971
- Replaces: A passenger ferry service that ran until 1956

Location
- Interactive map of Kyle of Tongue Bridge

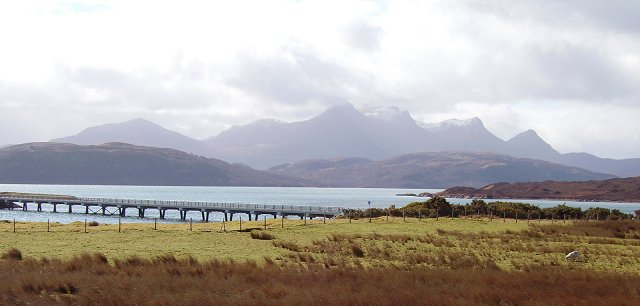
The bridge from the northwest with Ben Loyal in the background

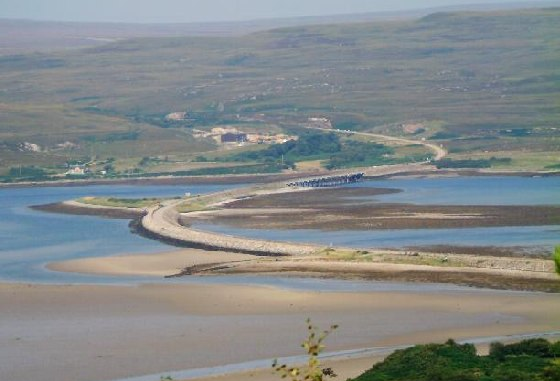
The causeway from the east

Location of Kyle of Tongue Bridge and Causeway in Sutherland

The Kyle of Tongue Bridge is part of the Kyle of Tongue Causeway, which crosses Kyle of Tongue sea loch on the north coast of Scotland.

The bridge and causeway were built by Sir Alexander Gibb & Partners in 1971 to carry the A838, the road from Thurso to Durness, across the loch. Until 1956 there had been a passenger ferry but the route around the head of the loch involved a narrow road some 10 miles (16 kilometres) long. The causeway is 3.8 kilometres (2 3/8 miles) long and it crosses a natural island, Tongue Island (Scottish Gaelic: Eilean Thunga). The 183-metre-long (600 ft) bridge is at the western end of the causeway and it has eighteen spans supported by twin piers. The bridge was fully refurbished in 2011.

== See also ==
- List of bridges in Scotland
