= Neave Island =

Island off the north coast of Scotland

Eilean na Naoimh or Eilean na Coomb (Gaelic)
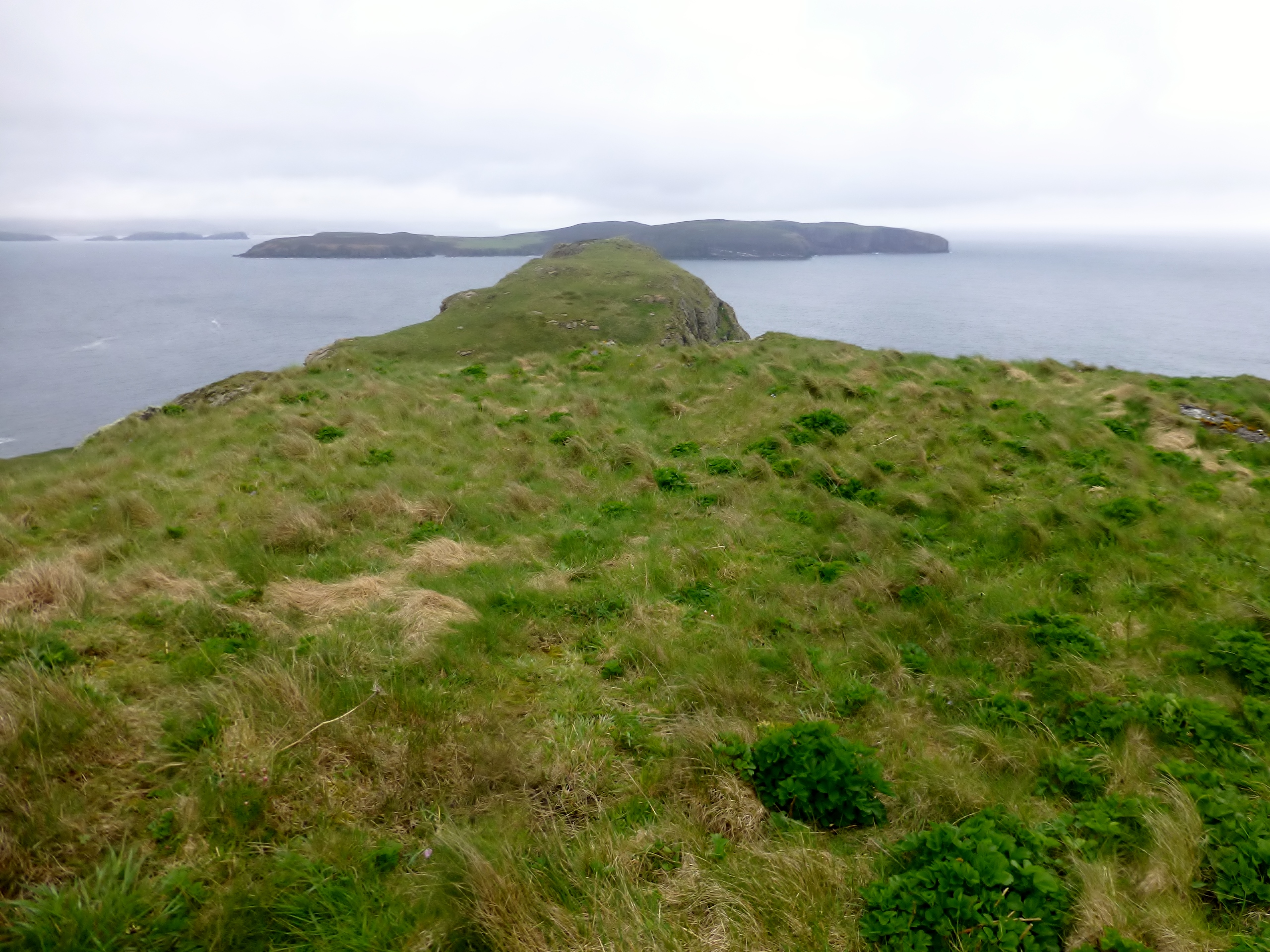

Location
- Neave Island shown within Highland Scotland
- OS grid reference: NC663643
- Coordinates: 58.54°N 4.29°W

Name
- Name meaning: Holy island

Physical geography
- Island group: Highland / Islands of Sutherland
- Area: 30 ha (74 acres)
- Highest elevation: 70 m (230 ft)

Administration
- Council area: Highland
- Country: Scotland
- Sovereign state: United Kingdom

Demographics
- Population: 0

Neave Island (Scottish Gaelic: Eilean na Naoimh, "Isle of the Saint") or Coomb(e) Island is an island in the council area of Highland, on the north coast of the Scottish mainland.

Neave Island is a small rugged island to the east of Eilean nan Ròn in Sutherland, separated from the mainland by a narrow channel, Caol Beag. It is just over 1/2 mile (800 metres) offshore from the mainland settlement of Skerray and is known for its sandy beach on the far eastern end of the island. There are remains of an ancient church, identified as St. Coloumba's Church on an 1874 map of the island.
