= Melness =

Coordinates: 58.532°N 4.432°W

Melness: Scottish Gaelic: Taobh Mhealanais
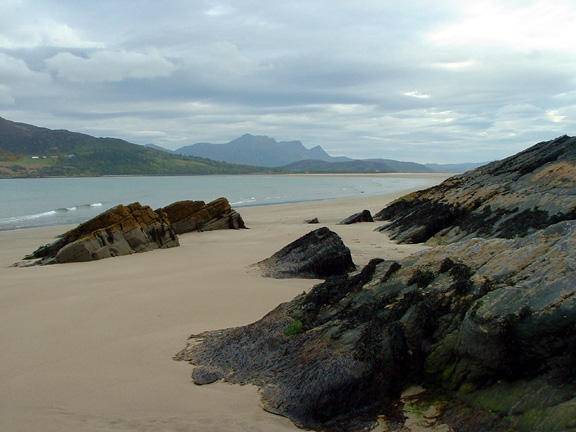
- Beach at Melness

- Location within the Sutherland area
- OS grid reference: NC585630
- Council area: Highland
- Lieutenancy area: Sutherland
- Country: Scotland
- Sovereign state: United Kingdom
- Post town: Lairg
- Postcode district: IV27 4
- Police: Scotland
- Fire: Scottish
- Ambulance: Scottish
- UK Parliament: Caithness, Sutherland and Easter Ross
- Scottish Parliament: Caithness, Sutherland and Ross

Melness (Gaelic: Taobh Mhealanais) is a locality comprising a group of small remote crofting townships, lying to the west of Tongue Bay opposite Coldbackie, in the north coast of Sutherland, Scottish Highlands. It is in the Scottish council area of Highland. The individual hamlets are:

- Achnahuaigh (Gaelic: Achadh na h-Uamha)
- Achininver (Gaelic: Achadh an Inbhir)
- Achintyhalavin
- Lubinvullin (Gaelic: Lùb a' Mhuilinn)
- Midfield (Gaelic: Pàirce Meadhanach)
- Midtown (Gaelic: Baile Meadhanach)
- Portvasgo (Gaelic: Port Faisgeach)
- Skinnet (Gaelic: Sgianaid)
- Strath Melness (Gaelic: Strath Mhealanais)
- Strathan or East Strathan (Gaelic: Srathan)
- Talmine (Gaelic: Tealamainn)
- West Strathan (Gaelic: Srathan Shuas)
