= Kyle of Tongue =

Shallow sea loch in northwest Highland, Scotland

Kyle of Tongue National Scenic Area
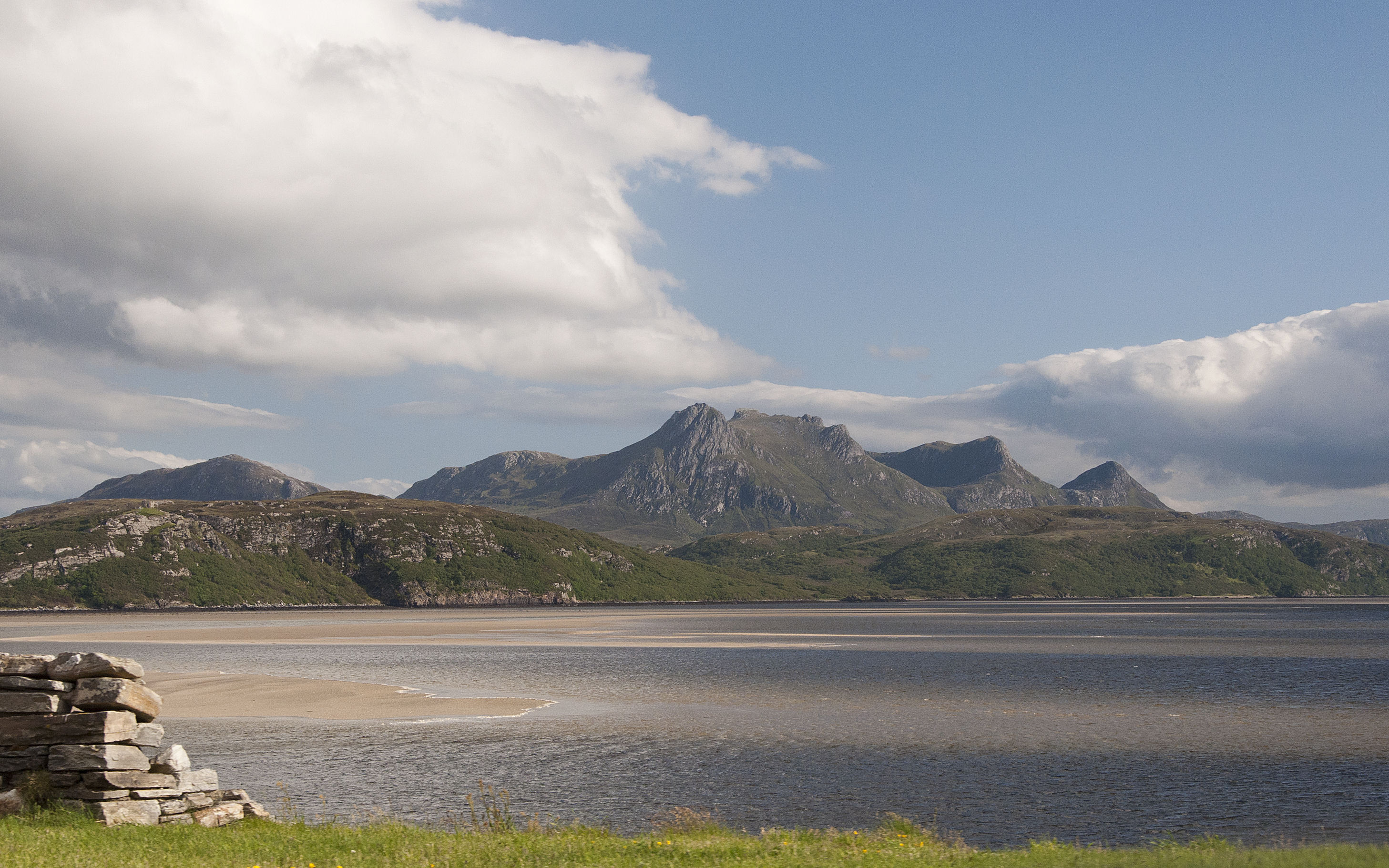
- Ben Loyal on the west side of Kyle of Tongue.

- Location within Sutherland
- Location: Sutherland, Highland, Scotland
- Coordinates: 58.477°N 4.453°W
- Area: 245 km^{2} (95 sq mi)
- Established: 1981
- Governing body: NatureScot

The Kyle of Tongue (Scottish Gaelic: Caol Thunga) is a shallow sea loch in northwest Highland, Scotland, in the western part of Sutherland. Featuring a rocky coastline, its mouth is formed at Tongue Bay. The community of Tongue is situated on the Kyle's eastern shore and the loch is crossed by the Kyle of Tongue Bridge and Causeway.

The sea loch and surrounding countryside is designated as the Kyle of Tongue National Scenic Area, one of the forty such areas in Scotland, which are defined so as to identify areas of exceptional scenery and to ensure its protection from inappropriate development. The designated area covers 24,488 ha in total, of which 21,093 ha is on land, with a further 3396 ha being marine (i.e. below low tide level), and takes in the nearby mountains of Ben Hope and Ben Loyal as well as several small islands and the coastline as far east as Bettyhill.

== History ==
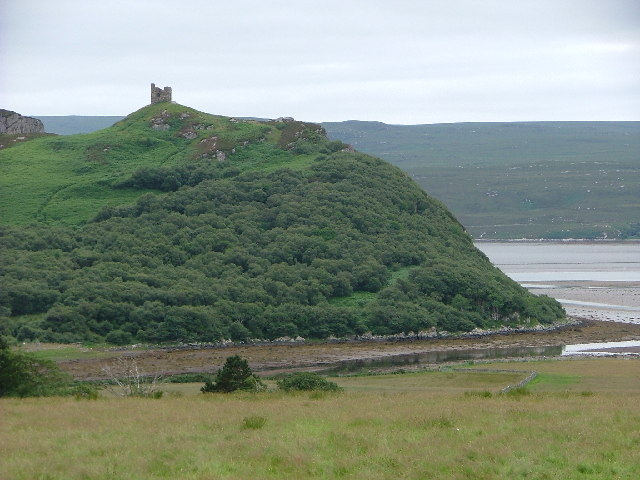
Castle Varrich, overlooking the Kyle.

According to the Origines Parochiales Scotiae, Castle Varrich, an old square tower on a hill on the east side of the Kyle, was the residence of Karl Hundason, who made an effort to conquer Scotland on the death of Malcolm II. There are three brochs: on the Kyle's east side opposite Melness; at the head of the Kyle; and at Dunbuie, a hill on the west side of the Kyle.

In 1746, a naval engagement occurred at the Kyle involving Bonnie Prince Charlie's Jacobite rebellion. The Jacobite ship Le Prince Charles, commanded by Captain Richard Talbot, was bringing a large amount of French gold to aid the Jacobite cause. It was chased by a British squadron and one of the Royal Navy frigates eventually caught up with it in the Kyle of Tongue, on 25 February 1746. A fierce five-hour battle took place: the Jacobite ship fought bravely, but in the end was defeated. The failure of the gold to reach the Prince's army was one of the main factors which led to the Battle of Culloden.

== Geography ==
Kyle of Tongue is situated 8 miles (13 km) east of Loch Eriboll. Its western entrance is between Cnoc Glass and Roan Island; the eastern entrance is between Rosin Island and Neave Island. From Roan Island, the Kyle trends in a south and southwest direction for 7 miles (11 km) to Kinloch. A large portion of it is sandy, with a narrow bar-encumbered channel running through it. The depths range from approximately 18 fathoms west of Roan Island to 5 fathoms in the area 1.5 miles (2.4 km) above where the shallows begin. There is no channel into the Kyle of Tongue along the western shore. Derry (or Loch an Dithreibh) is a lake which empties into the head of the Kyle of Tongue. Strathtongue, an 8-mile (13 km) long stream, runs to the Kyle.

== Flora and fauna ==
The surrounding hills are characterized by meadows, grasses, and heath. There is moorland between the Kyle and Loch Eriboll. Much of the area is protected as part of the Natura 2000 network, forming part of the Caithness and Sutherland Peatlands, which are protected as both a Special Protection Area and a Special Area of Conservation. Water fauna within the Kyle include salmon and sea trout, whilst whales and otters can be found at the mouth of the loch. Bird species living in the area include barn swallows, black-headed gulls, ravens, redshanks, wood pigeons, herring gulls, collared doves, curlews, oystercatchers, golden plovers, great black-backed gulls, cormorants, grey herons, greylag geese, house martins, house sparrows, meadow pipits, common gulls, red-throated divers, and rock pigeons. Additionally, a number of raptor species can be found, including golden eagles, hen harriers, merlins and short-eared owls.

== Land ownership ==
Much of the land on the western and southern sides of the Kyle, including the mountains of Ben Hope and Ben Loyal and the former hunting lodge of Kinloch Lodge, belongs to Danish billionaire Anders Holch Povlsen. The land on the eastern shore forms part of the extensive estates of the Countess of Sutherland, currently Elizabeth Sutherland, 24th Countess of Sutherland.
