= Ben Loyal =

Mountain in Scotland

Coordinates: 58.40439°N 4.43517°W

- Beinn Laghail
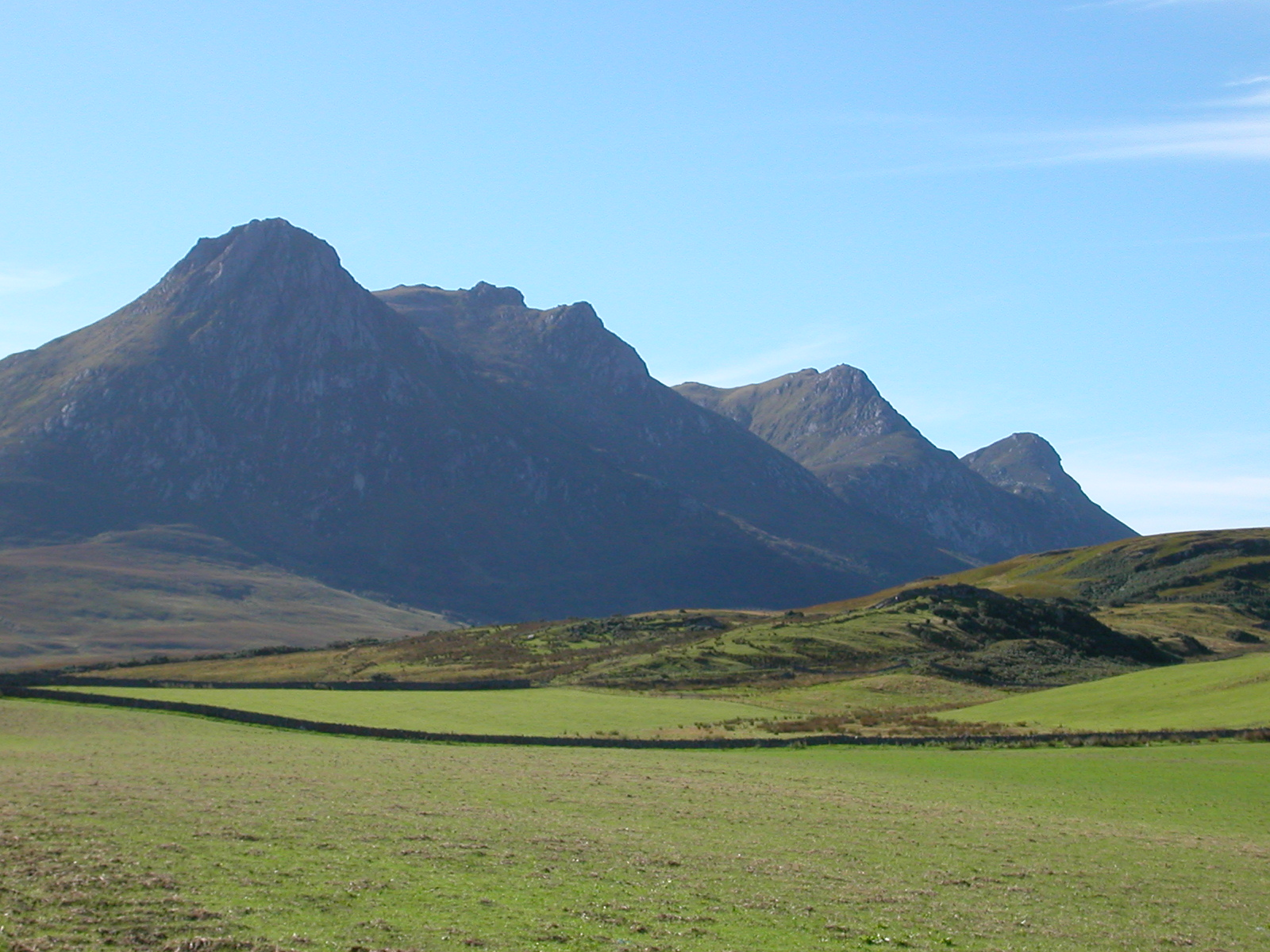
- Ben Loyal from the north. An Caisteal is the jagged peak second from the left.

Highest point
- Elevation: 764 m (2,507 ft)
- Prominence: 609 m (1,998 ft)
- Parent peak: Ben Hope
- Listing: Corbett, Marilyn

Naming
- Pronunciation: /ˌbɛn ˈlɔɪ.əl/

Geography
- Location: Sutherland, Scotland
- OS grid: NC578488
- Topo map: OS Landranger 10

Ben Loyal (from Scottish Gaelic Beinn Laghail) is an isolated mountain of 764 m in Sutherland, the northwestern tip of the Scottish Highlands. It is a Corbett located south of the Kyle of Tongue and offers good views of the Kyle, Loch Loyal to the east, and Ben Hope to the west.

Ben Loyal is composed chiefly of granite, specifically syenite, and has a distinctive shape due to the four rocky peaks, the highest of which is called An Caisteal. To the north of An Caisteal is the 712 m Sgòr Chaonasaid, to the south is Bheinn Bheag (744 m), which cannot be seen in the photograph opposite, and to the west is the ridge of Sgòr a Chèirich, 644 m at its highest point. The fourth peak in the picture is the 568 m Sgòr Fionnaich.

The upland of Ben Loyal is designated a Site of Special Scientific Interest (SSSI) by NatureScot due to its geology, habitats and species present.

Ben Loyal's name is thought to mean "law mountain", although the derivation via its modern Gaelic name is not certain.

== Access ==
Ben Loyal is a part of Ben Loyal Estate, formerly owned by Adam Knuth of Knuthenborg, Denmark. In 2012, The Daily Telegraph reported that fellow Dane Anders Holch Povlsen now owned the 24,000-acre (9,700-hectare) estate.

Access is by a farm track which approaches from the north, starting at a farm called Ribigill (rented until the early 20th century by the family of British actor David Mitchell).

== See also ==
- Geology of Scotland
- Mountain bagging
