= Tongue Bay =

Bay in northwest Highland, Scotland

Coordinates: 58.52°N 4.40°W

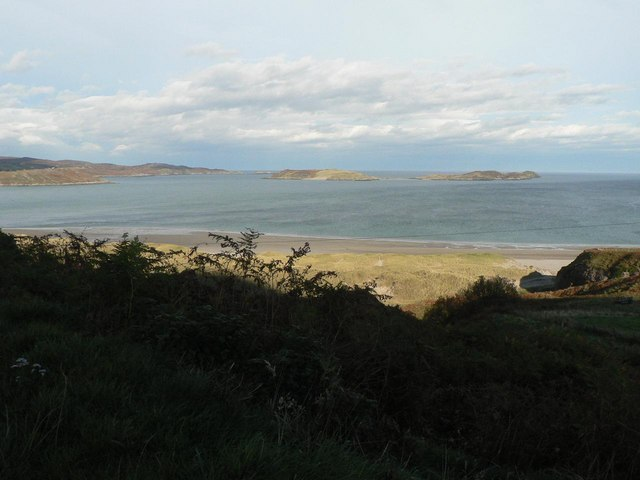
Tongue Bay and Rabbit Islands

Tongue Bay (Scottish Gaelic: Tunga from Old Norse: Tunga) is located in northwest Highland, Scotland, in the western part of the former county of Sutherland. Skullomie is a small fishing and crofting hamlet at the head of the bay, while Melness is a group of crofting townships west of it. Talmine, a crofting and fishing township, is situated on Talmine Bay, an inlet on the western shore of Tongue Bay. The Rabbit Islands are three, uninhabited islands across from the bay; Eilean nan Ròn (island of seals) is at its mouth.

From Tongue Bay, the coast extends to the northwest and the east. In general, it is high and rocky, and is intersected by several small creeks. Rocks along the coast are hollowed into caves, or formed into arches and pillars. The tides follow the direction of the coast nearly from east to west. The Shamrock, a 19th-century sloop located within the bay, is protected by Royal Commission on the Ancient and Historical Monuments of Scotland, as is Scullomie Harbour, also within the bay.
