= Tongue, Sutherland =

Coastal village in Scotland

Coordinates: 58°28′34″N 04°25′03″W

Tongue: Scottish Gaelic: Tunga; Scots: Tunga
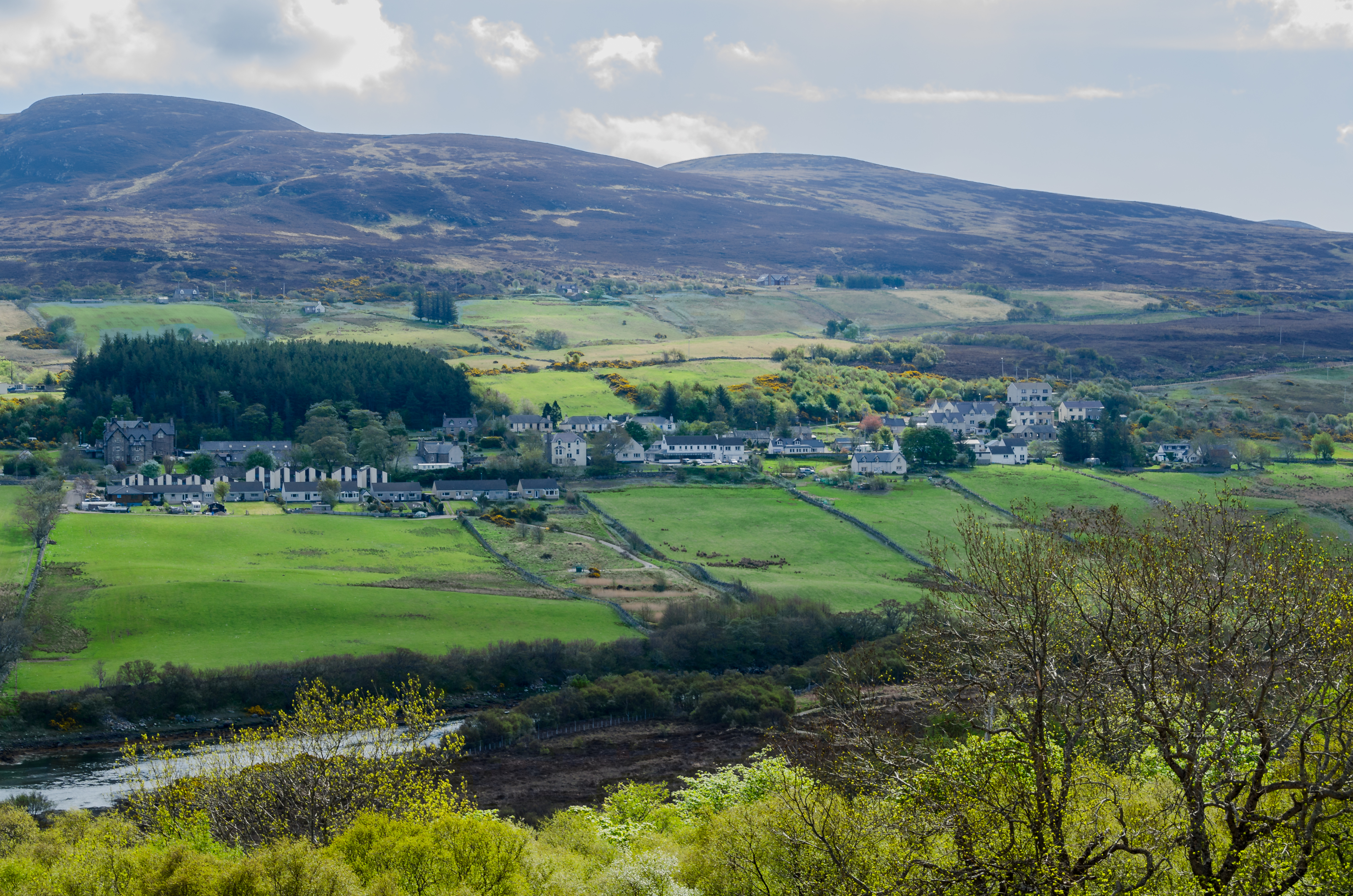
- Tongue, Highland, Scotland

- Location within the Sutherland area
- Population: 564 (2011 census)
- OS grid reference: NC591570
  - Edinburgh: 180 mi (290 km)
  - London: 510 mi (821 km)
- Council area: Highland
- Lieutenancy area: Sutherland
- Country: Scotland
- Sovereign state: United Kingdom
- Post town: LAIRG
- Postcode district: IV27
- Dialling code: 01847
- Police: Scotland
- Fire: Scottish
- Ambulance: Scottish
- UK Parliament: Caithness, Sutherland and Easter Ross
- Scottish Parliament: Caithness, Sutherland and Ross constituency in the Highlands and Islands electoral region

Tongue (Scottish Gaelic: Tunga from Old Norse: Tunga, also Old English: Tunge) is a coastal village in northwest Highland, Scotland, in the northern part of the former county of Sutherland. It lies on the east shore above the base of the Kyle of Tongue and north of the mountains Ben Hope and Ben Loyal on the A836. To the north lies the area of Braetongue.

Tongue is the main village in a series of crofting townships that runs through Coldbackie, Dalharn, Blandy, and the harbour of Scullomie to the deserted township of Slettel. The village includes a youth hostel, a craft shop, a general store and garage, a bank, a post office and two hotels, the Tongue Hotel and the Ben Loyal Hotel. It is connected to the west side of the Kyle by the Kyle of Tongue Bridge and Causeway, built in 1971. Tongue is perhaps best known nowadays because it is one of the larger settlements on the route of the North Coast 500, a popular tourist route.

== Toponymy ==
Contrary to popular belief, the name Tongue does not refer to the shape of the Kyle of Tongue (though the kyle can be described as "tongue-shaped"). Rather it is a geographical term in Old Norse which refers to a piece of land shaped like a spit or tongue. That tongue of land projecting into the Kyle is the terminal moraine of the Kyle of Tongue glacier, and forms the eastern part of the Kyle of Tongue causeway.

In Gaelic, Tunga indicates the village, whereas Caol Thunga indicates the kyle. The village is also known as Ceann Tàile and formerly as Circeabol.

== History ==
The area was an historic crossroad for Gaels, Picts and Vikings.

Tongue House is the historic seat of the Clan Mackay, after they abandoned Castle Varrich (Caisteal Bharraich). The ruins of the castle, built at Tongue in the eleventh century after the clan were expelled from their ancestral province of Moray to County Sutherland, are a popular tourist attraction. A battle for succession some time around 1427 to 1433 culminated in the Battle of Drumnacoub, in which two factions of the clan fought on Carn Fada, between the Kyle and Ben Loyal.

The village saw a key battle between a Jacobite treasure ship and two ships of the Royal Navy in 1746, which resulted in the Jacobite crew trying to slip ashore with their gold. They were then caught by the Navy, supported by local people who were loyal to Hanover, which cost Bonnie Prince Charlie valuable support in the run-up to Culloden.

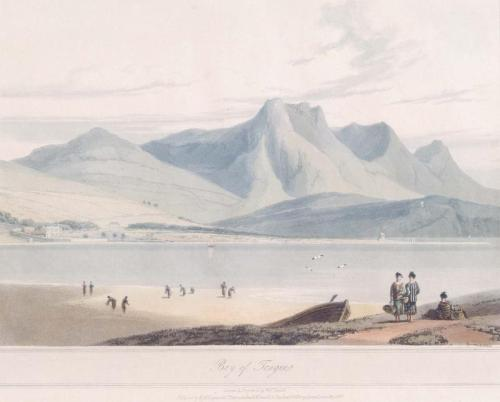
Bay of Tongue - William Daniell - 1821. In Aberdeen Art Gallery

In the Highland Clearances, many people who were cleared from the interior of Sutherland moved to this village. The Gaelic poet Ewen Robertson (Scottish Gaelic: Eòghainn MacDhonnchaidh, 1842–95) lived in Tongue his entire life, and is most famous for his song "Mo mhallachd aig na caoraich mhòr" ("My curses on the Border sheep") mocking, among others, the Duchess of Sutherland and Patrick Sellar. The song has been recorded by notable singers Julie Fowlis and Kathleen MacInnes. There is a monument to Robertson in Tongue.

== Notable people from Tongue ==
- U.S. Senator from Tennessee, treasury secretary, and diplomat George W. Campbell was born in Tongue before emigrating to North Carolina.
- Environmental scientist, Professor Anson Mackay, comes from a crofting family in Tongue and lived there until he went to University.

== See also ==
- Tongue Bay

== Bibliography ==
- Rose, L.A.; Macaroon, M.; Crow, V. (2011). Frommer's Scotland. Frommer's Complete Guides. Wiley. p. 346. ISBN 978-1-119-97259-4.
- Walmsley, A. (2012). Walking in Scotland's Far North. Cicerone Press. p. 32. ISBN 978-1-84965-479-1.
