= List of United Kingdom locations: Ca-Cap =

The United Kingdom

This is part of the list of United Kingdom locations: a gazetteer of place names in the United Kingdom showing each place's locality and geographical coordinates.

== Ca ==
=== Cab ===
Location	Locality	Coordinates (links to map & photo sources)	OS grid reference
Cabbacott	Devon	50.96°N 04.28°W	SS4021
Cabbage Hill	Berkshire	51.43°N 00.76°W	SU8671
Cabharstadh	Western Isles	58.08°N 06.48°W	NB3619
Cabin	Shropshire	52.49°N 03.01°W	SO3189
Cabourne	Lincolnshire	53.49°N 00.29°W	TA1301
Cabrach	Moray	57.33°N 03.03°W	NJ3827
Cabrich	Highland	57.45°N 04.45°W	NH5343
Cabus	Lancashire	53.91°N 02.77°W	SD4947

=== Cac ===
Location	Locality	Coordinates (links to map & photo sources)	OS grid reference
Cackle Hill	Lincolnshire	52.81°N -00.00°E	TF3526
Cackleshaw	Bradford	53.83°N 01.94°W	SE0438
Cackle Street (near Nutley)	East Sussex	51.01°N 00.06°E	TQ4526
Cackle Street (near Brede)	East Sussex	50.94°N 00.40°E	TQ6919
Cackle Street (near Netherfield)	East Sussex	50.93°N 00.58°E	TQ8218

=== Cad ===
Location	Locality	Coordinates (links to map & photo sources)	OS grid reference
Cadbury	Devon	50.82°N 03.54°W	SS9104
Cadbury Heath	South Gloucestershire	51.44°N 02.49°W	ST6672
Cadder	East Dunbartonshire	55.92°N 04.22°W	NS6172
Caddington	Bedfordshire	51.85°N 00.46°W	TL0619
Caddonlee	Scottish Borders	55.60°N 02.89°W	NT4435
Cadeby	Doncaster	53.49°N 01.23°W	SE5100
Cadeby	Leicestershire	52.61°N 01.38°W	SK4202
Cadeleigh	Devon	50.85°N 03.55°W	SS9107
Cademuir	Scottish Borders	55.61°N 03.23°W	NT2236
Cader	Denbighshire	53.13°N 03.49°W	SJ0061
Cade Street	East Sussex	50.95°N 00.27°E	TQ6020
Cadger Path	Angus	56.70°N 02.83°W	NO4957
Cad Green	Somerset	50.94°N 02.94°W	ST3417
Cadgwith	Cornwall	49.98°N 05.18°W	SW7214
Cadham	Fife	56.20°N 03.17°W	NO2702
Cadishead	Cheshire	53.42°N 02.45°W	SJ7092
Cadle	Swansea	51.65°N 03.99°W	SS6297
Cadley	Lancashire	53.77°N 02.72°W	SD5231
Cadley (Savernake)	Wiltshire	51.39°N 01.71°W	SU2066
Cadley (Collingbourne Ducis)	Wiltshire	51.28°N 01.65°W	SU2454
Cadmore End	Buckinghamshire	51.62°N 00.87°W	SU7892
Cadnam	Hampshire	50.91°N 01.58°W	SU2913
Cadney	North Lincolnshire	53.51°N 00.47°W	TA0103
Cadney Bank	Shropshire	52.90°N 02.80°W	SJ4634
Cadole	Flintshire	53.14°N 03.19°W	SJ2062
Cadoxton	The Vale Of Glamorgan	51.25°N 03.15°W	ST125695
Cadoxton-Juxta-Neath	Neath Port Talbot	51.66°N 03.00°W	SS7598
Cadshaw	Lancashire	53.65°N 02.45°W	SD7018
Cadwell	Hertfordshire	51.97°N 00.28°W	TL1832
Cadzow	South Lanarkshire	55.75°N 04.05°W	NS7153

=== Cae ===
Location	Locality	Coordinates (links to map & photo sources)	OS grid reference
Caeathro	Gwynedd	53.12°N 04.24°W	SH5061
Cae Clyd	Gwynedd	52.97°N 03.92°W	SH7144
Caehopkin	Powys	51.79°N 03.71°W	SN8212
Caemorgan	Ceredigion	52.09°N 04.64°W	SN1947
Caenby	Lincolnshire	53.38°N 00.49°W	TF0089
Caerau	Bridgend	51.63°N 03.66°W	SS8594
Caerau	Cardiff	51.46°N 03.25°W	ST1375
Caerau Park	City of Newport	51.57°N 03.02°W	ST2987
Cae'r-bont	Powys	51.78°N 03.74°W	SN8011
Cae'r-bryn	Carmarthenshire	51.79°N 04.04°W	SN5913
Caerdeon	Gwynedd	52.74°N 04.00°W	SH6518
Caerdydd (Cardiff)	Cardiff	51.47°N 03.18°W	ST1876
Caer-Estyn	Wrexham	53.10°N 03.01°W	SJ3257
Caerfarchell	Pembrokeshire	51.88°N 05.21°W	SM7926
Caerffili (Caerphilly)	Caerphilly	51.56°N 03.22°W	ST1586
Caerfyrddin (Carmarthen)	Carmarthenshire	51.85°N 04.31°W	SN4120
Caergeiliog	Isle of Anglesey	53.27°N 04.55°W	SH3078
Caergwrle	Flintshire	53.10°N 03.04°W	SJ3057
Caergybi (Holyhead)	Isle of Anglesey	53.30°N 04.64°W	SH2482
Caerhendy	Neath Port Talbot	51.60°N 03.77°W	SS7791
Caerhun	Gwynedd	53.19°N 04.14°W	SH5769
Cae'r-Lan	Powys	51.79°N 03.74°W	SN8012
Caerleon	City of Newport	51.60°N 02.96°W	ST3390
Caermead	The Vale Of Glamorgan	51.41°N 03.51°W	SS9569
Caermeini	Pembrokeshire	51.94°N 04.70°W	SN1431
Caernarfon	Gwynedd	53.13°N 04.27°W	SH4862
Caerphilly	Caerphilly County Borough	51.56°N 03.22°W	ST1586
Caersws	Powys	52.51°N 03.43°W	SO0392
Caerwedros	Ceredigion	52.16°N 04.38°W	SN3755
Caerwent	Monmouthshire	51.60°N 02.78°W	ST4690
Caerwent Brook	Monmouthshire	51.59°N 02.76°W	ST4789
Caerwys	Flintshire	53.23°N 03.32°W	SJ1272

=== Cag ===
Location	Locality	Coordinates (links to map & photo sources)	OS grid reference
Cage Green	Kent	51.20°N 00.27°E	TQ5947
Caggle Street	Monmouthshire	51.84°N 02.93°W	SO3617

=== Cai ===
Location	Locality	Coordinates (links to map & photo sources)	OS grid reference
Caim	Isle of Anglesey	53.29°N 04.07°W	SH6280
Cainscross	Gloucestershire	51.74°N 02.24°W	SO8305
Caio	Carmarthenshire	52.03°N 03.94°W	SN6739
Cairinis (Carinish)	Western Isles	57.51°N 07.33°W	NF8160
Cairnbaan	Argyll and Bute	56.05°N 05.48°W	NR8390
Cairnbulg	Aberdeenshire	57.67°N 01.95°W	NK0365
Cairncross	Angus	56.90°N 02.83°W	NO4979
Cairndow	Argyll and Bute	56.24°N 04.93°W	NN1810
Cairneyhill	Fife	56.05°N 03.54°W	NT0486
Cairnhill	Aberdeenshire	57.37°N 02.56°W	NJ6632
Cairnhill	North Lanarkshire	55.85°N 03.99°W	NS7564
Cairnie	Aberdeenshire	57.48°N 02.86°W	NJ4844
Cairnleith Crofts	Aberdeenshire	57.40°N 02.16°W	NJ9035
Cairnorrie	Aberdeenshire	57.45°N 02.23°W	NJ8640
Cairnpark	Dumfries and Galloway	55.26°N 03.79°W	NX8698
Cairnryan	Dumfries and Galloway	54.96°N 05.03°W	NX0668
Cairns of Coll	Argyll and Bute	56.70°N 06.42°W	NM292661
Cairston	Orkney Islands	58.98°N 03.28°W	HY2611
Caister-on-Sea	Norfolk	52.64°N 01.72°E	TG5212
Caistor	Lincolnshire	53.49°N 00.32°W	TA1101
Caistor St Edmund	Norfolk	52.57°N 01.29°E	TG2303

=== Cak ===
Location	Locality	Coordinates (links to map & photo sources)	OS grid reference
Cakebole	Worcestershire	52.34°N 02.19°W	SO8772

=== Cal ===
Location	Locality	Coordinates (links to map & photo sources)	OS grid reference
Calais Street	Suffolk	52.01°N 00.86°E	TL9739
Calanais	Western Isles	58.19°N 06.75°W	NB2133
Calbha Beag	Highland	58.28°N 05.14°W	NC156368
Calbha Mòr	Highland	58.28°N 05.13°W	NC163370
Calbost	Western Isles	58.06°N 06.39°W	NB4117
Calbourne	Isle of Wight	50.67°N 01.40°W	SZ4286
Calceby	Lincolnshire	53.25°N 00.08°E	TF3975
Calcoed	Flintshire	53.25°N 03.24°W	SJ1774
Calcot	Berkshire	51.43°N 01.05°W	SU6671
Calcot	Gloucestershire	51.78°N 01.88°W	SP0810
Calcot Row	Berkshire	51.43°N 01.05°W	SU6671
Calcott	Kent	51.31°N 01.11°E	TR1762
Calcott	Shropshire	52.71°N 02.83°W	SJ4413
Calcott's Green	Gloucestershire	51.85°N 02.32°W	SO7817
Calcutt	Wiltshire	51.63°N 01.84°W	SU1193
Calcutt	North Yorkshire	53.99°N 01.48°W	SE3455
Caldbeck	Cumbria	54.74°N 03.05°W	NY3239
Caldbergh	North Yorkshire	54.26°N 01.86°W	SE0985
Caldecote (Huntingdonshire)	Cambridgeshire	52.47°N 00.32°W	TL1488
Caldecote (South Cambridgeshire)	Cambridgeshire	52.19°N 00.04°W	TL3457
Caldecote	Hertfordshire	52.02°N 00.20°W	TL2338
Caldecote	Northamptonshire	52.15°N 01.00°W	SP6851
Caldecote	Warwickshire	52.54°N 01.48°W	SP3594
Caldecote Hill	Hertfordshire	51.63°N 00.33°W	TQ1594
Caldecott	Rutland	52.52°N 00.73°W	SP8693
Caldecott	Northamptonshire	52.30°N 00.56°W	SP9868
Caldecott	Oxfordshire	51.66°N 01.29°W	SU4996
Caldecotte	Milton Keynes	52.00°N 00.70°W	SP8935
Calder	Cumbria	54.41°N 03.49°W	NY0303
Calderbank	North Lanarkshire	55.83°N 03.98°W	NS7662
Calder Bridge	Cumbria	54.43°N 03.48°W	NY0405
Calderbrook	Rochdale	53.65°N 02.09°W	SD9418
Caldercruix	North Lanarkshire	55.89°N 03.88°W	NS8268
Calder Grove	Wakefield	53.64°N 01.54°W	SE3016
Calder Mains	Highland	58.51°N 03.56°W	ND0959
Caldermill	South Lanarkshire	55.64°N 04.13°W	NS6641
Caldermoor	Rochdale	53.64°N 02.10°W	SD9316
Calderstones	Liverpool	53.37°N 02.90°W	SJ4087
Calder Vale	Lancashire	53.89°N 02.71°W	SD5345
Calderwood	South Lanarkshire	55.76°N 04.16°W	NS6455
Caldey Island	Pembrokeshire	51.63°N 04.68°W	SS142963
Caldhame	Angus	56.62°N 02.86°W	NO4748
Caldicot	Monmouthshire	51.58°N 02.76°W	ST4788
Caldmore	Walsall	52.57°N 01.98°W	SP0197
Caldwell	North Yorkshire	54.51°N 01.75°W	NZ1613
Caldwell	Derbyshire	52.75°N 01.63°W	SK2517
Caldy	Wirral	53.35°N 03.17°W	SJ2285
Cale Green	Stockport	53.38°N 02.16°W	SJ8988
Calenick	Cornwall	50.24°N 05.05°W	SW8243
Calf Heath	Staffordshire	52.67°N 02.10°W	SJ9308
Calf of Eday	Orkney Islands	59.23°N 02.73°W	HY581392
Calf of Flotta	Orkney Islands	58.85°N 03.08°W	ND375966
Calf of Man	Isle of Man	54.05°N 04.81°W	SC160655
Calford Green	Suffolk	52.07°N 00.46°E	TL6945
Calfsound	Orkney Islands	59.21°N 02.75°W	HY5737
Calgary	Argyll and Bute	56.57°N 06.28°W	NM3751
Caliach Point	Argyll and Bute	56.59°N 06.32°W	NM349534
Califer	Moray	57.59°N 03.54°W	NJ0857
California	Cambridgeshire	52.43°N 00.24°E	TL5384
California	Birmingham	52.44°N 01.98°W	SP0183
California	Suffolk	52.05°N 01.17°E	TM1844
California	Norfolk	52.67°N 01.71°E	TG5115
California	Falkirk	55.96°N 03.76°W	NS9076
Calke	Derbyshire	52.79°N 01.45°W	SK3722
Calladrum	Aberdeenshire	57.03°N 02.38°W	NO7794
Callaly	Northumberland	55.37°N 01.92°W	NU0509
Callander	Stirling	56.23°N 04.21°W	NN6307
Callands	Cheshire	53.40°N 02.63°W	SJ5890
Callaughton	Shropshire	52.56°N 02.57°W	SO6197
Callendar Park	Falkirk	55.99°N 03.78°W	NS8979
Callerton	Newcastle upon Tyne	55.00°N 01.73°W	NZ1768
Callerton Lane End	Newcastle upon Tyne	55.01°N 01.75°W	NZ1669
Callestick	Cornwall	50.30°N 05.13°W	SW7750
Calligarry	Highland	57.05°N 05.92°W	NG6203
Callington	Cornwall	50.49°N 04.31°W	SX3669
Callingwood	Staffordshire	52.80°N 01.71°W	SK1923
Calloose	Cornwall	50.16°N 05.37°W	SW5935
Callow	Herefordshire	52.00°N 02.74°W	SO4934
Callow	Derbyshire	53.06°N 01.61°W	SK2652
Callow End	Worcestershire	52.13°N 02.24°W	SO8349
Callow Hill	Herefordshire	51.84°N 02.71°W	SO5116
Callow Hill	Somerset	51.19°N 02.71°W	ST5044
Callow Hill	Wiltshire	51.55°N 01.95°W	SU0384
Callow Hill	Worcestershire	52.35°N 02.38°W	SO7473
Callow Marsh	Herefordshire	52.11°N 02.51°W	SO6546
Calmore	Hampshire	50.92°N 01.51°W	SU3414
Calmsden	Gloucestershire	51.77°N 01.94°W	SP0408
Calne	Wiltshire	51.43°N 02.01°W	ST9971
Calne Marsh	Wiltshire	51.43°N 02.00°W	SU0071
Calow	Derbyshire	53.23°N 01.38°W	SK4171
Calow Green	Derbyshire	53.21°N 01.38°W	SK4169
Calrofold	Cheshire	53.26°N 02.09°W	SJ9474
Calshot	Hampshire	50.80°N 01.33°W	SU4701
Calstock	Cornwall	50.49°N 04.21°W	SX4368
Calstone Wellington	Wiltshire	51.41°N 01.97°W	SU0268
Calthorpe	Oxfordshire	52.04°N 01.33°W	SP4639
Calthorpe	Norfolk	52.83°N 01.23°E	TG1831
Calthwaite	Cumbria	54.75°N 02.84°W	NY4640
Calton	Argyll and Bute	55.42°N 05.62°W	NR7121
Calton	North Yorkshire	54.02°N 02.15°W	SD9059
Calton	Staffordshire	53.04°N 01.85°W	SK1050
Calton	City of Glasgow	55.84°N 04.23°W	NS6064
Calton Lees	Derbyshire	53.20°N 01.62°W	SK2568
Calvadnack	Cornwall	50.17°N 05.23°W	SW6935
Calvay	Western Isles	57.23°N 07.34°W	NF774285
Calve Island	Argyll and Bute	56.61°N 06.04°W	NM521545
Calveley	Cheshire	53.11°N 02.61°W	SJ5958
Calver	Derbyshire	53.26°N 01.64°W	SK2474
Calverhall	Shropshire	52.92°N 02.59°W	SJ6037
Calver Hill	Herefordshire	52.12°N 02.92°W	SO3748
Calverleigh	Devon	50.91°N 03.53°W	SS9214
Calverley	Leeds	53.82°N 01.69°W	SE2036
Calver Sough	Derbyshire	53.27°N 01.64°W	SK2475
Calvert	Buckinghamshire	51.91°N 01.01°W	SP6824
Calverton	Milton Keynes	52.04°N 00.84°W	SP7939
Calverton	Nottinghamshire	53.03°N 01.09°W	SK6149
Calvine	Perth and Kinross	56.76°N 03.96°W	NN8065
Calvo	Cumbria	54.86°N 03.34°W	NY1453

=== Cam ===
Location	Locality	Coordinates (links to map & photo sources)	OS grid reference
Cam	Gloucestershire	51.68°N 02.37°W	ST7499
Camaghael	Highland	56.83°N 05.08°W	NN1276
Camas-luinie	Highland	57.29°N 05.42°W	NG9428
Camasnacroise	Highland	56.61°N 05.50°W	NM8552
Camastianavaig (Camustianavaig)	Highland	57.37°N 06.16°W	NG5039
Camault Muir	Highland	57.42°N 04.50°W	NH5040
Camb	Shetland Islands	60.60°N 01.07°W	HU5192
Cambeak	Cornwall	50.73°N 04.64°W	SX135963
Camber	East Sussex	50.92°N 00.78°E	TQ9618
Camberley	Surrey	51.33°N 00.73°W	SU8860
Camberwell	Southwark	51.47°N 00.08°W	TQ3377
Camblesforth	North Yorkshire	53.72°N 01.03°W	SE6426
Cambo	Northumberland	55.15°N 01.97°W	NZ0285
Cambois	Northumberland	55.14°N 01.53°W	NZ3083
Camborne	Cornwall	50.21°N 05.30°W	SW6440
Cambridge	Cambridgeshire	52.20°N 00.13°E	TL4658
Cambridge	Gloucestershire	51.72°N 02.37°W	SO7403
Cambridge	Scottish Borders	55.72°N 02.67°W	NT5848
Cambridge	Leeds	53.90°N 01.69°W	SE2045
Cambridge Batch	North Somerset	51.41°N 02.69°W	ST5269
Cambridge Town	Essex	51.52°N 00.76°E	TQ9284
Cambrose	Cornwall	50.25°N 05.25°W	SW6845
Cambus	Clackmannan	56.12°N 03.85°W	NS8594
Cambusbarron	Stirling	56.10°N 03.97°W	NS7792
Cambusdrenny	Stirling	56.12°N 04.01°W	NS7594
Cambuskenneth	Stirling	56.12°N 03.93°W	NS8094
Cambuslang	South Lanarkshire	55.80°N 04.17°W	NS6459
Cambusnethan	North Lanarkshire	55.77°N 03.89°W	NS8155
Camden Hill	Kent	51.11°N 00.55°E	TQ7938
Camden Park	Kent	51.11°N 00.27°E	TQ5938
Camden Town	Camden	51.54°N 00.14°W	TQ2984
Cameley	Bath and North East Somerset	51.31°N 02.56°W	ST6157
Camelford	Cornwall	50.61°N 04.68°W	SX1083
Camel Green	Dorset	50.90°N 01.83°W	SU1212
Camelon	Falkirk	55.99°N 03.82°W	NS8680
Camelsdale	West Sussex	51.08°N 00.74°W	SU8832
Camer	Kent	51.37°N 00.36°E	TQ6567
Cameron	Fife	56.17°N 03.06°W	NT3499
Cameron Bridge	Fife	56.17°N 03.06°W	NT3499
Camer's Green	Gloucestershire	52.00°N 02.33°W	SO7734
Camerton	Bath and North East Somerset	51.31°N 02.46°W	ST6857
Camerton	Cumbria	54.65°N 03.50°W	NY0330
Camerton	East Riding of Yorkshire	53.71°N 00.15°W	TA2226
Camesworth	Dorset	50.77°N 02.75°W	SY4797
Cammachmore	Aberdeenshire	57.03°N 02.16°W	NO9094
Cammeringham	Lincolnshire	53.32°N 00.58°W	SK9482
Camnant	Powys	52.19°N 03.33°W	SO0956
Camoquhill	Stirling	56.07°N 04.36°W	NS5389
Camore	Highland	57.88°N 04.07°W	NH7790
Camp	Lincolnshire	53.07°N 00.68°W	SK8854
Campbeltown	Argyll and Bute	55.42°N 05.62°W	NR7120
Camp Corner	Oxfordshire	51.72°N 01.07°W	SP6403
Camperdown	North Tyneside	55.04°N 01.57°W	NZ2772
Camp Hill	Warwickshire	52.52°N 01.51°W	SP3392
Camp Hill	Pembrokeshire	51.78°N 04.74°W	SN1113
Camp Hill	North Yorkshire	54.23°N 01.52°W	SE3182
Camp Hill	Kirklees	53.64°N 01.92°W	SE0516
Camphill	Derbyshire	53.29°N 01.73°W	SK1878
Campion Hills	Warwickshire	52.29°N 01.53°W	SP3266
Campions	Essex	51.78°N 00.14°E	TL4812
Campsall	Doncaster	53.61°N 01.18°W	SE5413
Camps End	Cambridgeshire	52.05°N 00.34°E	TL6142
Campsfield	Oxfordshire	51.83°N 01.33°W	SP4615
Camps Heath	Suffolk	52.48°N 01.69°E	TM5194
Campton	Bedfordshire	52.02°N 00.35°W	TL1338
Camptoun	East Lothian	55.98°N 02.80°W	NT5077
Camptown	Scottish Borders	55.41°N 02.52°W	NT6713
Camp Town	Leeds	53.84°N 01.54°W	SE3039
Camrose	Pembrokeshire	51.84°N 05.02°W	SM9220
Camserney	Perth and Kinross	56.61°N 03.94°W	NN8149
Camus Croise	Highland	57.13°N 05.81°W	NG6911
Camusnagaul	Highland	57.84°N 05.27°W	NH0689
Camusteel	Highland	57.41°N 05.83°W	NG7042
Camusterrach	Highland	57.40°N 05.81°W	NG7141
Camusvrachan	Perth and Kinross	56.59°N 04.24°W	NN6247

=== Can ===
Location	Locality	Coordinates (links to map & photo sources)	OS grid reference
Canada	Hampshire	50.95°N 01.60°W	SU2817
Canada	Lincolnshire	53.49°N 00.31°W	TA1201
Canadia	East Sussex	50.92°N 00.47°E	TQ7417
Canal Foot	Cumbria	54.18°N 03.05°W	SD3177
Canal Side	Doncaster	53.60°N 00.97°W	SE6812
Candlesby	Lincolnshire	53.18°N 00.16°E	TF4567
Candle Street	Suffolk	52.32°N 00.97°E	TM0374
Candy Mill	South Lanarkshire	55.65°N 03.47°W	NT0741
Cane End	Oxfordshire	51.50°N 01.03°W	SU6779
Caneheath	East Sussex	50.84°N 00.20°E	TQ5507
Canewdon	Essex	51.61°N 00.72°E	TQ8994
Canfield End	Essex	51.86°N 00.29°E	TL5821
Canford Cliffs	Poole	50.70°N 01.93°W	SZ0589
Canford Heath	Poole	50.74°N 01.97°W	SZ0294
Canford Magna	Poole	50.78°N 01.95°W	SZ0398
Cangate	Norfolk	52.71°N 01.43°E	TG3219
Canham's Green	Suffolk	52.24°N 01.00°E	TM0565
Canholes	Derbyshire	53.23°N 01.94°W	SK0471
Canisbay	Highland	58.63°N 03.13°W	ND3472
Canklow	Rotherham	53.40°N 01.36°W	SK4290
Canley	Coventry	52.39°N 01.56°W	SP3077
Cann	Dorset	50.98°N 02.18°W	ST8721
Canna	Highland	57.06°N 06.53°W	NG251058
Cannalidgey	Cornwall	50.48°N 04.91°W	SW9369
Cannard's Grave	Somerset	51.16°N 02.54°W	ST6241
Cann Common	Dorset	50.98°N 02.17°W	ST8821
Cannich	Highland	57.33°N 04.77°W	NH3331
Cannington	Somerset	51.14°N 03.07°W	ST2539
Canning Town	Newham	51.51°N 00.01°E	TQ4081
Cannock	Staffordshire	52.68°N 02.03°W	SJ9810
Cannock Wood	Staffordshire	52.70°N 01.94°W	SK0412
Cannon's Green	Essex	51.73°N 00.27°E	TL5706
Cannop	Gloucestershire	51.79°N 02.58°W	SO6011
Canonbie	Dumfries and Galloway	55.07°N 02.95°W	NY3976
Canon Bridge	Herefordshire	52.06°N 02.83°W	SO4341
Canonbury	Islington	51.53°N 00.09°W	TQ3284
Canon Frome	Herefordshire	52.08°N 02.51°W	SO6543
Canon Pyon	Herefordshire	52.12°N 02.79°W	SO4648
Canons Ashby	Northamptonshire	52.14°N 01.16°W	SP5750
Canonsgrove	Somerset	50.98°N 03.12°W	ST2121
Canons Park	Harrow	51.60°N 00.29°W	TQ1891
Canonstown	Cornwall	50.16°N 05.46°W	SW5335
Canterbury	Kent	51.27°N 01.06°E	TR1457
Cantley	Doncaster	53.51°N 01.06°W	SE6202
Cantley	Norfolk	52.57°N 01.51°E	TG3803
Cantlop	Shropshire	52.64°N 02.71°W	SJ5205
Canton	Cardiff	51.47°N 03.21°W	ST1676
Cantraywood	Highland	57.49°N 04.03°W	NH7847
Cantsfield	Lancashire	54.14°N 02.58°W	SD6272
Canvey Island	Essex	51.52°N 00.57°E	TQ788839
Canvey Point	Essex	51.52°N 00.63°E	TQ830837
Canwick	Lincolnshire	53.20°N 00.53°W	SK9869
Canworthy Water	Cornwall	50.69°N 04.52°W	SX2291

=== Cao ===
Location	Locality	Coordinates (links to map & photo sources)	OS grid reference
Caol	Highland	56.83°N 05.11°W	NN1076
Caolas	Argyll and Bute	56.53°N 06.75°W	NM0848
Caolas Scalpaigh	Western Isles	57.88°N 06.70°W	NG2198
Caolas Stocinis (Kyles Stockinish)	Western Isles	57.81°N 06.83°W	NG1391
Caol Ila	Argyll and Bute	55.84°N 06.12°W	NR4269

=== Cap ===
Location	Locality	Coordinates (links to map & photo sources)	OS grid reference
Cape Cornwall	Cornwall	50.12°N 05.70°W	SW356315
Capel	Surrey	51.14°N 00.32°W	TQ1740
Capel	Kent	51.17°N 00.33°E	TQ6344
Capel	Carmarthenshire	51.68°N 04.15°W	SN5101
Capel Bangor	Ceredigion	52.40°N 03.98°W	SN6580
Capel Betws Lleucu	Ceredigion	52.20°N 04.05°W	SN6058
Capel Coch	Isle of Anglesey	53.31°N 04.32°W	SH4582
Capel Cross	Kent	51.13°N 00.44°E	TQ7140
Capel Curig	Conwy	53.10°N 03.91°W	SH7258
Capel Dewi (Aberystwyth)	Ceredigion	52.41°N 04.03°W	SN6282
Capel Dewi (Llandysul)	Ceredigion	52.05°N 04.26°W	SN4542
Capel Dewi	Carmarthenshire	51.85°N 04.22°W	SN4720
Capel Garmon	Conwy	53.07°N 03.77°W	SH8155
Capel Green	Suffolk	52.08°N 01.44°E	TM3649
Capel Gwyn	Isle of Anglesey	53.24°N 04.48°W	SH3475
Capel Gwynfe	Carmarthenshire	51.88°N 03.86°W	SN7222
Capel Hendre	Carmarthenshire	51.78°N 04.04°W	SN5911
Capel Isaac	Carmarthenshire	51.92°N 04.06°W	SN5827
Capel Iwan	Carmarthenshire	51.99°N 04.49°W	SN2936
Capel-le-Ferne	Kent	51.09°N 01.19°E	TR2438
Capel Llanilterne / Capel Llanilltern	The Vale Of Glamorgan	51.50°N 03.31°W	ST0979
Capel Mawr	Isle of Anglesey	53.21°N 04.38°W	SH4171
Capel Parc	Isle of Anglesey	53.34°N 04.34°W	SH4486
Capel Seion	Ceredigion	52.39°N 04.01°W	SN6379
Capel Seion	Carmarthenshire	51.79°N 04.16°W	SN5113
Capel Siloam	Conwy	53.06°N 03.74°W	SH8353
Capel St Andrew	Suffolk	52.07°N 01.45°E	TM3748
Capel St Mary	Suffolk	52.00°N 01.04°E	TM0938
Capel Tygwydd	Ceredigion	52.05°N 04.52°W	SN2743
Capel Uchaf	Gwynedd	53.01°N 04.34°W	SH4349
Capelulo	Conwy	53.26°N 03.89°W	SH7476
Capel-y-ffin	Powys	51.97°N 03.09°W	SO2531
Capel-y-graig	Gwynedd	53.19°N 04.18°W	SH5469
Capenhurst	Cheshire	53.25°N 02.96°W	SJ3673
Capernwray	Lancashire	54.13°N 02.72°W	SD5371
Cape Wrath	Highland	58.62°N 05.00°W	NC258742
Capheaton	Northumberland	55.11°N 01.95°W	NZ0380
Capland	Somerset	50.95°N 02.99°W	ST3018
Cappercleuch	Scottish Borders	55.49°N 03.20°W	NT2423
Capplegill	Dumfries and Galloway	55.36°N 03.35°W	NT1409
Capstone	Kent	51.35°N 00.55°E	TQ7865
Captain Fold	Rochdale	53.58°N 02.22°W	SD8510
Capton	Somerset	51.14°N 03.31°W	ST0839
Capton	Devon	50.36°N 03.64°W	SX8353
Caputh	Perth and Kinross	56.54°N 03.49°W	NO0840
