= Calcutt =

Calcutt, Calcott or Callcott may refer to:

== Places in England ==
- Calcott, Kent
- Calcutt, North Yorkshire
- Calcott, Shropshire
- Calcutt, one of three hamlets comprising Grandborough, Warwickshire
- Calcutt, Wiltshire
- Calcott's Green, Gloucestershire

== Company ==
- Calcott Brothers, former motor vehicle manufacturer in Coventry, England

== People ==
- Augustus Wall Callcott (1779–1844), British landscape painter
- Callcott Reilly (1828–1900), British engineer
- David Calcutt (1930–2004), British barrister and public servant
- Ernie Calcutt (1932–1984), Canadian sports commentator and radio news director
- Florence Callcott (1866–1936), British artist and sculptor, wife of Frederick
- Frederick T. Callcott (1854–1923), British sculptor
- Helen Calcutt (born 1988), British poet and writer
- John Callcott Horsley (1817–1903), English Academic painter of genre and historical scenes, illustrator, and designer of the first Christmas card
- John Wall Callcott (1766–1821), British composer, brother of Augustus Wall Callcott
- William Hutchins Callcott (1807–1882), British composer, son of John Wall Callcott
