= Calcot =

Calcot may refer to:

== Places in England ==
- Calcot, Berkshire
  - Calcot Mill
  - Calcot Park
- Calcot, Gloucestershire, a hamlet in the parish of Coln St Dennis
- Calcot Manor, a historic house 3 miles west of Tetbury, Gloucestershire

== Other ==
- Calçot, a variety of scallion or spring onion
- Calcot Chambre (1573–1635), English parliamentarian

== See also ==
- Calcutt (disambiguation), including Calcott
- Kalkot, a tehsil in northern Pakistan
