= Callow Hill =

Callow Hill may refer to the following places in England:

- Callow Hill, Herefordshire, a location
- Callow Hill, Shropshire, a hill
- Callow Hill, Somerset, a location
- Callow Hill, Wiltshire, a hamlet
- Callow Hill, Worcestershire, a hamlet near Redditch
- Callow Hill, Wyre Forest, a location near Bewdley
