= List of shipwrecks in January 1866 =

The list of shipwrecks in January 1866 includes ships sunk, foundered, grounded, or otherwise lost during January 1866.

== 1 January ==
List of shipwrecks: 1 January 1866
Ship	State	Description
Arbutus	(United Kingdom of Great Britain and Ireland) British North America	The ship was driven ashore near Kilrush, County Clare. She was on a voyage from Limerick to Liverpool, Lancashire.
Ardmore	United Kingdom	The barque was abandoned 20 nautical miles (37 km) north of Arranmore, County Donegal. Her crew were rescued by the steamship Hibernia (United Kingdom). Ardmore was on a voyage from Quebec City, Province of Canada, British North America to Glasgow, Renfrewshire. She came ashore on Tiree, Inner Hebrides on 6 January and was wrecked.
Meridian	United States	The ship was abandoned in the Atlantic Ocean 60 nautical miles (110 km) south south east of Cape Clear Island, County Cork, United Kingdom. Her crew were rescued by the steamship City of Boston (United Kingdom). Meridian was on a voyage from New York City to Liverpool, Lancashire, United Kingdom. She came ashore in Finian's Bay, County Cork on 3 January and was wrecked.
Mincola	(United Kingdom of Great Britain and Ireland) British North America	The ship was driven ashore at Montauk Point, New York, United States. She was on a voyage from Pictou, Nova Scotia to New London, Connecticut. She was refloated and was subsequently towed in to New York City by the steamship Albatross (United States)
Naiad	United Kingdom	The ship was driven ashore and wrecked at Kirkcudbright. She was on a voyage from Prince Edward Island, British North America to Liverpool.
Otillia	United Kingdom	The full-rigged ship was wrecked on the Isle of Gigha, Argyllshire. Her 21 crew survived. She was on a voyage from Quebec City, Province of Canada, British North America to Bristol, Gloucestershire. Otillia floated off on 21 January and was anchored off Gigha.
Sea King	United Kingdom	The ship put in to the Shetland Islands in a waterlogged condition.
Shamrock	United Kingdom	The schooner was abandoned in the North Sea off the coast of Northumberland. She was towed in to Newcastle upon Tyne, Northumberland by the tug Robert Scott (United Kingdom).
Shamrock	United Kingdom	The ship was driven against the pier and sank at Peterhead, Aberdeenshire. She was on a voyage from Sunderland, County Durham to Peterhead.
Unnamed	Flag unknown	The schooner foundered off Robin Hoods Bay, Yorkshire with the loss of all hands.

== 2 January ==
List of shipwrecks: 2 January 1866
Ship	State	Description
Alfaretta	(United Kingdom of Great Britain and Ireland) British North America	The ship was abandoned in the Atlantic Ocean (56°20′N 12°37′W) with the loss of two of the sixteen people on board. Survivors were rescued by the brig Peerless (United Kingdom). Alfaretta was on a voyage from Quebec City, and/or Dalhousie, New Brunswick, Province of Canada to Liverpool, Lancashire.
Empire Queen	United Kingdom	The ship was beached in the Rhymney River. She was on a voyage from Cardiff, Glamorgan to Rio de Janeiro, Brazil. She had been struck by a sea and severely damaged by 18 January.
Henry Taylor	United Kingdom	The brig was wrecked on the Gunfleet Sand, in the North Sea off the coast of Essex. Her crew survived.
Inverugie	United Kingdom	The ship was run ashore in the Bay of Smoegro, Orkney Islands.
Margaretta	United Kingdom	The ship was abandoned in Ballydonegan Bay. She was on a voyage from Quebec City to Torquay, Devon. She drove ashore and was wrecked.
Mary Winch	United Kingdom	The brig was wrecked on the Gunfleet Sand. Her crew were rescued. She was on a voyage from Hartlepool, County Durham to London.
Pleiades	(United Kingdom of Great Britain and Ireland) British North America	The full-rigged ship was abandoned in the Atlantic Ocean. Her crew were rescued by the steamship St. Andrew ( (United Kingdom of Great Britain and Ireland) British North America). Pleiades was on a voyage from Richibucto, New Brunswick to Belfast, County Antrim. She was towed in to Londonderry the next day by a tug.
Quintus	United Kingdom	The brig was abandoned off Dungeness, Kent. Her crew were rescued. She was on a voyage from Poole, Dorset to London.
Sarah Emma	United Kingdom	The ship was driven ashore and wrecked at Dingle, County Kerry. She was on a voyage from Miramichi, New Brunswick, British North America to Queenstown, County Cork.
Thurcaston	(United Kingdom of Great Britain and Ireland) British North America	The ship was abandoned in the Atlantic Ocean (42°00′N 33°50′W). Her crew were rescued by Tricolor (United States). Thurcaston was on a voyage from Quebec City, Province of Canada to Queenstown, County Cork. She was still afloat on 14 May.
Lizard Lifeboat	Royal National Lifeboat Institution	The lifeboat capsized off the coast of Cornwall with the loss of three of her ten crew.

== 3 January ==
List of shipwrecks: 3 January 1866
Ship	State	Description
Albion	United Kingdom	The ship was wrecked near Stromness, Orkney Islands with the loss of ten lives. A man on a boat from Graemsay was also lost whilst attempting to rescue survivors. More than 60 survivors were rescued by the paddle steamer Royal Mail (United Kingdom). Albion was on a voyage from Liverpool, Lancashire to New York, United States. She broke up on 7 January.
August	Hamburg	The barque was driven ashore and wrecked 4 nautical miles (7.4 km) west of Newhaven, Sussex, United Kingdom with the loss of a crew member. She was on a voyage from Peru to Hamburg.
Barbara	United Kingdom	The ship was driven ashore in Trebetherick Bay. She was refloated on 18 January.
Challenge	United Kingdom	The brigantine was wrecked on the Kentish Knock. Her six crew were rescued by the smack Queen Victoria (United Kingdom). Challenge was on a voyage from Newcastle upon Tyne, Northumberland to Poole, Dorset.
Fairfax	United States	The steamship was destroyed by fire at Washington, Virginia.
Fisgard	United Kingdom	The schooner was driven ashore at Newton-by-the-Sea, Northumberland. She was driven higher up the beach on 17 January and was severely damaged.
Fortschritt	Flag unknown	The ship was driven ashore at Bilbao, Spain. Her crew were rescued. She was on a voyage from Newcastle upon Tyne to Bilbao.
Gratitude	United Kingdom	The 195-foot (59 m), 1,311-ton square-rigged packet ship was abandoned in the Atlantic Ocean and sank due to storm damage in deep water about 900 nautical miles (1,700 km; 1,000 mi) east of Boston, Massachusetts, at 41°30′N 53°00′W. All 304 people on board were rescued by the barque Fredonia (United Kingdom). Gratitude was on a voyage from Liverpool to New York, New York, United States.
Great Northern	United Kingdom	The steamship sank in the North Sea. Her sixteen crew took to two boats. Eight in the longboat were rescued, the rest reached "Bjergaara", Denmark. She was on a voyage from Newcastle upon Tyne to Tønning, Duchy of Holstein.
Isadore	United Kingdom	The ship ran aground at Miragoâne, Haiti. She was consequently condemned.
Kensington	United Kingdom	The ship ran aground and was wrecked on the Longsand, in the North Sea off the coast of Essex. She was on a voyage from London to Madras, India.
Lucetta	United Kingdom	The barque was wrecked on the Gunfleet Sand, in the North Sea off the coast of Essex. She was on a voyage from Seaham, County Durham to Rochester, Kent.
Marie René	France	The ship struck a submerged object 24 nautical miles (44 km) south south east of Great Yarmouth, Norfolk, United Kingdom and was damaged. She was on a voyage from Goole, Yorkshire, United Kingdom to Honfleur, Manche. She put in to Great Yarmouth in a leaky condition.
Mary	United Kingdom	The fishing smack foundered off Dunoon, Argyllshire. Her three crew survived. She was on a voyage from the Kyles of Bute to Glasgow, Renfrewshire.
Mary Winks	United Kingdom	The ship was wrecked on the Gunfleet Sand, in the North Sea off the coast of Suffolk. Her five crew survived.
Otter	(United Kingdom of Great Britain and Ireland) British North America	The barque was wrecked in Clew Bay. Her eight crew were rescued by a lifeboat. She was on a voyage from Philadelphia, Pennsylvania, United States to Havre de Grâce, Seine-Inférieure, France.
Pearl	United Kingdom	The schooner ran aground on the Stoney Binks, in the North Sea off the mouth of the Humber. She was on a voyage from Honfleur, Manche, France to Goole. She was refloated and taken in to Grimsby, Lincolnshire in a leaky condition.
Roe	United Kingdom	The schooner was wrecked on the Kentish Knock. Her four crew were rescued by the smack Queen Victoria (United Kingdom). Roe' was on a voyage from Whitby, Yorkshire to London.
Scotland	United Kingdom	The ship was wrecked in Dingle Bay. Her 32 crew survived. She was on a voyage from Calcutta, India to London. She was towed in to Queenstown, County Cork by the tug Perseverance (United Kingdom) on 15 January in a crippled condition.

== 4 January ==
List of shipwrecks: 4 January 1866
Ship	State	Description
Cesarine	United Kingdom	The ship was driven ashore near Peel, Isle of Man.
Entracht	Kingdom of Hanover	The ship departed from Hartlepool, County Durham, United Kingdom for Bremerhaven. No further trace, presumed foundered with the loss of all hands.
Inigo	(Ottoman Empire) Egypt	The steamship was wrecked at "Sonakim", Ottoman Empire, Sixty-one passengers were rescued.
James Hendry	United Kingdom	The brigantine ran aground in Kilchattan Bay. She was on a voyage from Saint John's, Newfoundland, British North America to Greenock, Renfrewshire. She was refloated and completed her voyage.
Jeannie	United Kingdom	The sloop was driven ashore and wrecked in Ross Bay, Kirkcudbrightshire. Her crew were rescued. She was on a voyage from Washington to Wigtown.
Marquis of Worcester	United Kingdom	The ship arrived at Stanley, Falkland Islands on fire. She was on a voyage from Swansea, Glamorgan to Valparaíso, Chile. She underwent temporary repairs to enable her to return to Swansea in ballast.
Messenger	United Kingdom	The brig sprang a leak and foundered in the North Sea off Flamborough Head, Yorkshire. Her crew were rescued by the smack Liberty (United Kingdom). Messenger was on a voyage from Sunderland, County Durham to Bordeaux, Gironde, France.
USS Narcissus	United States Navy	The Tug was wrecked at Egmont Key, Florida, and sank with the loss of all hands.
Trident	Hamburg	The ship ran aground in the River Usk. She was on a voyage from Cartagena, Spain to Newport, Monmouthshire, United Kingdom. She was refloated and taken in to Newport in a severely leaky condition.
Ville d'Autrain	France	The ship put in to Cherbourg, Seine-Inférieure in a sinking condition. She was on a voyage from Pontorson, Manche to Ipswich, Suffolk, United Kingdom.

== 5 January ==
List of shipwrecks: 5 January 1866
Ship	State	Description
Blue Bonnet	United Kingdom	The tug suffered a boiler explosion at Blyth, Northumberland.
Euphemia	United Kingdom	The brig was wrecked by an explosion in her cargo of coal at Hartlepool, County Durham.
Hannah	United Kingdom	The schooner sprang a leak and sank in the North Sea with the loss of four of her five crew. The survivor was rescued by the brigantine Jane (United Kingdom). Hannah was on a voyage from Sunderland, County Durham to Colchester, Essex.
R. B Boggs	United States	The ship was abandoned off "Nanset". Her crew were rescued by R. J. Leonard (United States). R. B. Boggs was on a voyage from Providence to Granville, Nova Scotia, British North America.
Unnamed	United Kingdom	The smack was destroyed by fire at Oban, Argyllshire.

== 6 January ==
List of shipwrecks: 6 January 1866
Ship	State	Description
Cayenne	(United Kingdom of Great Britain and Ireland) Jamaica	The brig was wrecked on the Long Cay, off the Bahamas. She was on a voyage from Aux Cayes, Haiti to New York, United States.
Cook	United Kingdom	The collier was driven ashore near Wells-next-the-Sea, Norfolk.
Crusader, and Earl of Elgin	(United Kingdom of Great Britain and Ireland) Jersey; United Kingdom	The brig Crusader collided with the steamship Earl of Elgin and sank in the North Sea 17 nautical miles (31 km) north by west of the Dudgeon Lightship ( Trinity House) with the loss of a crew member. Survivors were rescued by the Gorleston Lifeboat. She was on a voyage from Jersey to South Shields, County Durham. Earl of Elgin was severely damaged. She was on a voyage from Sunderland, County Durham to London.
Delia	United Kingdom	The ship was abandoned off Colonsay, Inner Hebrides. Her crew were rescued by the tug Flying Childers (United Kingdom). Delia was on a voyage from Quebec City, Province of Canada, British North America to Plymouth, Devon. She came ashore in Loch Tarbert and was wrecked.
George and Mary	United Kingdom	The collier was driven ashore near Wells-next-the-Sea.
Halcyon	United Kingdom	The barque ran aground at Nassau, Bahamas. She was on a voyage from Liverpool, Lancashire to New Orleans, Louisiana, United States. She was refloated and found to be severely leak. She was taken in to Nassau for repairs.
Hilda	Belgium	The ship was driven ashore and wrecked at Løkken-Vrå, Denmark. Her crew were rescued.
Janet Kidston	United States	The brig was driven ashore and wrecked 50 nautical miles (93 km) south of Cape Henry, Virginia. She was on a voyage from Cornwallis, Nova Scotia, British North America to Baltimore, Maryland.
Landschipping	United Kingdom	The schooner collided with Alice Williams (United Kingdom) and sank off the Mumbles, Glamorgan. Her crew were rescued.
Melrose	United States	The schooner was wrecked on Inagua, Bahamas. She was on a voyage from New York to Inagua.
Swinemünde	Prussia	The barque was driven ashore at "Hammermühle". She was on a voyage from Sunderland, County Durham, United Kingdom to Swinemünde. She was refloated and taken in to Helsingør, Denmark.

== 7 January ==
List of shipwrecks: 7 January 1866
Ship	State	Description
Cambrian Packet	United Kingdom	The ship was driven ashore at Waterloo, Lancashire.
Elizabeth and Christine	United Kingdom	The ship was driven ashore on Dragør, Denmark. She was on a voyage from Danzig to Waterford. She was refloated on 13 January and taken in to Copenhagen, Denmark for repairs.
Freedom	United Kingdom	The smack was wrecked at The Needles, Isle of Wight with the loss of one of her two crew. She was on a voyage from Plymouth, Devon to Portsmouth, Hampshire. The survivor was rescued by the Totland Lifeboat. Freedom was subsequently towed in to Yarmouth, Isle of Wight.
Friend of All Nations	Royal National Lifeboat Institution	The lifeboat capsized whilst going to the assistance of Rambler (United Kingdom). Her crew were rescued. Friend of all Nations was subsequently taken in to Margate, Kent by a lugger.
Jane and Ann	United Kingdom	The brig ran aground on the Sizewell Bank, in the North Sea off the coast of Suffolk. She was on a voyage from Middlesbrough, Yorkshire to London. She was refloated and taken in to Lowestoft, Suffolk in a leaky condition.
Palinurus	United States	The ship was wrecked in the Cymryan Strait with the loss of a crew member. Survivors were rescued by a fishing boat. She was on a voyage from Liverpool, Lancashire to New York.
Panther	United Kingdom	The steamship collided with Antelope (United Kingdom) and sank with the loss of a crew member.
Pattie Martin	United States	The schooner was wrecked in the Hatteras Inlet with the loss of two of her five crew. The survivors were rescued on 12 January by a pilot boat. She was on a voyage from a port in New Jersey to Hatteras Island, North Carolina.
Rambler	United Kingdom	The brig ran aground on the Margate Sand. She was on a voyage from Wells-next-the-Sea, Norfolk to Neath, Glamorgan. She was refloated with the assistance of a steamship and taken in to Ramsgate, Kent in a leaky condition.
Reform	United Kingdom	The trawler was abandoned in the Bristol Channel off Clevedon, Somerset.
St. Patrick	United Kingdom	The sloop was wrecked on the Barnhoorie Bank, in the Irish Sea with the loss of two of her three crew. The survivor was rescued from the wreck by the Coastguard on 10 January. She was on a voyage from Bangor, Caernarfonshire to Silloth, Cumberland.
Triton	Prussia	The ship ran aground on the Pluckington Bank, in Liverpool Bay. She was on a voyage from New York to Liverpool. She was refloated with assistance from the tug Columbus (United Kingdom) and taken in to Liverpool.
Witch of the Seas	United Kingdom	The ship departed from Queenstown for London. No further trace, presumed foundered with the loss of all hands.

== 8 January ==
List of shipwrecks: 8 January 1866
Ship	State	Description
Alpha	United Kingdom	The schooner was driven ashore at Helsingør, Denmark. She was on a voyage from Riga, Russia to Hull, Yorkshire.
Avalon	United Kingdom	The steamship ran aground on the Schoar. She was on a voyage from Harwich, Essex to Brielle, South Holland, Netherlands.
Christiana	United States	The ship was abandoned in the Atlantic Ocean. Her crew were rescued by Varuna (United Kingdom). Christiania was on a voyage from London, United Kingdom to New York.
Come-on	United Kingdom	The brig ran aground on the Gunfleet Sand, in the North Sea off the coast of Essex. She was refloated with assistance but then ran aground on the Andrews Sand. Refloated again, Come-on was found to be leaky and was beached at Harwich, Essex. She was on a voyage from Sunderland, County Durham to London.
Elizabeth	United Kingdom	The ship was driven ashore at Ayr. She was on a voyage from Belfast, County Antrim to Ayr. She was refloated on 17 January and towed in to Ayr.
Escort	United Kingdom	The ship was holed by ice at New York, United States and was beached. She was on a voyage from Liverpool, Lancashire to New York.
Favourite	United Kingdom	The fishing smack was wrecked on the Trinity Sand, in the North Sea off the coast of Lincolnshire. Her crew survived.
James Foster, Jr.	United States	The clipper ran aground in the River Mersey. She was on a voyage from Liverpool to New York. She was refloated with the assistance of two tugs and towed back to Liverpool.
Louisa	United Kingdom	The schooner was driven ashore and severely damaged at Douglas, Isle of Man. She was on a voyage from Liverpool to Montevideo, Uruguay.
Margaret	United Kingdom	The ship was wrecked near Castletown, Isle of Man. Her crew survived.
Red Jacket	United Kingdom	The ship foundered in Ballinskelligs Bay, County Kerry.
Singapore	United Kingdom	The schooner ran aground on Taylor's Bank, in Liverpool Bay and sank with the loss of two of her crew. Survivors were rescued by the Liverpool No.2 Lifeboat. Singapore was on a voyage from Liverpool to Singapore, Straits Settlements.
Sir Robert Peel	United Kingdom	The ship was wrecked on the Bawdsey Sand, in the North Sea off the coast of Suffolk. Her crew were rescued. She was on a voyage from Hartlepool, County Durham to London.
Wahorne	United Kingdom	The ship ran aground on the Newcombe Sand, in the North Sea off the coast of Suffolk. She was on a voyage from Woodbridge, Suffolk to Goole, Yorkshire.
Unnamed	Flag unknown	The ship foundered off the Calf of Man, Isle of Man with the loss of all on board.

== 9 January ==
List of shipwrecks: 9 January 1866
Ship	State	Description
Argonaut	United Kingdom	The full-rigged ship was driven ashore and wrecked on South Uist, Outer Hebrides. Her crew survived. She was on a voyage from Saint John, New Brunswick, British North America to Greenock, Renfrewshire. She broke in two on 21 February.
Bonanza	United Kingdom	The barque was driven ashore and wrecked at Barry Island, Glamorgan with the loss of nine of her twelve crew. She was on a voyage from Newport, Monmouthshire to the Cape of Good Hope, Cape Colony.
Brothers	United Kingdom	The brig was abandoned in the North Sea 50 nautical miles (93 km) south east of the Lemon and Ower Sand. Her crew were rescued by the smack Harriett Todd (United Kingdom). Brothers was on a voyage from South Shields, County Durham to London.
Clarinda	United Kingdom	The ship ran aground on Scroby Sands, Norfolk. She was on a voyage from London to South Shields, County Durham. She was refloated and assisted in to Great Yarmouth, Norfolk.
Fiducia	Flag Unknown	The ship foundered in the Irish Sea off the coast of Lancashire, United Kingdom.
Jacoba	Netherlands	The full-rigged ship foundered in Tor Bay with the loss of all but one of her crew. She was on a voyage from Montevideo, Uruguay to Silloth, Cumberland, United Kingdom.
Noemi	Austrian Empire	The barque sprang a leak and was beached at Y Rhiw, Caernarfonshire, United Kingdom. Her crew were rescued. She was on a voyage from Brăila, Ottoman Empire to Dublin. United Kingdom.
Prudhoe	United Kingdom	The barque foundered in the Irish Sea off the coast of Lancashire with the loss of all fourteen crew. She was on a voyage from Liverpool, Lancashire to Shanghai, China.
William	United Kingdom	The smack foundered in Stokes Bay. Her crew were rescued.
William and Mary	(United Kingdom of Great Britain and Ireland) New Zealand	The schooner was being towed to sea at Greymouth by the tug Lioness. The tug, through the pilot's inattention, drifted too far north causing the William and Mary to ground. Owing to the heavy swell, the Lioness was forced to cut the schooner loose.

== 10 January ==
List of shipwrecks: 10 January 1866
Ship	State	Description
Abeona	United Kingdom	The ship was wrecked in Tor Bay. Her crew were rescued.
Agia Trias	Kingdom of Greece	The ship was wrecked at Civitavecchia, Papal States. She was on a voyage from Berdyansk, Russia to an English port.
Alarm	United Kingdom	The smack was driven ashore at Portland, Dorset. She had been refloated by 15 January.
Albion	United Kingdom	The ship was driven ashore in Tor Bay. Her crew were rescued.
Alexander	United Kingdom	The schooner was driven ashore at Portland. She had been refloated by 15 January.
Alona	United Kingdom	The ship was driven ashore and wrecked at Brixham, Devon. Her crew were rescued.
Alexander	United Kingdom	The schooner was driven ashore at Portland. She had been refloated by 15 January.
Amanda	United Kingdom	The smack was driven ashore at Portland. She had been refloated by 15 January.
Amanda	United Kingdom	The brigantine sank or was driven ashore in Tor Bay with the loss of five of her eight crew.
Arrow	United Kingdom	The ketch was driven ashore at Portland.
Belle	France	The fishing trawler was wrecked in Tor Bay. Her crew were rescued.
Bessie Simmonds	United Kingdom	The sloop was driven ashore at Portland. She was on a voyage from Southampton, Hampshire to Par, Cornwall. She was refloated the next day and taken in to Weymouth, Dorset.
Blue Jacket	United Kingdom	The schooner was wrecked in Tor Bay. Her crew were rescued. She was refloated on 13 January.
Britannia	United Kingdom	The ship was wrecked at Brixham with the loss of four of her crew.
Briton	United Kingdom	The fishing trawler was wrecked in Tor Bay. Her crew were rescued.
Cambodia	United Kingdom	The barque was severely damaged at Penarth, Glamorgan when the full-rigged ship Telegraph (United Kingdom) was driven into her.
Cambria	United Kingdom	The ship was wrecked in Tor Bay. Her six crew were rescued. She was on a voyage from Exmouth, Devon to Port Talbot, Glamorgan.
Charlotte	(United Kingdom of Great Britain and Ireland) Guernsey	The smack was driven ashore at Portland. She had been refloated by 15 January.
Cheshire Witch	United Kingdom	The brig was driven ashore in Tor Bay with the loss of three of her six crew. Survivors were rescued by the Teignmouth Lifeboat China ( Royal National Lifeboat Institution).
Colonel Buller	United Kingdom	The fishing trawler was wrecked in Tor Bay. Her three crew took to a boat, but it capsized and they drowned.
Courrier	Prussia	The brigantine sank in Tor Bay with the loss of two of her crew.
Dorset	United Kingdom	The ship was driven ashore at Broadsands. Her crew were rescued.
Drian	France	The brig was driven ashore and wrecked at Brixham. Her crew were rescued. She was on a voyage from Jersey, Channel Islands to Cardiff, Glamorgan.
Elizabeth	United Kingdom	The schooner was lost in Tor Bay with the loss of all hands. She was on a voyage from Lewes, Sussex to Nantes, Loire-Inférieure, France.
Elizabeth Lewis	United Kingdom	The ship was driven ashore in Tor Bay. Her crew were rescued.
Ellen	United Kingdom	The sloop sank in Tor Bay. She had been refloated by 20 January and taken in to Brixham.
Emilie and Charles	France	The brigantine was driven ashore and wrecked at Broadsands. Her crew were rescued. She was on a voyage from Ardrossan, Ayrshire, United Kingdom to the Charente.
Ernest	United Kingdom	The fishing trawler was wrecked in Tor Bay. Her crew were rescued.
Forerunner	United Kingdom	The fishing trawler was wrecked in Tor Bay. Her crew were rescued.
Fortitude	United Kingdom	The schooner was driven ashore at Broadsands.
George	United Kingdom	The smack was driven ashore and severely damaged at Larne, County Antrim.
Grace	United Kingdom	The fishing trawler was wrecked in Tor Bay. Her crew were rescued.
Hannah Moore	United Kingdom	The full-rigged ship was driven ashore and wrecked on Rat Island, Devon with the loss of nineteen of her 25 crew. Survivors were rescued by a lifeboat. She was on a voyage from Callao, Peru to Queenstown, County Cork.
Hanover	Kingdom of Hanover	The brig was driven ashore and wrecked at Broadsands with the loss of her captain. She was on a voyage from Rouen, Seine-Inférieure, France to Malbis, Alabama, United States.
Helen	United Kingdom	The fishing trawler was wrecked in Tor Bay. Her crew were rescued.
Honour	United Kingdom	The ship was driven ashore in Tor Bay. Her crew were rescued. She subsequently became a wreck.
Horror	United Kingdom	The brigantine was wrecked in Tor Bay. Her crew were rescued.
I'll Away	United Kingdom	The ship was driven ashore at Plymouth, Devon. She was on a voyage from Antwerp, Belgium to Liverpool. She was refloated.
James	United Kingdom	The schooner was driven ashore and wrecked at Goodrington, Devon. She was on a voyage from Rouen and/or Havre de Grâce, Seine-Inférieure to Liverpool, Lancashire.
James	United Kingdom	The ship sank in Tor Bay.
Jane and Anne	United Kingdom	The brigantine sank in Tor Bay.
Jessie	United Kingdom	The ship was wrecked in Tor Bay with the loss of all but one of her six crew. She was on a voyage from Exmouth, Devon to Neath, Glamorgan.
John Fyffe, and Natolia	United States; United Kingdom	The full-rigged ship John Fyffe was driven into Natolia at Greenock, Renfrewshire. Both vessels were severely damaged.
Kezia Page	United Kingdom	The brigantine was driven onto the Copt Rocks. She was on a voyage from Newcastle upon Tyne, Northumberland to Folkestone, Kent. She was refloated and taken in to Folkestone.
La Immacolata Concezione	Papal Navy	The corvette was driven into the steamship Aunis (France) at Civitavecchia.
Laurel	United Kingdom	The schooner was driven ashore at Sea Palling, Norfolk. Her three crew were rescued by the Palling Lifeboat Parsee ( Royal National Lifeboat Institution). Laurel was on a voyage from Goole, Yorkshire to London.
Leonie	Belgium	The barque was driven ashore in Tor Bay. Her crew were rescued.
Lively	United Kingdom	The fishing trawler was wrecked in Tor Bay. Her crew were rescued.
Maria Jaine	Netherlands	The ship was driven ashore and wrecked on Heligoland. Her crew survived. She was on a voyage from Emden, Kingdom of Hanover to Faversham, Kent.
Mary Ann	United Kingdom	The brigantine was wrecked in Tor Bay with the loss of three of her crew. She was on a voyage from Southampton, Hampshire to Newport, Monmouthshire.
Mary Elizabeth	United Kingdom	The ship was driven ashore at Clovelly, Devon. She was refloated.
Minda	United Kingdom	The ship was driven ashore and wrecked in Tor Bay. Three crew were rescued.
Minerva	United Kingdom	The ship was driven ashore at Portland. She was refloated the next day. She had been refloated by 15 January.
Occidentale	United Kingdom	The barque foundered in Tor Bay with the loss of all sixty people on board. She was on a voyage from Havre de Grâce to Martinique.
Palmer	Netherlands	The brig was wrecked near Islay, Inner Hebrides, Unitedl Kingdom with the loss of three of the nine people on board. She was on a voyage from Jamaica to Liverpool
Princess Beatrice	United Kingdom	The barque sank at Brixham. Her crew were rescued. She was on a voyage from Odesa, Russia to Dublin. She was refloated on 20 January.
Providence	United Kingdom	The fishing trawler was wrecked in Tor Bay. Her crew were rescued by another vessel.
Providence	United Kingdom	The ship sank in Tor Bay.
Richard	United Kingdom	The ship sank in Tor Bay. She was on a voyage from Havre de Grâce to Liverpool.
Salem	United Kingdom	The fishing trawler was wrecked in Tor Bay. Her crew were rescued.
Santissima Trinidad	Greece	The ship foundered at Civitavecchia. Her crew were rescued. She was on a voyage from Berdyansk, Russia to a British port. Santissima Trinidad was refloated on 20 January and taken in to Civitavecchia for repairs.
Sarah	United Kingdom	The schooner was driven ashore and wrecked at Portland. Her crew survived. She had been refloated by 15 January.
Scythian	United Kingdom	The ship was wrecked in Tor Bay. Her crew were rescued. She was on a voyage from Exmouth to Port Talbot.
Silvanus	United Kingdom	The ship sank in Tor Bay.
Sky	United Kingdom	The fishing trawler was wrecked in Tor Bay. Her crew were rescued.
Sophia Austen	United Kingdom	The ship sank in Tor Bay.
Southerly	United Kingdom	The ship sank in Tor Bay. She was on a voyage from Exmouth to a French port.
Speranza	Greece	The brig was driven ashore and wrecked on Lefkada. Her crew were rescued.
Stanley	United Kingdom	The barque was driven ashore and wrecked at Broadsands. She was on a voyage from Brăila, Ottoman Empire to Waterford.
Telegram	United Kingdom	The fishing trawler, a sloop was wrecked in Tor Bay. Her crew were rescued. She had been refloated by 20 January and taken in to Brixham.
Thessidore	United Kingdom	The brig was driven ashore at Great Yarmouth, Norfolk. Her eight crew were rescued by the Coastguard using rocket apparatus. She was on a voyage from Sunderland, County Durham to London.
Tom and Mary	United Kingdom	The schooner was wrecked at Brixham. Her crew were rescued. She was on a voyage from Guernsey, Channel Islands to Cardiff. She had been refloated by 20 January with assistance from the sloop Phantom (United Kingdom).
Turk	United Kingdom	The smack was driven ashore at Portland. She had been refloated by 15 January.
Useful	United Kingdom	The brig ran aground at Brixham. Her crew were rescued. She was refloated on 13 January and taken in to Brixham.
Wild Rose	United Kingdom	The barque was wrecked at Brixham. Her eleven crew were rescued. She was on a voyage from Odesa to Dublin. She was refloated on 2 February and taken in to Brixham.
Zoe	United Kingdom	The brigantine was wrecked in Tor Bay with the loss of six of the nine people on board. She was on a voyage from Plymouth to Cardiff.
Zouave	United Kingdom	The brig was driven ashore and wrecked at Elbury, Devon with the loss of six of her ten crew.
Saltash Ferry	United Kingdom	The ferry sank at its moorings.
Unnamed	Flag unknown	The steamship foundered in Tor Bay with the loss of all hands.
Unnamed	France	The brigantine was driven ashore at Broadsands.
Unnamed	Flag unknown	The schooner was driven ashore and wrecked at Churston, Devon.
Unnamed	Flag unknown	The schooner was driven ashore at Churston.
Eleven unnamed vessels	Flags unknown	The ships were driven ashore at Elbury with some loss of life.
Militades	Greece	The ship was wrecked at Scutari.
Unnamed	France	The schooner collided with the brig Joaquim (Spain) and sank off Alicante, Spain. Her crew were rescued by Joaquim.

== 11 January ==
List of shipwrecks: 11 January 1866
Ship	State	Description
Alexis Marie	France	The schooner was driven ashore and wrecked at Broadsands Devon, United Kingdom. Her crew were rescued. She was on a voyage from Jersey, Channel Islands to Saint-Quay-Portrieux, Côtes-du-Nord, France.
Bessie	United Kingdom	The collier, a steamship, was driven ashore and wrecked between Hayle and Porthminster, Cornwall. Her nine crew were rescued by the Penzance Lifeboat Richard Lewis and the St. Ives Lifeboat (both Royal National Lifeboat Institution). Bessie was on a voyage from a Welsh port to Hayle.
Bonita	United Kingdom	The smack collided with another vessel in Tor Bay and was abandoned. Her crew were rescued by the other vessel.
Cheval Trois	France	The ship was driven ashore and wrecked at Guernsey, Channel Islands. Her crew were rescued. She was on a voyage from Havre de Grâce, Seine-Inférieure to Swansea, Glamorgan, United Kingdom.
Cruiser	United Kingdom	The ship collided with the schooner Percy (United Kingdom) and sank at Harwich, Essex. Her crew were rescued by Percy. Cruiser was on a voyage from West Hartlepool, County Durham to Ipswich, Suffolk.
Diana, and Gadabout	United Kingdom	The schooner Gadabout collided with the brig Diana and sank at Lowestoft, Suffolk. Her crew were rescued. Diana was severely damaged.
Ellen Edwards	United Kingdom	The ship was driven ashore and wrecked in Tor Bay with the loss of two of her crew. She was on a voyage from Dunkirk, Nord, France to Liverpool.
Emerald	United Kingdom	The brig ran aground at Hartlepool, County Durham. She was on a voyage from Hartlepool to London. She was refloated and taken in to South Shields, County Durham in a leaky condition.
Emile and Charles	France	The ship was driven ashore and wrecked at Brixham. She was on a voyage from Ardrossan, Ayrshire, United Kingdom to the Charente. She had been refloated by 2 March and taken in to Teignmouth, Devon.
Eugene Felix	France	The lugger was driven ashore and wrecked at Boulogne-sur-Mer, Pas-de-Calais. She was on a voyage from Sunderland, County Durham to Boulogne.
Express	United Kingdom	The ship ran aground at Gibraltar. She was on a voyage from Sulina, Ottoman Empire to Queenstown, County Cork. She was refloated with assistance from the steamship Lion Belge (Belgium).
Fal	United Kingdom	The tug sank at Falmouth, Cornwall.
Falcon	United Kingdom	The schooner was driven ashore and wrecked at Salthouse, Norfolk. Her crew were rescued. She was on a voyage from Hartlepool, County Durham to Sandwich, Kent.
Fessonia	United Kingdom	The ship departed from Sunderland for Civita Vecchia, Papal States. Presumed subsequently foundered with the loss of all hands; a boat washed up at Pellworm, Duchy of Schleswig on 9 February.
Fre Mad	Norway	The brigantine was driven ashore at Kingsgate, Kent, United Kingdom. Her seven crew were rescued by the Kingsgate Lifeboat. She was on a voyage from London to Messina, Sicily, Italy. Fre Mad was refloated on 15 January and taken in tow for London.
Goodwin Light	United Kingdom	The ship ran aground and sank on the Heaps Sand, in the North Sea off the coast of Essex with the loss of a crew member. She was on a voyage from Seaham, County Durham to Rochester, Kent.
Grace	United Kingdom	The ship was driven ashore at Lowestoft, Suffolk. She was on a voyage from South Shields, County Durham to London. She was refloated and taken in to Lowestoft in a leaky condition.
Hope	United Kingdom	The ship was in collision with a cutter and was consequently beached at Walmer, Kent. Her crew were rescued. She was on a voyage from Sunderland to Fécamp, Seine-Inférieure.
Izri	United Kingdom	The smack was abandoned in the North Sea. Her crew were rescued.
Jessy	United Kingdom	The brig was driven ashore at Brixham, Devon with the loss of five of her crew. Eight survivors were rescued by the Teignmouth Lifeboat China ( Royal National Lifeboat Institution).
Julia, or Julia C. McLean	United Kingdom	The schooner was wrecked off Happisburgh, Norfolk. Her crew were rescued by the Palling Lifeboat. She was on a voyage from Bo'ness, Lothian to Great Yarmouth, Norfolk. She was refloated in mid-February and beached at Sea Palling.
Lady of the Lake	(United Kingdom of Great Britain and Ireland) Jersey	The smack was run into by Abeona (United Kingdom) and was then driven against the pier and wrecked at Brixham. Her crew were rescued. She was on a voyage from Brixham to Guernsey, Channel Islands.
Lavina	United Kingdom	The brigantine was wrecked at Fresh Water Point, Newfoundland, British North America with the loss of four of her crew. She was on a voyage from Cádiz, Spain to Saint John's, Newfoundland.
Lisbonnaise	France	The schooner was driven ashore at Great Yarmouth. She was on a voyage from Sunderland to Dunkirk, Nord.
London	United Kingdom	1887 illustration of London sinking. The passenger-cargo auxiliary screw steamship sank in the Bay of Biscay. In heavy gales masts and booms were swept away and considerable water entered the engine-room, extinguishing the fires. Of about 270 people on board, only 19 survived. They took to a cutter and were rescued the next day by the barque Marianople (Italy). London was on a voyage from London to Melbourne, Victoria.
Louise Marie	France	The chasse-marée was driven ashore at Cowes, Isle of Wight, United Kingdom. She was refloated with assistance from HMS Research (Royal Navy).
Maple Valley	(United Kingdom of Great Britain and Ireland) British North America	The ship was abandoned 6 nautical miles (11 km) west north west of Scarba, Argyllshire. Her crew were rescued by the steamship Islesman (United Kingdom). Maple Valley was on a voyage from Saint John, New Brunswick to Cork. She came ashore in Loch Tarbert.
Monda	United Kingdom	The ship was driven ashore at Brixham, Devon with the loss of five lives. She was on a voyage from London to Berbice, British Guiana.
Naiad	United Kingdom	The schooner was driven into the barque Ubriksen (Norway) at Falmouth and was severely damaged.
Paquebot No. 1	France	The ship ran aground and sank in Tor Bay. She was on a voyage from Saint-Malo, Ille-et-Vilaine to Bristol, Gloucestershire, United Kingdom.
Phœnix	United Kingdom	The tug was driven ashore on Islay, Inner Hebrides.
Pomona	United Kingdom	The ship was driven ashore at Portland. She was on a voyage from Weymouth, Dorset to "Hegle". She was refloated and put back to Weymouth.
Providence	United Kingdom	The brig was driven ashore at Boulogne with the loss of one of her seven crew. Survivors were rescued by the Boulogne Lifeboat.
Sally	United Kingdom	The brigantine was beached at Hull, Yorkshire and was abandoned by her crew.
Silentium	Netherlands	The barque was driven into the barques Home and Stanton (both United Kingdom) and was damaged at Falmouth.
Stanley	United Kingdom	The barque ran aground on the Platters Sand. She was on a voyage from Odesa, Russia to Ipswich. She was refloated with the assistance of three smacks and taken in to Harwich in a leaky condition.
Sovereign	United Kingdom	The schooner was driven ashore and wrecked at Great Yarmouth. Her crew were rescued.
Tangerine	United Kingdom	The schooner was driven ashore at Brixham. She was on a voyage from London to São Miguel Island, Azores. She was refloated and taken in to Brixham.
Thoughtful	United Kingdom	The brig was driven ashore and wrecked at Great Yarmouth. Her eight crew were rescued by the Great Yarmouth Lifeboat. She was on a voyage from Sunderland, County Durham to London.
Titania	United Kingdom	The brigantine foundered in the North Sea off Cromer, Norfolk with the loss of her pilot. Her crew were rescued by Ann (United Kingdom). Titania was on a voyage from Sunderland to Rio de Janeiro, Brazil.
Tordenskjold	Flag unknown	The ship was blown out to sea from Santa Cruz de Tenerife, Canary Islands. No further trace, presumed foundered.
Unition	(United Kingdom of Great Britain and Ireland) Guernsey	The brig was driven ashore at Lowestoft.
Wave	(United Kingdom of Great Britain and Ireland) Guernsey	The schooner was driven ashore at Cowes. She was on a voyage from Santander, Spain to Newcastle upon Tyne, Northumberland. She was refloated with assistance from HMS Research (Royal Navy).
Western Queen	United Kingdom	The barque was driven ashore and damaged at Bideford, Devon.
Zephyr	United Kingdom	The schooner was wrecked on the Goodwin Sands, Kent. Her six crew were rescued by the lugger Champion (United Kingdom). Zephyr was on a voyage from Newcastle upon Tyne, Northumberland to Lisbon, Portugal.
Unnamed	Flag unknown	The barque was driven ashore at Kingsdown, Kent.
Unnamed	Flag unknown	The schooner was driven ashore at Ryde, Isle of Wight.
Two unnamed vessels	Flag unknown	The sloops sank in the Bristol Channel off Portishead, Somerset.
Unnamed	Flag unknown	The schooner was driven ashore in Walton Bay, Somerset.
Three unnamed vessels	France	The fishing boats were driven ashore at Boulogne.
Unnamed	Flag unknown	The ship sank at Yorkshire with the loss of two lives.

== 12 January ==
List of shipwrecks: 12 January 1866
Ship	State	Description
Adele	France	The ship was driven ashore at Cherbourg, Seine-Inférieure. She had been refloated by 19 January and taken in to Cherbourg.
Alcyon	United Kingdom	The ship was driven ashore at Cherbourg. She was on a voyage from Plymouth, Devon to Saint-Malo, Ille-et-Vilaine, France. She had been refloated by 19 January and taken in to Cherbourg, but sank there.
Alerte	France	The ship was driven ashore at Cherbourg. She was on a voyage from Viviers to Plymouth. She had been refloated by 19 January and taken in to Cherbourg.
Amalia	United Kingdom	The steamship foundered in the Bay of Biscay. All on board were rescued by the steamship Laconia (United Kingdom). Amalia was on a voyage from Liverpool, Lancashire to Malta.
Anna	United Kingdom	The ship was wrecked near Clevedon, Somerset. Her crew were rescued. She was on a voyage from Newport, Monmouthshire to Bristol, Gloucestershire.
Badanza	United Kingdom	The ship was wrecked on Barry Island, Glamorgan.
Cyclops	United Kingdom	The ship departed from Bombay, India for Liverpool. No further trace, presumed foundered with the loss of all hands.
Dewdrop	(United Kingdom of Great Britain and Ireland) Jersey	The dandy was abandoned in the Atlantic Ocean. Her crew were rescued. She was on a voyage from Seville, Spain to Dundee, Forfarshire.
Dorothea	United Kingdom	The barque ran aground on the Goodwin Sands, Kent and sank. Her crew were rescued by the tug Aid (United Kingdom).
Ellen	United Kingdom	The schooner was driven ashore near Portsmouth, Hampshire. She was on a voyage from Portsmouth to Southampton, Hampshire. She was refloated the next day and taken in to Portsmouth.
Emily	United Kingdom	The ship was driven ashore at Cap La Hougue, Manche, France. She was on a voyage from London to Cardiff, Glamorgan. She was refloated and made for Cherbourg.
Eugene Felix	France	The ship was driven ashore and wrecked at Boulogne, Pas-de-Calais. Her six crew were rescued. She was on a voyage from Sunderland, County Durham, United Kingdom to Boulogne.
Gaspard	France	The ship was driven ashore at Cherbourg.
Harriett	United Kingdom	The schooner was driven ashore at Margate, Kent. She was refloated on 14 January.
Industry	United Kingdom	The ship was wrecked at Clevedon. Her crew were rescued. She was on a voyage from Newport to Bristol.
Jeune Louis	France	The ship was driven ashore at Cherbourg.
Louis and Fanny	France	The ship was driven ashore at Cherbourg. She was on a voyage from Rouen, Seine-Inférieure to Cardiff.
Lusitanie	France	The schooner was driven ashore in Loch Long. She was on a voyage from Greenock, Renfrewshire, United Kingdom to Cardiff. She was refloated and put back to Greenock.
Marie and Fanny	France	The schooner was driven ashore at Cherbourg. She was on a voyage from Dunkirk, Nord to Liverpool. She had been refloated by 19 January and taken in to Cherbourg.
Old Honesty	United Kingdom	The barque was wrecked on the Goodwin Sands. Her eleven crew survived. She was on a voyage from Sunderland to Malta.
Onward	United Kingdom	The schooner was driven ashore at Margate. She was refloated on 14 January.
Pyrame	France	The ship was driven ashore in Tor Bay. She was on a voyage from Saint-Malo to Newport. She was refloated on 18 January and taken in to Plymouth.
Royal Sailor	United Kingdom	The brig was driven ashore at Camden Point, County Cork. She was on a voyage from Berdyansk, Russia to Dublin. She was refloated on 13 January and towed in to Queenstown, County Cork.
Sally	United Kingdom	The brigantine ran aground on the Hull Sand and was abandoned by her crew. She was on a voyage from Newcastle upon Tyne, Northumberland to King's Lynn, Norfolk.
Sarah Ann	United Kingdom	The trow sank off Portishead, Somerset. Her crew survived.
Simeon Hardy	United Kingdom	The ship was driven ashore and wrecked at Kingsdown, Kent. Her crew were rescued. She was on a voyage from London to Havre de Grâce, Seine-Inférieure.
Swallow	United Kingdom	The trow sank off Portishead. Her crew survived.
Talbot	United Kingdom	The trow sank off Portishead. Her crew survived.
Thomas and Maria	United Kingdom	The ship was driven ashore at Clevedon. Her crew were rescued. She was on a voyage from Newport to Bristol. She was later refloated and completed her voyage.
Three Brothers	United Kingdom	The schooner was driven ashore at Calderfoot, Cumberland.
Victorine	Belgium	The barque was wrecked at Souter Point, Northumberland. Her eleven crew were rescued by the ferry Robert Chambers, the tugs Reynard, Robert Scott and William (all United Kingdom) and the South Shields Lifeboat. Victorine was on a voyage from Rotterdam, South Holland, Netherlands to the River Tyne.
Volunteer	(United Kingdom of Great Britain and Ireland) British North America	The brig foundered in the Atlantic Ocean (41°55′N 10°30′W). She was on a voyage from Sunderland to Saint John, New Brunswick.
Ystavets	United Kingdom	The ship was driven ashore at Deal, Kent. She was on a voyage from London to Cardiff.
Unnamed	United Kingdom	The trow foundered off Portishead. Her crew were rescued. She was on a voyage from Lydney, Gloucestershire to Bridgwater, Somerset.
Unnamed	United Kingdom	The sloop foundered in Walton Bay, Somerset with the loss of one of her four crew.

== 13 January ==
List of shipwrecks: 13 January 1866
Ship	State	Description
Bansvale	United Kingdom	The schooner ran aground on Taylor's Bank, in Liverpool Bay and sank. Both crew were rescued by the trawl boat Alice (United Kingdom). Bansvale was on a voyage from Barrow-in-Furness to Garston, Lancashire.
Billy	United Kingdom	The brig ran aground and sank off Southwold, Suffolk with the loss of all hands.
Black Agnes	United Kingdom	The schooner was wrecked at Peterhead, Aberdeenshire. Her three crew were rescued by the Peterhead Lifeboat. She was on a voyage from South Shields, County Durham to the Moray Firth.
Bonny	United Kingdom	The ship ran aground on the Formby Bank, in Liverpool Bay. Her crew were rescued by the Formby Lifeboat. She was on a voyage from Preston, Lancashire to Birkenhead, Cheshire.
Brien Boru	United Kingdom	The ship was driven ashore at Ayr. She was on a voyage from Belfast, County Antrim to Ayr. She was refloated the next day and taken in to Ayr.
Charlotte	United Kingdom	The ketch collided with a foreign brig off Beachy Head, Sussex and was abandoned with the loss of a crew member. She was on a voyage from South Shields to Poole, Dorset. She was towed in to Ramsgate, Kent the next day by the steamship Pioneer (United Kingdom).
Concordia	United Kingdom	The paddle steamer was driven ashore and wrecked at Wimereux, Pas-de-Calais, France. She was on a voyage from London to Boulogne, Pas-de-Calais.
Condor	United States	The schooner was driven ashore at Scutari, Ottoman Empire.
Fanny	United Kingdom	The brigantine was driven ashore at Pakefield, Suffolk. She was on a voyage from Maldon, Essex to Newcastle upon Tyne, Northumberland. She was refloated on 18 January and put back to Maldon.
Fortuna	United Kingdom	The brig was driven ashore and wrecked at Dunman Head, Mull of Galloway. Her crew were rescued. She was on a voyage from Whitehaven, Cumberland to Cardiff, Glamorgan.
Indian	United Kingdom	The brig was run down and sunk in the River Tyne by the steamship Earl Percy (United Kingdom). Her crew were rescued.
James Hall, Margaret Ann, and San Luis	United Kingdom; United Kingdom; Hamburg	San Luis heeled over at Dover, Kent severely damaging James Hall and sinking Margaret Ann. San Luis was on a voyage from Laguna to Hamburg.
Kurrachee	United Kingdom	The ship ran aground off Lamlash, Isle of Arran. She was on a voyage from Greenock, Renfrewshire to Point de Galle, Ceylon. She was refloated with assistance from the tug Jasper (United Kingdom) and found to be leaky.
Marianna	Belgium	The barque was driven ashore and wrecked at Whitburn, County Durham. Her nine crew were rescued by the North Shields and South Shields Lifeboats. She was on a voyage from Rotterdam, South Holland, Netherlands to the River Tyne.
Martha	United Kingdom	The schooner sprang a leak and foundered in the North Sea 60 nautical miles (110 km) east south east of Lowestoft, Suffolk. Her crew were rescued by the smacks Island Queen and Sailor (both United Kingdom). Martha was on a voyage from Maldon, Essex to Stockton-on-Tees, County Durham.
Osep	Austrian Empire	The brig was wrecked on the Holm Sand, in the North Sea off the coast of Suffolk with the loss of four of the twelve people on board. Survivors were rescued by the Lowestoft Lifeboat. She was on a voyage from Kavarna, Ottoman Empire to Hartlepool, County Durham.
Osier	United Kingdom	The schooner was driven ashore at Portpatrick, Wigtownshire. Her crew were rescued by the Coastguard using rocket apparatus. She was on a voyage from Belfast to Workington, Cumberland.
Outtan	United Kingdom	The ship was driven ashore and wrecked at Llaniland, Anglesey. She was on a voyage from Bangor, Caernarfonshire to Bristol, Gloucestershire.
Pelion	United Kingdom	The brig was driven ashore at Flamborough Head, Yorkshire. Her crew survived. She was on a voyage from London to Hartlepool.
Rescuer	United Kingdom	The lifeboat capsized at Gorleston, Suffolk with the loss of twelve of her sixteen crew. Survivors were rescued by the lifeboat Friend of All Nations (United Kingdom). Rescuer was going to the aid of Nathaniel (United Kingdom) which was in distress having sailed from Havre de Grâce, Seine-Inférieure, France for North Shields, Northumberland unballasted.
Rose Bud	United Kingdom	The brig ran aground on the Gunfleet Sand, in the North Sea off the coast of Essex. She was on a voyage from Middlesbrough, Yorkshire to London. She was refloated with the assistance of five smacks and assisted in to Harwich, Essex.
Salt	United Kingdom	The schooner ran aground on Taylor's Bank, in Liverpool Bay and sank.
Tower	United Kingdom	The sloop sank in Liverpool Bay. Both crew were rescued by the trawl boat Alice (United Kingdom). Tower was on a voyage from Barrow-in-Furness, Lancashire to Woodside, Cheshire.
West Kent	United Kingdom	The brig was wrecked on the Cross Sand, in the North Sea off the coast of Norfolk with the loss of her captain. She was on a voyage from Sunderland, County Durham to Tunbridge, Kent.
W F Storer	United States	The ship ran aground on the Pluckington Bank, in Liverpool Bay. She was on a voyage from New York to Liverpool, Lancashire, United Kingdom. She was refloated and taken in to Birkenhead, Cheshire, United Kingdom.
Wilhelm	Kingdom of Hanover	The schooner ran aground on the Shipwash Sand, in the North Sea off the coast of Suffolk. She was on a voyage from Newcastle upon Tyne, Northumberland, United Kingdom to Papenburg. She was refloated and taken in to Great Yarmouth, Norfolk, United Kingdom.
William and Nancy	United Kingdom	The ship was driven ashore at Wigtown. She was on a voyage from "Crutown" to Swansea, Glamorgan.
Unnamed	Greece	The ship was driven ashore at Scutari.

== 14 January ==
List of shipwrecks: 14 January 1866
Ship	State	Description
Arno, and Medina	United Kingdom	The brig Medina was run into by the steamship Arno and sank in the North Sea off the coast of Yorkshire with the loss of four of her ten crew. Survivors were rescued by Arno. Medina was on a voyage from Berdyansk, Russia to Leith, Lothian. Arno was on a voyage from Leith to London. Severely damaged at the bows, 48 of the 60 people on board took to the lifeboats and were rescued by the full-rigged ship Flying Cloud (United Kingdom). Arno consequently foundered; those on board were rescued by the steamship Conservator and the tug Wizard (both United Kingdom).
Bermuda	United Kingdom	The ship was wrecked on Barra, Outer Hebrides with the loss of a crew member. She was on a voyage from Greenock, Renfrewshire to Trinidad.
Clorinda Wallace	United Kingdom	The ship ran aground on Scroby Sands, Norfolk. She was refloated and taken in to Great Yarmouth.
Conquest	(United Kingdom of Great Britain and Ireland) British North America	The ship was driven ashore and wrecked 3 nautical miles (5.6 km) from the Ruvaal Lighthouse, Islay. She was on a voyage from New York, United States to Falmouth, Cornwall.
Ernst von Homeyer	Prussia	The barque was driven ashore at Brindisi, Italy. She was on a voyage from Trieste to Falmouth or Queenstown, County Cork, United Kingdom.
General Sheridan	United States	The schooner was lost off Cape Canso. Four of the crew were lost.
Hazlewood	United Kingdom	The schooner was driven ashore and wrecked at Southerness, Dumfries-shire. Her crew were rescued. She was on a voyage from Whitehaven, Cumberland to Ramsey, Isle of Man.
Malvina Davies	United Kingdom	The ship was driven ashore on the coast of Dorset. She was on a voyage from Poole, Dorset to Runcorn, Cheshire. She was refloated and put in to Weymouth, Dorset in a leaky condition.
Marianne	Prussia	The barque ran aground on the Noorder Haaks Bank, in the North Sea. She was on a voyage from Memel to London.
Ocean Bride	United Kingdom	The schooner was driven ashore and wrecked near Langton Matravers, Dorset with the loss of a crew member. She was on a voyage from Waterford to Portsmouth, Hampshire.
Ruby	United Kingdom	The ship was driven ashore in Mossel Bay. She had become a wreck by 10 February.

== 15 January ==
List of shipwrecks: 15 January 1866
Ship	State	Description
Alfred and Fanny	France	The ship was run down and sun by a brig. Her crew were rescued by Louisa (United Kingdom). Alfred and Fanny was on a voyage from Poole, Dorset, United Kingdom to Caen, Calvados.
Bessie	United Kingdom	The brig ran aground at Savannah, Georgia, United States and was severely damaged. She was on a voyage from Saint John, New Brunswick, British North America to Savannah. She was refloated and taken in to Savannah for repairs.
Confidence	United Kingdom	The ship was abandoned in the North Sea 50 nautical miles (93 km) east north east of Tynemouth, Northumberland. Her crew were rescued by the brig Apollo (Sweden).
Earl of Auckland	United Kingdom	The steamship foundered off Hellevoetsluis, Zeeland, Netherlands. Her crew survived.
Hamilton	(United Kingdom of Great Britain and Ireland) Barbados	The brig ran aground on the Skullmartin Rocks, in the Belfast Lough. Her crew survived.
James Gann	United Kingdom	The sailing barge sank off the Isle of Sheppey, Kent.
Jenny	Norway	The barque was driven ashore at Swansea, Glamorgan, United Kingdom. She was on a voyage from Swansea to Genoa, Italy.
New Eagle	United Kingdom	The sloop caught fire and was run ashore at Grimsby, Lincolnshire. Her crew were rescued. She was on a voyage from Goole, Yorkshire to Thornham, Norfolk.
Sarah Jane	United Kingdom	The Yorkshire Billyboy was abandoned off Cromer, Norfolk. Her crew were rescued. She was on a voyage from Tetney, Lincolnshire to London.
Setubal	United Kingdom	The steamship was driven ashore at Deal, Kent. She was on a voyage from London to Lisbon, Portugal. She was refloated with assistance.
St. George	(United Kingdom of Great Britain and Ireland) Guernsey	The brig was driven ashore at Boulogne-sur-Mer, Pas-de-Calais, France with the loss of all hands.
Ville d'Avranche	France	The ship departed from Saint-Malo, Ille-et-Vilaine for Penzance, Cornwall, United Kingdom. No further trace, presumed foundered with the loss of all hands.
Unnamed	United Kingdom	The brig was driven ashore at Formby, Lancashire.

== 16 January ==
List of shipwrecks: 16 January 1866
Ship	State	Description
Emily	United Kingdom	The ship was driven ashore in Loch Indaal. She was on a voyage from Liverpool, Lancashire to Londonderry.
Engolf	Norway	The schooner was wrecked on the Goodwin Sands, Kent, United Kingdom. Her crew were rescued.

== 17 January ==
List of shipwrecks: 17 January 1866
Ship	State	Description
Aurora	United Kingdom	The ship departed from Boston, Lincolnshire for Sunderland, County Durham. No further trace, presumed foundered with the loss of all hands.
Lowther	United Kingdom	The barque was run into by the steamship Calypso (United Kingdom) and sank at Plymouth, Devon. She was on a voyage from Plymouth to Dublin. Also reported as having been sunk in the River Usk whilst on a voyage from Newport, Monmouthshire to Dublin. She was refloated on 6 March.
Margaret Ann	United Kingdom	The schooner was driven ashore and wrecked at Cairnbulg, Aberdeenshire. She was on a voyage from Port Dinorwic, Caernarfonshire to Stockton-on-Tees, County Durham.
Northern Light	(United Kingdom of Great Britain and Ireland) British North America	The schooner sprang a leak and was beached on Rum Cay, Bahamas. She was on a voyage from Miragoâne, Haiti to Boston, Massachusetts, United States.
Onward	United Kingdom	The schooner was driven ashore at Speymouth, Moray.
Royal Albert	United Kingdom	The ship was wrecked in Bude Bay, Cornwall with the loss of all 38 crew. She was on a voyage from Calcutta, India to London.
Scotia	United Kingdom	The schooner collided with the barque Ghilino (Kingdom of Italy) off Lindisfarne, Northumberland and was severely damaged. She was assisted in to Eyemouth, Berwickshire in a waterlogged condition. Scotia was on a voyage from Aberdeen to Newcastle upon Tyne, Northumberland.
Whampoa	Netherlands	The ship ran aground on the Zuidwal, in the Wadden Sea. She was on a voyage from Batavia, Netherlands East Indies to Amsterdam, North Holland.

== 18 January ==
List of shipwrecks: 18 January 1866
Ship	State	Description
Brothers	United Kingdom	The ship was driven ashore in the Dardanelles. She was on a voyage from Brăila, Ottoman Empire to an English port. She was refloated on 24 January and towed in to Constantinople, Ottoman Empire by a steamship.
County of Argyle, and Helen Baird	United Kingdom	The barque Helen Baird collided with the full-rigged ship County of Argyll and sank in the Irish Sea off the Tuskar Rock. Her crew were rescued by County of Argyll. Helen Baird was on a voyage from Greenock, Renfrewshire to Singapore, Straits Settlements. County of Argyle was on a voyage from Glasgow, Renfrewshire to Batavia, Netherlands East Indies and Singapore. She was towed in to Greenock in a sinking condition the next day by the tug Flying Childers (United Kingdom) and collided with the steamship Princess Royal (United Kingdom). County of Argyle was beached near Cartsdyke, Renfrewshire. She was subsequently refloated and taken in to Greenock.
Jubilee	United Kingdom	The ship was driven ashore at Shanghai, China. She was on a voyage from London to Shanghai.
Powerful	Brazil	The steamship was lost south of Rio Grande with the loss of 23 lives. She was on a voyage from Rio de Janeiro to the River Plate.
Shannon	United Kingdom	The ship was wrecked on a reef off Diego Garcia. She was on a voyage from Liverpool, Lancashire to Bombay, India.
Tartar	United Kingdom	The collier ran aground on the Cockle Sand, in the North Sea off the coast of Norfolk.

== 19 January ==
List of shipwrecks: 19 January 1866
Ship	State	Description
Countess of Durham	United Kingdom	The ship was wrecked on a reef off Barbados. All on board, her crew and 520 coolies, survived. She was on a voyage from Calcutta, India to Saint Vincent, Grenada and Demerara.
Rover's Bride	United Kingdom	The ship was wrecked on "Buenayre Island" (Bonaire). She was on a voyage from Liverpool, Lancashire to Curaçao. The crew survived but the master was drowned.

== 20 January ==
List of shipwrecks: 20 January 1866
Ship	State	Description
Alina	United Kingdom	The ship was driven ashore on Ameland, Friesland, Netherlands. She was on a voyage from Newcastle upon Tyne, Northumberland to Zierikzee, Zeeland, Netherlands.
Berdinkha	United Kingdom	The ship ran aground on the Brake Sand. She was on a voyage from South Shields, County Durham to Cartagena, Spain. She was refloated and assisted in to Ramsgate, Kent, where she was scuttled.
Berta	Austrian Empire	The barque was wrecked near Santoña, Spain. She was on a voyage from Ardrossan, Ayrshire, United Kingdom to Civitavecchia, Papal States.
Charles Williams	United Kingdom	The schooner was abandoned in the Atlantic Ocean. Her crew were rescued by the barque George S. Hunt (United States).
Chittham	United Kingdom	The ship ran aground at Great Yarmouth, Norfolk. She was on a voyage from Alexandria, Egypt to Great Yarmouth. She was refloated.
Commissioner	United Kingdom	The paddle tug collided with the steamship Margaret (United Kingdom) and sank in the River Tyne, Her crew were rescued. She was subsequently refloated, repaired and returned to service.
James Hay	United Kingdom	The brigantine was driven ashore and wrecked at Bootle, Cumberland. She was on a voyage from Liverpool, Lancashire to "Gaboon".
Martha	(United Kingdom of Great Britain and Ireland) New Zealand	The schooner went aground while trying to cross the rivermouth bar at Greymouth. She was stuck fast, and all attempts to free her failed.

== 21 January ==
List of shipwrecks: 21 January 1866
Ship	State	Description
Asia	United Kingdom	The ship was driven ashore and wrecked on Heligoland. Her crew were rescued. She was on a voyage from Newcastle upon Tyne, Northumberland to Cuxhaven.
Chieftain	United Kingdom	The ship struck a sunken rock off the Isle of Mull. She was on a voyage from Riga, Russia to Belfast, County Antrim. She put in to the Caledonian Canal in a severely leaky condition. She was subsequently towed to the Clyde for repairs.
Dunmore	United Kingdom	The barque ran aground at Cairston, Orkney Islands. She was on a voyage from Sunderland, County Durham to Singapore, Straits Settlements. She was refloated and taken in to Stromness, Orkney Islands.
George	United Kingdom	The schooner ran aground on Scroby Sands, Norfolk. Her crew were rescued by the Great Yarmouth Lifeboat. George was refloated with assistance from the Caister Lifeboat and towed in to Great Yarmouth, Norfolk.
John Cockrell	United Kingdom	The ship struck a sunken wreck at Buenos Aires, Argentina and was damaged. She was beached on 23 January in a severely leaky condition. John Cockrell was consequently condemned.
Miami	United States	The steamboat was destroyed by a boiler explosion in the Arkansas River upstream of Napoleon, Tennessee with the loss of about 150 lives.
Mustang	United States	The ship was wrecked. She was on a voyage from San Francisco, California to a port in Victoria.

== 22 January ==
List of shipwrecks: 22 January 1866
Ship	State	Description
Adelaide	United Kingdom	The ship ran aground at Great Yarmouth, Norfolk. She was on a voyage from Newcastle upon Tyne, Northumberland to Exmouth, Devon. She was refloated and towed in to Great Yarmouth.
Czar	United Kingdom	The steamship was driven ashore at Theddlethorpe, Lincolnshire. She was on a voyage from Bordeaux, Gironde, France to Hull, Yorkshire. After discharging cargo, she was refloated on 25 January and resumed her voyage.
Dinanais	France	Sailing from Dinan, Côtes-du-Nord, the ship ran aground on the coast of Saint Ouen, Jersey, Channel Islands.
Harmony	United Kingdom	The ship was wrecked in Tallisher Bay, Isle of Skye.
Rozere	United Kingdom	The ship was wrecked on Islay, Inner Hebrides. She was on a voyage from New Orleans, Louisiana, United States to Liverpool, Lancashire.

== 23 January ==
List of shipwrecks: 23 January 1866
Ship	State	Description
Conquest	United Kingdom	The brig was driven ashore near Portaskaig, Islay. She was on a voyage from New York, United States to Liverpool, Lancashire.
Trial	United Kingdom	The schooner ran aground on the Sow and Pigs Rocks, on the coast of Northumberland. She was on a voyage from Dundee, Forfarshire to Blyth, Northumberland. She was refloated the next day and taken in to Blyth.

== 24 January ==
List of shipwrecks: 24 January 1866
Ship	State	Description
Alphonsine	France	The ship foundered off the Calf of Man, Isle of Man with loss of life.
Coquette	(United Kingdom of Great Britain and Ireland) British North America	The brig was driven ashore and wrecked in the Sound of Islay. She was on a voyage from "Crowell" to Yarmouth, Nova Scotia.
Kate and Jane	United Kingdom	The schooner collided with Ann (United Kingdom) and sank in the English Channel between Fairlight, Sussex and Dungeness, Kent with the loss of two of her crew. Survivors were rescued by Ann. Kate and Jane was on a voyage from Stockton-on-Tees, County Durham to Newport, Monmouthshire.
Rosina	United Kingdom	The ship capsized at Passage West, County Cork. She was subsequently righted.

== 25 January ==
List of shipwrecks: 25 January 1866
Ship	State	Description
Anna Marie	France	The schooner collided with the brigantine Maria (United Kingdom) and sank in the Bristol Channel. Her crew were rescued.
Delgada	United Kingdom	The schooner was wrecked on São Jorge Island, Azores. Her crew were rescued.
Equator	United Kingdom	The ship was sighted off Land's End, Cornwall whilst on a voyage from the River Tyne to Alexandria, Egypt. No further trace, presumed foundered with the loss of all hands.
Nora Creina	United Kingdom	The ship departed from Viana do Castelo, Portugal for Saint John's, Newfoundland, British North America. No further trace, presumed foundered with the loss of all hands.
Roscoe	United Kingdom	The ship ran aground and was wrecked in Loch Indaal. All 32 people on board were rescued. She was on a voyage from New Orleans, Louisiana, United States to Liverpool, Lancashire.

== 26 January ==
List of shipwrecks: 26 January 1866
Ship	State	Description
Emma	United Kingdom	The ship was wrecked at Rio Grande, Brazil. Her crew were rescued. She was on a voyage from Rio de Janeiro to Rio Grande.
Princess Alexandra	United Kingdom	The steamship ran aground south of Amager, Denmark.
Roscarne	(United Kingdom of Great Britain and Ireland) Victoria	The schooner was wrecked in the Kent Group, Tasmania. Her crew were rescued. She was on a voyage from Hokitika, New Zealand to Melbourne.
Theodore Knoop	United States	The ship was run into by the steamship Sherman (United States) at the mouth of the Mississippi River and was severely damaged. She was on a voyage from Liverpool, Lancashire, United Kingdom to New Orleans, Louisiana.
William Hunter	United Kingdom	The steamship ran aground on the Chapman Head Sand, in the Thames Estuary.

== 27 January ==
List of shipwrecks: 27 January 1866
Ship	State	Description
Canton	United Kingdom	The schooner ran aground on Filey Brigg. She was on a voyage from Seaham, County Durham to Leigh-on-Sea, Essex. She was refloated with assistance from the tug Kate (United Kingdom) and assisted in to Scarborough, Yorkshire, where she sank.

== 28 January ==
List of shipwrecks: 28 January 1866
Ship	State	Description
Palmerston	United Kingdom	The ship foundered in the Atlantic Ocean (31°50′N 34°41′W). All 29 people on board were rescued by Trois Sœurs (France).
No. 2	France	The pilot boat was run down and sunk in the Gironde by the steamship Biddick (United Kingdom).

== 29 January ==
List of shipwrecks: 29 January 1866
Ship	State	Description
Alabama	United States	The steamship ran aground on the Punta Reefs, off the coast of Cuba. She was on a voyage from New Orleans, Louisiana to Havana, Cuba and Liverpool, Lancashire, United Kingdom. She was refloated and taken in to Havana, sailing for Liverpool on 2 February.
Lord Hawkesbury	United Kingdom	The cutter foundered off the South Foreland, Kent. Her crew were rescued. She was on a voyage from London to Lisbon, Portugal.
Margaret and Rachel	United Kingdom	The ship ran aground on the Great Burbo Bank, in Liverpool Bay. She was on a voyage from Caen, Calvados, France to Liverpool, Lancashire. She was refloated but capsized and was beached at Otterspool.
Myrtle	United Kingdom	The ship ran aground in the Savannah River. She was on a voyage from Savannah, Georgia, United States to Liverpool, Lancashire She was refloated and resumed her voyage.
Redman Pratt	United Kingdom	The ship was driven ashore in Ballinskelligs Bay. Her crew were rescued. She was on a voyage from Liverpool, Lancashire to Baltimore, Maryland, United States.
Volta	United Kingdom	The barque was driven ashore near Algeciras, Spain. She was on a voyage from Almería, Spain to Newcastle upon Tyne, Northumberland.
W. H. Jenkins	United States	The ship ran aground in the Savannah River. She was on a voyage from Savannah to Liverpool.

== 30 January ==
List of shipwrecks: 30 January 1866
Ship	State	Description
Ann Millicent	United Kingdom	The ship caught fire at Galle, Ceylon. She was on a voyage from Liverpool, Lancashire to Bombay, India. The fire was extinguished and she resumed her voyage.
Benedetto	Italy	The barque collided with Cylypso (United Kingdom) and sank off the South Foreland, Kent, United Kingdom.
George Krell	Hamburg	The ship sank between Banco Chico and Punta de India. She was on a voyage from Rosario, Brazil to an English port.
Globe	(United Kingdom of Great Britain and Ireland) British North America	The ship was severely damaged by an onboard explosion at Newport, Monmouthshire. She was on a voyage from Newport to the West Indies.
Jane Hughes	United Kingdom	The ship was driven ashore at Boulmer, Northumberland. She was on a voyage from Hartlepool, County Durham to Leith, Lothian. She was refloated and out in to Warkworth, Northumberland.
Missouri	United States	The steamboat was destroyed by a boiler explosion in the Ohio River upstream of Evansville, Indiana with the loss of about 65 lives. Some of the survivors were rescued by the steamboat Dictator (United States).

== 31 January ==
List of shipwrecks: 31 January 1866
Ship	State	Description
Catherine	United Kingdom	The brig was driven ashore and damaged at Saltcoats, Ayrshire. She was on a voyage from Teignmouth, Devon to Glasgow, Renfrewshire.
Dragon	United Kingdom	The steamship ran aground on the Doom Bar. She was on a voyage from Cardiff, Glamorgan to the Charente.
Fama	United Kingdom	The ship ran aground off Birkenhead, Cheshire. She was on a voyage from Liverpool, Lancashire to Constantinople, Ottoman Empire. She was refloated the next day and taken in to Birkenhead.
John Chisholm, and Helen McGregor	France; United Kingdom	The barque John Chisholm ran aground at Sunderland, County Durham. The tug Helen McGregor went to her assistance but ran aground and sank. Her crew were rescued. John Chisholm was later refloated with assistance from other steamships and was towed in to Sunderland.
London	United Kingdom	The ship was wrecked near Ceuta, Spain. Her crew were rescued. She was on a voyage from Alexandria, Egypt to Newcastle upon Tyne, Northumberland.
Mildmay	United Kingdom	The barque ran aground in the Haslar Creek. She was on a voyage from Newcastle upon Tyne to Portsmouth, Hampshire.
Paulina	France	The schooner was wrecked on the Cross Sand, in the North Sea off the coast of Norfolk, United Kingdom. Her crew were rescued. She was on a voyage from Grangemouth, Stirlingshire, United Kingdom to Honfleur, Manche.
Royal Union	United Kingdom	The collier, a brig, ran aground and was wrecked on the Corton Sand, in the North Sea off the coast of Suffolk. Her crew were rescued. She was on a voyage from Sunderland, County Durham to Calais, France.
Witton Castle	United Kingdom	The brig was driven ashore at Bridlington, Yorkshire. She was on a voyage from London to South Shields, County Durham. She was refloated and resumed her voyage.

== Unknown date ==
List of shipwrecks: Unknown date in January 1866
Ship	State	Description
Albro	United Kingdom	The ship was destroyed by fire at Loanda, Portuguese West Africa.
Amalia and Leonard	United Kingdom	The ship foundered off Formosa.
Anna Opiuch	Russia	The ship was driven ashore at Youghal, County Cork, United Kingdom before 21 January. Her crew were rescued.
Arendal	United Kingdom	The ship was driven ashore and wrecked near Alexandria, Egypt. She was on a voyage from the River Tyne to Alexandria.
Ariel	United Kingdom	The barque was abandoned 30 nautical miles (56 km) off the Old Head of Kinsale, County Cork. She was on a voyage from Odesa, Russia to Queenstown, County Cork.
Attillia	United Kingdom	The ship was lost off the Irish coast. She was on a voyage from Quebec City, Province of Canada, British North America to Cardiff, Glamorgan.
Busy	United Kingdom	The smack was driven ashore and wrecked on Stanton Sands, Devon between 11 and 18 January.
Ayrshire	United Kingdom	The barque was lost off "Poor Island". She was on a voyage from Quebec City to Dundee, Forfarshire.
Cambria	United Kingdom	The ship was abandoned in the Atlantic Ocean. Her sixteen crew were rescued. She was on a voyage from New York, United States to Glasgow, Renfrewshire.
Canterbury	United Kingdom	The full-rigged ship was abandoned in the Atlantic Ocean before 3 January. Her crew were rescued. She was on a voyage from Constanța, Ottoman Empire to a British port.
Castor	United Kingdom	The ship foundered off Trincomalee, Ceylon before 13 January. Her crew were rescued.
Catarina Maria	Flag unknown	The ship was abandoned in the Bay of Biscay before 14 January.
D. D. de Wolf	(United Kingdom of Great Britain and Ireland) British North America	The ship was wrecked on Campobello Island, New Brunswick. She was on a voyage from Saint Stephen, New Brunswick to Liverpool, Lancashire.
Diana	United Kingdom	The barque was wrecked at Lindisfarne, Northumberland.
Diadem	United Kingdom	The barque was wrecked in the United States with some loss of life.
Dwight	United States	The cargo schooner was lost near Key West, Florida. Crew saved.
Ellen Maria	United Kingdom	The ship was destroyed by fire at Appalachicola, Florida, United States before 12 January.
Ethelbrede	Netherlands	The ship was wrecked on "Struck Point". She was on a voyage from Samarang, Netherlands East Indies to Falmouth, Cornwall, United Kingdom.
Eugenie	United Kingdom	The ship was lost off Ballymacotter, County Cork with the loss of thirteen of her crew. She was on a voyage from Liverpool to Saint John, New Brunswick, British North America.
Fairlie Howard	United Kingdom	The ship foundered in the Indian Ocean before 7 January. Her crew were rescued. She was on a voyage from London to Negapatam, India.
Gleaner	United Kingdom	The brigantine was driven ashore on "Lady Island" before 12 January. Her crew were rescued. She was on a voyage from Belfast, County Antrim to Troon, Ayrshire.
Haden	United Kingdom	The barque was driven ashore at Cardiff.
Hattrick	United Kingdom	The ship was driven ashore on Billiton Island, Netherlands East Indies. She was on a voyage from Hong Kong to Melbourne, Victoria.
Henry Brooks	United Kingdom	The ship schooner was abandoned off the Outer Hebrides before 18 January. Her crew were rescued by Norman (United Kingdom). Henry Brooks was on a voyage from Boston, Lincolnshire to Sydney, Nova Scotia, British North America.
Huron	United Kingdom	The ship was driven ashore at Abersoch, Caernarfonshire. She was refloated with the assistance of a steamship.
Iona	United Kingdom	The full-rigged ship was wrecked on the Haisborough Sands, in the North Sea off the coast of Norfolk with the loss of two of her crew.
Islander	United Kingdom	The ship ran aground at Pará, Brazil. She was on a voyage from South Shields, County Durham to Pará.
Jeanne	Belgium	The barque was wrecked at Maryport, Cumberland, United Kingdom. She was on a voyage from Buenos Aires, Argentina to Queenstown
John	United Kingdom	The schooner was driven ashore at Ballyferris, County Down. She was refloated.
Julia Ann	United Kingdom	The ship was lost on Formosa. She was on a voyage from Hong Kong to Yokohama, Japan.
Julia and Leonora	United Kingdom	The ship foundered off Formosa before 11 January.
Legatus	Norway	The ship foundered off "Utvaare" before 6 January.
Lizzie Fenwick	United Kingdom	The ship was abandoned in the Atlantic Ocean. Her crew were rescued.
L. O. Hackenbridge	United Kingdom	The ship was driven ashore near L'Aiguillon-sur-Mer, Vendée, France. She was on a voyage from L'Aiguillon-su-Mer to Goole, Yorkshire. She was refloated and resumed her voyage, but was towed in to Ramsgate on 13 January in a leaky condition.
Malakoff	United Kingdom	The ship was abandoned in the Atlantic Ocean before 13 December. Her crew survived. She was on a voyage from Trinidad to Deal, Kent.
Margarethe	Russia	The ship was driven ashore on Cape Clear Island, County Cork. She was on a voyage from Savanilla, United States of Colombia to Bremen.
Maria	France	The ship was wrecked at "Giajo" before 20 January. She was on a voyage from the Danube to a Mediterranean port.
Marie Louise	France	The ship was destroyed by fire at Bordeaux, Gironde before 26 January.
Maria Reed	United Kingdom	The ship ran aground at Saint Nazaire, Loire-Inférieure, France and was damaged. She was on a voyage from Saint-Nazaire to Liverpool. She was refloated and put back to Saint Nazaire for repairs.
Mary E. Purdy	United Kingdom	The ship was abandoned in the Atlantic Ocean. Her crew were rescued by Irma (United Kingdom). Mary E. Purdy was on a voyage from Cardiff to Morehead City, North Carolina, United States.
Mattie	United Kingdom	The brig was wrecked on the Molasses Reef. She was on a voyage from Port-au-Prince, Haiti to Queenstown.
M. C. Rowe	United States	The schooner was wrecked on Beaver Island, Nova Scotia. She was on a voyage home to Gloucester, Massachusetts from Newfoundland, British North America.
Menzies	United Kingdom	The ship put in to the Falkland Islands on fire and was scuttled. She was on a voyage from Swansea, Glamorgan to Valparaíso, Chile. She was refloated.
Merion's Bride	United Kingdom	The ship was wrecked at Veracruz, Mexico. Her crew were rescued.
Nencey Packet	United States	The ship foundered off St. Anns Head, Pembrokeshire, United Kingdom on or before 7 January.
Neptunus	Stralsund	The schooner was wrecked on the Spanish coast. Her crew were rescued. She was on a voyage from Sunderland, County Durham, United Kingdom to Gibraltar.
New Odd Fellow	United Kingdom	The galiot was driven ashore and wrecked on "New Island".
Nigre	(Ottoman Empire) Egypt	The steamship was wrecked at "Souvakem".
P. M. Miller	United States	The ship was abandoned in the Atlantic Ocean. Her crew were rescued by Jane Young (United Kingdom). She was on a voyage from Bremen to Boston, Massachusetts.
Royal Standard	(United Kingdom of Great Britain and Ireland) British North America	The ship was abandoned in the Atlantic Ocean before 14 January.
Russell	United Kingdom	The ship was driven ashore at the White Cliffs, in the Dardanelles before 17 January.
Severn	United Kingdom	The ship was abandoned at sea. She was on a voyage from Calcutta, India to London.
Saint Clair	United Kingdom	The ship foundered off the coast of Vendéebefore 22 January.
Simeon Harvey	United Kingdom	The barque was driven ashore and wrecked. She was on a voyage from Sunderland to Havre de Grâce.
St. George	United Kingdom	The barque ran aground off the coast of Brazil. She was on a voyage from Cardiff to Maranhão, Brazil. She was refloated and taken in to Maranhão on 29 January.
Tartar	United Kingdom	The brig was wrecked. Her crew were rescued by the Caister or Great Yarmouth Lifeboat.
T. D. Marshall	United Kingdom	The ship ran aground and capsized in the River Thames at Grays Thurrock, Essex. All on board were rescued.
Venture	United Kingdom	The schooner was driven ashore and wrecked in Dundrum Bay.
William	United Kingdom	The ship sank at Portsmouth, Hampshire.
William Hill	United Kingdom	The ship was driven ashore at Carrickfergus, County Antrim. She was on a voyage from Ayr to Liverpool. She was refloated on 15 January with the assistance of a steamship and was towed in to Belfast in a leaky condition.
Woodlands	United Kingdom	The barque was driven from her moorings, capsized and was severely damaged at Douglas, Isle of Man.
Zambia	United States	The ship departed from Queenstown for the River Tyne. No further trace, presumed foundered with the loss of all hands.
Unnamed	United Kingdom	The pilot yawl collided with Anne Williams (United Kingdom) and sank off Lundy Island, Devon. Both people on board were rescued by Anne Williams.
