= Cairnleith Crofts =

Coordinates: 57.40°N 02.16°W

- Location within Aberdeenshire
- OS grid reference: NJ9035
- Council area: Aberdeenshire
- Lieutenancy area: Aberdeenshire
- Country: Scotland
- Sovereign state: United Kingdom
- Police: Scotland
- Fire: Scottish
- Ambulance: Scottish

Cairnleith Crofts is a group of dwellings in Ythanbank, Aberdeenshire, Scotland.
