= Calcutt, Wiltshire =

Hamlet in England

Coordinates: 51.639°N 1.839°W

Calcutt
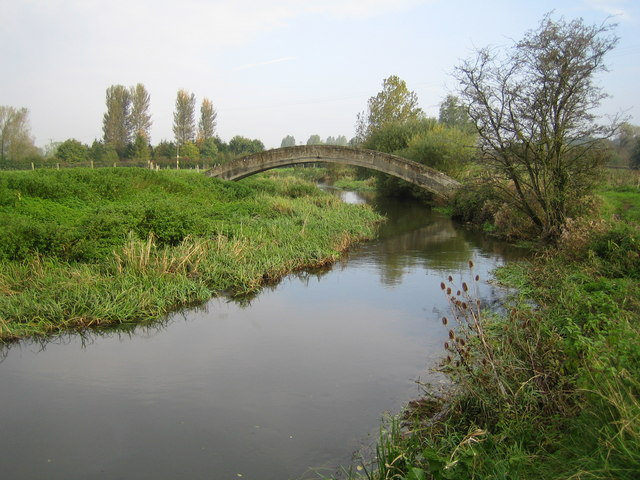
- River Thames near Calcutt

- Location within Wiltshire
- OS grid reference: SU112934
- Civil parish: Cricklade
- Unitary authority: Wiltshire
- Ceremonial county: Wiltshire
- Region: South West
- Country: England
- Sovereign state: United Kingdom
- Post town: Swindon
- Postcode district: SN6
- Dialling code: 01793
- Police: Wiltshire
- Fire: Dorset and Wiltshire
- Ambulance: South Western
- UK Parliament: South Cotswolds

Calcutt is a hamlet about 3/4 mile (1.2 km) east of Cricklade in Wiltshire, England. It lies near the River Thames and is divided by the A419 Swindon-Cricklade-Cirencester road.

The River Key passes close to the west of the hamlet and joins the Thames a short distance to the north.

The Domesday Book of 1086 records a small settlement of nine households at Colecote, held by Odo of Winchester. The Andrews and Dury map of 1773 and again in 1810 has the name of the hamlet as Corkett, while the Ordnance Survey map in the 1890s has Calcott (not to be confused with Calcott, Kent or Calcott, Shropshire).

Calcutt has two Grade II* listed buildings: Calcutt Court Farmhouse, south of the A419, from the 18th century; and Calcutt Farmhouse, north of the road, from the late 18th or early 19th.
