= Cannalidgey =

Hamlet in Cornwall, England

Coordinates: 50.490°N 4.914°W

Cannalidgey: Cornish: Kanelysi
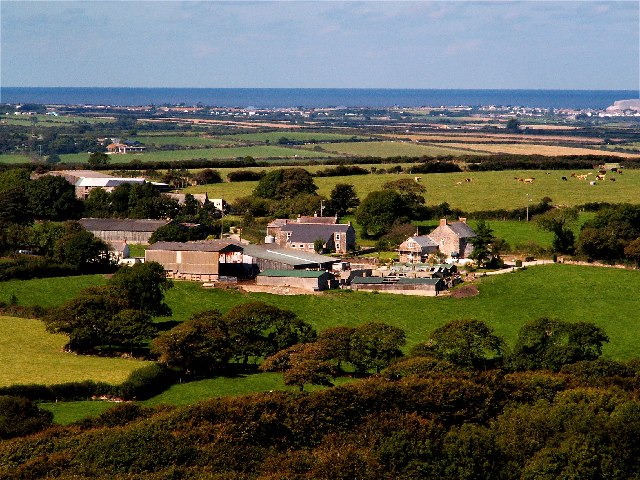
- Cannalidgey

- Location within Cornwall
- OS grid reference: SW934696
- Civil parish: St Issey
- Unitary authority: Cornwall
- Ceremonial county: Cornwall
- Region: South West
- Country: England
- Sovereign state: United Kingdom
- Post town: WADEBRIDGE
- Postcode district: PL27
- Dialling code: 01841
- Police: Devon and Cornwall
- Fire: Cornwall
- Ambulance: South Western
- UK Parliament: North Cornwall

Cannalidgey (Cornish: Kanelysi, meaning Ysi's channel) is a hamlet 3.7 miles (6.0 km) south of Padstow in Cornwall, England. Cannalidgey is in the civil parish of St Issey. It is in the civil parish of St Minver Highlands.
