= Ythanbank =

Coordinates: 57°24′03″N 2°09′35″W

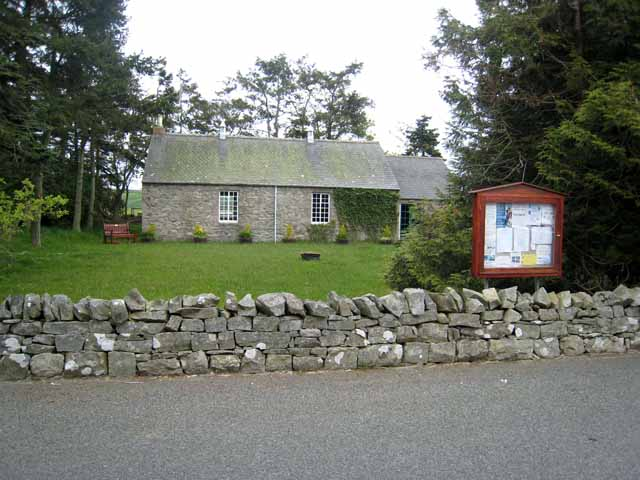
- Ythanbank village hall

- Location within Aberdeenshire
- OS grid reference: NJ905345
- Council area: Aberdeenshire
- Lieutenancy area: Aberdeenshire
- Country: Scotland
- Sovereign state: United Kingdom
- Post town: Ellon
- Postcode district: AB41
- Dialling code: 01358
- Police: Scotland
- Fire: Scottish
- Ambulance: Scottish
- UK Parliament: Gordon and Buchan
- Scottish Parliament: Aberdeenshire East

Ythanbank is a village in Aberdeenshire, Scotland. It is situated on the east bank of the River Ythan on the B9005, 4 miles (6.4 km) north-west of the town of Ellon.
