= Camusteel =

Coordinates: 57.41462°N 5.79834°W

Camusteel: Scottish Gaelic: Camas Teile
- Location within the Ross and Cromarty area
- OS grid reference: NG719424
- Council area: Highland
- Country: Scotland
- Sovereign state: United Kingdom
- Postcode district: IV54 8
- Police: Scotland
- Fire: Scottish
- Ambulance: Scottish

Camusteel (Scottish Gaelic: Camas Teile) is a remote crofting and former fishing village in the Applecross peninsula, located less than 1 mile directly south of Applecross village, on the west coast of Strathcarron, Ross-shire, Scottish Highlands and is in the Scottish council area of Highland.
