= Caldhame =

Village in Angus, Scotland

Coordinates: 56.625337°N 2.865393°W

- Location within Angus
- OS grid reference: NO470485
- Council area: Angus
- Lieutenancy area: Angus
- Country: Scotland
- Sovereign state: United Kingdom
- Police: Scotland
- Fire: Scottish
- Ambulance: Scottish

Caldhame (Scots pronunciation: [ˈkɑːdəm]) is a village in Angus, Scotland. It lies approximately 1 mile to the south of Forfar.

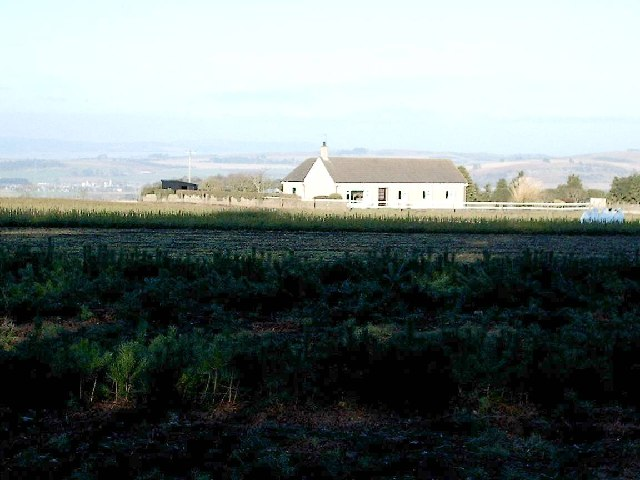
Cottage at Caldhame
