= Cairnorrie =

Coordinates: 57.459°N 2.231°W

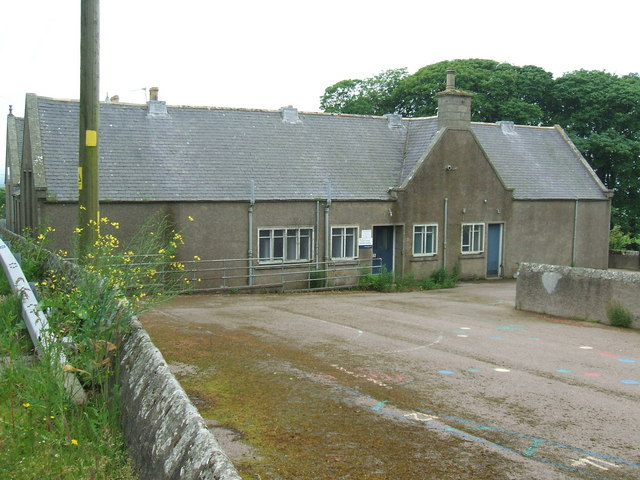
- Cairnorrie Primary School (now closed)

- Location within Aberdeenshire
- OS grid reference: NJ862409
- Council area: Aberdeenshire
- Lieutenancy area: Aberdeenshire
- Country: Scotland
- Sovereign state: United Kingdom
- Post town: ELLON
- Postcode district: AB41
- Dialling code: 01651
- Police: Scotland
- Fire: Scottish
- Ambulance: Scottish
- UK Parliament: Gordon and Buchan
- Scottish Parliament: Aberdeenshire East

Cairnorrie is a rural settlement in the Formartine area of Aberdeenshire, Scotland, situated on the B9170 road between Methlick and New Deer. The primary school at Cairnorrie was closed in 2005.
