= Helen Calcutt =

British poet and writer

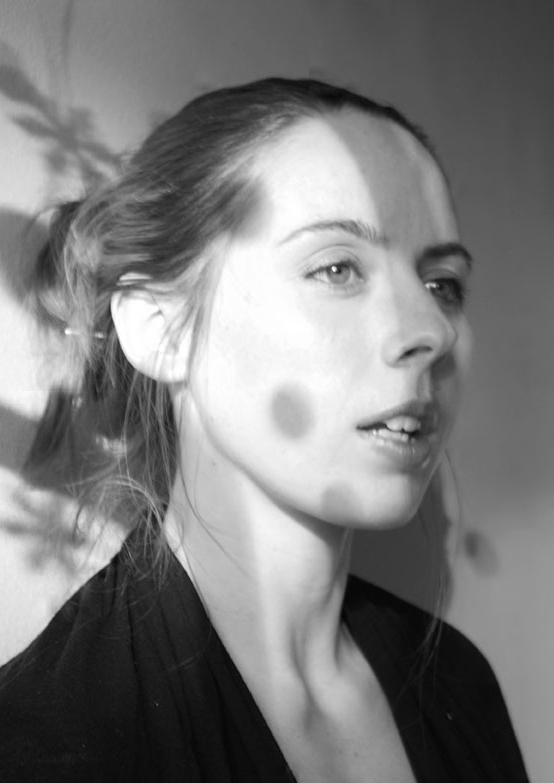
- Helen Calcutt, in 2015
- Born: 27 March 1988 (age 38); Midlands, England
- Occupations: poet, dancer, choreographer

Helen Calcutt (born 27 March 1988), is a British poet, dancer, and choreographer.

== Writing career ==
Calcutt is the author of three collections. Her debut, Sudden rainfall was published by British publishing house Perdika Press. It was a PBS Choice on publication and became Waterstone's best-selling pamphlet in 2016. Her second pamphlet Somehow was published by Verve Poetry Press in September 2020. It was a PBS Winter Bulletin Pamphlet, and Poetry School Book of the Year (2020, shortlist). Her full-length collection Feeling all the kills, described as ‘radical, revolutionary, (and) fearless in depicting women as sexual and maternal' (Zoë Brigley) was published by Pavilion Poetry in April 2024.

Calcutt was one of the six poets selected to perform at the 2022 Commonwealth Games opening ceremony, hosted in Birmingham. Her poem "Mother, the city", written for the ceremony, was performed as part of its opening scene 'Everything to Everybody.

Calcutt also writes for the Guardian, the HuffPost and the Wales Arts Review. In 2023, she was awarded an honorary degree from Loughborough University for her outstanding contribution to the arts.

== Activism ==
Calcutt is an activist for mental health awareness, and male suicide prevention. She is the creator and editor of acclaimed poetry anthology, 'Eighty Four' The title stands for the number of men who take their lives every week in the U.K. The book was published by Verve Poetry Press (2019) was shortlisted for the Saboteur Best Anthology Award, 2019, and was a Poetry Wales Book of The Year 2019.

Calcutt lost her own brother to suicide in September 2017.

== Dance ==
Calcutt is also a dancer & choreographer working in dance-theatre, with a specialism in text-to-dance translation. She is Artistic Director of Beyond Words dance-theatre company. Her choreographic work has secured major touring grants from Arts Council England and been commissioned by companies such as Total Insight Theatre, Midlands Actors Theatre, the Southbank Centre, and the Birmingham Royal Ballet.

== Bibliography ==
- 2013: Sudden rainfall, Perdika Press, ISBN 978-1-905649-17-4
- 2018: Unable Mother, V.Press, ISBN 978-1-9998444-0-0
- 2019: Anthology Eighty Four Verve Poetry Press ISBN 978-1-91256513-9
- 2020: Somehow Verve Poetry Press, ISBN 978-1-912565-42-9
- 2024: Feeling all the kills Pavilion Poetry, ISBN 978-1-802074-72-7
