= Camore =

Hamlet in the Scottish Highlands

Coordinates: 57.88592°N 4.06372°W

Camore: Scottish Gaelic: An Cadha Mòr
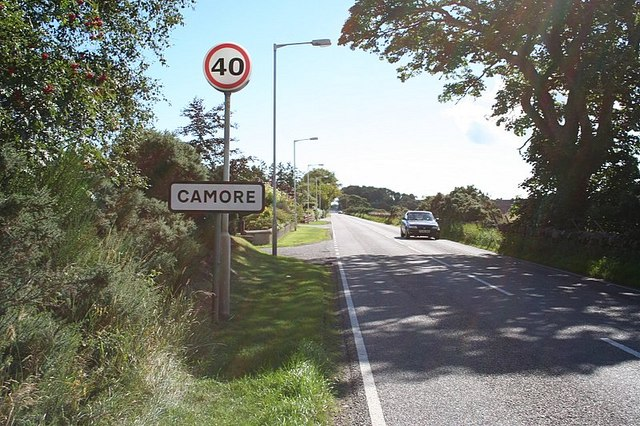

- Location within the Sutherland area
- OS grid reference: NH777903
- Council area: Highland
- Lieutenancy area: Sutherland
- Country: Scotland
- Sovereign state: United Kingdom
- Postcode district: IV25 3
- Police: Scotland
- Fire: Scottish
- Ambulance: Scottish

Camore (Scottish Gaelic: An Cadha Mòr) is a small hamlet, located 0.5 mile directly southeast of Evelix, and 1.5 miles west of Dornoch, in south east Sutherland, Scottish Highlands and is in the Scottish council area of Highland. The name comes from the Gaelic cadha mòr meaning "big path" or "big passage". The hamlet is purely residential.
