= Camps End =

Hamlet in Cambridgeshire, England

Coordinates: 52.0540572°N 0.3522223°E

Gowhole
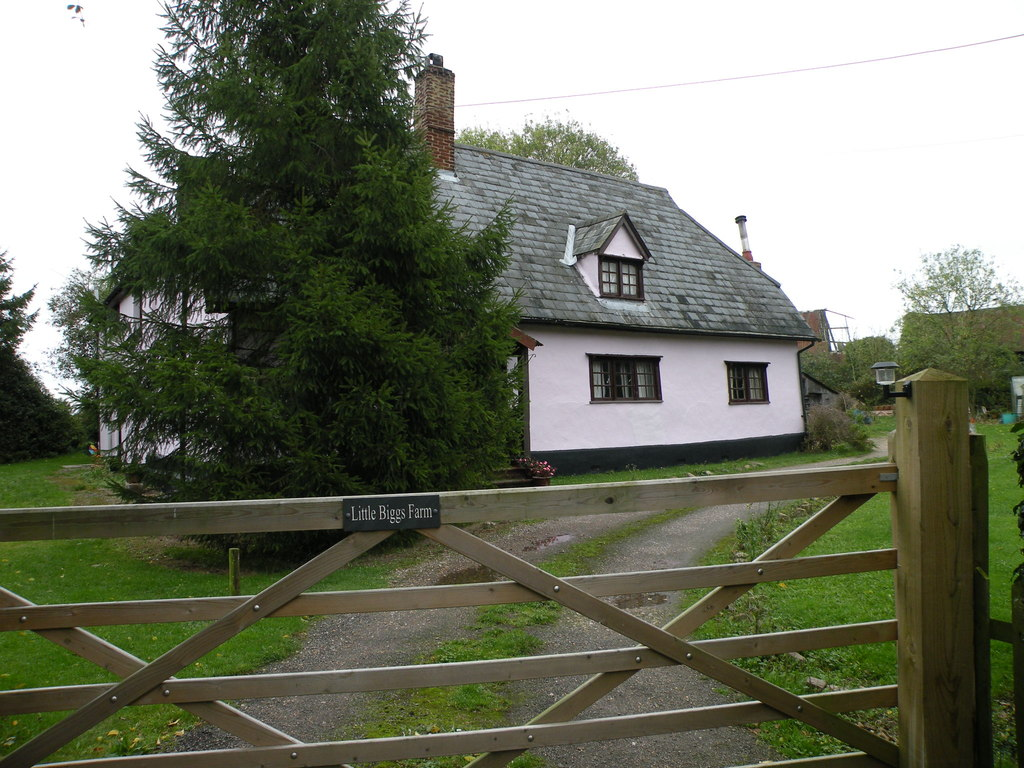
- Little Biggs Farmhouse

- Location within Cambridgeshire
- Civil parish: Castle Camps
- District: South Cambridgeshire
- Shire county: Cambridgeshire
- Region: East
- Country: England
- Sovereign state: United Kingdom
- Police: Cambridgeshire
- Fire: Cambridgeshire
- Ambulance: East of England

Camps End is a hamlet in the civil parish of Castle Camps, in the South Cambridgeshire district, in the county of Cambridgeshire, England.
