= Calvadnack =

Heathland in Cornwall, England

- Kalvadnek (Cornish)
- Location within Cornwall
- 50°10′29″N 5°14′14″W
- Type: Iron Age Settlement

UNESCO World Heritage Site
- Designated: 2006
- Part of: Cornwall and West Devon Mining Landscape

Calvadnack (Cornish: Kalvadnek) is a 130 acres (53 hectares) area of heathland 3.7 miles (6.0 km) south-east of Camborne in Cornwall, England, UK. Calvadnack is in the civil parish of Wendron. Calvadnack is south-west of the hill of Carnmenellis. In the centre of the moor are the remains of an Iron Age settlement consisting of four round houses.

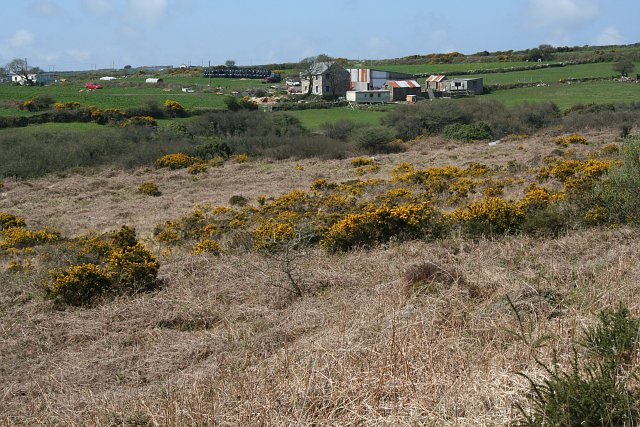
Calvadnack and Farmland

Almost all of Calvadnack Moor is in the Cornwall and West Devon Mining Landscape which has been designated as a World Heritage Site. The site was added to the World Heritage List during the 30th Session of the UNESCO World Heritage Committee in Vilnius, July 2006.
