= Capton =

Village in Devon, England

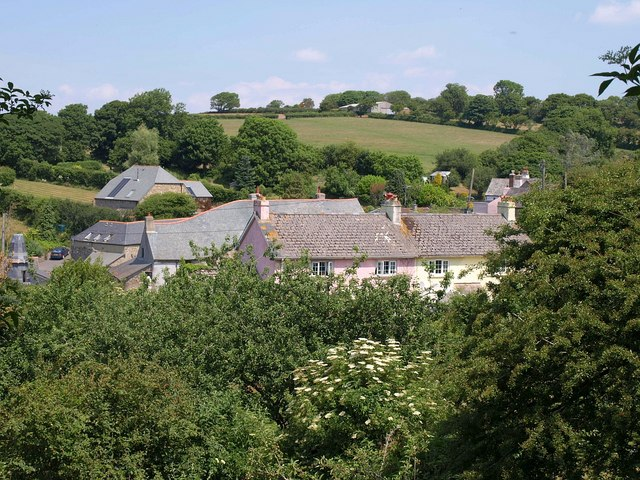
Capton

Location of Capton within Devon

Capton is a village near Dartmouth in Devon, England.

On a hilltop to the east of the village is an Iron Age enclosure or hill fort approximately 185 m (607 ft) above sea level.50.3675°N 3.6287°W
