= Cabbacott =

Village in Devon, England

Coordinates: 50.96°N 04.28°W

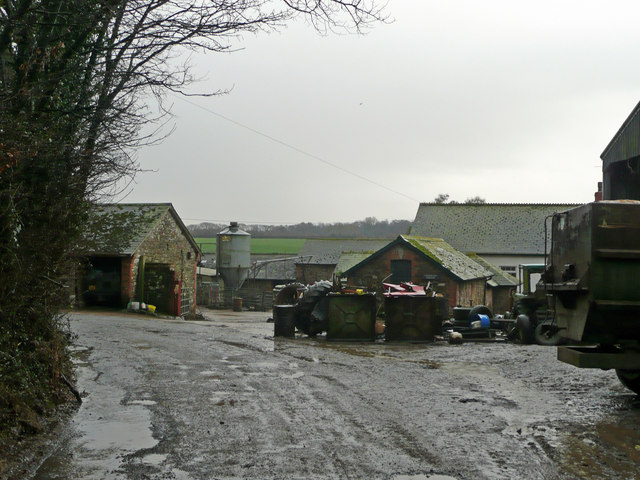
- Cabbacott Farm

- Location within Devon
- OS grid reference: SS4021
- Shire county: Devon
- Region: South West
- Country: England
- Sovereign state: United Kingdom
- Police: Devon and Cornwall
- Fire: Devon and Somerset
- Ambulance: South Western

Cabbacott is a hamlet in Devon, England.
