= Calford Green =

Hamlet in Suffolk, England

Coordinates: 52.08°N 0.478°E

- Location within Suffolk
- District: West Suffolk
- Shire county: Suffolk
- Region: East
- Country: England
- Sovereign state: United Kingdom
- Post town: Haverhill
- Postcode district: CB9
- Dialling code: 01440
- UK Parliament: West Suffolk

Calford Green is a small hamlet situated 0.5 miles south of Kedington and two miles east of Haverhill in south-west Suffolk, United Kingdom.
