= Cairston =

Coordinates: 58.976°N 3.272°W

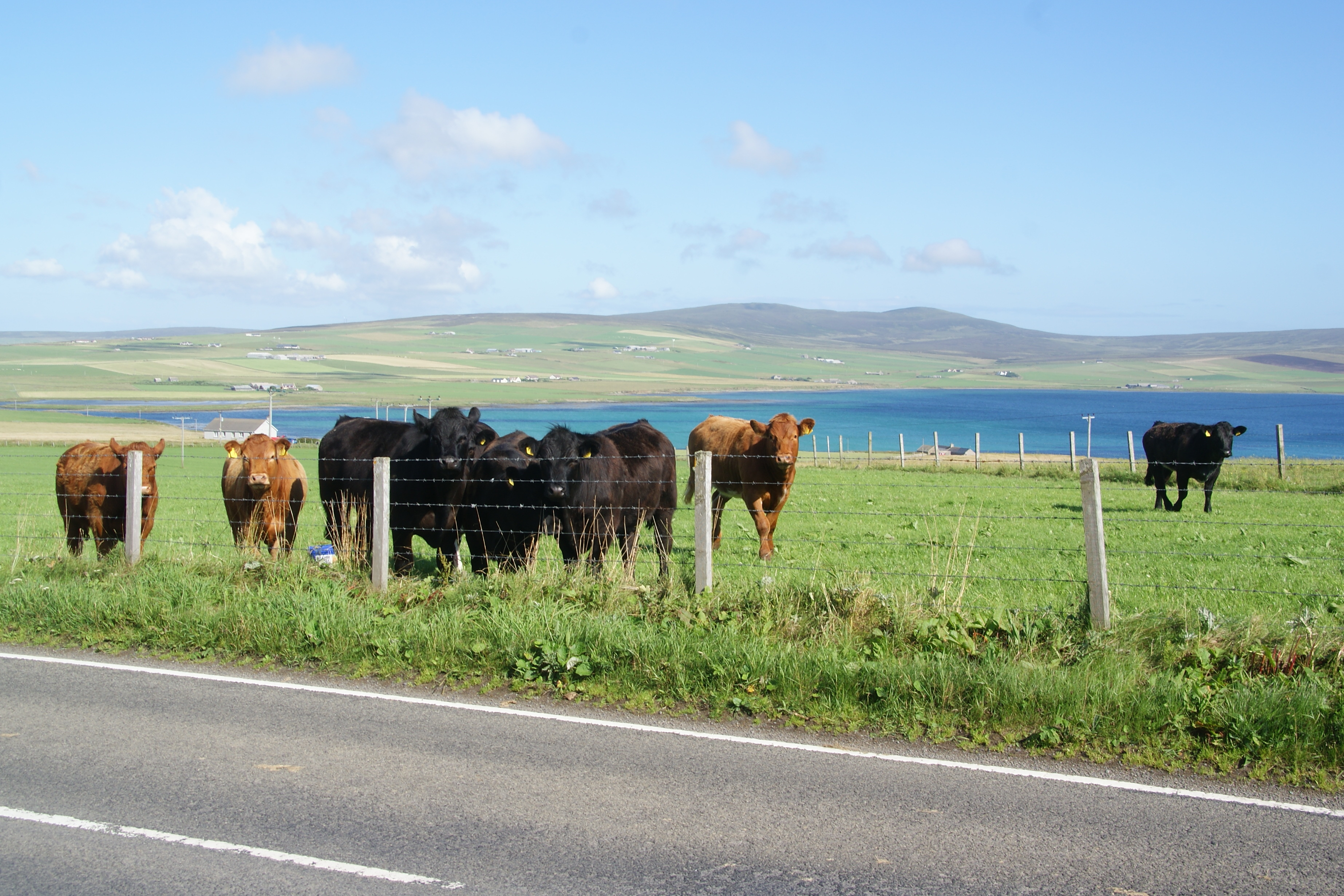
- Cattle at Cairston, with the Bay of Ireland, and the hills south-east of Stenness, beyond

- Location within Orkney
- OS grid reference: HY268105
- Civil parish: Stromness
- Council area: Orkney
- Lieutenancy area: Orkney
- Country: Scotland
- Sovereign state: United Kingdom
- Post town: STROMNESS
- Postcode district: KW16
- Dialling code: 01856
- Police: Scotland
- Fire: Scottish
- Ambulance: Scottish
- UK Parliament: Orkney and Shetland
- Scottish Parliament: Orkney

Cairston is a village on Mainland, in Orkney, Scotland. The settlement is within the parish of Stromness.

Within the village is located the Castle of Cairston which is said to have belonged to the House of Gordons, and may have been built in 1152, as contested in a Saga.

The property's north-west corner underwent renovation in the 16th century in order to form a mansion house. In present day, the site is ruinous, overgrown and used for aggriculture.
