= Calcott, Shropshire =

Hamlet in Shropshire, England

Coordinates: 52.720°N 2.815°W

Calcott
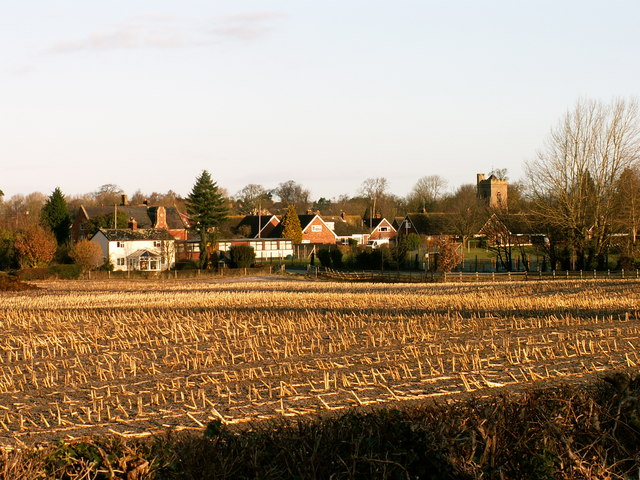
- Farmland at Calcott

- Location within Shropshire
- OS grid reference: SJ449139
- Civil parish: Bicton
- Unitary authority: Shropshire
- Ceremonial county: Shropshire
- Region: West Midlands
- Country: England
- Sovereign state: United Kingdom
- Post town: SHREWSBURY
- Postcode district: SY3
- Dialling code: 01743
- Police: West Mercia
- Fire: Shropshire
- Ambulance: West Midlands
- UK Parliament: Shrewsbury and Atcham

Calcott is a hamlet in Shropshire, England. It falls within the civil parish of Bicton. The name derives from the Old English calde cote, meaning cold huts, or cold cots.
