= Calcott, Kent =

Hamlet in Kent, England

Coordinates: 51.3212°N 1.1187°E

Calcott
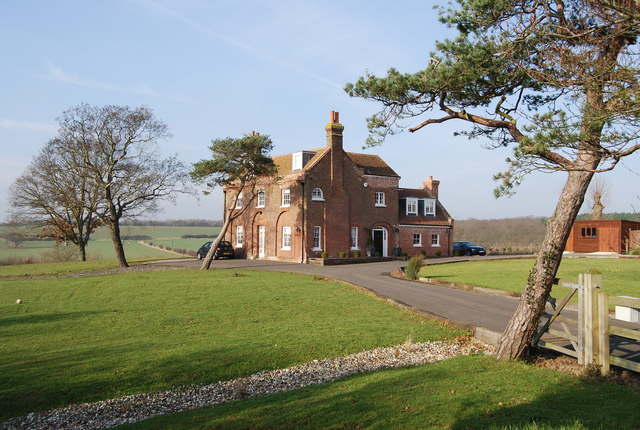
- Calcott Manor

- Location within Kent
- Civil parish: Sturry
- District: Canterbury
- Shire county: Kent
- Region: South East
- Country: England
- Sovereign state: United Kingdom
- Post town: Canterbury
- Postcode district: CT3
- Police: Kent
- Fire: Kent
- Ambulance: South East Coast
- UK Parliament: Canterbury

Calcott is a hamlet in the civil parish of Sturry, in the Canterbury district of the county of Kent, England. It lies on the A291 road, about 1 1/2 miles (2.4 km) north of Sturry and 3 miles (5 km) south of Herne Bay.
