= Applecross Bay =

Bay on the west coast of Scotland

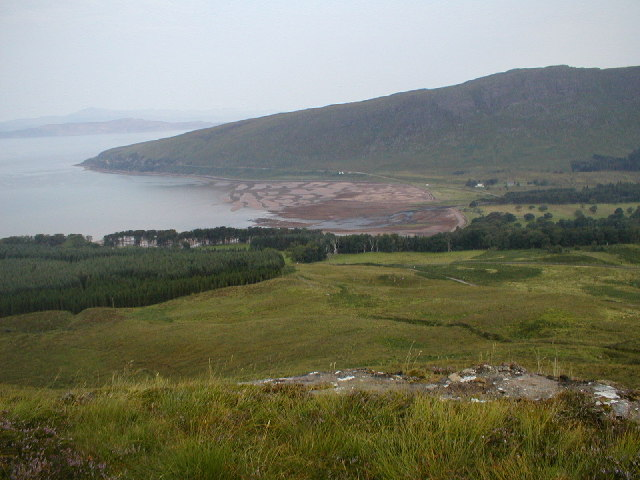
- Applecross Bay looking from the south

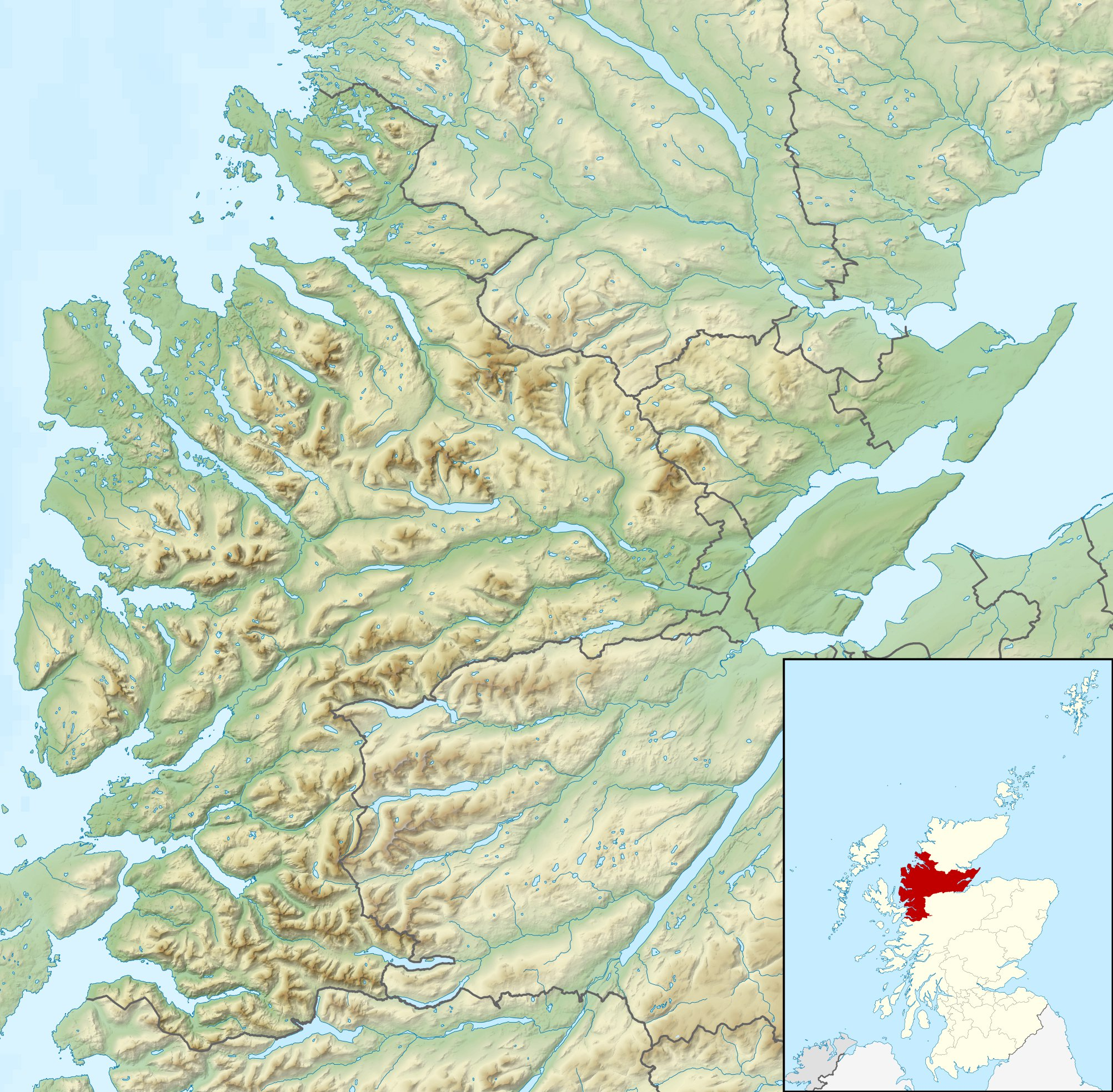
- Location within Ross and Cromarty
- Location: Applecross peninsula, Ross and Cromarty Scotland
- Coordinates: 57°26′7.800″N 5°49′22.971″W
- River sources: River Applecross
- Ocean/sea sources: Inner Sound
- Basin countries: Scotland
- Max. length: 3.95 km (2.45 mi)
- Max. width: 2.28 km (1.42 mi)
- Settlements: Applecross, Toscaig, Culduie, Camusterrach, Sand

Applecross Bay is large remote tidal coastal embayment, located next to the small fishing village of Applecross and is on the west coast of the Applecross peninsula in the Wester Ross part of Ross and Cromarty, in the Scottish Highlands in the west coast of Scotland. It lies between Loch Torridon and Loch Kishorn. The bay and village was inaccessible by road until the late 18th century and can now be reached by the long coastal road Shieldaig that was completed in 1982, or from the Scottish Gaelic: Bealach na Bà or Pass of the Cattle which at 625 metres (2,051 ft), is one of the highest roads in Scotland. The village of Applecross was established by St. Moalrubha, in the 7th century. A sculptured stone is the only relic of St. Moalrubha remaining, who built a chapel there.

== Settlements ==
This row of houses which is often referred to as Applecross, and is marked as Applecross on some maps and sits at the head of the bay, is actually called 'Shore Street' and is referred to locally just as 'The Street'. The name Applecross applies to all the settlements around the peninsula, including Toscaig, Culduie, Camusterrach, Sand, and many others. Applecross is also the name of the local estate and the civil parish, which includes Shieldaig and Torridon, and has a population of 544.

== Geography ==
Applecross bay is overlooked by the flat plain of the Applecross peninsula, which is bounded on three sides, by three hills. To the north of Applecross bay is Beinn a'Chlachain at 624 metres (2,047 ft), to the west of the bay is An Staonach at 516 metres (1,693 ft). To the southeast and south of An Staonach is Sgurr a'Chaorachain at 792 metres (2,598 ft), which is far the largest in the area. Ten miles to the west of Applecross bay, is the highest peak of Sgurr a'Gharaidh at 732 metres (2,402 ft).

== Gallery ==
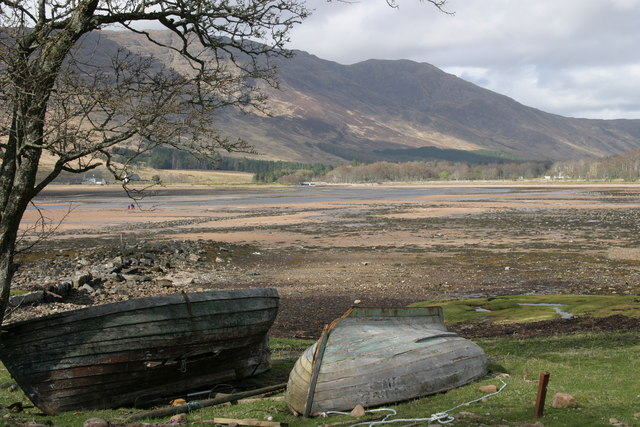
Applecross Bay

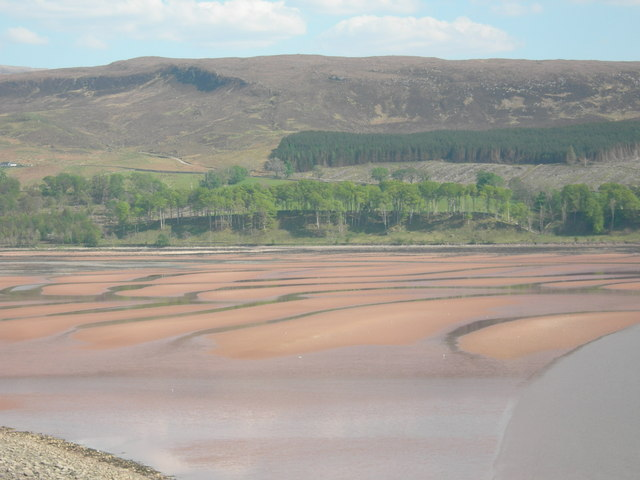
Applecross Bay At low tide

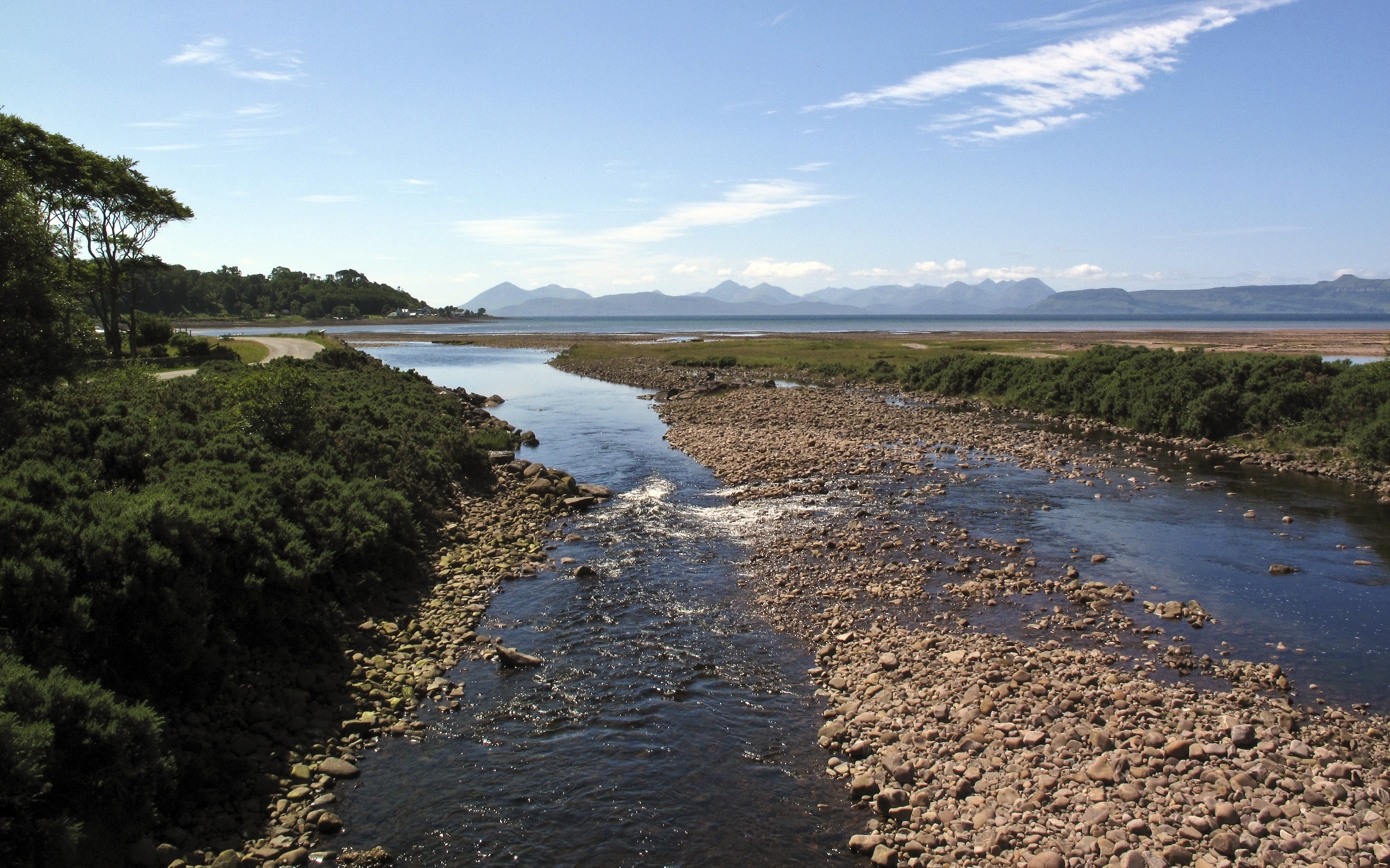
River Applecross entering Applecross Bay.

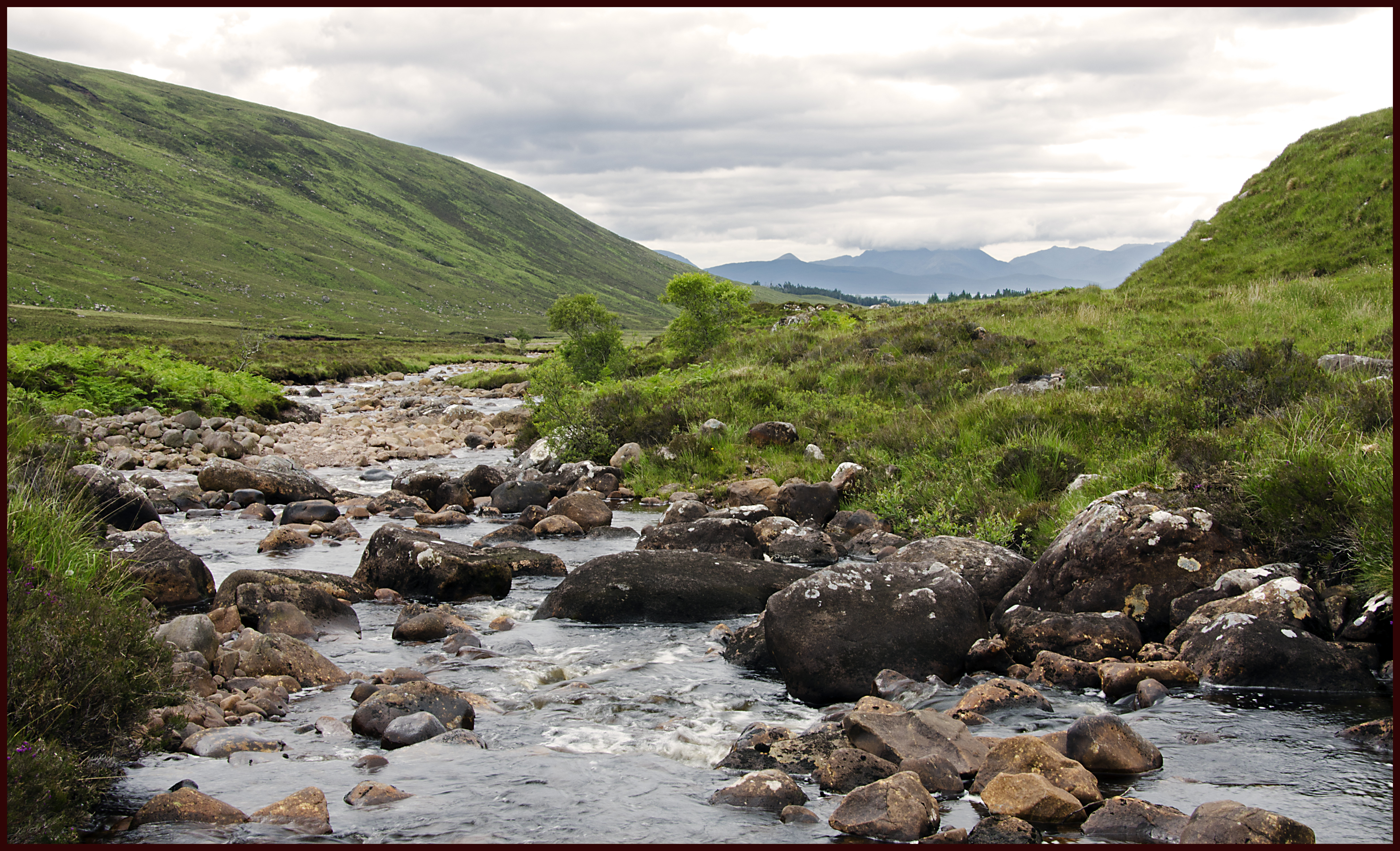
River Applecross towards Applecross Bay.

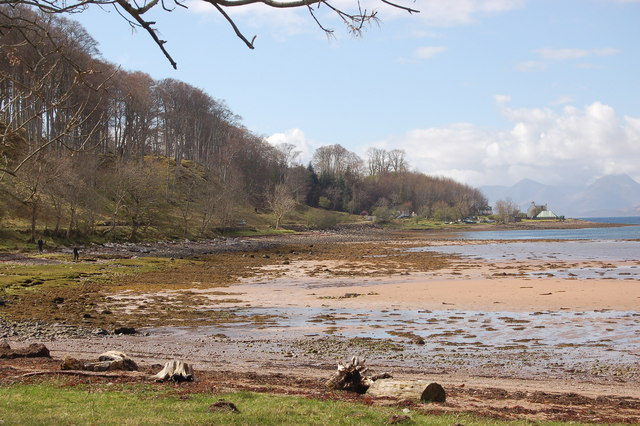
Applecross Bay.

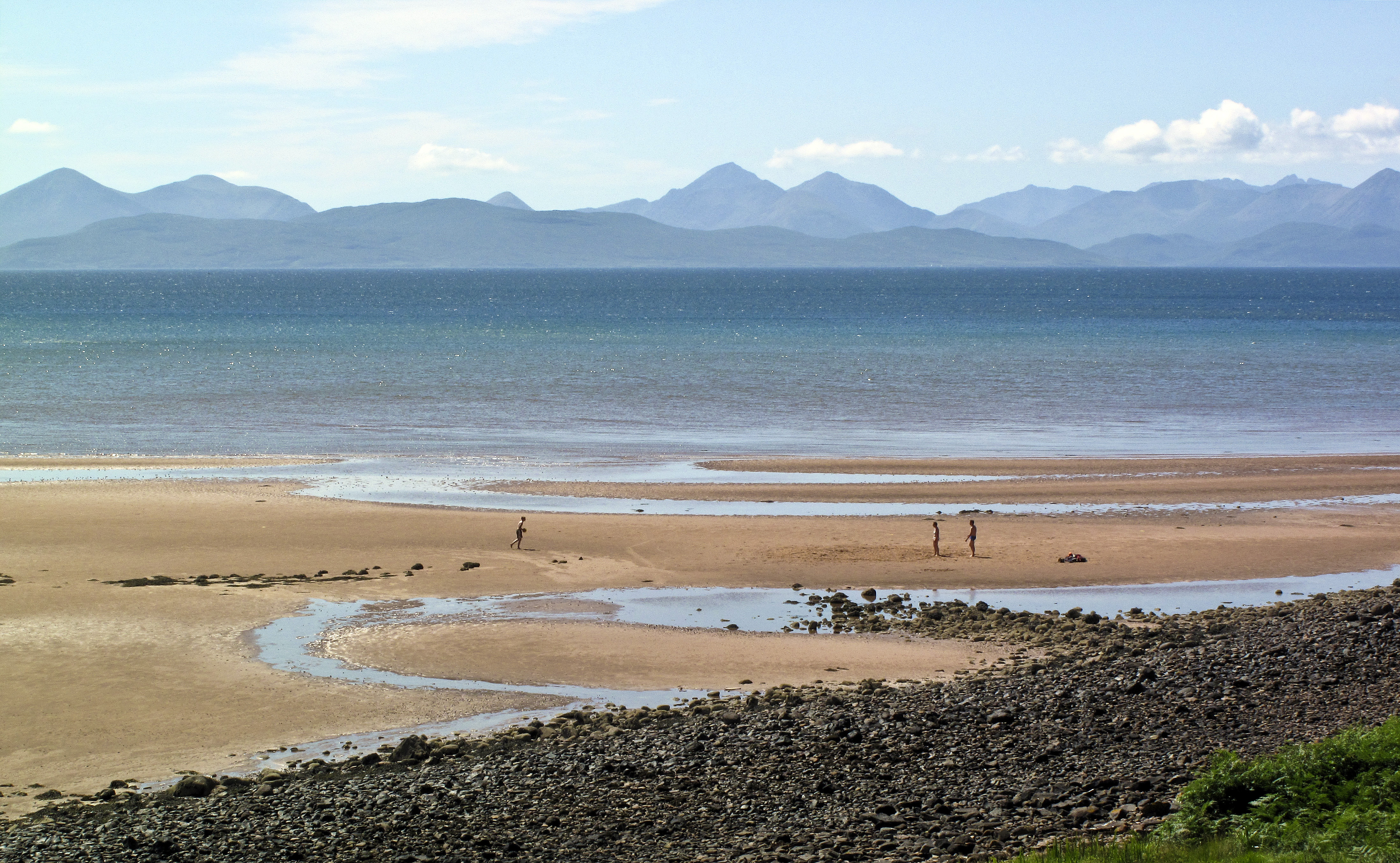
Applecross bay & beach nr. Applecross village.

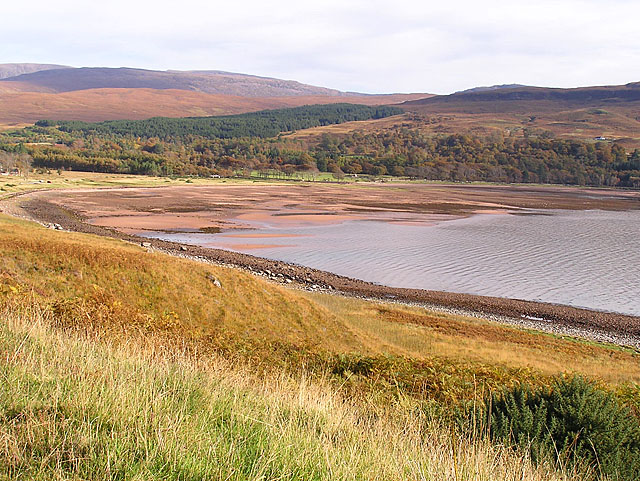
Applecross Bay Looking across the large Bay that lies just to the north of Applecross.

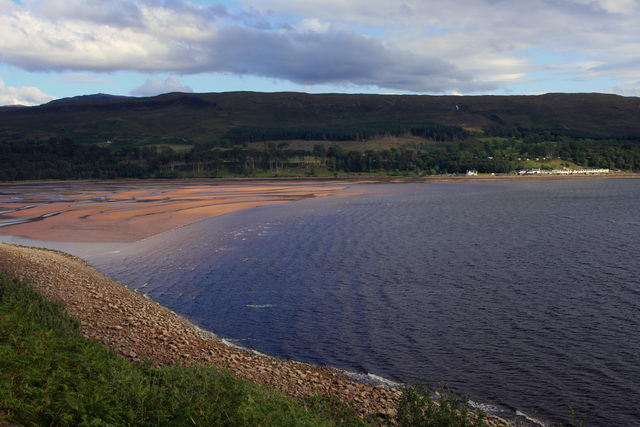
Applecross Bay. The bay, with Applecross village in the background.

== See also ==
- List of lochs in Scotland
- List of reservoirs and dams in the United Kingdom
