= Caithness Broch Project =

Scottish charity

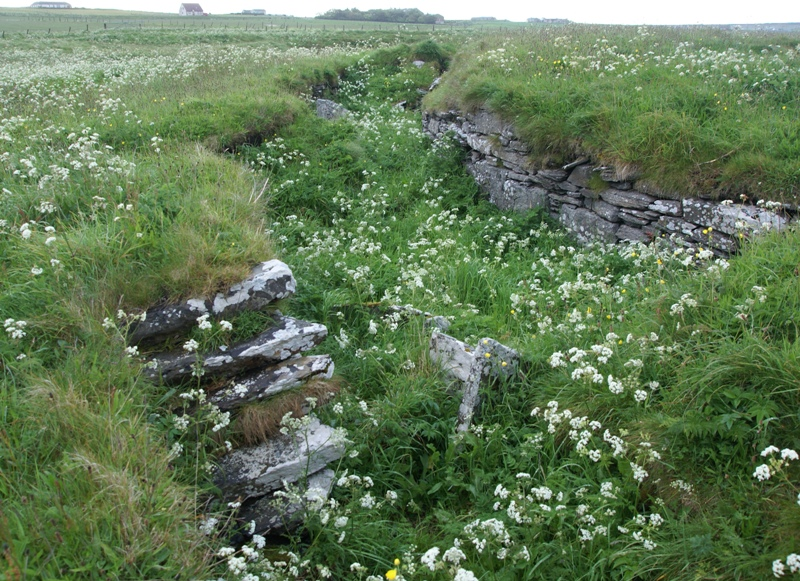
- Formation: October 2013 (company); 29 January 2016 (charity)
- Founded at: Caithness
- Headquarters: Thurso
- Website: http://www.thebrochproject.co.uk/

The Caithness Broch Project is a Scottish charity which aims to promote the county of Caithness as a heritage tourism destination. Established as a company in October 2013 and granted charitable status in January 2016, the organisation highlights the region’s archaeological landscape, particularly the numerous brochs (Iron Age drystone towers), which have earned Caithness the reputation of being "the home of the broch". There are a greater number of brochs in Caithness than in any other region of Scotland, with over half of all known sites found in the area.

The ultimate goal of the organisation is to build a replica broch, which will serve as a tourist attraction and act as an important project in experimental archaeology. Alyn Smith, Scottish National Party MEP, has credited the project with being a "model example of community-led activism".

== Project aims and objectives ==
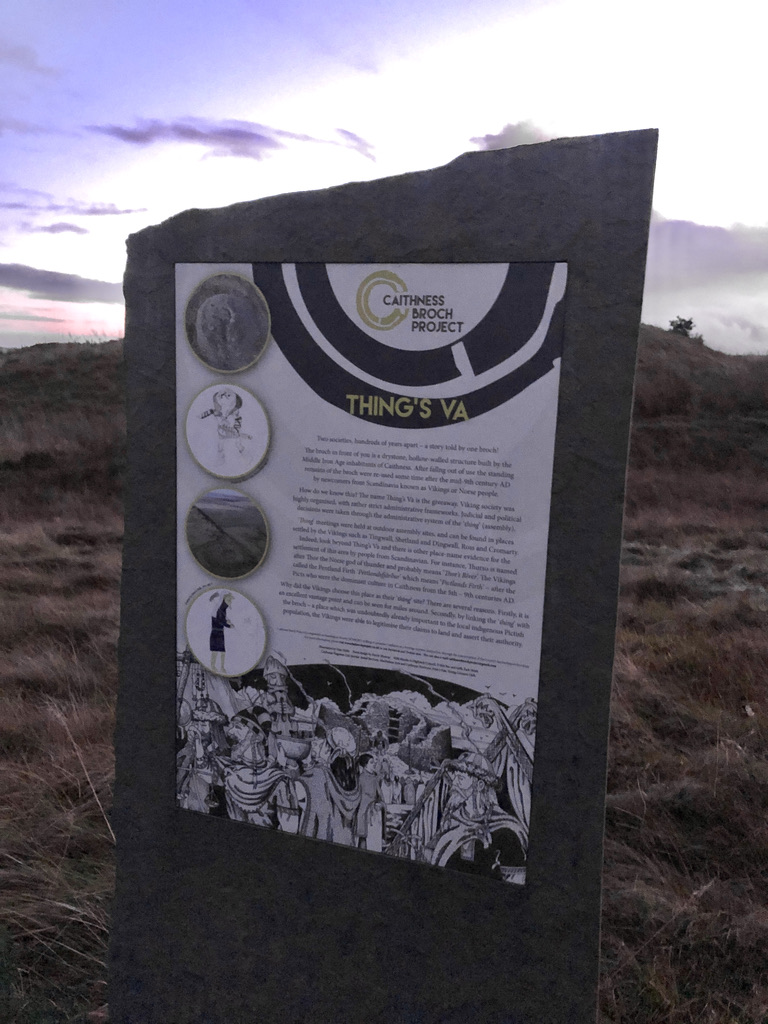
Interpretation panel by Caithness Broch Project at Thing's Va broch near Thurso, Caithness

The aims of the Caithness Broch Project include, amongst others:

- the promotion and preservation of existing archaeological sites in Caithness, by improving signage, access, and information releases;
- the creation of an archaeological trail around Caithness, intended for use by both local residents and visitors, to encourage awareness of the area’s heritage;
- the construction of a replica Iron Age broch and accompanying visitor centre, using authentic building techniques, which will eventually serve as a tourist attraction and drystone dyking workshop.

To date, the organisation has led a number of community outreach events, including conservation work at Ousdale Broch, a broch exhibition featuring a 10,000-piece Lego broch built by Brick to the Past, and engagement activities in schools and with existing archaeological groups in the county. To coincide with VisitScotland’s Year of History, Heritage and Archaeology in 2017, the project coordinated the Caithness Broch Festival, a year-long archaeology festival that included field walking, archaeological survey, and other hands-on archaeological activities, with Scottish newspaper The National acting as media partner. The festival was part of a three-year project undertaken to raise awareness of and learn more about brochs.

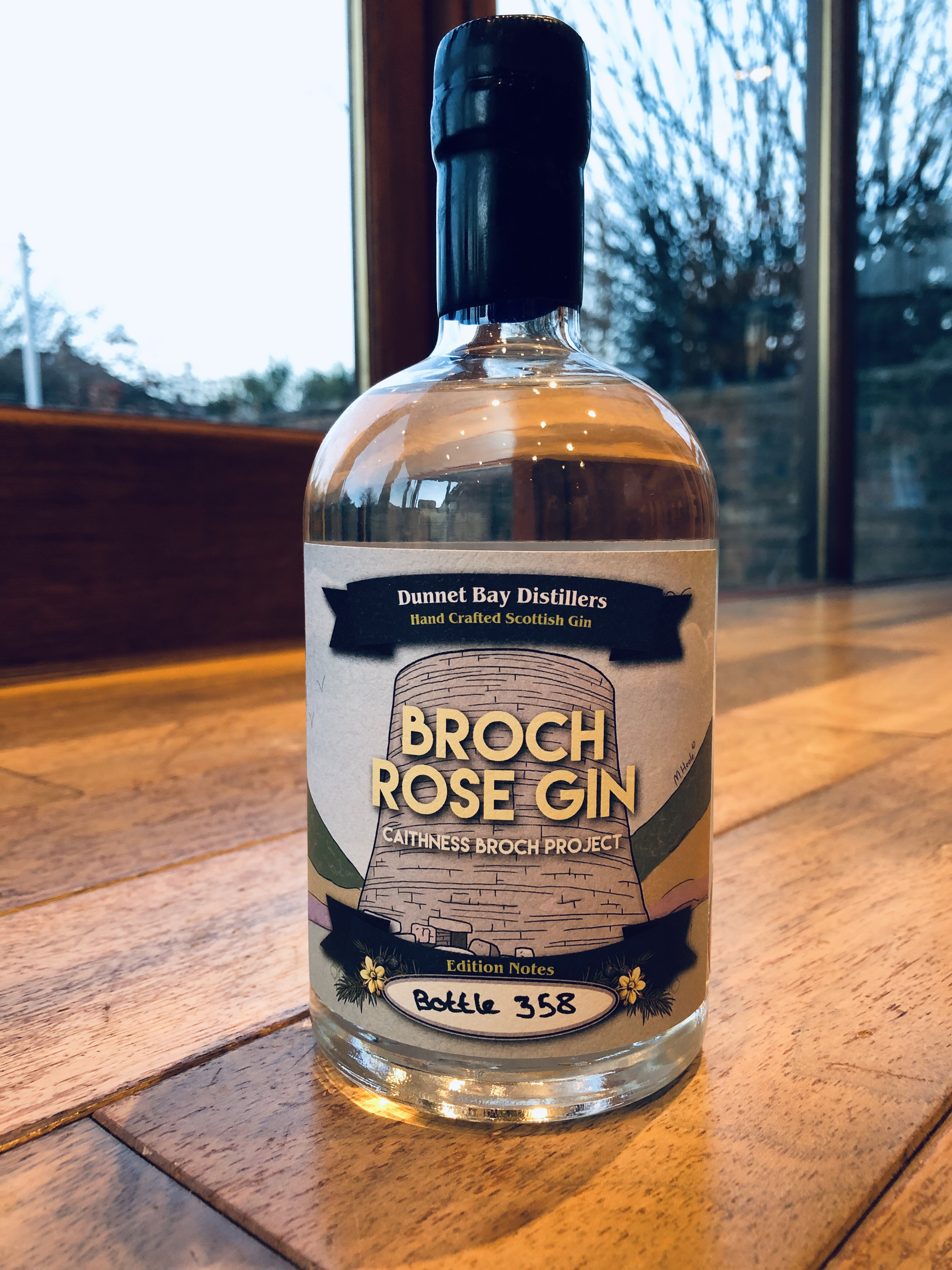
Broch Rose Gin by Dunnet Bay Distillers for Caithness Broch Project, inspired by prehistoric Scotland

More recently, work has been carried out at brochs at Achvarasdal, Thing’s Va, Keiss, and Ousdale, where new interpretive signage has been installed and access to sites has been significantly improved. Accompanying leaflets with more detailed information were produced. The project also worked with ‘Flows to the Future’ to create an information panel at Loch Rangag. Additionally, online maps of the region’s brochs and other archaeological attractions have been created and are freely available.

Caithness Broch Project has also attracted interest from the media and maintains a strong social media presence. In 2016, it was featured on BBC Scotland’s Landward, which showcased some of the archaeological sites of interest to the project and the construction of the replica broch. Promotional activity for the project has included the production Broch Rose Gin, a limited-edition gin inspired by prehistoric Scotland, by Dunnet Bay Distillers, and miniature chocolate brochs by Caithness Chocolate.

== Ousdale Broch ==
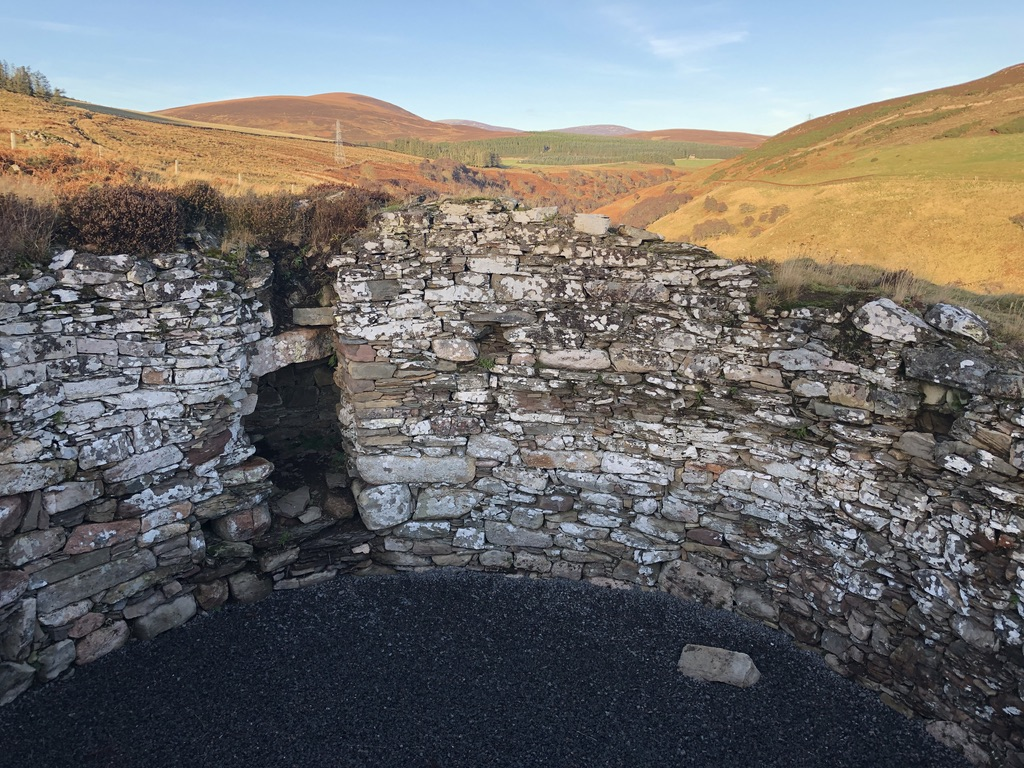
Interior of Ousdale Broch near Helmsdale, showing some of the conservation work and gravel fill

Between 2015 and 2020, the project oversaw improvement work at Ousdale Broch, located a mile north of the Caithness-Sutherland border and a few miles south of Berriedale. The site, also known as Ousdale Burn or Allt a’ Bhurg (‘stream of the fort’) Broch, also encompasses the ruins of Borg, a post-Medieval clearance village, and the surrounding landscape has a rich prehistoric, Norse, and later historic archaeological record. The area is designated a Site of Special Scientific Interest (SSSI).

In 2015, site surveys established that the broch was in a serious state of disrepair, and that intervention would be required to conserve the surviving structure. After discussions with Historic Environment Scotland determined that the broch could be consolidated, a structural inspection and a detailed repairs plan were carried out before funding applications to cover conservation works, interpretation panels, and the creation of a car park and walkable path were submitted. Environmental and archaeological works commenced in 2019, with an initial recording by Clyde Archaeology followed by vegetation clearance and consolidation of the structure. Certain features, including the interior staircase and one of the two corbelled guard cells, were conserved, and an aumbry (stone recess) was reconstructed. The cells, walls, and entrance were stabilised to prevent further collapse using hardwood pinnings, an innovative technique that is not yet widely used in the conservation of historic buildings.

A new car park and path leading from the A9 were built by RJ Macleod and Highland Conservation Ltd, and information panels with details of the broch and the history of the surrounding area installed along the route.

== Future plans ==
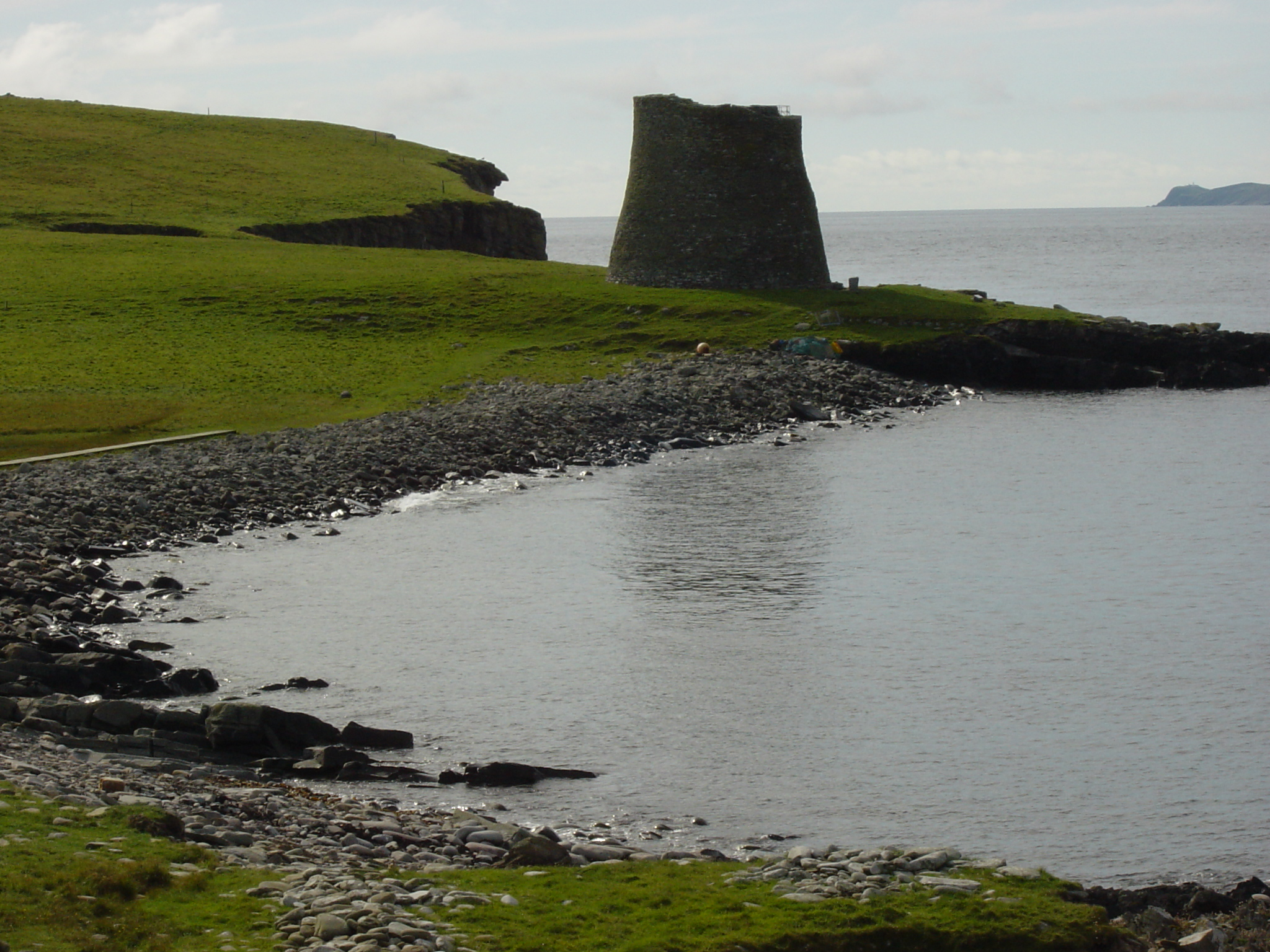
The Broch of Mousa on Shetland, which still stands 13.3 metres (44 ft) high

Alongside these activities, the principal goal of the project remains to construct a replica broch, using technologies that would have been available to Iron Age societies during the period in which these structures were built (generally in the first centuries BC and AD). This will necessarily draw on archaeological research as well as taking inspiration from existing sites, particularly those that are still upstanding: Mousa on Shetland, Dun Carloway on the Isle of Lewis, and Dun Dornaigil in Sutherland are examples of brochs that retain some of their original height.

As some of the most elaborate feats of drystone engineering, the construction will also require input from architects, engineers, and drystone experts. Discussions over the most suitable location for the build are ongoing.

Once complete, the structure will provide a base for a new heritage tourism attraction, comprising an authentic Iron Age living history experience and an exhibition centre. Drystone dyking workshops will also be offered to the general public to raise awareness of a once-thriving traditional industry in Caithness.

== See also ==
- Atlantic roundhouse
- Butser Ancient Farm
- North Coast 500
- Oldest buildings in Scotland
- Scottish Crannog Centre
