= Ousdale Broch =

- Ousdale Burn Broch, Allt a' Bhurg Broch
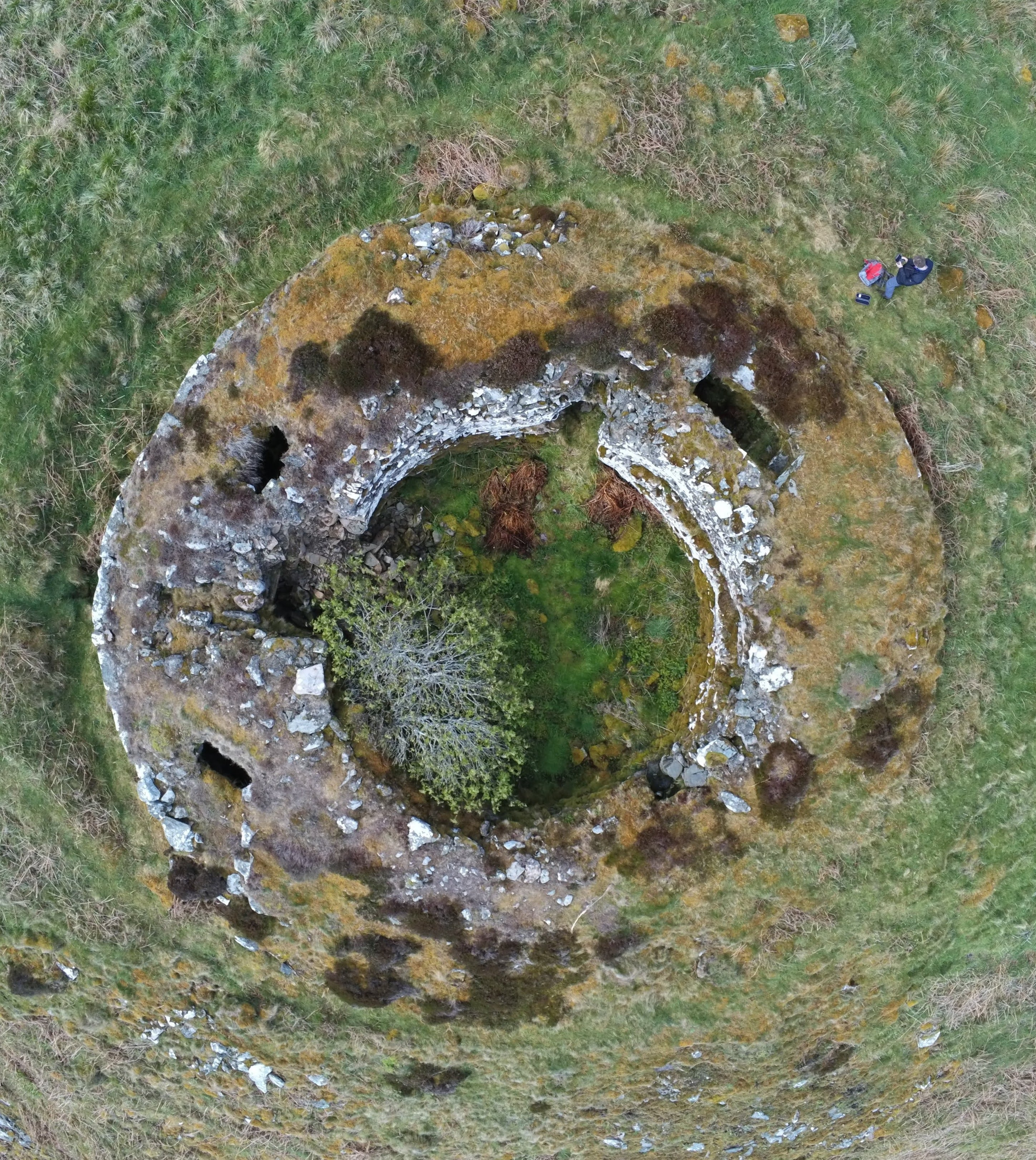
- Aerial view of Ousdale Broch

- Location within Highland
- 58°08′54″N 3°34′46″W
- Type: Broch
- Periods: Iron Age
- Location: Caithness, Scottish Highlands

Ousdale Broch, also known as Ousdale Burn or Allt a’ Bhurg (Scots Gaelic: ‘stream of the fort’) Broch, is an Iron Age broch (drystone tower) located between the villages of Helmsdale and Berriedale in Caithness, Scotland (grid reference ND07131881).

The structure was until recently in a state of disrepair, but conservation works overseen by Caithness Broch Project – a charitable organisation aiming to promote Caithness through its archaeological heritage – between 2015 and 2020 have consolidated the structure and a number of its original features. Additionally, access was improved with the construction of a gravel path to the broch, along which interpretation signs have been installed. The site features on the John o' Groats Trail, a coastal walking route from Inverness to John o' Groats, and is located on the North Coast 500.

== Location ==
Situated near to the small settlement of Ousdale on the A9, the broch is 3.5 miles northeast of Helmsdale, and about 1 mile southwest of the ruined clearance village of Badbea.

The structure itself stands on a narrow terrace at the foot of a long shallow slope. The terrace is bounded to the east by a deep ravine containing the Ousdale Burn, which meets the sea to the southeast, and on the south by a shallower ravine containing the Allt a’ Bhurg. Due to the presence of native birch woodland, the area is designated a Site of Special Scientific Interest (SSSI) by NatureScot.

== Description ==
Ousdale is classified as a ‘second-phase’ broch, dating to the 3rd to 2nd century BC. It has a solid base and an external diameter of around 16 metres, with some walls still reaching over 3 metres in places. A ditch may have surrounded the structure, and there are some indications of outbuildings.

The main entrance is on the southwest, and the passageway, which retains almost all of its original roofing lintels, measures 4.3m long, 1.78m high, and 75 cm in width. The entrance passage contains two sets of door-checks, and there is also a guard cell. The central court has an internal diameter of around 7m, and there is a doorway leading to an intramural stairway, similar to those still surviving at Mousa on Shetland and Dun Telve near Glenelg.

== History ==
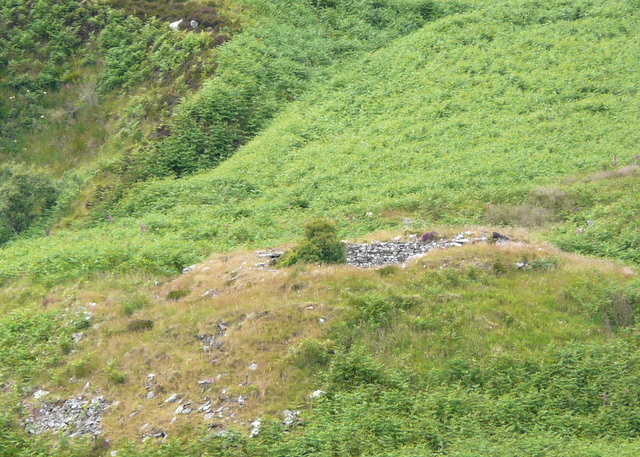
Ousdale Broch as viewed from the east

The area surrounding the broch is rich in both prehistoric and historical archaeological remains. The name ‘Ousdale’ has a Norse origin, suggestive of a strong Norse presence in the area; there are similar indications in the names of neighbouring towns (Helmsdale, Berriedale) and at sites along the east Caithness coast.

Ousdale – or Eyesteindal – is mentioned in the Orkneyinga Saga as the site of a confrontation in 1201 between William the Lion, king of Scotland, and the Norse jarl Harald the Elder (Harald Maddadsson), ruler of Caithness and Orkney. William, upon hearing of Harald's cruel behaviour towards the people of Thurso in asserting his power, had sent an army north to control the jarl. When they finally met at Ousdale, it was clear that Harald was vastly outnumbered and he asked for peace, resolving the situation without conflict.

The remains of Borg, a post-medieval clearance village, are found approximately 100m to the northwest of Ousdale Broch. The ruins of traditional longhouses and enclosures are still visible. The name ‘Borg’ comes from the Old Norse for ‘burg’ or ‘fort’, likely referring to Ousdale broch.

== Archaeological investigation ==
The site was excavated in 1891 by James Mackay, but efforts were concentrated on the interior of the structure and left much of the outer wall still covered. The excavations revealed layers of ash and charcoal on the floor, alongside broken animal bones, large quantities of common periwinkle and limpet shells, and wild hazelnuts. Artefacts recovered included pottery fragments, polished lignite, quern-stones, whetstones, a metalworking crucible, mica schist discs, a segment of a jet armlet, and part of a wooden dish or scoop. The material culture recovered represents a blend of both mainland and Atlantic Iron Age traditions, perhaps reflecting Ousdale's position between two different broch-building archaeological cultures.

A human skeleton was discovered buried face-down by the entrance to the stairs. These were dated to the post-Medieval period when examined in 1891, but with the remains now lost, any reassessment of their age cannot be undertaken. The individual perhaps represents a deviant burial (a culturally atypical burial, often afforded to those excluded from society) or was the victim of a more recent attack, such as the clan feuds of the previous centuries. Deviant burials are known from a wide variety of prehistoric and historical periods, including the Iron Age, so its association with the primary phase of use of the broch is not impossible.

In addition to previous antiquarian efforts, the highly intrusive excavation in 1891 led to the structure becoming unstable, and a buttress was constructed in the interior of the broch by Mackay to provide support.

== Conservation work ==
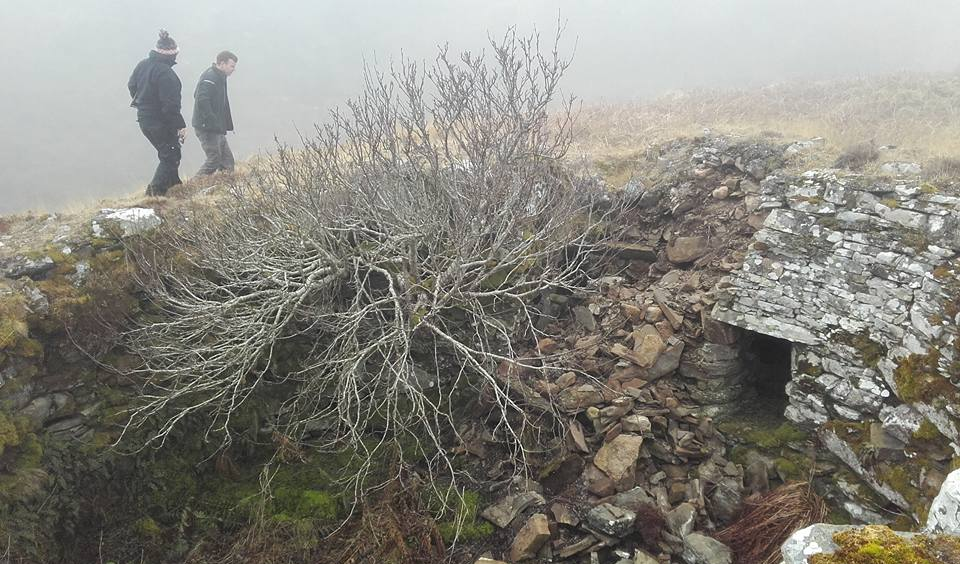
Ousdale Broch during a visit in 2015, before conservation work began

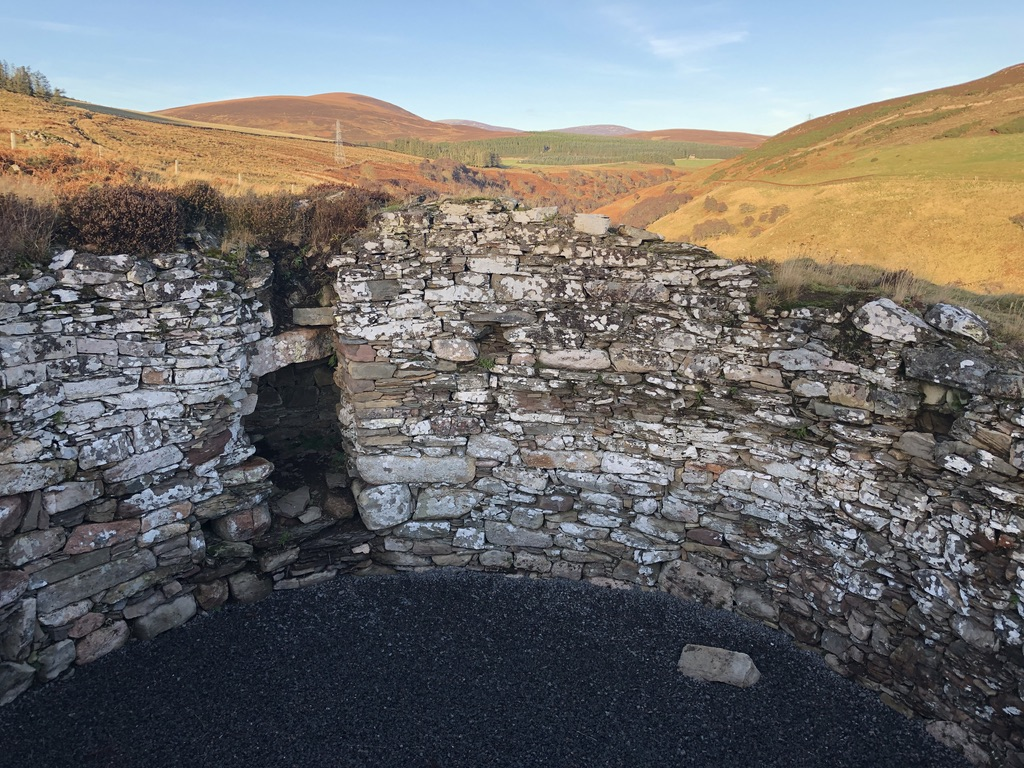
Ousdale Broch in 2020 following conservation and structural consolidation

Work to consolidate the broch took place between 2015 and 2020, after initial visits confirmed that intervention would be required to conserve the structure. Amongst other issues, the buttress built by Mackay had collapsed, a large tree was growing into the interior, and parts of the stonework were beginning to bulge inwards.

The Caithness Broch Project were responsible for initiating and overseeing the conservation efforts: Historic Environment Scotland were approached and approved the consolidation, before a structural inspection and detailed repair plans were undertaken. Funding applications to cover the conservation work, interpretation panels, and a new car park and access trail were submitted successfully.

Environmental and archaeological work took place in 2019, with Clyde Archaeology providing an initial recording of the structure before any interventions were carried out. Vegetation clearance, including the removal of the large tree, and consolidation of the structure then commenced; some features, including the interior staircase and one of the two corbelled guard cells, were conserved, while an aumbry (stone recess) was reconstructed. Stabilisation of the cells, walls, and entrance passage was achieved using hardwood pinnings, a pioneering technique in the conservation of historic buildings. Finally, geotextile and gravel were laid inside the broch to provide safe access, both which had previously been used at Achvarasdal broch during consolidation work there.

The new car park and path leading from the A9 were built by RJ Macleod and Highland Conservation Ltd. Information signage giving the history of the area and details of the broch, compiled and produced by Caithness Broch Project, were installed along the route, creating a short heritage trail for the site.

== See also ==
- Broch
- Atlantic roundhouse
- British Iron Age
- Oldest buildings in Scotland
- Caithness
- North Coast 500
