= Toscaig =

Coordinates: 57.37933°N 5.79941°W

Toscaig: Scottish Gaelic: Toghsgaig
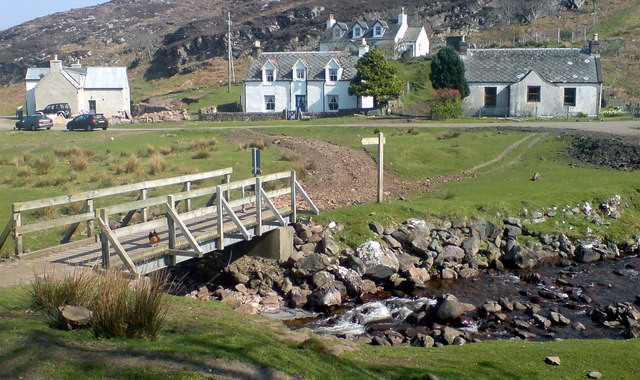
- Footbridge and houses in Toscaig

- Location within the Ross and Cromarty area
- OS grid reference: NG717384
- Council area: Highland
- Country: Scotland
- Sovereign state: United Kingdom
- Post town: Applecross
- Postcode district: IV54 8
- Police: Scotland
- Fire: Scottish
- Ambulance: Scottish

Toscaig (Scottish Gaelic: Toghsgaig) is a small, remote village, at the southern end of the Applecross peninsula, in Wester Ross in the Highlands of Scotland. Toscaig is in the Highland council area, and lies at the head of the south facing sea loch, Loch Toscaig, which in turn links with the Inner Sound.

The village of Applecross lies 5 miles to the north of Toscaig, along the coastal road via the hamlets of Camusterrach and Camusteel.

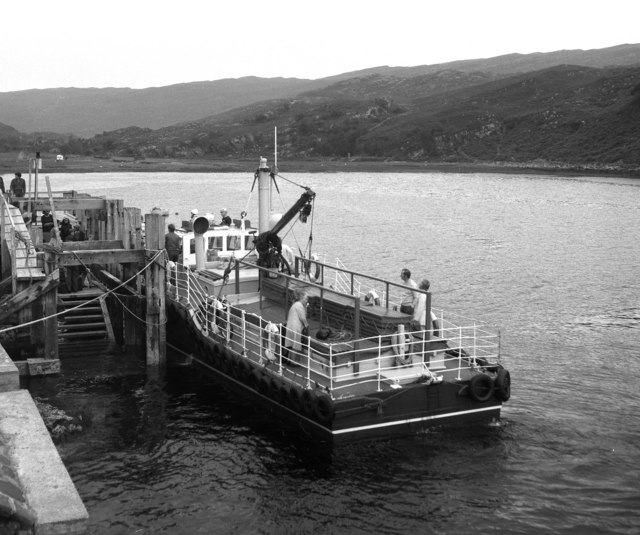
Ferry at Toscaig, 1975

Toscaig once had a ferry service, linking to Kyle of Lochalsh. This service operated between 1955 and 1978, and was the only route into Applecross when the road over the Bealach na Bà was closed.
