= An Sgùrr =

An Sgùrr is a generic Scottish Gaelic word for a rocky peak. There are at least two hills called An Sgùrr in Scotland:

- An Sgùrr (Eigg)
- An Sgùrr (Lochcarron)
