= Evan Finlayson =

Scottish footballer

Personal information
- Full name: Evan Finlayson
- Date of birth: 1876
- Place of birth: Applecross, Scotland
- Date of death: 1931 (aged 54–55)
- Height: 5 ft 9 in (1.75 m)
- Position: Full-back

Senior career*
Years	Team	Apps	(Gls)
1898–1899	Rangers		
1899	Grimsby Town	5	(0)
- * Club domestic league appearances and goals

Evan Finlayson (1876–1931) was a Scottish professional footballer who played as a full-back.
