= Bad a' Chreamha =

Coordinates: 57.37021°N 5.56399°W

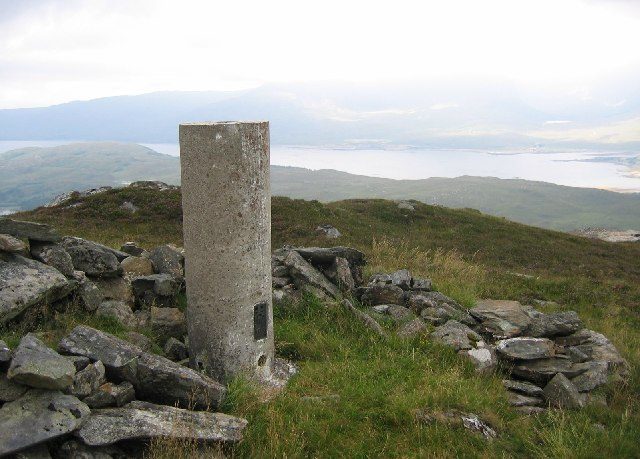
- Loch Kishorn from Bad a'Chreamha summit

Highest point
- Elevation: 395 m (1,296 ft)
- Prominence: 255 m (837 ft)
- Listing: Marilyn

Naming
- English translation: Tuft of the wild garlic
- Language of name: Scots Gaelic
- Pronunciation: Scottish Gaelic: [ˈpat̪ əˈxɾʲɛ̃və]

Geography
- Location within Scotland
- Location: Lochcarron, Scotland
- OS grid: NG858367
- Topo map: OS Landranger 24

Bad a' Chreamha is a small hill in Scotland, occupying the broad peninsula between Loch Carron and Loch Kishorn. It consists of a long low ridge; the northwestern side is marked by a series of broken crags, whilst to the south the hill slopes down to the shores of Loch Carron.

Bad a' Chreamha may be climbed from the path between Achintraid and Reraig, which passes to the west side of the hill, below the crags. The bealach that separates Bad a' Chreamha from An Sgurr lies a kilometre or so east of this path: from here the summit can be reached by skirting above the crags. The hill may also be climbed from the shores of Loch Carron, heading north from the road at any convenient point.
