= Applecross =

Peninsula in Scotland

Coordinates: 57.43304°N 5.80958°W

Applecross: Scottish Gaelic: A' Chomraich; Scots: Applecross
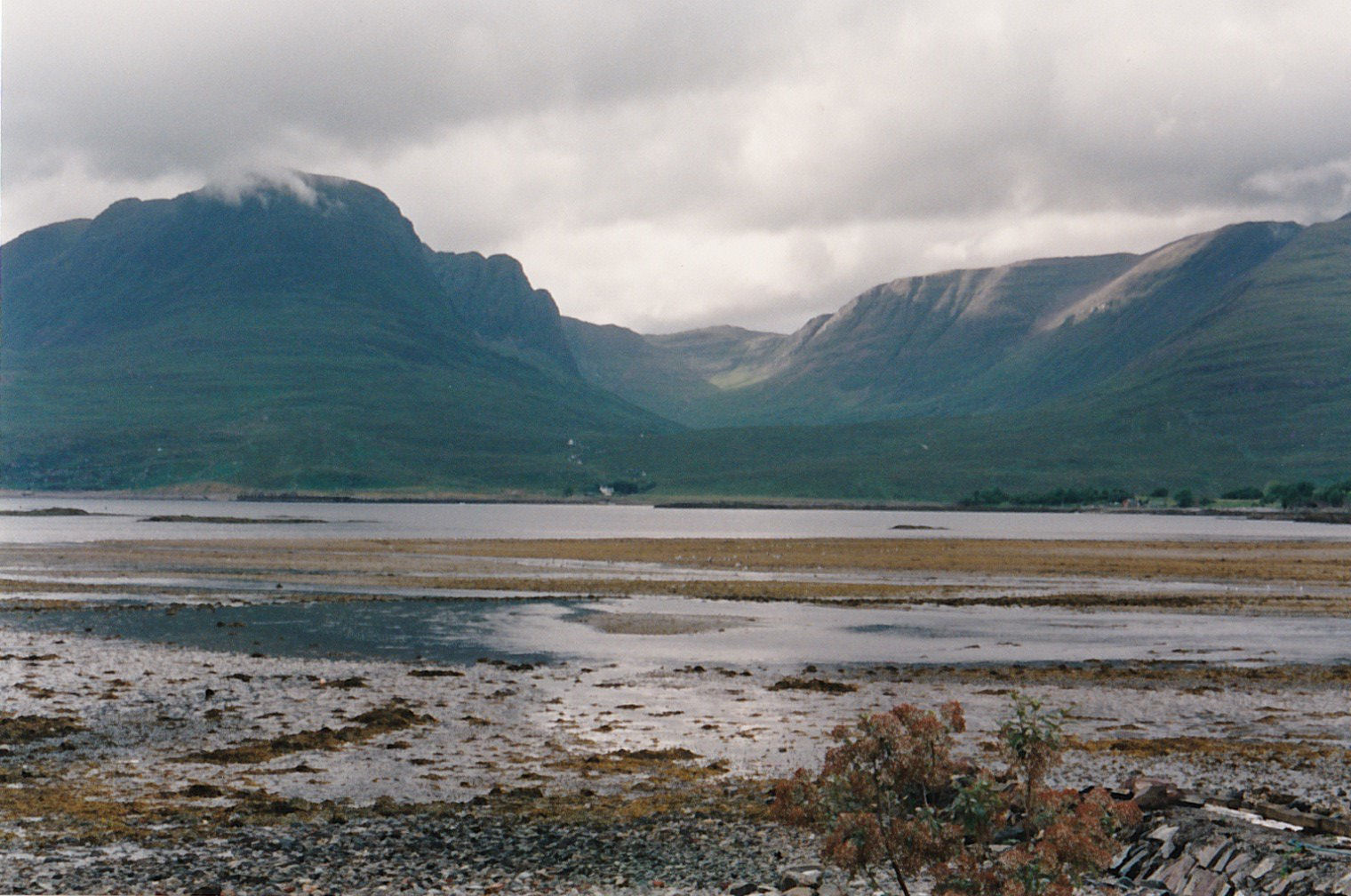
- View across Loch Kishorn to the Applecross peninsula

- Location within the Ross and Cromarty area
- Population: 545
- OS grid reference: NG714444
- Council area: Highland
- Country: Scotland
- Sovereign state: United Kingdom
- Post town: STRATHCARRON
- Postcode district: IV54
- Police: Scotland
- Fire: Scottish
- Ambulance: Scottish
- UK Parliament: Inverness, Skye and West Ross-shire
- Scottish Parliament: Skye, Lochaber and Badenoch

Applecross (Scottish Gaelic: A' Chomraich [ə ˈxoməriç] 'The Sanctuary', historically anglicized as Combrich) is a peninsula in Wester Ross, in the Scottish Highlands. It is bounded by Loch Kishorn to the south, Loch Torridon to the north, and Glen Shieldaig to the east. On its western side is Applecross Bay and the Inner Sound. The peninsula is mountainous, sparsely populated, and has only two small roads joining the mainland. One of these roads traverses the famous Bealach na Bà. The former monastery of Applecross was founded in the 7th century by Saint Máel Ruba in the 7th century; a sculptured stone is all that remains.

== Geography ==
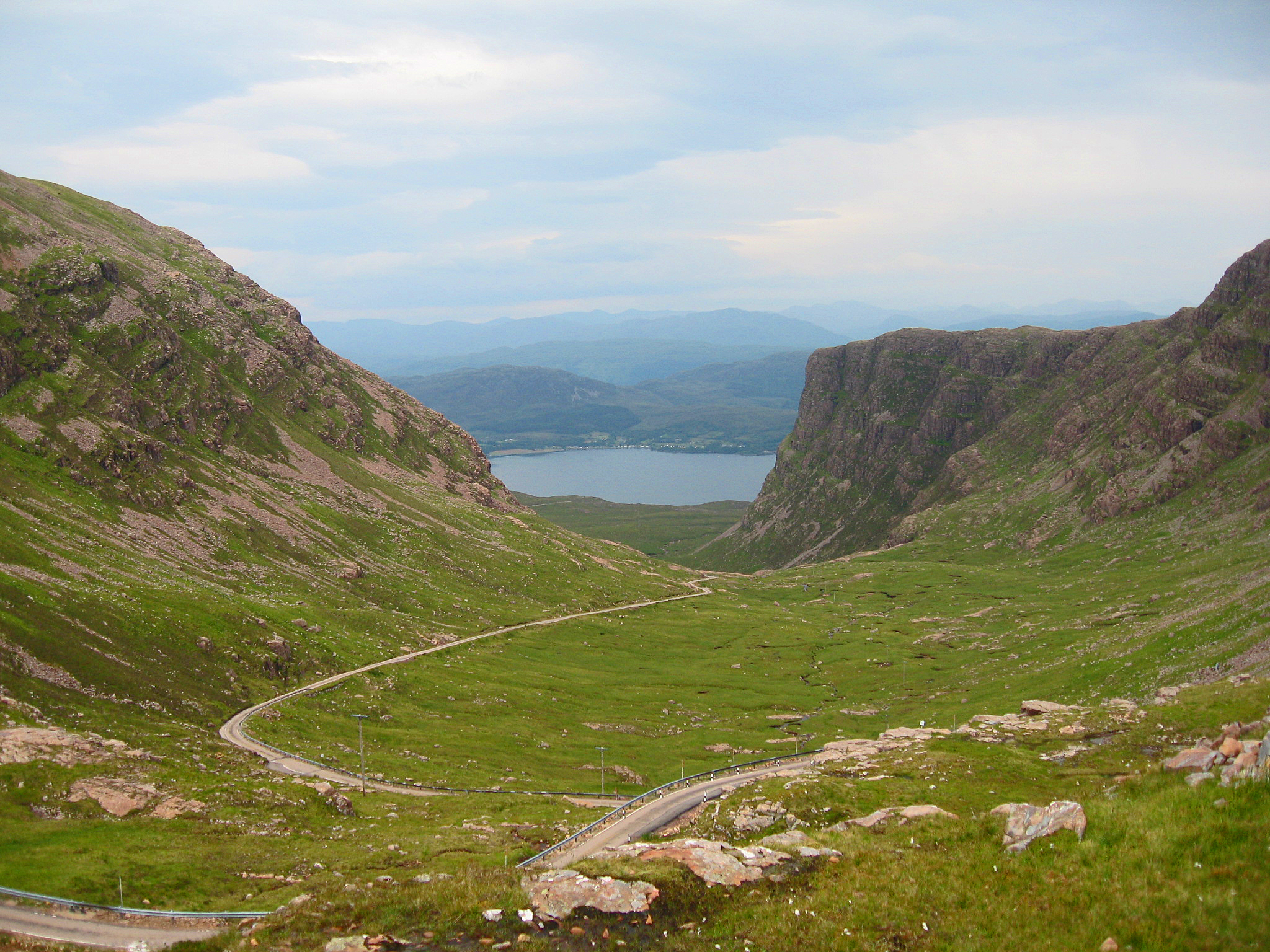
Bealach na Bà was until the mid-1970s the only road linking Applecross with the rest of the country

Extremely isolated, Applecross was accessible only by boat until the early 19th century, and for many years after that the only road access was over one of Scotland's most notoriously treacherous roads, the Bealach na Ba ('Pass of the Cattle'), which crosses the peninsula and reaches a maximum height of 626 m (2,054 ft), below the 792 m (2,598 ft) high Sgùrr a' Chaorachain. In 1975 the settlement was connected via a winding coastal road which travels around the edge of the peninsula to Shieldaig and Torridon. The road skirts the shore of the Inner Sound and Loch Torridon.

This row of houses which is marked as 'Applecross' on some maps, is actually called 'Shore Street' and is referred to locally just as 'The Street'. The name Applecross applies to the whole peninsula, including the settlements of Toscaig, Culduie, Camusterrach and Sand. Applecross is also the name of the local estate and the civil parish, which includes Shieldaig and Torridon, and has a population of 544. The small River Applecross (Scottish Gaelic: Abhainn Crosain) flows into the bay at Applecross.

The Applecross Inn, located on Shore Street was recognised in 2023 by The Scotsman as being among the Top 6 Highland Pubs in Scotland.

== History ==
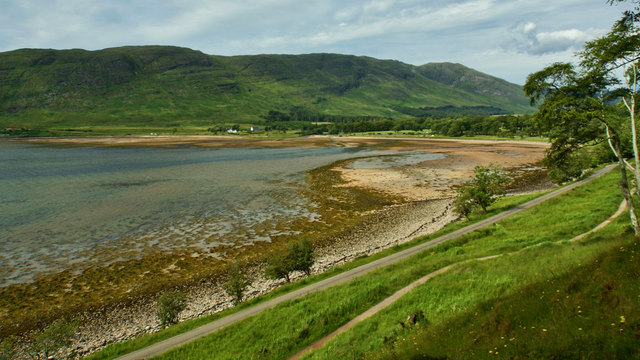
Applecross Bay

Applecross's name is an anglicisation of the Pictish name Aporcrosan, 'confluence of the [river] Crossan' (Obar Crosain in modern Gaelic). The name is derived from the Pictish aber- and Scottish Gaelic cros.

Applecross is linked with Saint Máel Ruba, who came to Scotland in 671 from the major Celtic Church monastery of Bangor Abbey in Ireland. He founded Aporcrosan in 672 in what was then Pictish territory, and was the monastery's first abbot, dying on 21 April 722 in his eightieth year. The deaths of several of his successors as abbot are recorded in the Irish Annals into the early ninth century. The early monastery was located around the site of the later Church of Scotland parish church (present building erected 1817). A large, unfinished cross-slab standing in the churchyard and three extremely finely carved fragments of another preserved within the church are evidence of the early monastery. The surrounding district is known as A’ Chomraich 'the sanctuary' in Gaelic. Its boundaries were once marked by high crosses. The stub of one, destroyed in 1870, survives among farm buildings at Camusterrach.

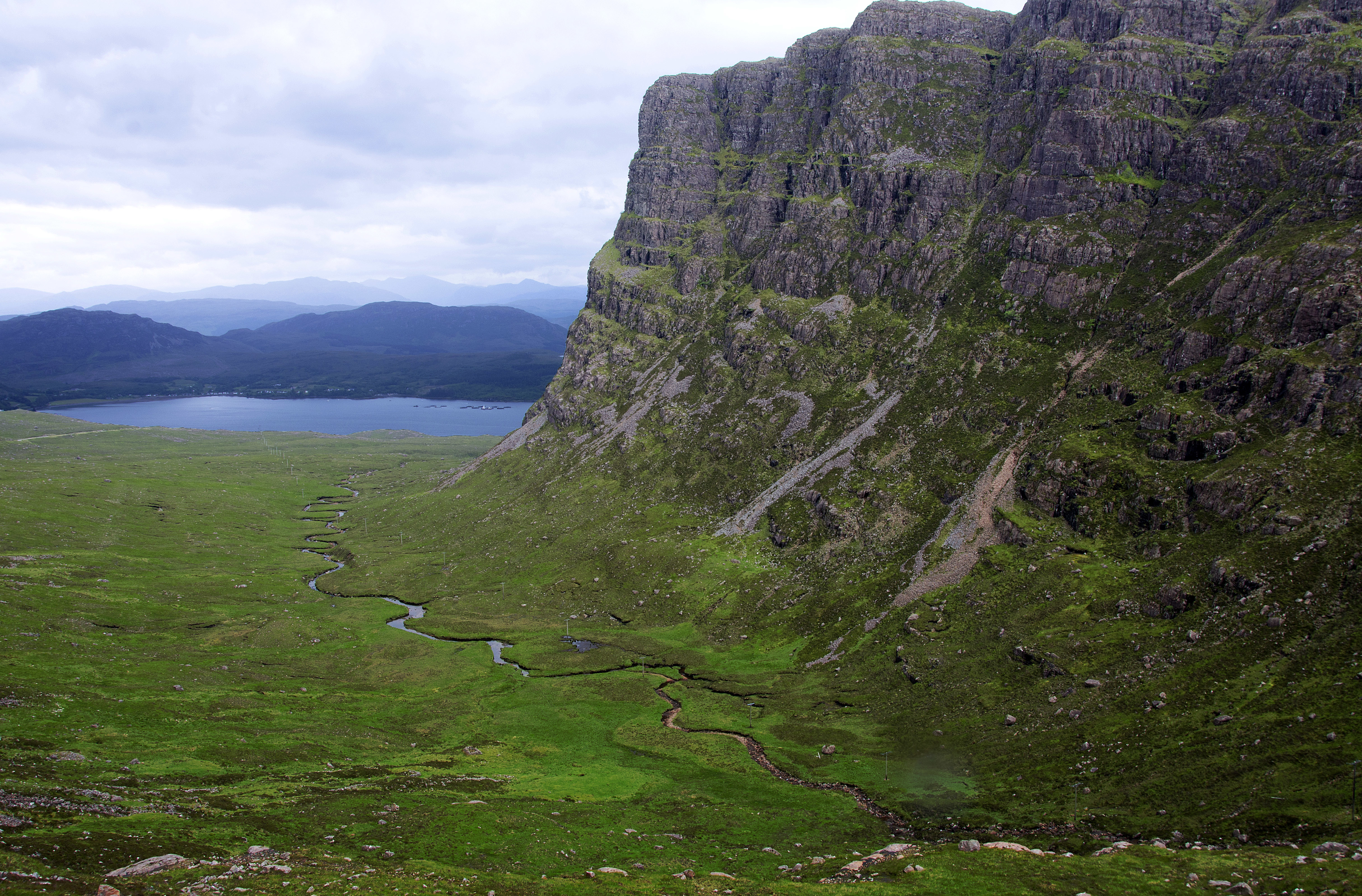
Coire na Bà and the cliffs of Creag a' Chumhaing

During the Scottish Reformation, in the second half of the 16th century, the lands of Applecross were secularised and granted c.1591 to Clan Mackenzie. The estate was eventually inherited by Alexander Mackenzie (died 1650), an illegitimate son of Colin Cam Mackenzie of Kintail. With a brief interruption between 1715 and 1724 (a period of forfeiture caused by the laird of Applecross's role in the Jacobite rising of 1715), the estate remained in the ownership of Mackenzie's heirs until the mid-19th century, when the it was sold to the Duke of Leeds.

In the early 1860s, the estate was sold to Lord Middleton. Following the death of the 10th Baron Middleton in 1924, the estate was sold to the Wills family.

The estate is now owned by the Applecross Trust, a registered Scottish charity with the declared aim of preserving "the special character of the Applecross peninsula in a responsible and progressive manner whilst acknowledging its wilderness heritage and its importance as an area of outstanding natural beauty". The Applecross Trust is overseen by a board of seven people and chaired by Kenneth McDiarmid

== Wildlife ==
Many native Scottish animals can be found in Applecross, including mammals such as Scottish red deer, pine martens, Eurasian otters, water voles, mountain hare, red foxes, a rare Scottish wildcat, and pipistrelle and Daubenton's bats as well as birds such as tawny and barn owls, white-tailed and golden eagles, great skua, arctic tern, great spotted woodpeckers, song thrush, bullfinches, golden plover, skylark, merlin, greenshank, dunlin, red and, occasionally, the rarer black grouse, dotterel, and rock ptarmigan. In terms of marine life there are common seals near the shore, as well as basking sharks, minke whales, porpoises, and bottlenose dolphins. Adders can also be found here.

== Economy ==
In July 2010, at a cost of £40,000, the UK's first unmanned petrol station was opened. It uses a credit card reader to enable customers to serve themselves. The business was taken over by Applecross Community Company in 2008 in response to its possible closure. The only alternative involves a 36-mile (58 km) round trip to Lochcarron.The eponymous Applecross Brewing Company had to locate in Kishorn because there is no three-phase electric power grid in Applecross.

== Tourism ==
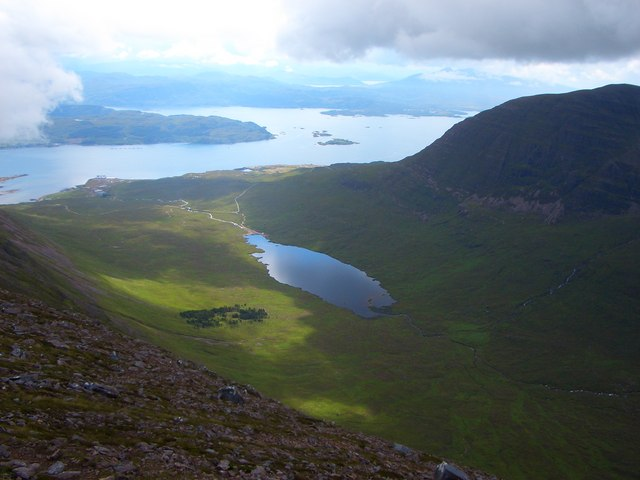
Loch Coire nan Arr

Recently Applecross has experienced an increase in tourism for those looking for a place to hike, kayak, fish, and cycle. The North Coast 500 tourist route crosses the Bealach na Bà pass, which rises to 2,053 feet (626 m) with hairpin bend, goes through Applecross along the coastal road. In 2025, The Daily Telegraph wrote that Bealach na Bà had become a "worldwide motoring phenomenon".

== Media and the arts ==
Applecross appeared as Laxdale in the 1953 film Laxdale Hall, in which the community protests against the poor condition of the access road by withholding their Road Tax.

On television, Applecross appeared as Carnochie in the "Upstairs Downstairs" episode "Will Ye No Come Back Again?" (1975). It later featured in Monty Halls' Great Escape (2009) and an edition of Channel 4's Time Team (series 13, episode 13) when a broch (hollow-walled structure) was excavated.

It is mentioned in the writings of Margaret Leigh; particularly in 'Driftwood and Tangle'. It is also the setting for Graeme Macrae Burnet's 2015 novel His Bloody Project which was nominated for the Man Booker Prize in 2016. It also was the main setting of the "Enchanted Emporium" series by Pierdomenico Baccalario.

== Climate ==
Climate data for Bealach Na Ba No 2 (773 metres asl) 1981–2010
Month	Jan	Feb	Mar	Apr	May	Jun	Jul	Aug	Sep	Oct	Nov	Dec	Year
Mean daily maximum °C (°F)	1.6 (34.9)	1.2 (34.2)	2.2 (36.0)	3.6 (38.5)	6.9 (44.4)	9.1 (48.4)	10.5 (50.9)	10.5 (50.9)	8.7 (47.7)	6.0 (42.8)	3.5 (38.3)	2.3 (36.1)	5.5 (41.9)
Mean daily minimum °C (°F)	−2.1 (28.2)	−2.4 (27.7)	−1.5 (29.3)	−0.4 (31.3)	2.1 (35.8)	4.7 (40.5)	6.6 (43.9)	6.7 (44.1)	5.1 (41.2)	2.9 (37.2)	0.1 (32.2)	−1.2 (29.8)	1.7 (35.1)
Source: metoffice.gov.uk
