= Sgùrr a' Chaorachain =

Sgùrr a' Chaorachain may refer to either of the following mountains in the Scottish Highlands:

- Sgùrr a' Chaorachain (Corbett)
- Sgùrr a' Chaorachain (Munro)
