= Sanachan =

Sanachan may refer to:

- Sana-chan, a fictional character in Japanese manga comic Sana's Stage or Kodocha
- Sanachan, a settlement in the vicinity of Loch Kishorn, Scotland
