= An Sgùrr (Lochcarron) =

Hill in western Scotland

Coordinates: 57.38809°N 5.56739°W

Highest point
- Elevation: 392 m (1,286 ft)
- Prominence: c. 205 m
- Listing: Marilyn

Naming
- English translation: The (rocky) peak
- Language of name: Gaelic
- Pronunciation: Scottish Gaelic: [ən ˈs̪kuːrˠ]

Geography
- Location: Lochcarron, Scotland
- OS grid: NG857387
- Topo map: OS Landranger 24

An Sgùrr is a hill in Scotland, occupying the broad peninsula between Loch Carron and Loch Kishorn. It has the appearance of a rough knoll, with small crags ringing the summit, particularly on the western side.

The hill may be climbed from a number of locations. The A896 road passes some two kilometres to the north, whilst a forestry track from south of Lochcarron allows access to the southeast. The path between Achintraid and Reraig passes to the south west side of An Sgùrr; the summit may be reached from Bealach that separates An Sgùrr from Bad a' Chreamha, which lies a kilometre or so east of this path.
