= Ardarroch =

Coordinates: 57.39341°N 5.60313°W

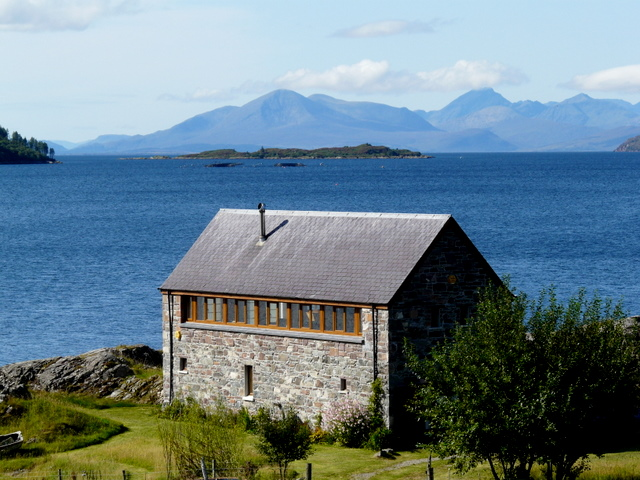
- Ardarroch, looking across to Skye.

- Location within the Ross and Cromarty area
- OS grid reference: NG835394
- Council area: Highland
- Country: Scotland
- Sovereign state: United Kingdom
- Post town: Kishorn
- Postcode district: IV54 8
- Police: Scotland
- Fire: Scottish
- Ambulance: Scottish
- UK Parliament: Inverness, Skye and West Ross-shire
- Scottish Parliament: Caithness, Sutherland and Ross

Ardarroch is a small hamlet, located in what is commonly known as the Kishorn area, on the north east shore of Loch Kishorn, within the Strathcarron, Ross-shire, Scotland. It lies in the Scottish council area of Highland.

== See also ==
- Loch Kishorn
