= Culduie =

Coordinates: 57.3944°N 5.80368°W

Culduie: Scottish Gaelic: Cùil Duibh
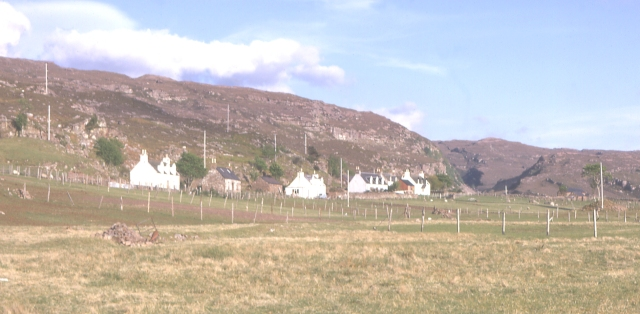
- Croft cottages at Culduie

- Location within the Ross and Cromarty area
- OS grid reference: NG715401
- Council area: Highland
- Country: Scotland
- Sovereign state: United Kingdom
- Postcode district: IV54 8
- Police: Scotland
- Fire: Scottish
- Ambulance: Scottish

Culduie (Scottish Gaelic: Cùil Duibh) is a small hamlet, located on the southwest corner on Applecross peninsula, which is south of Applecross Village (Shore Street) in Strathcarron, Ross-shire Scottish Highlands and is in the Scottish council area of Highland.

Culduie looks over the bay of Pola-creadh towards the hamlet of Ard-dubh. Fishing was one of the main sources of income for Applecross residents and the bay still has a few active fishing boats mainly for prawn fishing these days. The hamlet is the place where the fictional events described in His Bloody Project by Graeme Macrae Burnet take place.
