= Loch Kishorn =

Coordinates: 57.386°N 5.636°W

Kishorn: Scottish Gaelic: Ciseòrn
- Location within the Ross and Cromarty area
- Population: 136
- OS grid reference: NG785348
- Community council: Lochcarron
- Council area: Highland
- Lieutenancy area: Ross and Cromarty
- Country: Scotland
- Sovereign state: United Kingdom
- Post town: Strathcarron
- Postcode district: IV54 8X
- Dialling code: 01520 733
- Police: Scotland
- Fire: Scottish
- Ambulance: Scottish

Loch Kishorn (Scottish Gaelic: Ciseòrn) is a sea loch in the north-west Highlands of Scotland. Kishorn is a collective name used to refer to a group of populated settlements located next to the loch.

== Topography ==
Loch Kishorn is a northern branch of Loch Carron about 1.5 kilometres (1 mi) wide and 4 kilometres (2 mi) long, with a maximum recorded depth of around 92 metres (302 ft). It is fed by the river Abhainn Cumhag a' Ghlinne and the River Kishorn which flows from the north and enters through a small estuary. To the north and west of the loch is the Applecross peninsula; to the east is a headland that separates it from upper Loch Carron. The mouth of the loch is marked by the Garra Islands, the largest of which is Kishorn Island.

There are several small settlements located in the vicinity of the loch: Sanachan, Tornapress, Courthill, Achintraid, Ardarroch and Rhunasoul. It is common to refer to these populated settlements collectively as Kishorn.

A Scottish Episcopal chapel is located at Courthill between Sanachan and Tornapress. The A896 road passes through Sanachan, and a minor road leads off to the other settlements. Ardarroch is on the lochside, next to a small shingly beach. The next settlement, Achintraid, is further up the loch. It consists of a line of whitewashed cottages, originally built to house crofters evicted in the Highland Clearances. Rhunasoul is the final populated settlement at the end of the minor road. Achintraid and Rhunasoul are noted for the extensive views of the Applecross peninsula, with the Corbetts of Sgùrr a' Chaorachain and Beinn Bhàn and the pass of the Bealach na Bà being particularly prominent.

East of Kishorn are two small Marilyns: An Sgurr and Bad a' Chreamha. Tornapress is where the junction to the Bealach na Bà is located.

== Kishorn Yard ==
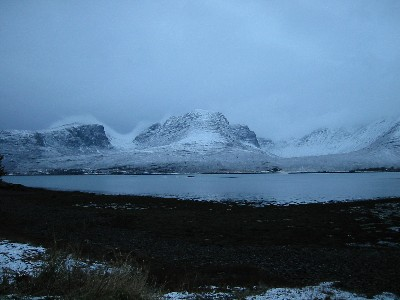
View from Achintraid across Loch Kishorn. Kishorn Yard was on the far shore.

Kishorn Yard is a fabrication yard at Loch Kishorn for oil platforms and other offshore facilities, with an associated port and dry-dock facility. It is currently jointly owned by two companies, Ferguson Transport and Leiths.

The yard was owned by Howard Doris between 1975 and 1987. In 1975 work began on the construction yard and dock for the production of oil platforms on the north side of the loch. This lay at the end of a two-mile (three-kilometre) stretch of road built to provide access in just 12 days, and by 1977 over 3,000 people were working here, housed in temporary accommodation on site and in two accommodation ships moored in the loch: the former car ferries Rangatira and Odysseus. Loch Kishorn offers a clear depth of up to 80 metres (260 ft), and the yard was therefore well suited to build the 600,000-tonne concrete Ninian Central Platform, which was built in 1978. Material was supplied by sea and when complete the platform needed seven tugs to tow it to its operating position in the North Sea. The Ninian Central Platform held the record as the largest movable object ever created by man until 1989 when the Gullfaks C platform at 1.5 million tons took the record.

The Ninian storage platform nearing completion.

Mindful of the controversy surrounding an earlier proposal to develop a yard at Drumbuie, a condition of the planning permission was that the site had to be treated as an island: a self-contained village for 2,000 workers was created, and all deliveries would arrive by sea, rather than by road. A depot for transferring deliveries from rail to sea was built at Stromeferry, on the Kyle of Lochalsh Line. These conditions, though slightly relaxed by the end of the yard's life, had the intended effect of not altering the surrounding area much.

By 1980 the construction yard was diversifying in an effort to escape a downturn in oil exploration and production and at the time was building the Phillips Maureen hi-deck, but its days were numbered. Two thousand people were still employed in 1984, but bankruptcy (by parent company John Howard over its Middle East contracts) in 1986 was followed by closure in 1987 and clearance of most of the buildings on the site. One lasting impact is the Howard Doris Trust. Amongst other things, it has provided a lot of funding for the Howard Doris Centre in nearby Lochcarron, which provides care for the elderly.

In 1992 the dry dock was put to use in the construction of the 2,300-tonne bridge footings for the Skye Bridge that links Kyle of Lochalsh with the Isle of Skye.

The 120 m quayside, which is split into the East gate and West gate, is currently used by Ferguson Transport & Shipping as a port for fish farming supplies, forestry products, round wood, road salt and fertilizer.

In 2006, Leiths (Scotland) Ltd commenced quarrying operations on the site, supplying concrete for precast blocks for the Raasay Ferry Terminal. Leiths and Ferguson Transport have created a new joint venture company, Kishorn Port Limited to promote the regeneration of the Yard and the dry dock as a manufacturing centre for the offshore renewables industry.

In January 2017, it was announced that Kishorn Port Ltd had been awarded £500,000 to test and revamp the dry dock gates. The East gate had not been moved since 1992 when the caissons for the Skye Bridge were built in the dry dock. The West gate had not been moved since the Maureen Articulated Loading Column ("ALC") vacated the dock in 1982. The dry dock itself had since been completely drained and inspected now that the gates are back in place and fully sealed. It took almost a week of 24-hour pumping to drain all the water, an estimated 32 megalitres (7 million imperial gallons). In August of 2026 the expansion of the drydock was moving forward.

== The Kishorn Commandos ==
Gordon Menzies of the folk band Gaberlunzie wrote a well known song called "The Kishorn Commandos", the chorus to which is:

We're the Kishorn Commandos way up in Wester Ross
We've never had a gaffer, we've never had a boss
But we'll build the biggest oil-rig you've ever come across
Remember we're the Kishorn Commandos
