= Sculptured stones =

Early Christian commemorative monuments

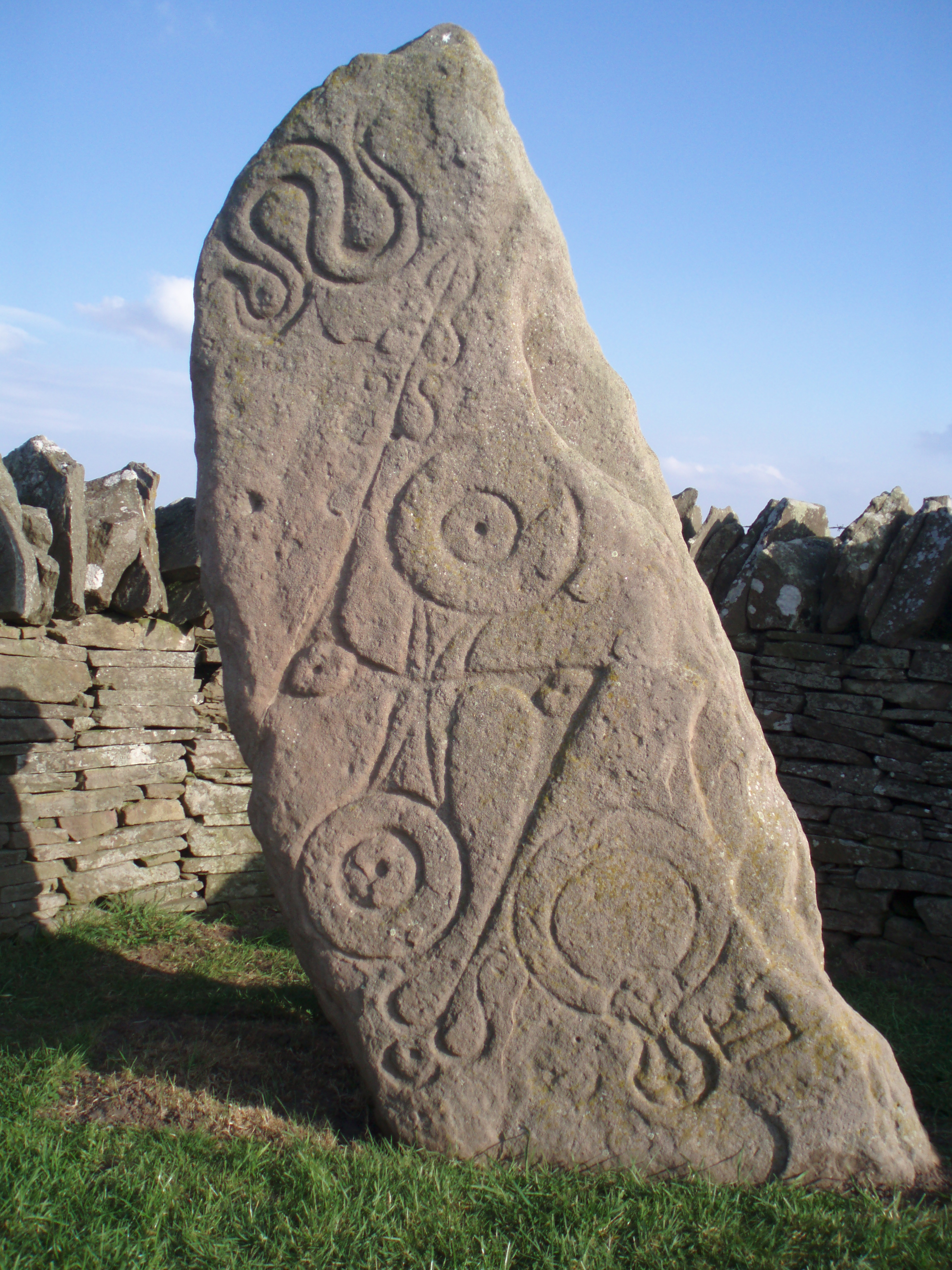
Serpent stone of the Aberlemno sculptured stones

Sculptured stones are carved stone monuments from the early Christian period excavated in various parts of the British Isles and Scandinavia. They document the conversion of these areas to Christianity.

They are usually rough-hewn slabs or boulders, and may be standing upright or lying down. Many have runic or lettered inscriptions on them that are in Ogham, Scandinavian runes (Old Norse), or Latin. Some are crosses with Celtic knots and other interlacing patterns. Many resemble those found on Celtic scriptures of the Gospels.

Sculptured stones are usually found near ancient ecclesiastical sites, and their date is approximately fixed according to the character of the ornamentation. The stones date from the 26th century BCE to the 16th century CE.

== Wales ==
Many of the inscribed stones in Wales are found near churches. Most of the stones have been dated to the period between the time of the Romans leaving Britain and the arrival of the Normans. They serve as records of Wales’ conversion to the Christian church.

Some of the inscriptions are runic or lettered; a variety of Latin and Ogham inscriptions survive, with some being bilingual. Others were decorated crosses.

Some of the monuments were first discovered in the Victorian era by Edward Lhuyd, when many medieval buildings were knocked down and new ones built on top of them. Some were in walls while others were found in the foundations (which were often re-used by the Victorians for their new buildings).

There are various theories as to the stones' purpose. Victor Erle Nash-Williams has suggested the stones were memorials and gravestones. Nancy Edwards theorized the stones functioned as property ownership boundary markers. There is also evidence that the sculptured stones were reused to build churches; others were still used as grave markers but for a different person's grave. For example, an inscribed stone from Penbryn located near a cairn describes a grave of an Irish man, but when the cairn was later excavated, a Roman urn was found in it instead of the remains of the Irish man mentioned on the stone.

More sites with stones were repurposed by invading Anglo-Saxons to claim the land as theirs. Edwards suggests the later settlers may have believed the original graves were those of their ancestors, and felt a claim to the land. Stones have been found on the edges of Roman roads, perhaps marking boundaries.

There were two clusters of stones focused on. One was in northwest Wales, which had more Latin inscriptions and were either of "Group II" or "Group III"—the grouping of which was created by Nash-Williams. Group II stones are those with crosses on them and more closely associated with churches and church cemeteries, but not monastic sites. Group III stones are crosses and cross slab stones that are found near monasteries.

The other cluster was in the southwest and had more ogham and bilingual inscriptions. This may be because there were more Irish settlements in the area, including the Kingdom of Dyfed, which was once occupied by the Irish until the fifth century. These stones were Group I, which are mainly just inscriptions and associated with both burial sites and churchyards and may have indicated boundaries and land ownerships.

In Glamorgan, a possible stone was discovered when the Glamorgan-Gwent Archaeological Trust was excavating a Bronze-age settlement on peninsula near the River Severn. It was found in a pit in ten fragments, and some pieces were scorched. The archaeologists believed that its last use was a baking plate, as some charcoaled substances were found on top of it. On the smooth side of the stone near the middle, some incisions in the surface looked like runes of Anglo-Saxon or Scandinavian origin. On the edges, more incisions were found, which looked closer to ogham runes; if so, this would make it a rare example of a bilingual stone. (There are three known bilingual stones, one in Ireland and two on the Isle of Man.) However, the ogham inscriptions do not make linguistic sense, and may be pseudo-ogham runes. The uncertainty over the inscription makes it hard to date the stones accurately.

=== Anglesey ===
The stones located on Anglesey, the large western Welsh island, have a decidedly Scandinavian appearance and have been dated to the Viking Age (10th–12th centuries). There are more than forty different pieces: thirteen of these are standing stones and over twenty are cross-carved stones. There are only thirteen memorial stones from the fifth through seventh centuries.

Two of these stones are free-standing crosses, found in Penmon. They were carved in the ring-chain style associated with the Viking Borre style . One has the Temptation of St Anthony carved into it with horsemen and animals. Another has also the ring-chain and has abstract patterning and frets, or key patterns. Both stones are made from limestone with a red staining that comes from a still active quarry nearby. Stones made from limestone from this quarry and with the same red stain can be found as far away as Bardsey Island and mainland Wales.

Other notable stones on Anglesey include a large cross-carved stone in Llanfihangel Tre’r Beirdd in Twrcelyn, and a ringed cross head carved with interlace found in Llangaffo. These stones are also limestone, but do not come from quarries in Penmon since they lack the red stain.

== Scotland ==
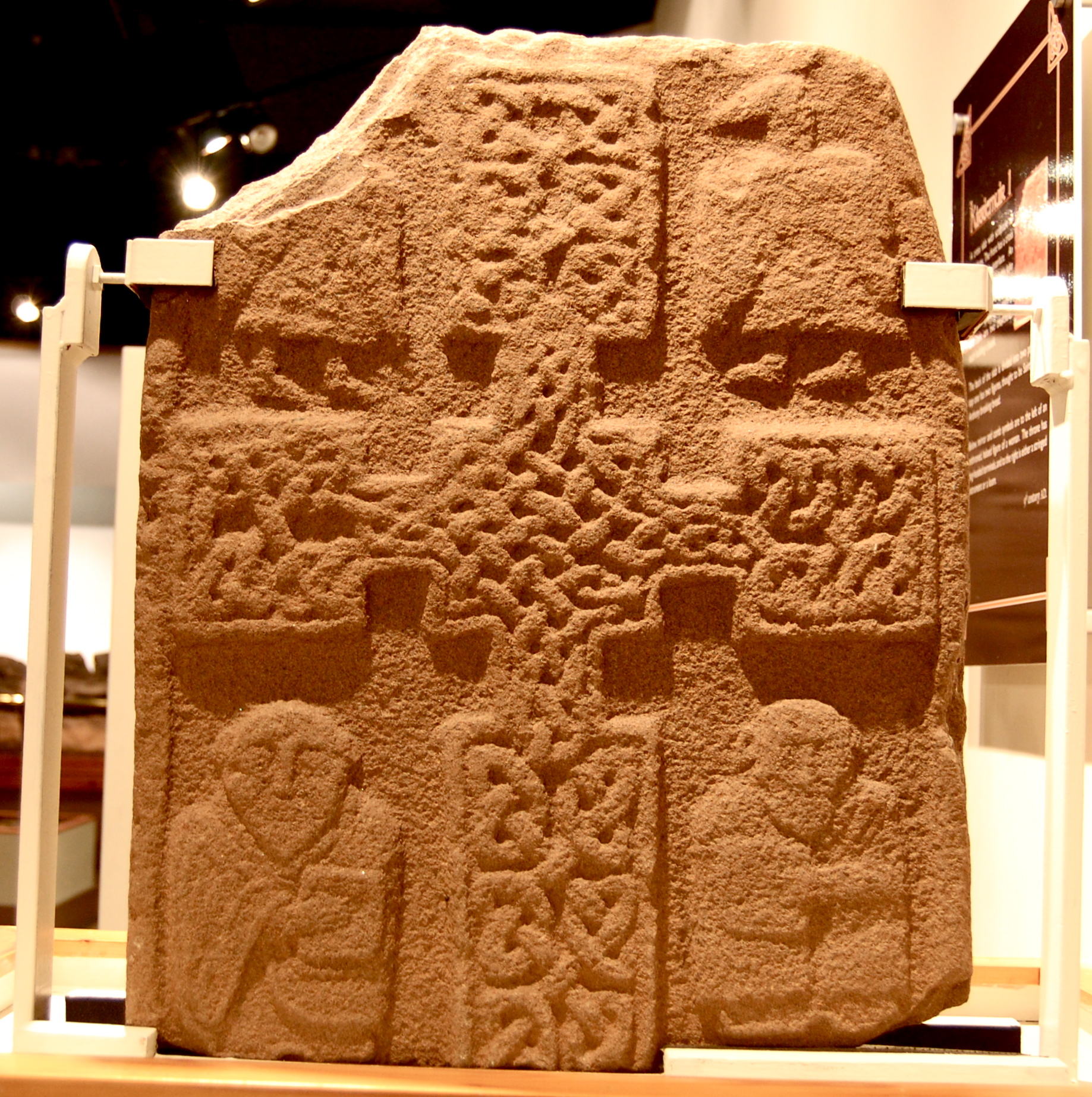
Cross-stone from the Kirriemuir sculptured stones

Some of the more well-known Pictish stones are found in Aberlemno, Monifieth, and Kirriemuir, on the east side of Scotland, and are dated from the 7th to 8th centuries.

On the westside of the country, some younger stones (from the fourteenth to sixteenth centuries), have been found in three areas: Luss, Inchcailloch, and Loch Lomond, and Glendaruel. In Luss, there are four stones that hold interest. One stone, which is double-sided, lies west of Saint Kessog, a well-known church in Luss and is a hog-backed classed stone that's almost six feet in length. Hog-backed stones are curved and tend to look like an upside down boat. One side has a long series of arches (arcade) that are interlaced and in relief. The opposite side has a smaller arcade in the center with studs in the spaces between the arch arms. To the right, there is a relieved quatrefoil that is encircled and two incised decorative circles.

A second stone on the south side that was heavily covered in moss, has a claymore, which is a type of sword, on one side of the stone, with two steps outlined beneath the tip. Beside it is a shaft with four incised saucer-like circles arranged in a square that's parallel to the hilt of the sword. This design is common in the western Highlands.

Inchcailloch has three stones of note that lie in the ruins of St Kentigerna. The first one is similar to the previous one described, but has the claymore set inside a cross. There is lettering on the lower half that was added later when the stone was reused for another grave, which was common.

The second stone is fragmented and has a cross with the initials IHS engraved in the center of the cross. Each of the top three arms terminates in a fleur-de-lys. The earliest appearance of the fleur-de-lys was not until the mid-fourteenth century, suggesting that this stone was made in the fifteenth century at least, perhaps one of the last to be laid before the church ceased to be used by the parish.

The third stone is very large and defaced. Like the first stone, there is a claymore, but it lies in the center of the stone. Above the hilt are four interlaced quatrefoil knots arranged to form a circle. It has a rope-molded border as well.

In Glendaruel, which is in Argyleshire, four stones around the St Modan church are of note. The first stone is made up of two sections. The top section has a figure holding a spear that's typical of Western Highlanders. It has a border around the figure that ends in a leaf at the top of the stone. The second section contains pairs of animal figures and some interlacing decoration.

The second stone is defaced, but has indications of a similar highlander figure with an animal at its feet, most likely a dog. There are traces of interlacing around it. The third stone is also defaced, but has traces of a clergy figure with a staff. All three of these stones are found in a small enclosure near the church.

The fourth stone is found outside of the enclosure and is divided into three horizontal panels. The top panel has four animals surrounded by interlacing, which includes their tails. The top two are horses, while the bottom two are upside down hares. A Guilloché design separates the top panels. The second panel is a large interlaced pattern. A fret band separates the lower panels. The lower panel has two pairs of lions that are sideways and carrying weapons in their paws. The top lion of each pair faces the line of frets, while the bottom faces the tapered edge of the stone. A triangular leaf shape is carved into the bottom edge of the stone.

Elsewhere in Scotland, there were four stones found in a Neolithic settlement in Pool, Sanday, Orkney. They are made of black micaceous siltstone from between the 26th and 24th centuries B.C.E. One has a faint cross incised on it, with other fine incisions on it; the rest of the surface was polished smooth. They are similar to those seen on the plaques found on the Isle of Man.

== Ireland ==
Four stones found in County Wexford, Ireland, known as the “Marigold Stones of Wexford have been found to have similar motifs from similar ones across the sea in Wales. The Irish stones are from Kilmuckridge, an old monastic site which used to be called Cill Mucrois. One possible connection linking the stones to Wales was the site was said to be founded by a Welsh saint. The designs of the four stones are similar to each other, suggesting they were made together. The motif of an encircled marigold cross, also called the cross-of-arcs, was common in the British Isles, but what made these unique was the inclusion of a smaller Latin cross, which was only seen in one other place in Ireland: Ferns, another monastic site not too far up the eastern coast.

The locations of the similar stones in Wales are almost directly across the Irish Seas from Kilmuckridge and Ferns, which are St Davids Cathedral, St Dogmaels, and Llanbadarn Fawr, Ceredigion. The most similar one being a cross slab at St David.

Colbert also related a story of Sulien, a Welsh ecclesiastic, bringing a copy of a book called the Life of St Maedoc, from Ferns to St. David's. This suggests a connection between the two places and why there was a similarity between the two groups of stones. However, the stones at Kilmuckridge are the only visible remains of Cill Mucrois. A Church of Ireland was built on top of the demolished monastery.

Three of the stones are crosses, while one is a slab-cross. The marigold motifs are six-petaled and encircled, and are near the top third of the crosses. The lower part contains the rare smaller Latin cross. No other stones have been found in Ireland to have these additions, but they have been found in Britain. However, many marigold stones do exist in Ireland, mostly in Gallen, County Offaly, along the River Shannon. The cross-of-arcs are frequent motifs in Christian iconography in the early medieval era. They are mostly found on waterways and coasts and the Isle of Man.

Cross 1 has the encircled marigold on its northern face, with a false relief on the southern side and was found on the border of Killannaduff. It is currently located at Ferns Visitor Centre, but was once at the Wexford County Museum Cross 2's bottom half was broken off with only the cross head remaining. It was found 200 meters from Cross 1, just over the border of Killannaduff, and then also went to the Wexford County Museum, but its current location is unknown, when the museum was redistributed. Both stones have short stems coming out of them. NO edge triangular stones.

Cross 3 looks a little different from the other two, having more lines down the shaft of the cross and on the arms. Its stem is much longer than on the other two, going down most of the shaft. It was found much closer to the church. Colbert suggests that Crosses 1 and 2 denote the outer boundaries of the parish, while Cross 3 marks a smaller enclosure of the estate. A major road runs inline with the stones, making them act like they were road markers. The fourth stone is a slab and was meant to be laying down, rather than standing upright, since only one side is carved. It was discovered recently in a Ferns graveyard by Christopher Corlett in 2011. It also has a stem and small Latin cross.

All four stones date between the tenth and twelfth centuries, which is much later than many of the stones found in Gallen and South Wales that also carry the marigold motif, which are dated no later than the ninth century. It suggests that the Wexford stones were inspired by the stones in Wales and Gallen.

The making of the crosses is more about the ratio of the geometric shapes than the actual size or measurements of the various parts. It seems evident that the makers of the crosses had some tools, such as a compass for drawing circles. The High crosses are some of the most well-known stone crosses known in the British Isles.

Many of the sculptured stone crosses have inward curving “armpits,” which are the junctions of the cross arms and the long stem. The designs of the crosses are also similar to those seen in illuminated manuscripts, such as the Book of Kells. However, Robert Stevik explains that though the designs of the crosses are similar, no two are ever exactly the same because only the same methods for making each are used, but not the same steps. Compasses and straight edges are used to construct them but each step may not be followed in that specific order. The complexity of the designs are from commodulation of more geometric shapes and symmetry. Most of the stone crosses have rings, which Stevick has suggested are there in part to stabilize the arms of the cross from breaking due to wind and other weather, as they are the most fragile part of the crosses in the particular design that have them at the upper part of the upright part of the cross.

== Scandinavia ==
There are about 2000 different runestones throughout Scandinavia. The majority are in Sweden, with only about fifty in Norway and two hundred in Denmark. The stones tend to commemorate different family members and also include stories of conversion to Christianity. Picture stones are well-known sculptured stones from the Scandinavian area.

Some other sculptured stones are runestones in Sweden. Although runestones are scattered throughout the Scandinavian area, two sets of these stones in the Uppland tell stories through their runes, which are Norse, and are bound by a double-ended snake. The first set are the Hillersjö stone and Snattsta Runestones, which tell the story of mother and daughter, Gerlög and Inga.

The second set of stones are called the Ingvar runestones. Ingvar was a powerful chieftain who went on a failed expedition to the east, which Anouk Busset speculates might have been Georgia, since this expedition is mentioned in the Georgia Chronicle. There are more than twenty stones in this set, which are commemorative markers of the followers of Ingvar who died along the way, including Ingvar himself. The stones were erected not long after each person's death; the stones date 1010 to 1050 CE, which was the period of the expedition.

== See also ==
- Aberlemno sculptured stones
- Monifieth sculptured stones
- Kirriemuir sculptured stones
