= Sgùrr a' Chaorachain (Corbett) =

Mountain in Highland, Scotland

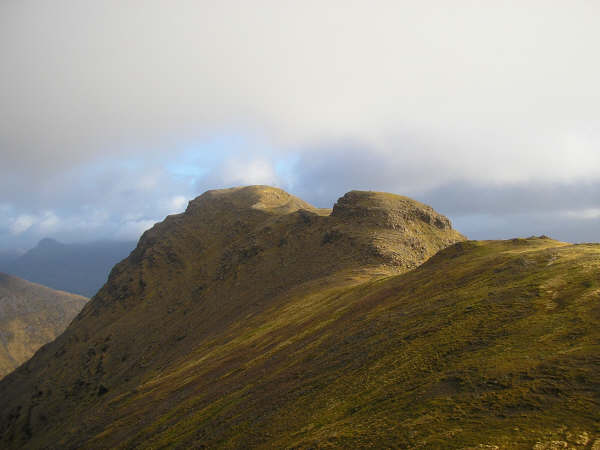
- Sgurr a' Chaorachain

Highest point
- Elevation: 792 m (2,598 ft)
- Prominence: 209 m (686 ft)
- Listing: Corbett, Marilyn
- Coordinates: 57°24′45″N 5°40′13″W

Geography
- Location: Applecross, Highland, Scotland
- Parent range: Northwest Highlands
- OS grid: NG796417
- Topo map: OS Landranger 24

Sgùrr a' Chaorachain (792 m) is a mountain in the Northwest Highlands, Scotland, on the remote Applecross peninsula in the North of Scotland.

A fine sandstone peak, it lies just above the high Bealach na Bà pass.
