= Margaret Leigh =

English writer

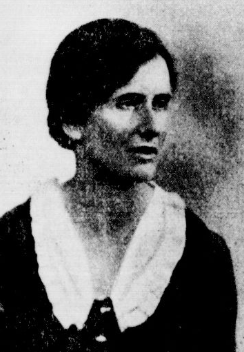
- Born: Margaret Mary Leigh; 17 December 1894; London
- Died: 7 April 1973 (aged 78)
- Occupation: Writer

Margaret Mary Leigh (17 December 1894 – 7 April 1973) was an English writer who lived extensively in Scotland and wrote about life in crofting communities. She was born in London, England, the cousin of novelist Dorothy L. Sayers and the daughter of an Oxford don, and educated at Somerville College, Oxford.

== Early career ==
Leigh spent many of her early years travelling abroad for her father's health. At various times, she acted as a governess, teacher and university lecturer. She eventually supported herself and her mother by subsistence farming, first in Cornwall, and later in Scotland.

== Writing career ==
Leigh published a short book of poetry in 1923, Songs from Tani's Garden, before writing her first novel, The Passing of the Pengwerns, in 1924. Harvest of the Moor recounts her experience farming in Cornwall. In 1939, Leigh rode a horse from Cornwall to Scotland, which became the subject of her third book, A Kingdom for a Horse. She subsequently settled there, living variously at the Isle of Barra, Aultgrishan in Ross-shire, Fernaig in Ross-shire, Smirisary in Moidart and Inverness. Three of her books relate her experience in crofting communities in north-west Scotland before, during and just after World War II.

Her 1949 book Spade Among the Rushes described her experiences at the little croft of Smirisary on the west coast of Scotland. A description noted that "it is the story of a woman struggling alone against a land yielding nothing except hard work".

== Works ==
- Leigh, Margaret (1918). Contribution of 2 poems in Oxford Poetry 1918. B. H. Blackwell, Oxford.
- Leigh, Margaret (1923). Songs from Tani's Garden. Privately printed.
- Leigh, Margaret (1924). The Passing of the Pengwerns. Heinemann Ltd., London.
- Leigh, Margaret (1936). Highland Homespun. Phoenix House, London.
- Leigh, Margaret (1937). Harvest of the Moor. G. Bell and Sons.
- Leigh, Margaret (1938). Love the Destroyer. G. Bell and Sons.
- Leigh, Margaret (1939). My Kingdom for a Horse. MacMillan & Co, London.
- Leigh, Margaret (1939). The Further Shore. Unpublished.
- Leigh, Margaret (1941). Driftwood and Tangle. MacMillan & Co, London.
- Leigh, Margaret (1949). Spade Among the Rushes. Phoenix House, London.
- Leigh, Margaret (1952). The Fruit in the Seed: Chapters of Autobiography. Phoenix House, London.

== Last days ==
In 1948, Margaret Leigh converted to Catholicism and in 1950 entered a convent. She died in Inverness, Scotland in 1973.
