= Achintraid =

Coordinates: 57.38264°N 5.59723°W

Achintraid: Scottish Gaelic: Achadh na Tràghad
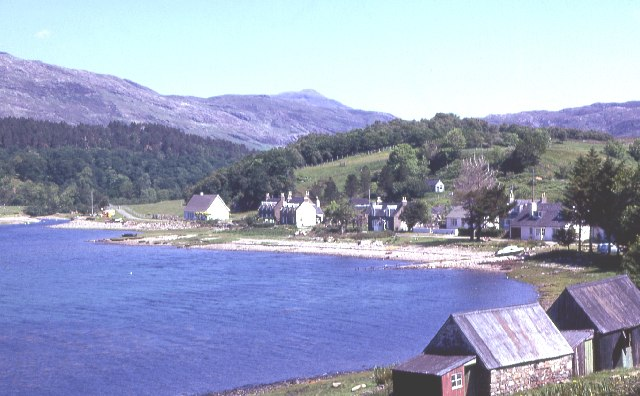
- Achintraid is at the other end of the small bay on Loch Kishorn from Ardarroch.

- Location within the Ross and Cromarty area
- Population: 67,670
- OS grid reference: NG838381
- Council area: Highland
- Country: Scotland
- Sovereign state: United Kingdom
- Post town: Kishorn
- Postcode district: IV54 8XB
- Dialling code: 01520 733
- Police: Scotland
- Fire: Scottish
- Ambulance: Scottish
- UK Parliament: Inverness, Skye and West Ross-shire
- Scottish Parliament: Caithness, Sutherland and Ross

Achintraid (Scottish Gaelic: Achadh na Tràghad) is a small one-time crofting township, situated at the north-eastern end of the sea loch Loch Kishorn, in Strathcarron, Ross-shire, Scottish Highlands and is in the Scottish council area of Highland.

The small hamlet of Ardarroch is located 1/4 mile (400 metres) northwest along the coast road.

== Historical context ==
Achintraid, along with nearby areas like Ardarroch and Sanachan, forms part of the broader Kishorn region. Historically, this area was significant for its involvement in oil platform construction during the 1970s, notably housing a large construction yard that produced the Ninian Central Platform, one of the largest movable objects ever created at that time. However, by the late 1980s, economic downturns led to the closure of these facilities.
