= North Coast 500 =

Scenic route along the north coast of Scotland

Route information
- Length: 516 mi (830 km)

Major junctions
- Tourist loop

Location
- Country: United Kingdom
- Primary destinations: Inverness, Lochcarron, Applecross, Gairloch, Ullapool, Lochinver, Durness, Thurso, John o' Groats, Wick, Helmsdale, Dornoch, Invergordon, Dingwall, Castletown

Road network
- Roads in the United Kingdom; Motorways; A and B road zones

The North Coast 500 is a 516-mile (830 km) scenic route around the north coast of Scotland, starting and ending at Inverness Castle. The route is also known as the NC500 and was launched in 2015, linking many features in the north Highlands of Scotland in one touring route.

The route has increased visitor numbers to parts of the north of Scotland, which has brought economic benefits to some areas. The increase in traffic has led to more instances of bad and dangerous driving, damage to the roads, and concerns about the environmental impact.

== Route ==
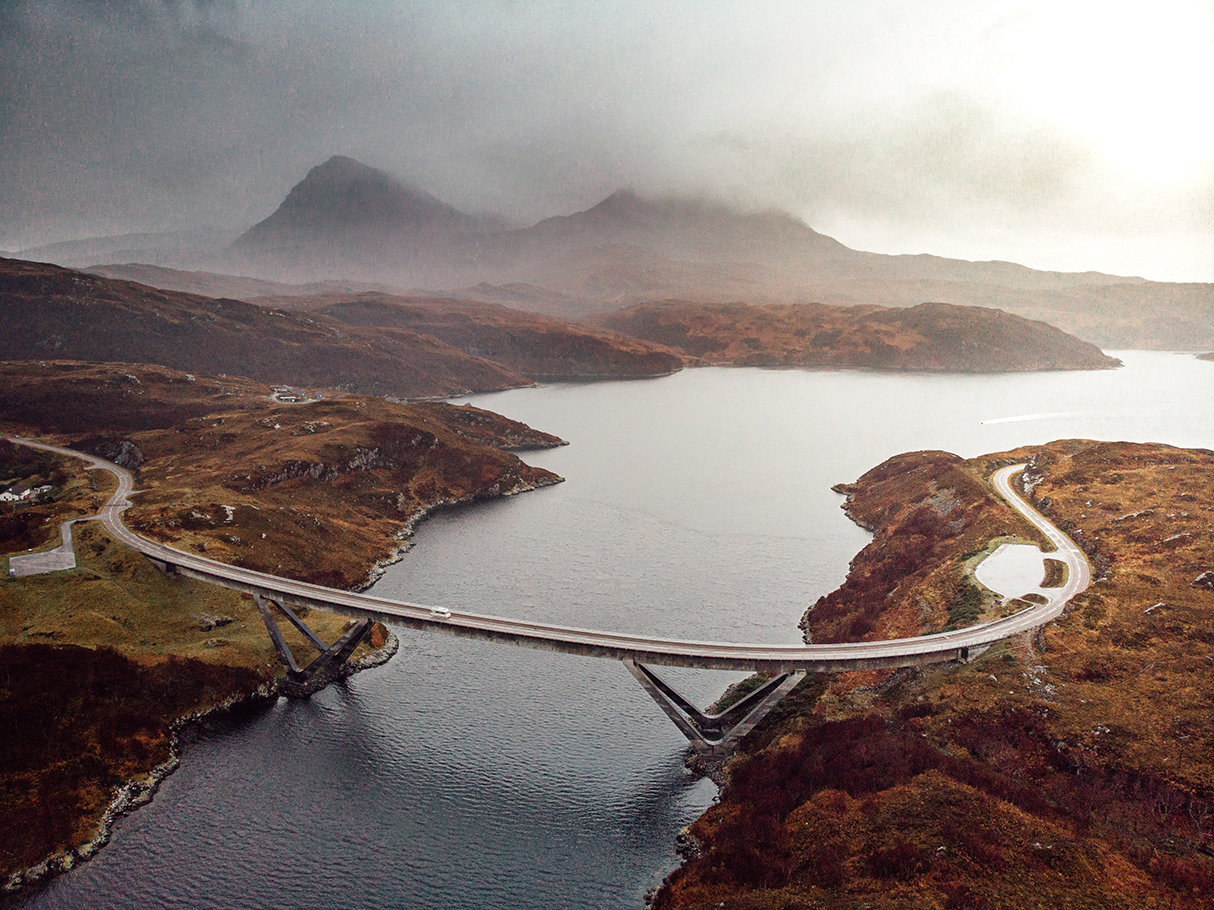
The Kylesku Bridge carrying the A894 across Loch a' Chàirn Bhàin between Lochinver and Durness

The route runs through the traditional counties of Inverness-shire, Ross and Cromarty, Sutherland and Caithness.

Working clockwise, the route starts at Inverness and runs via Muir of Ord, Applecross (including the Bealach na Bà), Gairloch, Ullapool, Scourie, Durness, Castle of Mey, Thurso, John o' Groats, Wick, Dunrobin Castle, Dingwall then back to Muir of Ord and Inverness. The route of the North Coast 500 takes in many areas of the North Highland Way, a walking route along Scotland's north coast.

== History ==
The North Coast 500 was launched in March 2015 by the Tourism Project Board of the North Highland Initiative (NHI), in an attempt to work with all aspects of the tourism sector to bring unified benefits to businesses across the route. It was identified that a gap existed in the market within the North Highlands for a tourism offering that included each county of the area (Caithness, Sutherland & Ross-shire) and that the North Coast 500 would address that. The initiative was supported by VisitScotland and Highlands & Islands Enterprise (HIE).

In 2015, the route was named fifth in the "Top 5 Coastal Routes in the World" listing by Now Travel Magazine. It has been described as "Scotland's Route 66".

The North Coast 500 is also regarded as a challenge for endurance cyclists. In August 2015, Mark Beaumont established the record for the 516-mile route, completing it in 37 hours and 58 minutes. After others improved his time, Beaumont reclaimed the record in September 2022, finishing in 28 hours and 35 minutes.

The record for running the North Coast 500 is 5 days 23 hours 4 minutes and 17 seconds, set by Luke Ivory in July 2021. The first successful attempt at running the North Coast 500 was done by William Sichel, who completed the route in 8 days 19 hours 7 minutes and 7 seconds in April 2019.

== Impact and response ==
A survey commissioned by HIE suggested that the North Coast 500 led to 29,000 more people visiting the area in its first year, who collectively spent £9 million. Much of the economic benefit have gone to the larger towns and villages, rather than the smaller settlements on the route. A Highland councillor commented in 2019 that visitors tended to stay in the area for only one night when using the route, in contrast with stays of several nights before it opened. In 2017, writer and broadcaster Cameron McNeish questioned the promotion of the route, given that the Scottish Government had adopted strong positions on climate change and renewable energy: "Should we really be promoting the idea of people driving petrol and diesel fuelled vehicles for 500 miles around the north of Scotland?"

The increase in traffic caused problems on local roads – on single track stretches drivers not using passing places to allow others to pass, groups driving in convoys, damaged roads, speeding and excessively slow driving blocking others. On four occasions in 2018, tacks had been scattered across the road, although the motive was never established. Some drivers have boasted of completing the route in under 24 hours and some local people have renamed it the Indy 500, after the US car race, because of some drivers' behaviour. Journey times for local people are up to three times longer during the peak driving season than at quieter times. During 2016, the first full year of the route's operation, the number of deaths and serious accidents on the main roads forming the route increased by 45% compared with 2014. In 2021, reports of dirty camping and strained local infrastructure led to suggestions that the route had become a victim of its own success.

The route's popularity led to the launch of a similar but shorter route through the Central Highlands and Perthshire, the Heart 200. Another Scottish circular route has been opened in recent years, the South West Coastal 300 (SWC300), going around Dumfries & Galloway and southern Ayrshire.

In December 2025, NC500 Ltd, the company that promotes the road trip, commissioned an economic and environmental impact analysis of the scheme. The report was published in June 2026 and found that the 516 mile route generated almost £100 million in economic benefit and supported 1,355 jobs over the course of 2025. The report recommended setting up a working group involving public bodies to address a number of challenges including littering and dangerous driving.

== See also ==
- Instagram tourism
