= Camusterrach =

Hamlet in the Scottish Highlands

Coordinates: 57.40938°N 5.8043°W

Camusterrach: Scottish Gaelic: Camas Tearach
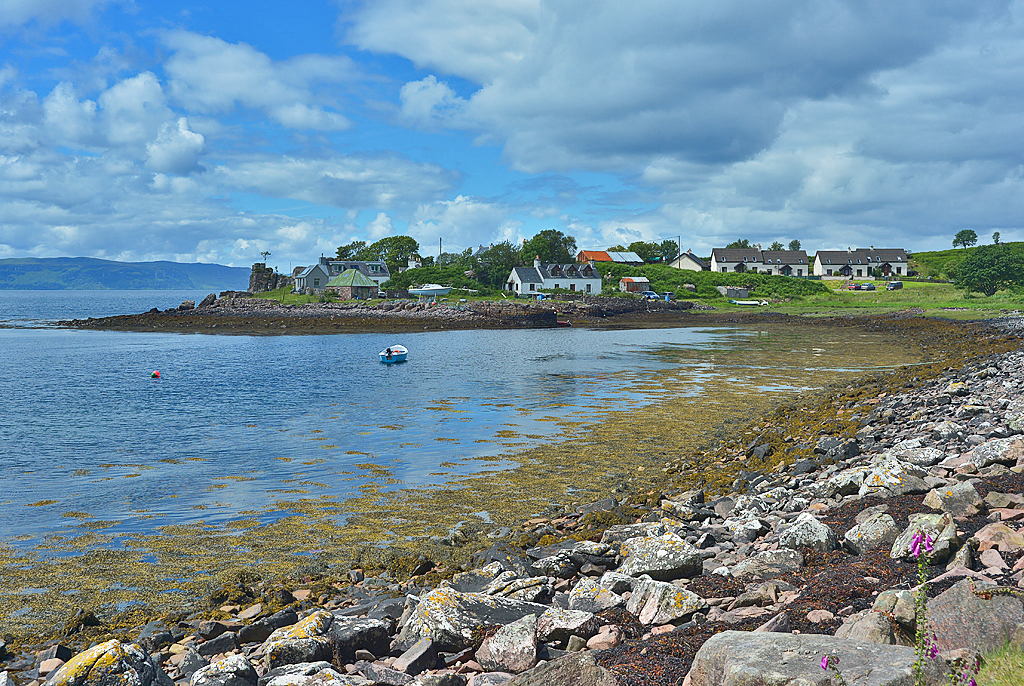
- Camusterrach from the south

- Location within the Ross and Cromarty area
- OS grid reference: NG716418
- Council area: Highland
- Country: Scotland
- Sovereign state: United Kingdom
- Post town: Applecross
- Postcode district: IV54 8
- Police: Scotland
- Fire: Scottish
- Ambulance: Scottish

Camusterrach (Scottish Gaelic: Camas Tearach) is a remote hamlet, situated on the west coast of Scotland, on the Applecross peninsula, in Strathcarron, west Ross-shire, Scottish Highlands and is in the Scottish council area of Highland.
