= Achvarasdal =

Coordinates: 58.55901°N 3.7447°W

Achvarasdal: Scottish Gaelic: Achadh Mharasdail
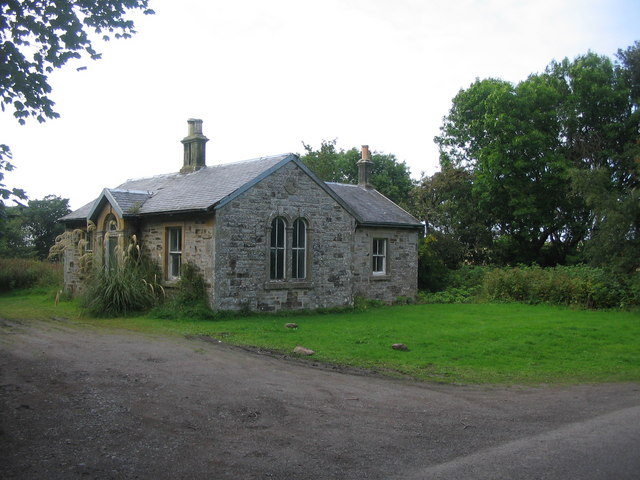

- Location within the Caithness area
- OS grid reference: NC985647
- Council area: Highland
- Country: Scotland
- Sovereign state: United Kingdom
- Postcode district: KW14 7
- Police: Scotland
- Fire: Scottish
- Ambulance: Scottish
- UK Parliament: Caithness, Sutherland and Easter Ross
- Scottish Parliament: Caithness, Sutherland and Ross

Achvarasdal (from the Norse placename meaning "Barr's valley", with the later, post 13th century addition of the Gaelic Ach-/Achadh- meaning "field") is a village in Caithness, Scotland, within the Highland council area. Its Gaelic name is officially Achadh Mharasdail but it is also known in Gaelic as Achadh Bhàrrasdail.

== Geography ==
Achvarasdal lies 1 mile (1.6 km) east of Reay, Thurso, in Caithness, Highland. Immediately to the south flows Achiegullan Burn and the Burn of Isauld. Achvarasdal Burn drains into Sandside Bay to the west. Loch Achbuiligan lies to the north, and the hamlet of Isauld to the northwest.

== Landmarks ==
The area includes a broch in which the lower parts of the wall are preserved, including a chamber and traces of a staircase. The floor of the broch was covered with gravel in 2019 to stop weed growth, but there is still giant hogweed infesting the wallheads and surroundings.

There is a small outcrop of haematite iron at Achvarasdal. Attempts at iron ore mining were made in the early 1870s, and an 1874 map reveals that a windmill was built, probably for pumping. A cairn in the area indicates that it was a burial place of a Celtic maormer or a Norse warrior.

=== Achvarasdal House and Wood ===
Achvarasdal House stands near the broch, in a patch of woodland that is accessible to the public.

The house was once owned by the Pilkington family. The house and vicinity has been excavated and two prostrate stones and a brooch were discovered. A. D. Pilkington of Achvarasdal House was the President of the local Gardener's Society in 1946.

The house was used as a care home until 2018, run by Crossreach (formerly the Church of Scotland Board of Social Responsibility).

The house and grounds are now privately owned as a family residence.

The wood includes 19 native and several foreign tree species, and is home to a variety of lichens, mosses and invertebrates. The wood is accessible by wheelchair.
