= Bealach na Bà =

Road in Wester Ross in the Scottish Highlands

Coordinates: 57°25′58″N 5°45′9″W

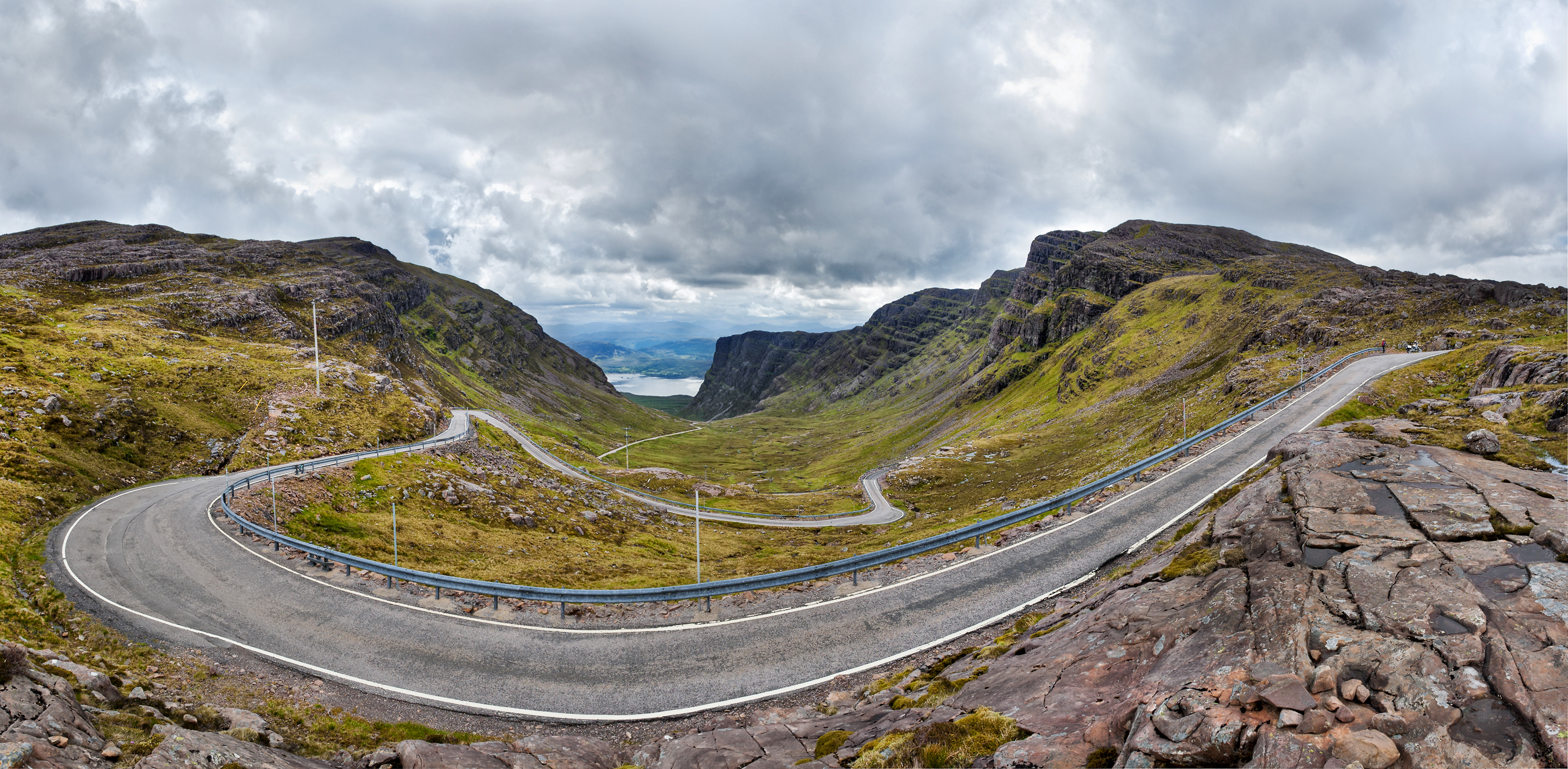
The Bealach na Bà was the only road linking Applecross with the rest of the country until the late 20th century

Bealach na Bà (pronounced [bjal̪ˠəx nə baː]) is a winding pass through the mountains of the Applecross peninsula, in Wester Ross in the Scottish Highlands. It is traversed by a single track road, which passes through several corries. The road links the village of Applecross on the west coast with Loch Kishorn to the east. The eastern end of the road is the junction with the A896 road at Tornapress, north of the village of Kishorn.

The road over the historic mountain pass was built in 1822 and is engineered similarly to roads through the great mountain passes in the Alps, with very tight hairpin bends that switch back and forth up the hillside and gradients that approach 20%. It has the greatest ascent of any road climb in the United Kingdom, rising from sea level at Applecross to 630 m (2,070 ft) in about 6 km (3.7 mi), and is the third highest mountain pass in Scotland.

The name is Scottish Gaelic for Pass of the Cattle, as it was historically used as a drovers' road, driving cattle to markets in Muir of Ord, Falkirk and even as far as London.

The bealach is considered unsuitable for learner drivers and very large vehicles, and the route is often impassable in winter. According to Country Life, "the single-track, historic drovers' lane travels up, down and around hairpins through the mountains of the remote Applecross peninsula as if they were the Alps and, at Bealach na Bà ('pass of the cattle'), features the steepest ascent of any road in the UK".

== History ==
The route existed as a simple track since the Irish monk St Maelrubha founded a monastery at Applecross. Construction of the road started in May 1818, but the first contactor only lasted three months. John Reid & Son from Edinburgh finally completed the construction in September 1822. The road cost around £4000, or about £0.5m in 2020 prices, but the landowner received a 75% government grant to construct it.

At the start of the 20th century, the pass was used for motorsport events, showcasing the capability of early vehicles. The first car was reportedly driven up the pass in 1904 or 1906.

The Bealach na Ba road was unsurfaced rough gravel until the 1950s, making it difficult to clear of snow in the winter, so sometimes for weeks the only transport to Applecross was by Ferry. Between 1956 and 1958 the road was upgraded, with the road levelled and surfaced with tarmac, plus three of the hairpin bends at the top were widened.

In 1975, a second road to Applecross opened, following the coast around the north of the peninsula from Shieldaig via Kenmore.

Today, the route is part of the North Coast 500. In 2025, The Daily Telegraph wrote that Bealach na Bà had become a "worldwide motoring phenomenon".

== In popular culture ==
The road featured in the television series Hamish Macbeth (much of which was filmed in nearby Plockton), which pictures it having a road sign that indicates: "Narrow road - no more than three sheep abreast". The road was also featured in the 1953 film Laxdale Hall.

== Cycling ==
Since 2006 a pair of cyclosportive cycling events has been staged in the surrounding region, and over the pass. The 70 km (43 mi) Bealach Beag event is held each May, and the 144 km (89 mi) Bealach Mòr event is held each September.

== Climate ==
Bealach na Bà has a tundra climate (Köppen ET).

Climate data for Bealach na Bà, Elevation: 773 m (2,536 ft), 1991–2020
Month	Jan	Feb	Mar	Apr	May	Jun	Jul	Aug	Sep	Oct	Nov	Dec	Year
Mean daily maximum °C (°F)	2.0 (35.6)	1.7 (35.1)	2.6 (36.7)	5.1 (41.2)	10.0 (50.0)	11.7 (53.1)	12.9 (55.2)	12.6 (54.7)	9.3 (48.7)	6.6 (43.9)	4.0 (39.2)	2.4 (36.3)	6.8 (44.2)
Daily mean °C (°F)	0.2 (32.4)	−0.1 (31.8)	0.6 (33.1)	2.7 (36.9)	6.2 (43.2)	8.4 (47.1)	9.9 (49.8)	9.8 (49.6)	7.4 (45.3)	4.7 (40.5)	2.2 (36.0)	0.6 (33.1)	4.4 (39.9)
Mean daily minimum °C (°F)	−1.7 (28.9)	−2.0 (28.4)	−1.4 (29.5)	0.3 (32.5)	2.5 (36.5)	5.0 (41.0)	6.9 (44.4)	7.0 (44.6)	5.6 (42.1)	2.9 (37.2)	0.4 (32.7)	−1.2 (29.8)	2.1 (35.8)
Source: Met Office

Climate data for Bealach Na Ba No 2 (773 metres asl) 1981–2010
Month	Jan	Feb	Mar	Apr	May	Jun	Jul	Aug	Sep	Oct	Nov	Dec	Year
Mean daily maximum °C (°F)	1.6 (34.9)	1.2 (34.2)	2.2 (36.0)	3.6 (38.5)	6.9 (44.4)	9.1 (48.4)	10.5 (50.9)	10.5 (50.9)	8.7 (47.7)	6.0 (42.8)	3.5 (38.3)	2.3 (36.1)	5.5 (41.9)
Mean daily minimum °C (°F)	−2.1 (28.2)	−2.4 (27.7)	−1.5 (29.3)	−0.4 (31.3)	2.1 (35.8)	4.7 (40.5)	6.6 (43.9)	6.7 (44.1)	5.1 (41.2)	2.9 (37.2)	0.1 (32.2)	−1.2 (29.8)	1.7 (35.1)
Source: metoffice.gov.uk
