= Sgùrr a' Gharaidh =

Mountain in Scotland

Coordinates: 57.440°N 5.529°W

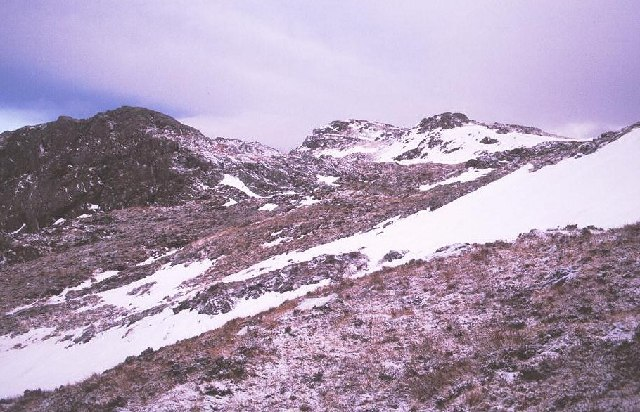
- The rocky summit ridge of Sgùrr a' Gharaidh

Highest point
- Elevation: 732 m (2,402 ft)
- Prominence: 333 m (1,093 ft)
- Listing: Graham, Marilyn

Geography
- Location: Wester Ross, Scotland
- Parent range: Northwest Highlands
- OS grid: NG884444
- Topo map: OS Landranger 24

Sgùrr a' Gharaidh (732 m) is a mountain in the Northwest Highlands of Scotland. It lies in Wester Ross, north of Loch Carron.

The mountain is the highest peak in the northern area around Loch Carron, however its finest feature is its craggy north face. The nearest village is Lochcarron.

This mountain adjoins, is connected to, the Glas Bhelnn mountain, 728m. The Glas Bhelnn then slopes down to the golf course and graveyard with East Church by the A896 which runs long the Loch Carron.

To the east of Sgùrr a' Gharaidh is the bald grey top of An Ruadh-stac 892m and the red top Maol Chean-dearg 933m
