= Lochcarron Old Parish Church =

Church building in Ross and Cromarty, Highland, Scotland

- Lochcarron Old Parish Church
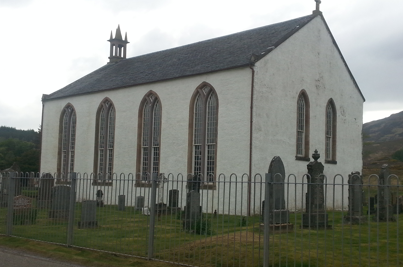
- Lochcarron Old Parish Church (2018)

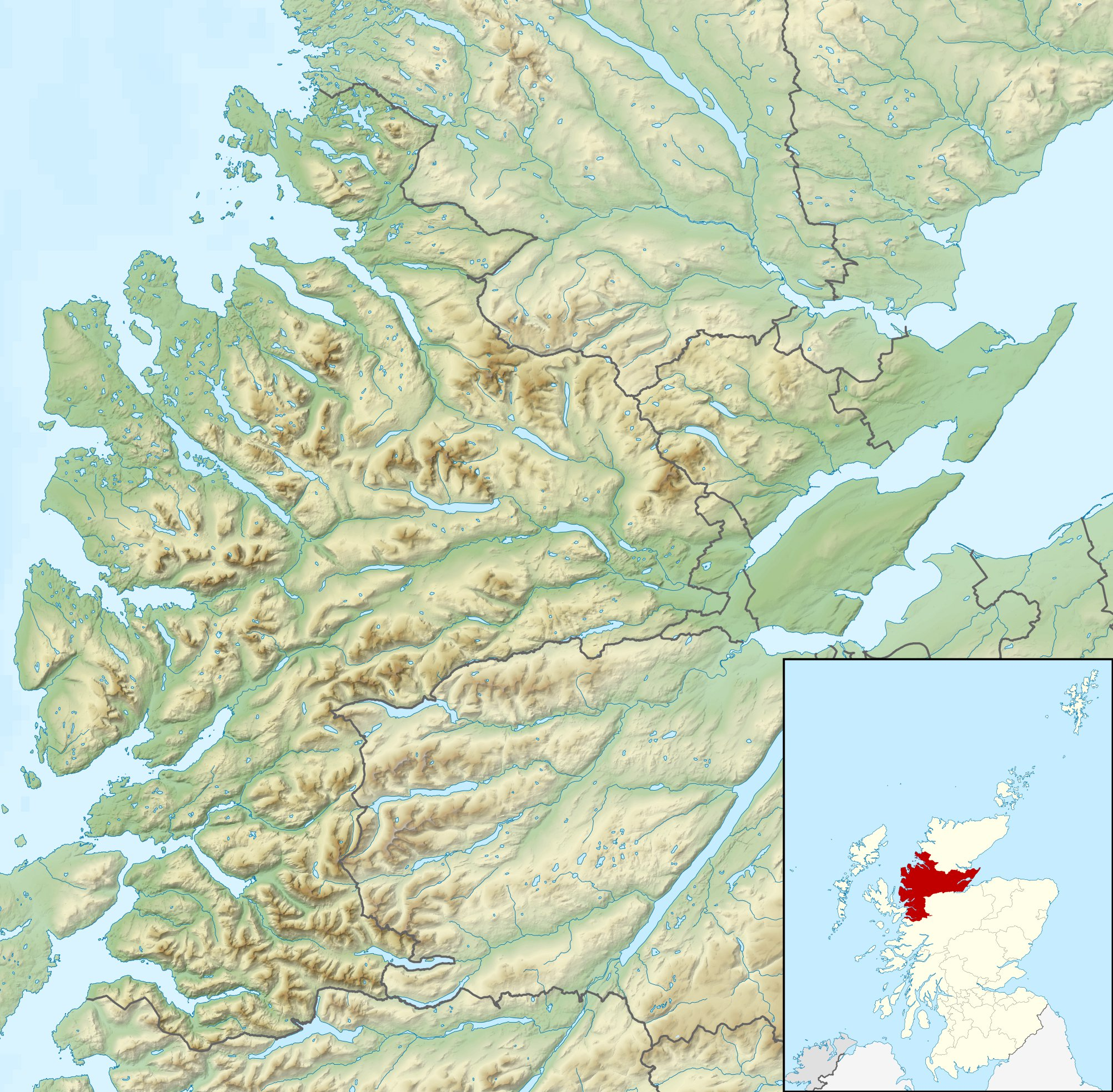
- Location within Ross and Cromarty
- Location: Ross and Cromarty, Scotland
- Coordinates: 57°22′N 5°31′W

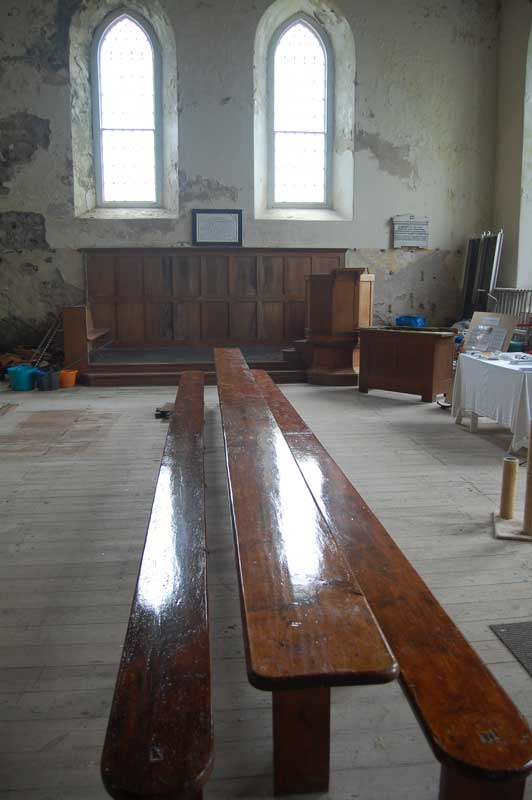
Central communion table (2019)

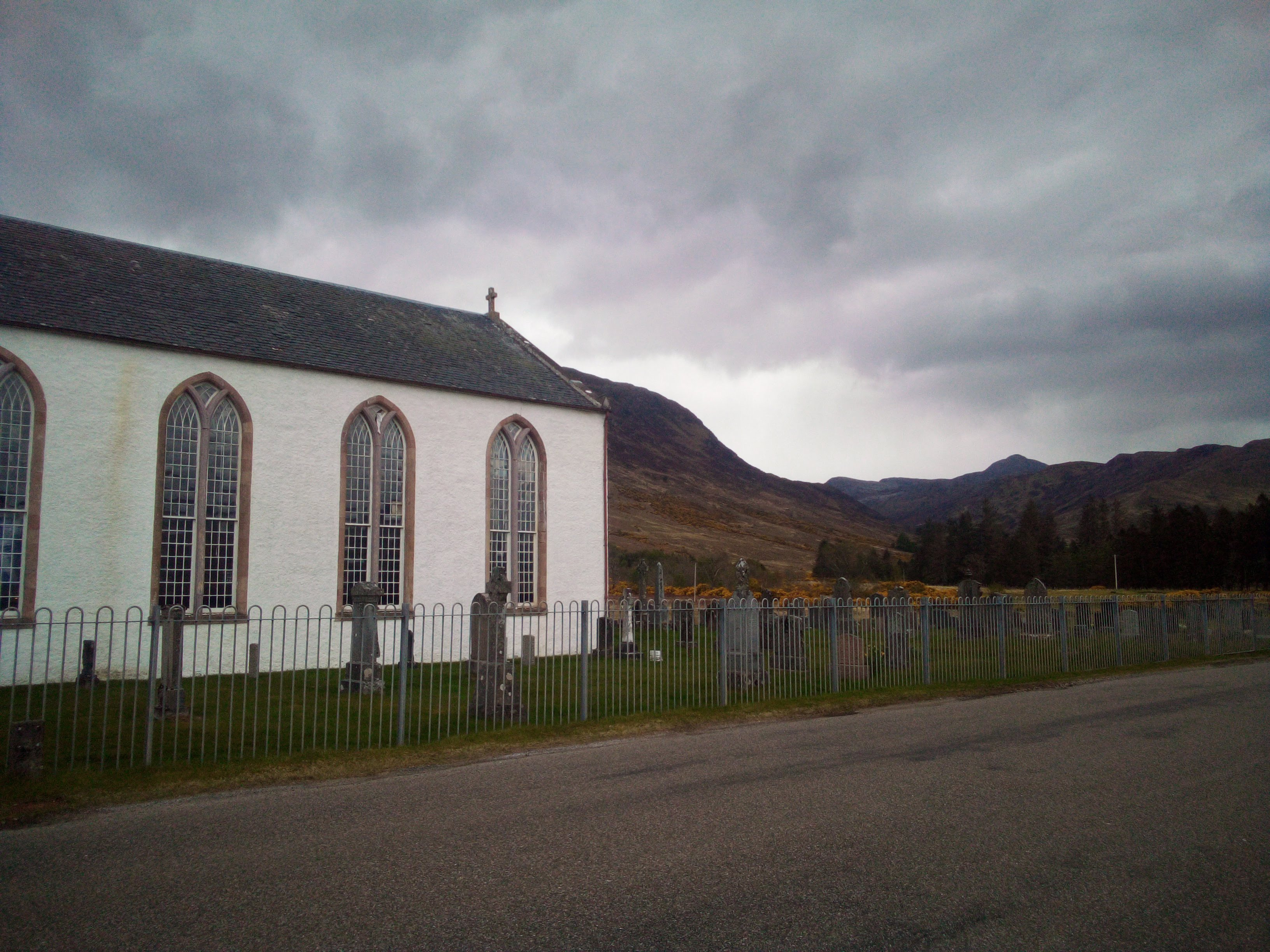
East Kirk with Glas Bheinn behind and the grey bald An Ruadh-stac far right (April 2020)

The now deconsecrated Lochcarron Old Parish Church was completed in 1836. It was Presbyterian, Church of Scotland. Located in Ross-Shire, Scottish Highlands. Originally known as An Eaglais mhòr which means 'big church' but often also known locally as 'East Kirk'. It was built on virgin land of a shingle bank, close to the edge of the salt water Loch Carron.

== Location ==
The building is situated a mile from the village of Lochcarron on the A896, on the North Coast 500 tourist route. The building and graveyard are situated within the Lochcarron Golf Course at the foot of the Glas Bheinn mountain 728m, which is connected to the Sgurr a' Gharaidh mountain 732m. The grey topped An Ruadh-stac 892m, is visible from the graveyard, but not its taller neighbour red topped Maol Chean-dearg 933m. Also clearly visible from the graveyard to the east is Fuar Tholl 907m, with the Wellington's Nose landmark on its summit. These are part of the Torridon mountain group.

The building is not to be confused with the other Old Parish Church of 1751 that is several meters down the road towards the village, and is a ruin. It is also not to be confused with Lochcarron Parish Church, which is the current parish church and located in the village.

== Architecture ==
The grade B listed building is sited in the new Lochcarron Burial Ground, an active graveyard (owned and maintained by the council), which contains the remains of Lauchlan Watt at the east end of the building. There are no graves older than the church, those are sited in the graveyard of the 1751 Old Parish Church. The building has been remodelled inside three times since being built. The original layout was a central high pulpit with galleries either side. Later it was remodelled into two rooms, the galleries were removed and the pulpit remodelled. A large maintenance was undertaken by Alexander Ross (architect) which included adding skews. In the final remodelling a gallery was placed at the opposite end to the pulpit. Under the gallery are two vestry rooms, steps up to the gallery and a passageway to the porch. The entrance porch was an addition during the remodelling. This is a newer front door as the original access was through two doors either side of the pulpit, these were blocked up when two doors in the rear wall were added, one of these was blocked up when the new porch entrance was added. In fact, the blocked entrance door in the west rear wall was turned into a window. At some point the raised wooden floors were added, as before that it was a soil floor with boards over.

Major alterations undertaken include:

- Initial design: one large room, galleries either side, high central pulpit with external doors either side of it. The 700 to 800 person capacity.
- Two rooms, galleries removed, pulpit remodelled, doors near pulpit closed up, doors opened in rear wall at extreme ends.
- Returned to a large room with a gallery installed, with vestry rooms under, at the opposite end to the pulpit. External door opened under gallery. Rear west door sealed.

The building still contains a rare long central communion table (similar to the ones in Ardchattan Kirk near Oban and Howmore#Church in the Outer Hebrides, although the East Kirk table is a continuous table, without a break) and the remodelled pulpit and altar. The wooden floors are intact. It is 26 feet from the floor to the rafters. Though the building looks small from the outside, it is actually very large. In its heyday it was reported to be able to contain 700 to 800 people. In the 1930s it was quoted as, "One of the biggest enclosed spaces in the Highlands."

The four wooden Gothic Y-tracery windows to the front are three and a half meters tall and still original. The windows above the pulpit are also original. There is a very similar, though smaller, church in Applecross. This now has Y-tracery windows, though smaller windows than the East Kirk, which are uPVC; the original windows were not Y-tracery.

While a lot of Highland churches follow a similar oblong box design pattern to the East Kirk, the unusual things about it are: the very large ornate Y-tracery windows and the exceptional size of the building. Other than that, in line with the Presbyterian faith, the interior is now modest. The glass is clear, and not stained glass, in order to 'let in the light of the lord'. The standard design and standard bellcote is featured on all the Thomas Telford 'Parliamentary Kirks', though East Kirk is 6 years too late a build to be among their number it still shares a similar design philosophy.

== History ==
The building is private hands since the Church of Scotland sold it in 2005. Previous to 2005 the building had been used for a long time for only funerals and looked after by the community. Its size counted against it, as the church divided several times after its being built, starting with the division between the Church of Scotland and the Free Church. The large kirk was no longer needed as other churches were built in the village. In addition to East Kirk and the old East Kirk, there are four more churches in Lochcarron, three currently active. The East Kirk was always notoriously hard to heat with 30 inch thick stone walls, and most remember it as a very cold building to be in. Hence, over its later life the building was rather neglected. It was owned by the Church of Scotland but looked after and insured by the community council. It was sold because the cost of insurance became a problem. From 2005 to 2018 it was left mostly untouched after that owner removed the pews, organ and plaster walls. All this was burnt. In 2018 it changed hands again and it now in a process of renovation. The current owners are restoring it to original condition using traditional methods. The roof had "nail sickness" and was completed within four years. The building is officially a dwelling.
