= Lauchlan Watt =

Scottish minister

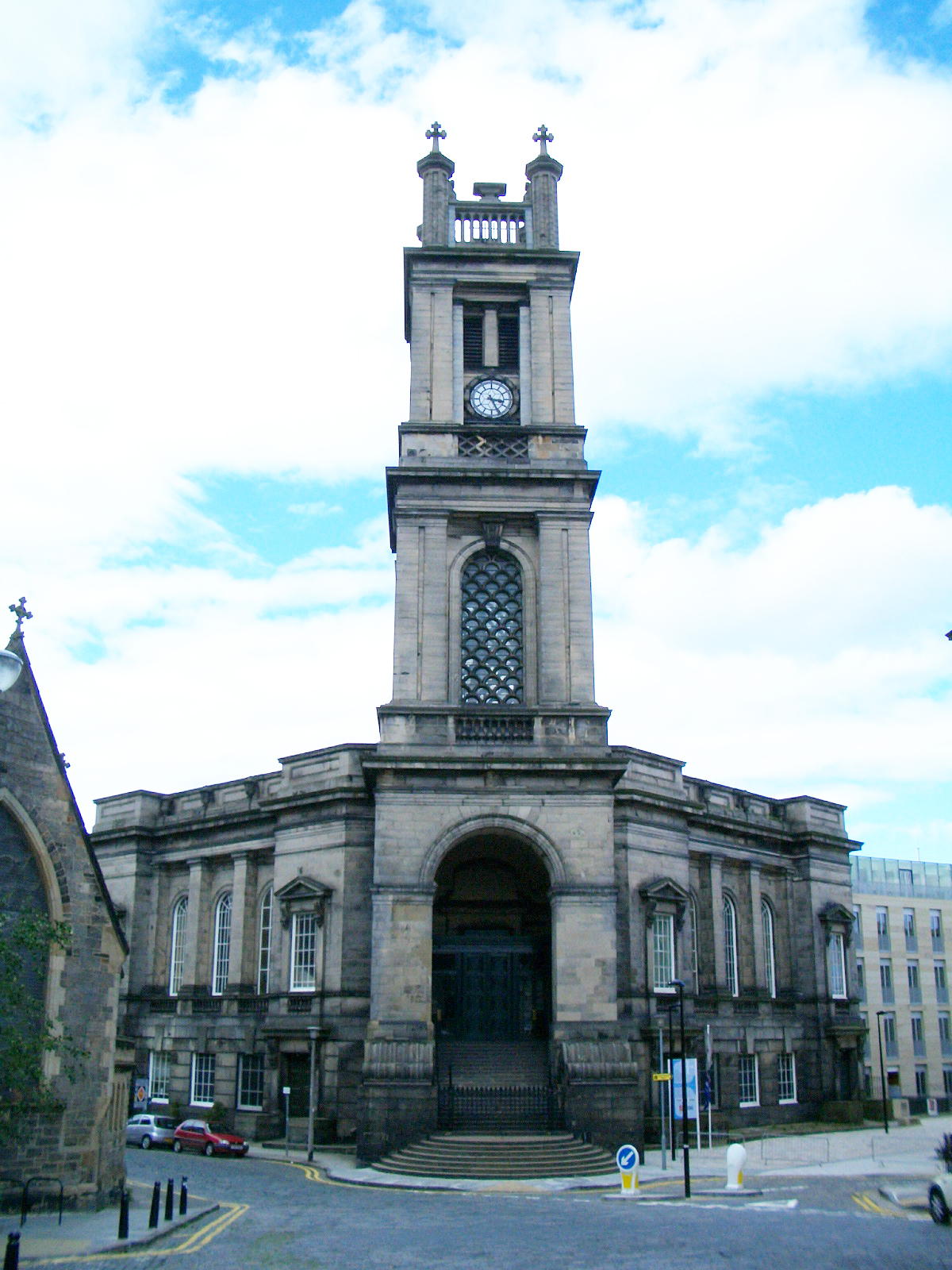
St Stephen's in Edinburgh

Lauchlan MacLean Watt FRSE (24 October 1867 – 11 September 1957) was the minister of Glasgow Cathedral from 1923–34, and the Moderator of the General Assembly of the Church of Scotland in 1933. He was a published poet and author, and a literary critic.

== Life ==
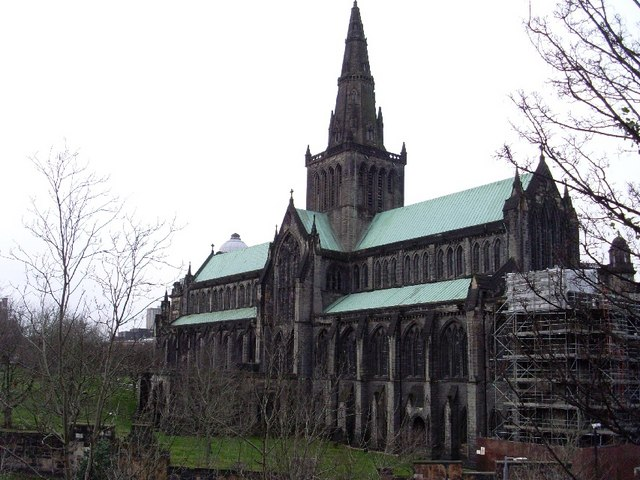
Glasgow Cathedral

Maclean Watt was born on 24 October 1867 at Grantown-on-Spey, Morayshire, the only son of Margaret Gillanders MacLean from Skye, and her husband Andrew MacLean Watt.

He studied for a general degree at University of Edinburgh graduating with an MA in 1894. He then went on to study divinity, graduating with a BD in 1897.

He was ordained as minister of Turriff in 1897. In 1901 he was translated to the joint parishes of Alloa and Tullibody. In 1911 he moved to the prestigious St Stephen's Church, Edinburgh. Soon after arrival he was elected a Fellow of the Royal Society of Edinburgh. His proposers were Rev Thomas Burns, Norman Macleod, George Chrystal and Arthur Pillans Laurie.

In 1907 he accompanied the King of Denmark to Iceland as a correspondent for The Times, The Scotsman and The Manchester Guardian. During the World War I he was a chaplain with the Gordon Highlanders in the 7th Division. He was sent by the Government as Commissioner to the US and Canada in 1918 to clarify UK war aims.

In 1923 he moved to High Kirk of Glasgow, better known as Glasgow Cathedral (1923–34).

He was Turnbull Trust preacher at The Scots' Church in Melbourne in 1932. The University of Glasgow awarded him an honorary doctorate (LLD) in 1933 for his publications.

In 1933 he was elected Moderator of the General Assembly of the Church of Scotland, in succession to Very Rev Hugh ross Mackintosh, the highest position in his church. On completion of this duty in the summer of 1934 he retired aged 67. He was succeeded as Moderator by Rev Peter Donald Thomson.

He died at Lochcarron on 11 September 1957 and is buried in the Lochcarron Burial Ground at the east end of the Lochcarron Old Parish Church.

== Publications ==
He was a prolific author in prose and verse, on folk-lore, history and antiquities, especially Celtic and Gaelic as well as aspects of religion, literature and the life of a soldier, and gave the Warrack Lectures and McNeil-Frazer Lectures on preaching in 1930.

A number of his poems and books are war-related.

- I Bind My Heart this Tide (hymn - 1907)
- The Tryst: A Book of the Soul (1907)
- Scottish Life and Poetry (1912)
- In the Land of War (1915)
- The Soldier's Friend (1916)
- The Heart of a Soldier (1918)
- The Gordon Highlanders (1918)
- While the Candle Burns (1933)
- Scottish Ballads and Ballad Writing
- The Cameron Highlanders
- The Hills of Home (this appears to be the basis of the song "A Scottish Soldier")
- The Book of the Beloved
- The Advocate's Wig
- Edragil 1745
- By Still Waters
- Thomas Carlyle
- The Preacher's Life and Work
- Douglas's Aeneid

== Family ==
In June 1897 he married Jenny (or Jeannie) Hall Reid. They had one son, Hector MacLean Watt (b.1900).

== Links ==
A video of his grave in Lochcarron: https://youtube.com/shorts/tK1PGXCYKrc?si=ijoq6M14sHtX9_ji
