= Sgorr Ruadh =

Mountain in Scotland

Coordinates: 57.49859°N 5.40786°W

- An Sgùrr Ruadh
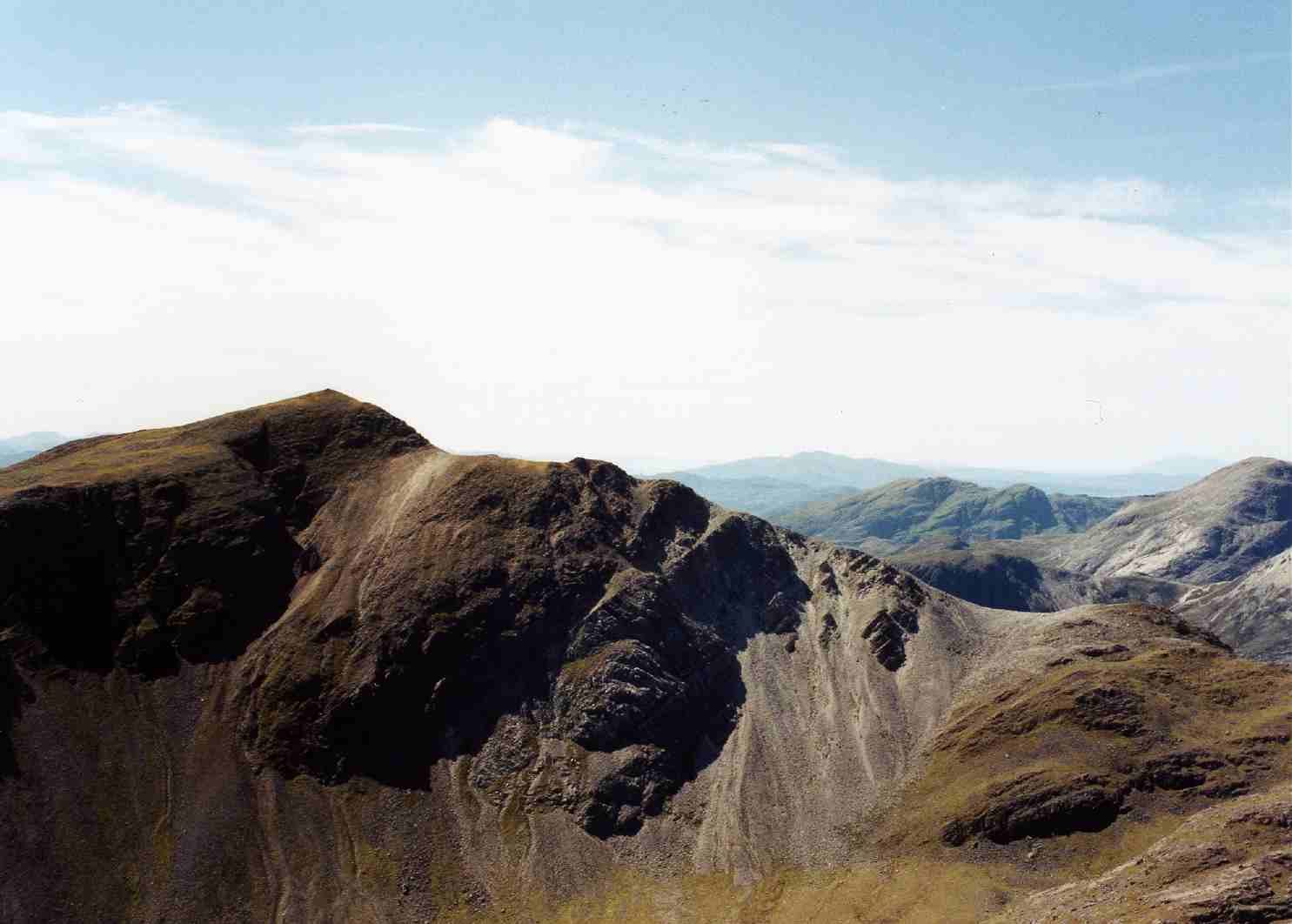
- Sgorr Ruadh seen from Beinn Liath Mhòr

Highest point
- Elevation: 962 m (3,156 ft)
- Prominence: 727 m (2,385 ft)
- Parent peak: Sgurr Mor
- Listing: Munro, Marilyn

Naming
- English translation: the red peak
- Language of name: Gaelic
- Pronunciation: Scottish Gaelic: [ˈs̪kuːrˠ ˈrˠuəɣ]

Geography
- Location: Wester Ross, Scotland
- Parent range: Northwest Highlands
- OS grid: NG959505
- Topo map: OS Landranger 25

Sgorr Ruadh (Scottish Gaelic: An Sgùrr Ruadh) is a mountain between Strath Carron and Glen Torridon in Wester Ross in the Northwest Highlands of Scotland. It is located in Coire Lair near Achnashellach along with two other mountains, Beinn Liath Mhòr and Fuar Tholl, and is often climbed together with one or both of these other mountains.

== Geography ==
Sgurr Ruadh is an attractive peak with Munro status which reaches a height of 962 metres (3156 feet), it is made up of red sandstone (hence its translated name of Red Peak) and shows many of the characteristics of the Torridon Hills to the west, in that it has steep terraced buttresses and considerable scree slopes. The north west face has precipitous cliffs which should be avoided by walkers, although these crags attract rock climbers with around 20 recognised traditional and winter climbs. The centre of the crag is split by a large couloir (gully). There are plenty of easier routes on the crag.

== Ascents and summit ==
Direct ascents of Sgorr Ruadh are usually started from Achnashellach in Glen Carron, although it is possible to approach from Glen Torridon on a considerably longer and rougher route. From Achnnashellach the right of way which goes up Coire Lair to Torridon is taken for two kilometres where a cairn indicates a path bearing left which crosses the River Lair (the river often requires wading) and climbs to the top of the Bhealaich Mhoir, the pass between Sgorr Ruadh and Fuar Tholl. From the top of the bhealaich it is a 275-metre climb to the summit by-passing the many buttresses and gullies on the way.

The summit cairn stands in a spectacular position on the edge of sheer slopes and gives spectacular all round views. The two nearby Munros of Beinn Liath Mhòr and Maol Chean-dearg are well seen as are the Torridon mountains to the west. Many walkers will continue to the adjoining Munro of Beinn Liath Mhòr after climbing Sgorr Ruadh, this is not a straightforward walk as there are areas of crags and high rock steps at the foot of the pass between the two mountains.
