= Beinn Liath Mhòr =

Mountain in Highland, Scotland

Coordinates: 57.512083°N 5.400618°W

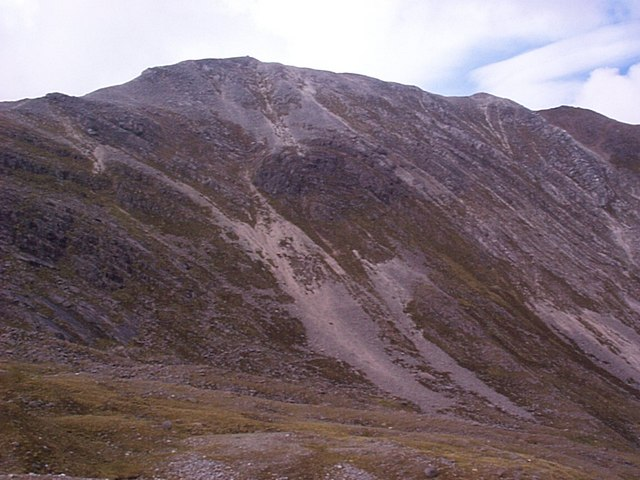
- Beinn Liath Mhor

Highest point
- Elevation: 926 m (3,038 ft)
- Prominence: c. 261 m
- Listing: Munro, Marilyn

Naming
- English translation: Big grey hill
- Language of name: Gaelic
- Pronunciation: Scottish Gaelic: [peɲ ˈliə ˈvoːɾ]

Geography
- Location: Wester Ross, Scotland
- Parent range: Northwest Highlands
- OS grid: NG964519
- Topo map: OS Landranger 25

Beinn Liath Mhòr is a Scottish mountain situated in the mountainous area between Strath Carron and Glen Torridon in Wester Ross in the Highland region. Geologically Beinn Liath Mhòr is made up of Cambrian quartzite scree and Torridonian sandstones giving the mountain a distinctive colour contrast of light and dark. The mountain's other main characteristic is its two-kilometre-long undulating summit ridge which does not drop below 800 metres for its entire length. This culminates at the summit at its far western end at a height of 926 metres (3038 feet) making Beinn Liath Mhòr the 258th highest Munro.

== Ascent ==
The most common approach to Beinn Liath Mhòr starts at Achnashellach on the A890 road and goes by the right of way to Glen Torridon. This follows the impressive Coire Lair, a rugged corrie surrounded by three imposing mountains, the other two being Sgorr Ruadh (which is also a Munro) and Fuar Tholl which is ranked as one of the finest Corbetts by mountain writers. The Coire Lair path is followed for two kilometres until the path forks, here the right hand fork is taken across moorland for 0.5 kilometre until reaching the steep climb of Beinn Liath Mhòr’s south east ridge, which leads directly to the summit plateau. The summit ridge consists of light coloured quartzite stones, whilst the highest point at the far end is crowned by a quartzite cairn. It is also possible to climb Beinn Liath Mhòr from Glen Torridon starting at the car park at grid reference NG957568 and following the Ling path to its termination and then ascending the mountain by its western ridge.

The prospect from the summit gives splendid views of the Torridon mountains to the west including a unique side on view of Liathach and its pinnacles, there are many small lochans well seen below the mountain, as is Upper Loch Torridon. Many walkers will continue from Beinn Liath Mhòr to take in the accompanying Munro of Sgorr Ruadh and strong walkers will also take in Fuar Tholl giving a top class high level walk around Coire Lair.
