= Maol Cheann-dearg =

Mountain in Scotland

Coordinates: 57.49162°N 5.46564°W

Maol Cheann-Dearg
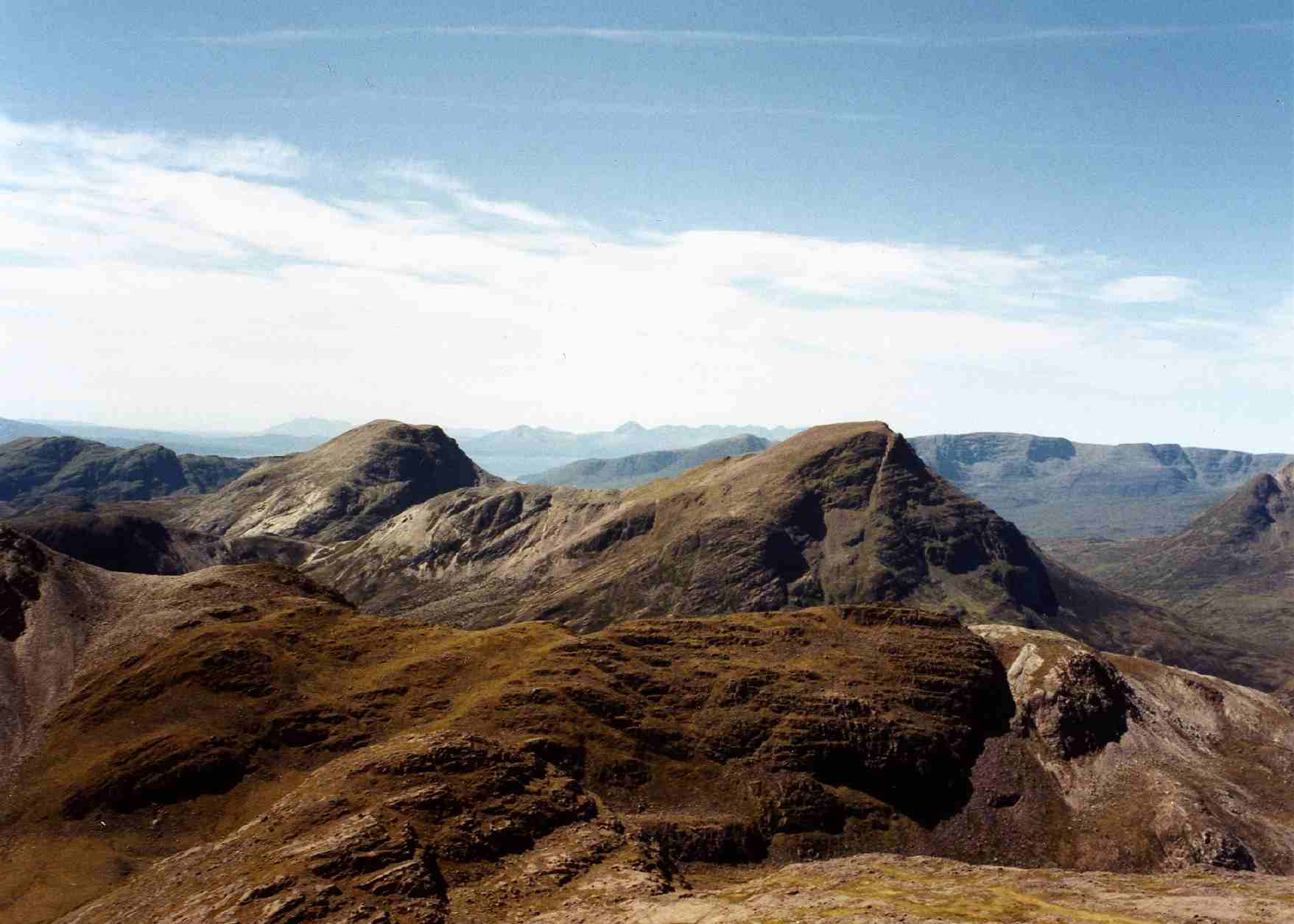
- Maol Cheann-dearg (right) and An Ruadh-stac (left) from Beinn Liath Mhòr with Beinn Bhàn and the Skye Cuillin in the background .

Highest point
- Elevation: 933 m (3,061 ft)
- Prominence: c. 375 m
- Listing: Munro, Marilyn

Naming
- English translation: red-headed brow
- Language of name: Gaelic
- Pronunciation: Scottish Gaelic: [ˈmɯːl̪ˠçan̪ˠ ˈtʲɛɾɛk]

Geography
- Location: Wester Ross, Scotland
- Parent range: Northwest Highlands
- OS grid: NG924499
- Topo map: OS Landranger 25

Maol Cheann-Dearg is a mountain in the Northwest Highlands of Scotland, between Upper Loch Torridon and Loch Carron, in the Coulags deer forest in Wester Ross. It is one of three Munros in this area (the others being Sgorr Ruadh and Beinn Liath Mhòr) and reaches a height of 933 metres (3,060 feet), it is slightly isolated from the other two being separated by a low col of 420 metres and therefore tends to be ascended separately. The mountain is typical of the region in that geologically it is made up of a mixture of sandstone and quartzite, it has a steep flanks and is rock-strewn. The dome shaped summit is littered with red sandstone boulders and lacking in vegetation making its translated name of "red-headed brow" especially appropriate. The mountain is not to be confused with Maol Chinn-dearg, another Munro on the south Glen Shiel ridge.

== Ascent ==
Maol Cheann-dearg is one of the few Scottish hills which is encircled by good stalkers paths, being located on the Beinn Damh deer estate, these paths can be utilised to do an attractive circuit of the mountain to examine the sandstone cliffs and the picturesque lochs of Loch an Eion, Loch Coire an Ruadh-staic and Loch Coire Fionnaraich which surround the mountain and are frequented by some interesting wild birds. For strong walkers the mountain can be ascended with the neighbouring Corbett of An Ruadh-stac (892 metres) which lies two kilometres to the south.

Although it is possible to start from Annat at the head of Upper Loch Torridon, Maol Cheann-dearg is usually ascended from Coulags on the A890 road in Glen Carron where it is possible to park in a disused gravel pit. The valley of the Fionn-amhainn is followed northerly passing the MBA bothy at Coire Fionnaraich, a fine shelter with a lone ash tree outside the front door. 500 metres further on a curious upstanding stone is encountered, this is the Clach nan Con-fionn (The Stone of Fingal’s Dog) where the legendary Fionn mac Cumhaill reputedly tethered his hounds while hunting. Another 500 metres further on a path leaves the valley and goes west to the top of the Bealach a' Choire Ghairbh from where the south east ridge can be followed over broken quartzite and awkward boulders to reach the summit. The summit has a very large cairn and has one of the best views from any Munro with the Torridon Hills well seen to the west along with Beinn Bhàn and the Skye Cuillin to the south west.

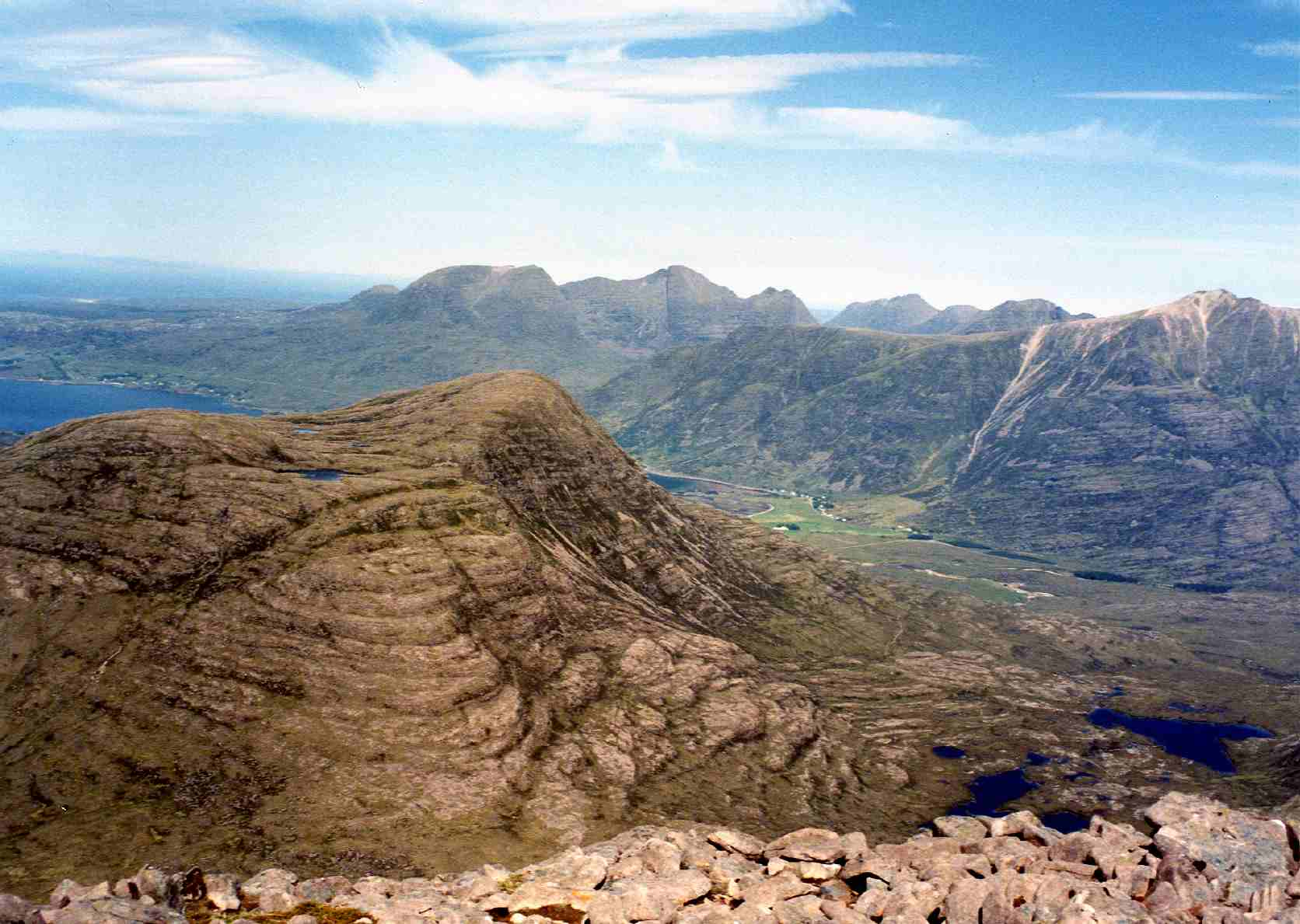
Looking north west from the summit over Beinn na h-Eaglaise to the Torridon mountains.
