= An Ruadh-stac =

Mountain in Scotland

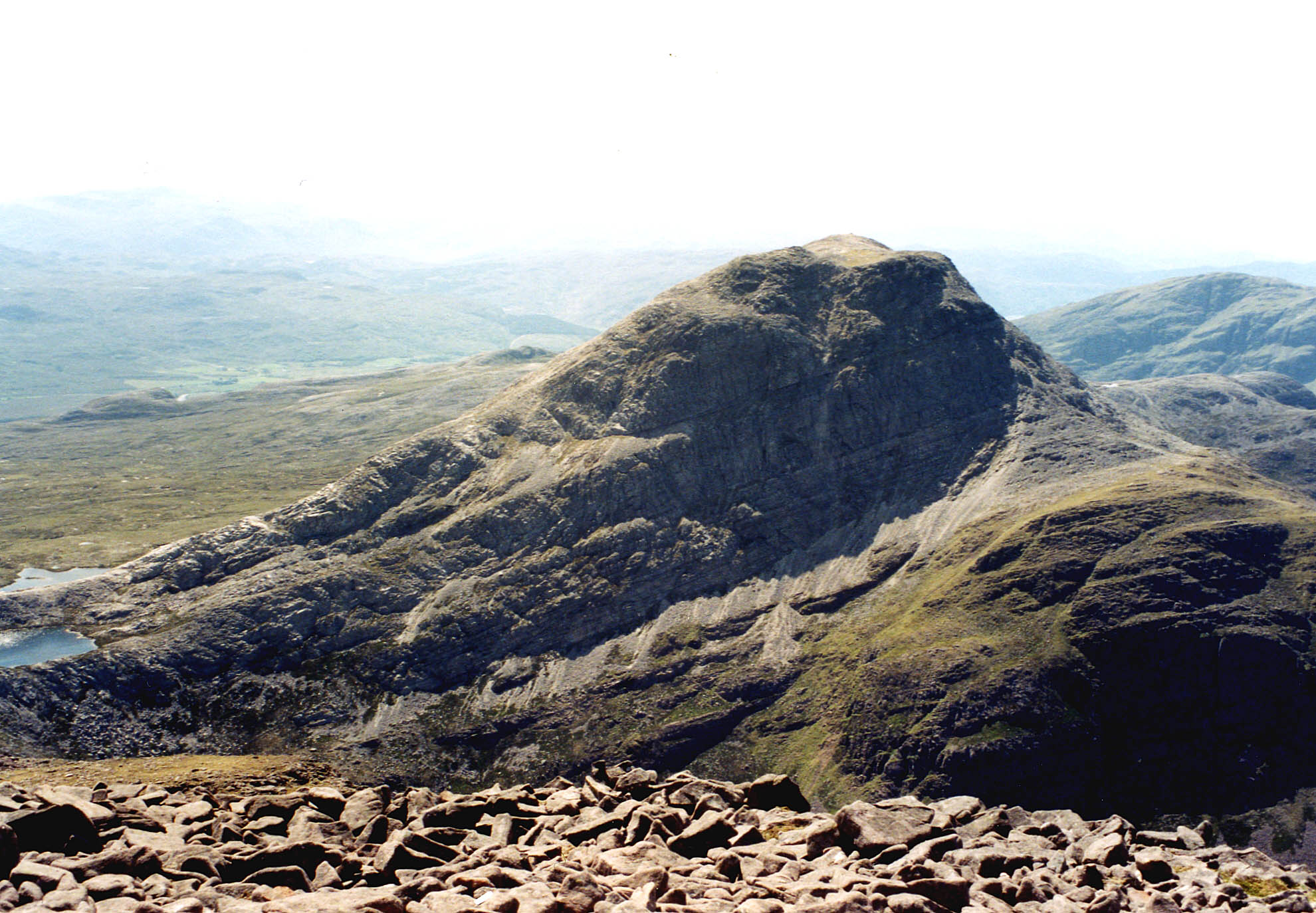
- The north face of An Ruadh-stac seen from Maol Cheann-dearg.

Highest point
- Elevation: 890 m (2,920 ft)
- Prominence: 327 m (1,073 ft)
- Listing: Corbett, Marilyn
- Coordinates: 57°28′33″N 5°28′04″W

Naming
- English translation: Red Stack /Red Conical Hill
- Language of name: Gaelic
- Pronunciation: Scottish Gaelic: [ən̪ˠ ˈrˠuəɣst̪axk]

Geography
- Location within Scotland
- Location: Wester Ross, Scotland
- Parent range: Northwest Highlands
- OS grid: NG921480
- Topo map: OS Landranger 24, OS Explorer 428

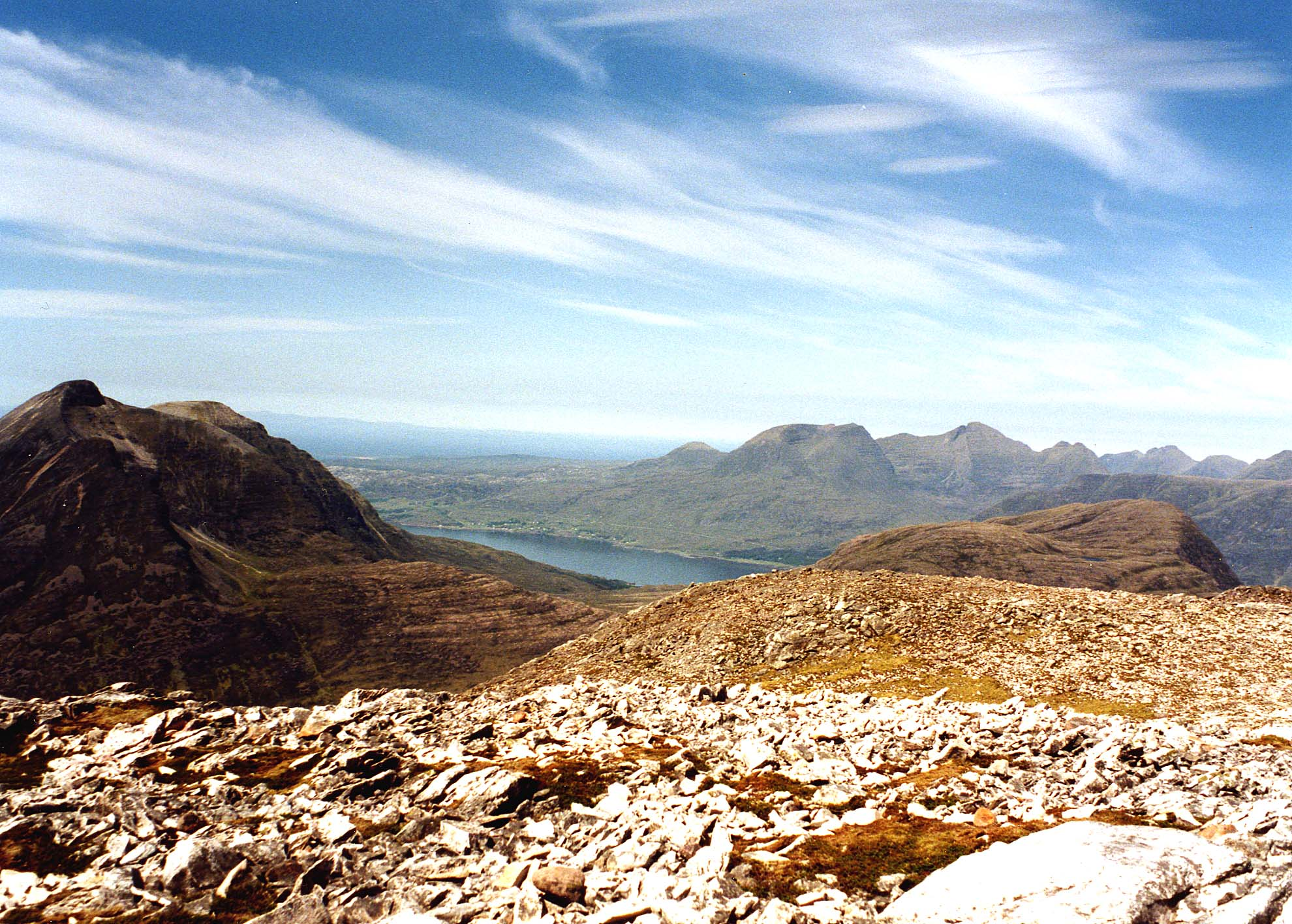
The view NW from the summit takes in Beinn Damh, Upper Loch Torridon and Beinn Alligin.

An Ruadh-stac is a Scottish mountain situated in the Wester Ross region of the Highland council area. It is located 26 km north east of Kyle of Lochalsh.

== Overview ==
An Ruadh-stac reaches a height of 890 metres (2926 feet) making it the 30th highest Corbett, it also qualifies as a Marilyn. It is a distinguished looking mountain which is prominent in views because of its light grey coloured quartzite rocks, it stands in the ancient Coulin hunting forest, an area of rough mountainous country between Glen Carron and Glen Torridon. The mountain is situated four km from the nearest public road but there are good stalkers paths within the deer forest which aid access to the foot of the mountain. An Ruadh-stac is closely associated with the adjoining Munro of Maol Cheann-dearg with which it is often climbed.

The mountain's Gaelic name translates as the Red Stack or Red Conical Hill; this is slightly confusing and misleading, as it is invariably seen as a light-grey hill due to its quartzite rocks. Hamish Brown comments on the name thus: “An Ruadh-stac is a grey hill, sometimes touched white by the sun but never red like its ruddy, bald headed neighbour (Maol Cheann-dearg).”

== Geography ==
An Ruadh-stac has the classic triangular mountain shape formed by three steep ridges; the NE ridge is the least steep and the one usually used for ascent and descent by walkers. This ridge drops to the 600-metre-high (2,000 ft) Bealach a’ Choire Ghairbh, which links the mountain to Maol Cheann-dearg, which stands 2 km to the north across Coire an Ruidh Staic. The south ridge leads over the subsidiary top of Ruadh Stac Beag (758 metres) before descending towards Glen Carron over rough, boggy ground. The north and west side of the mountain are ringed by steep crags, making the NW ridge out of bounds for walkers.

The mountain's finest geographical feature is the north face, a precipitous rock wall which shows off the mountain's layered geology when viewed from a distance. These crags rise over 400 metres from the shore of Loch Coire an Ruaidh-staic and have received the attention of rock climbers, with Tom Patey and Chris Bonington pioneering a 180-metre-long (590 ft) route in 1960.

The lower slopes on the SE side of the mountain are composed of ice-polished slabs dotted with long flowing mounds of debris; this is fluted moraine, deposited from a glacier. The mounds are less than four metres in height but up to 400 metres in length. The mountain's visual attraction is further added to by the presence of four small lochs around its NE flanks; they are all on different levels. One of these lochs, Loch a’ Mhadaidh Ruadh, is rated as one of the most beautiful in the Scottish Highlands, it is located on the Bealach a’ Choire Ghairbh and is enclosed by walls of quartzite rock, giving it an almost artificial look. All drainage from the mountain makes the short journey to the west coast of Scotland, either going directly west to Upper Loch Torridon or SE to Glen Carron and then Loch Carron.

== Ascents and view ==
The summit of An Ruadh-stac is a long way from any road, but the closest starting point is on the A890 road at Coulags in Glen Carron at grid reference NG958451. This route follows the footpath north up the valley of the Fionn-abhainn before crossing the river and going west and climbing up to the Bealach a’ Choire Ghairbh. From the bealach it is a tough 340-metre climb up rough slopes of scree and slabby rock to the summit. It is possible to climb the mountain by a longer route from Glen Torridon starting from Annat at NG893544.

The summit is littered with quartzite boulders, with the highest point marked by a cairn of rocks and gives a view which includes the Skye Cuillin to the SW, Upper Loch Torridon appears next to Beinn Damh to the NW while the Torridon hills are further round to the north. By exploring the summit plateau further it is possible to look 1000 feet down the cliffs of the north face to Loch Coire an Ruaidh-staic.
