= Fuar Tholl =

Coordinates: 57.48496°N 5.37989°W

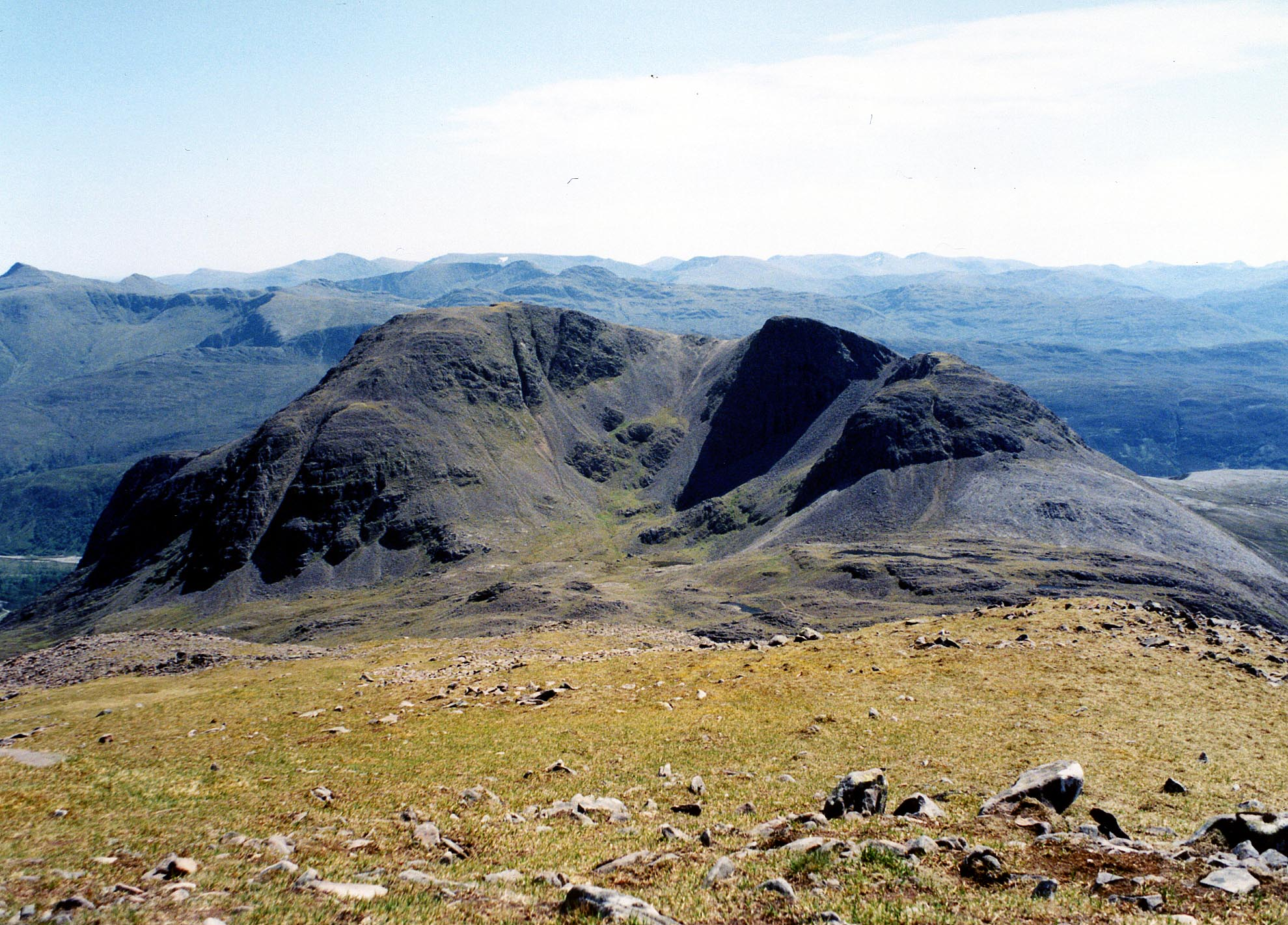
- Fuar Tholl, seen from the adjoining Munro of Sgorr Ruadh. 2 km to the NW.

Highest point
- Elevation: 907 m (2,976 ft)
- Prominence: c. 237 m
- Listing: Marilyn, Corbett

Naming
- English translation: Cold hollow
- Language of name: Gaelic
- Pronunciation: Scottish Gaelic: [ˈfuəɾ ˈhɔul̪ˠ]

Geography
- Location: Wester Ross, Scotland
- Parent range: Northwest Highlands
- OS grid: NG975489
- Topo map: Ordnance Survey Landranger 25

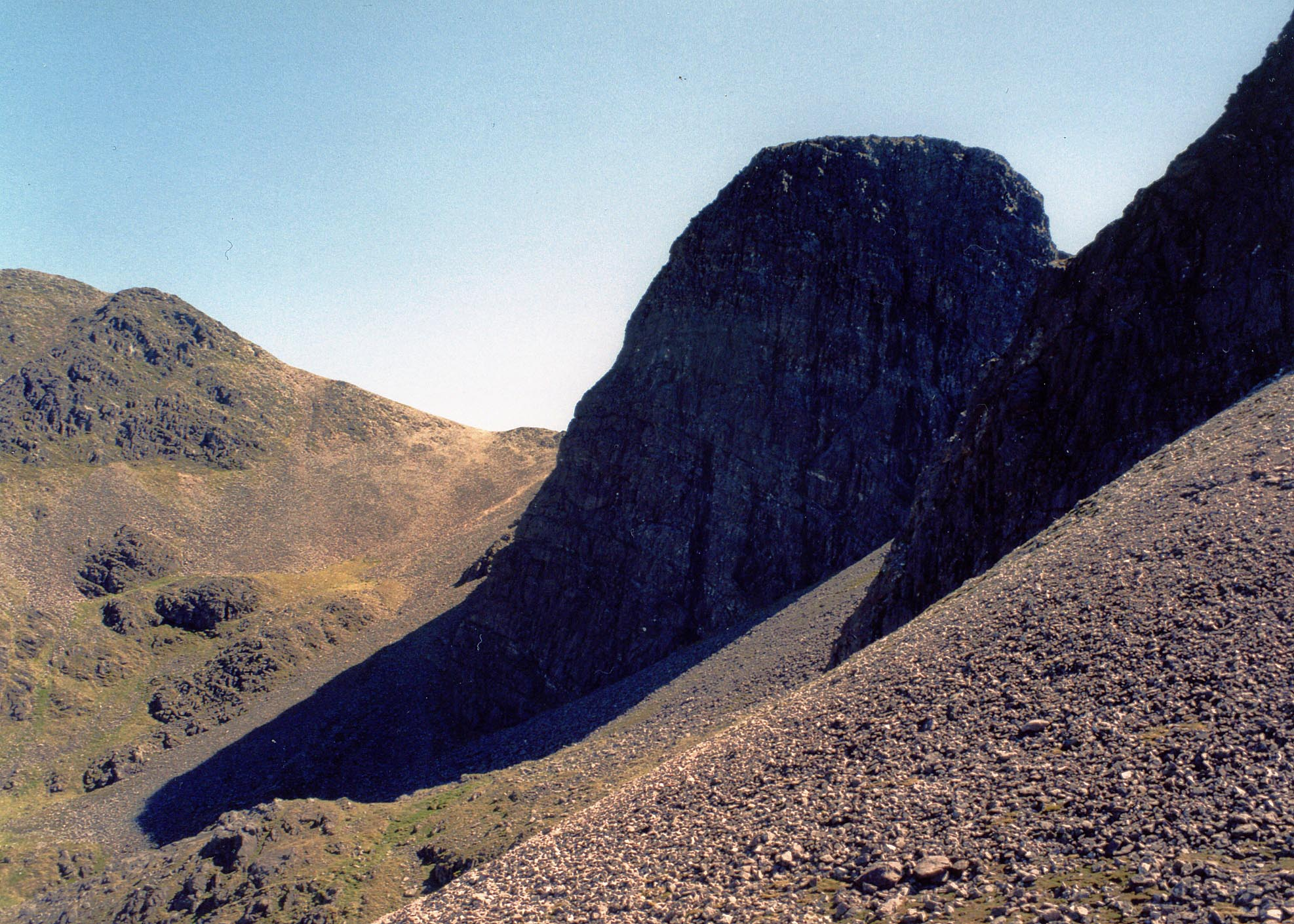
The Mainreachan Buttress within Coire Mainnrichean.

Fuar Tholl is a mountain in the highlands of Scotland. The mountain is situated in the Coulin deer forest 21 km SW of Achnasheen in the Wester Ross region of the Highland council area.

== Overview ==
Fuar Tholl has a rocky summit, and has acquired the nickname Wellington's Nose because the summit ridge is similar in profile to an upturned face which bears a supposed likeness to Arthur Wellesley, 1st Duke of Wellington. The considerable nose on the face is provided the tip of the Mainreachan Buttress which can just be seen over the outline of the main summit. Fuar Tholl reaches a height of 907 metres (2976 feet) making it the 13th highest Corbett. It fails to reach Munro status by just seven metres, but despite this it is regarded by many as the finest of the mountains in the Glen Carron area. The mountain’s name translates from the Gaelic language as “Cold Hole”, it was probably named by ancient settlers in Glen Carron and refers to the deep eastern corrie which is shaded from sunlight and faces that glen.

== Geography ==
Fuar Tholl’s best feature is the rough stone filled Coire Mainnrichean on the western side of the mountain, which has the spectacular 500 foot high cliffs of the Mainreachan Buttress within it. The buttress is one of the finest ice climbing venues in Scotland with Andy Nisbet having pioneered many of the routes. The one kilometre long summit ridge has three high points, the 907 metre main top is marked by a trig point and is situated at the eastern end of the ridge above the eastern corrie which gives the mountain its name. The top of the Mainreachan Buttress is the second top with a height of 895 metres while the third peak is Creag Mainnrichean at the western end of the summit ridge with a height of 857 metres.

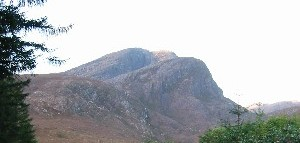
Fuar Tholl, seen from near Achnashellach station.

== Ascents ==
The hill is close to both the A890 road and the Kyle of Lochalsh railway line. The most common route of ascent starts from Achnashellach station, initially following the right-of-way to Torridon. After about 2 kilometres another path leads off to the left, heading for the bealach between Fuar Tholl and Sgorr Ruadh. From here the summit may be reached by way of a steep and somewhat loose path. There are a number of other possible routes from the south; they are usually utilised for descent, allowing a circular route to be undertaken

Fuar Tholl may also be climbed as part of a circuit of Corrie Lair, taking in two Munros: Sgorr Ruadh and Beinn Liath Mhòr.
