= Beinn Damh =

Mountain in Scotland

Coordinates: 57.492846°N 5.518149°W

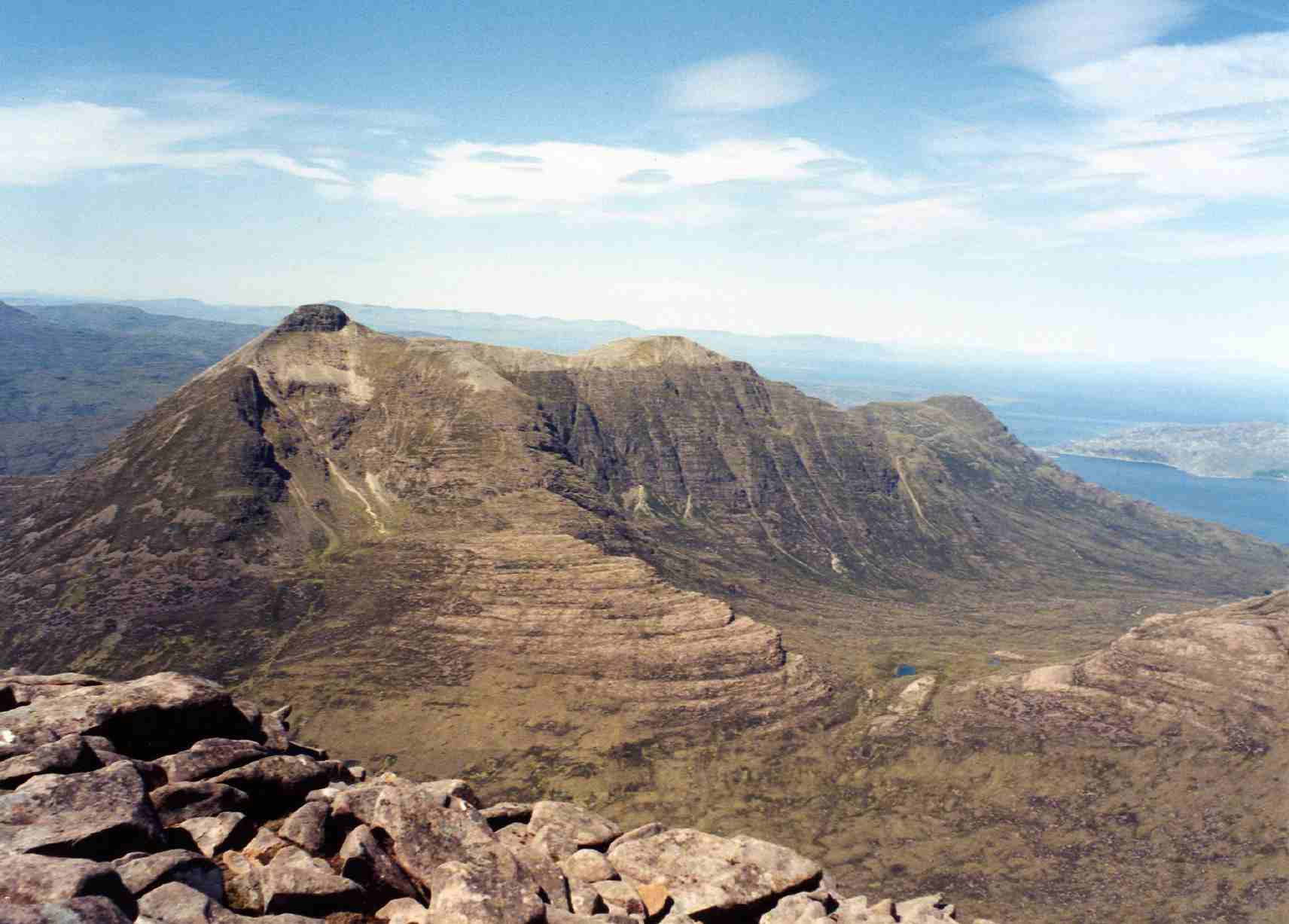
- The rough eastern side of Beinn Damh seen from Maol Cheann-dearg.

Highest point
- Elevation: 903 m (2,963 ft)
- Prominence: 518 m (1,699 ft)
- Listing: Corbett, Marilyn

Naming
- English translation: Hill of the Stag
- Language of name: Gaelic
- Pronunciation: /ˌbɛn ˈdæf/

Geography
- Location within Scotland
- Location: Torridon Hills, Scotland
- Parent range: Northwest Highlands
- OS grid: NG892501
- Topo map: OS Landranger 24

Beinn Damh (or Ben Damph) is a Scottish mountain situated in the wild mountainous area between Upper Loch Torridon and Glen Carron, 25 kilometres north northeast of Kyle of Lochalsh. Beinn Damh is classed as a Corbett reaching a height of 903 metres (2,962 feet) failing to qualify as a Munro by eleven metres, despite this it is a fine mountain with a four-kilometre-long undulating summit ridge with three tops, it has steep slopes and crags with its eastern face being especially dramatic with huge buttresses and cliffs. The mountain has the conspicuous “Stirrup Mark” just to the south west of the summit, this is a semi circular area of white quartzite surrounded by grey rock which stands out when the mountain is viewed from the south west. The mountain's translated name of “Hill of the Stag” is apt because it stands in the middle of the Ben Damh deer estate.

== Ascent ==
The ascent of Beinn Damh starts from the Loch Torridon Hotel in Torridon village on the A896 road at grid reference NG887541 and follows the Allt Coire Roill for just over a kilometre, passing a 30-metre-high (98 ft) waterfall, the path then divides, the right fork climbs to the summit ridge by the easier route up the corrie of Toll Bàn while the left fork carries on up the glen to a small lochan at the head of the glen and then climbs by the steep north eastern ridge which skirts the difficult eastern buttress and requires some awkward scrambling in places to reach the highest point direct. Utilising both these routes, one for ascent, one for descent, gives a circuit of the mountain, with an out and back trip needed to climb the northern outlying top of Sgurr na Bana Mhoraire (687 metres), which is worth visiting for the fine views over Loch Torridon. The highest point of Beinn Damh lies at the southern end of the summit ridge and gives good views of nearby Beinn Alligin, Liathach and the Applecross hills as well as the Glen Carron Munros and Corbetts.
