= Lochcarron =

Village and civil parish in Highland Scotland

Coordinates: 57.4000°N 5.5000°W

Lochcarron: Scottish Gaelic: Loch Carrann
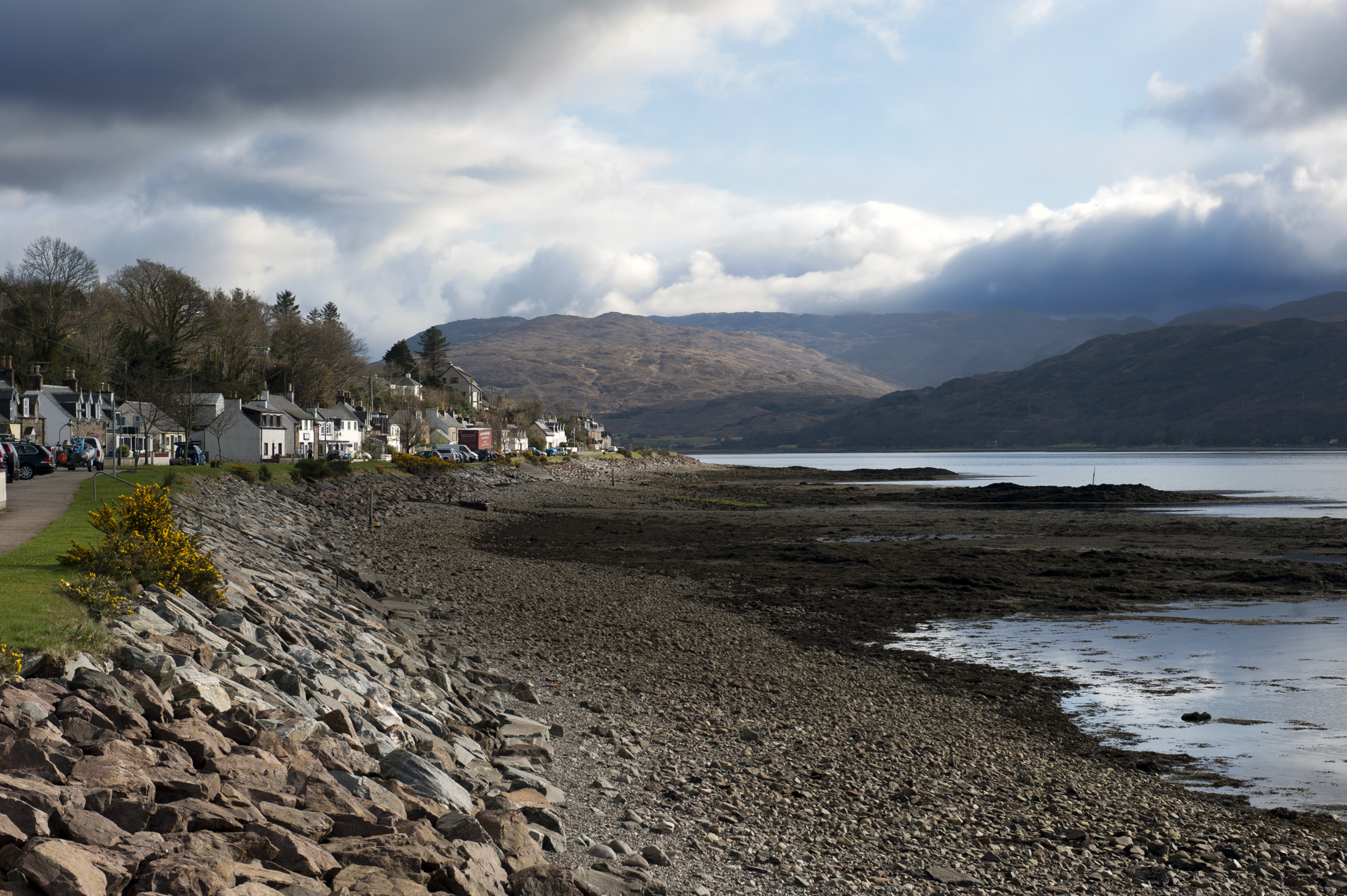

- Location within the Ross and Cromarty area
- Population: 893 (2011)
- OS grid reference: NG857387
- Community council: Lochcarron
- Council area: Highland
- Lieutenancy area: Ross and Cromarty
- Country: Scotland
- Sovereign state: United Kingdom
- Post town: Strathcarron
- Postcode district: IV54
- Dialling code: 01520
- Police: Scotland
- Fire: Scottish
- Ambulance: Scottish
- UK Parliament: Inverness, Skye and West Ross-shire
- Scottish Parliament: Caithness, Sutherland and Ross

Lochcarron (Scottish Gaelic: Loch Carrann) is a village, community and civil parish in the Wester Ross area of Highland, Scotland. It has a population of 923.

== History ==
The land of Lochcarron was formerly in the hands of clan Macdonald of Glengarry. The land then fell into the hands of Seaforth Lord Kintail in the early 1600s. The first Presbyterian minister settled in 1726, and found his life often in danger due to the conflict he faced by the locals.

In the 1830s, the population of Lochcarron was about 500 people. Most families had between 5 or 6 children. The prominent language was Gaelic, with a large proportion of the younger population knowing English too.

The original parish church was built in 1751, but by the 1830s it had fallen into disrepair and was condemned by the Presbytery. A new church, Lochcarron Old Parish Church, was built in 1836. It is now deconsecrated.

== Locality ==
The name Lochcarron is also applied to the collection of small settlements strung out along Loch Carron, a sea loch on the west coast of Ross and Cromarty. The village stretches for almost two miles (three kilometres), meandering along the shore of the loch. It means "Loch of rough water". In the 19th Century the village was named Janetown, then Jeantown. The local newspaper, An Carrannach, is published on a monthly basis.

Lochcarron is a central location for hillwalking and touring the West Coast Highlands, including the Torridon, Plockton and Skye regions. Close to the village lies the Bealach na Bà road (Gaelic: Pass of the cattle), which links Applecross to the rest of the mainland. It is a road popular with tourists, drivers, and motorcyclists alike for its scenery and hairpin bends.

== Amenities ==
Lochcarron contains a variety of local services. These include two petrol stations, a Spar shop (which has a Post Office counter), a library, a nursing home (attached to which is the local library), medical centre and tartan weaving heritage shop.

There are also two hotels (offering entertainment and meals), a restaurant and two cafés. The community hall hosts a number of public events including ceilidhs and sales; and sports such as indoor bowls and short tennis.

There are a number of self catering and bed and breakfast establishments, many of which are members of the local business association.

Within the community is are three Presbyterian denominations: Lochcarron Free Church of Scotland (part of the Applecross and Lochcarron Free Church), Lochcarron Free Presbyterian Church, and the Church of Scotland (part of South West Ross Parish Church).

== Education ==
The local primary school stands at the entrance to the village, with 43 pupils (as of December 2025). The primary school offers both English and Gaelic Medium education. Plockton High School is the nearest secondary school to Lochcarron. The present building was built in 1937, replacing the original one in 1876.

== Employment ==
The area's biggest employment sectors include tourism, crofting and fish farming. Other employers include transportation via sea and road, and quarry work. Service industries include engineering, motor garages, health services and education. The Howard Doris Centre, opened in August 1996, provides sheltered accommodation for local people, in addition to other care facilities including respite care.

== Sport and recreation ==
Sailing is a popular activity amongst the local and visiting population, and as such, a local RYA accredited, and Volvo Championship Club hosts free sailing sessions every Wednesday evening (between April and October), and racing sessions every Sunday afternoon. It currently has over 100 members.

Lochcarron is home to the local shinty team Lochcarron Camanachd. The team currently play their home games at Battery Park in the west end of the village. The playing field is used during the week for training, and knockabout sessions.

Lochcarron Golf Club is a 9-hole golf course which was founded in 1908. The golf club's clubhouse offers catering facilities and golf clubs available to hire.

The nearby Attadale hosts an annual Highland Games every third Saturday of July.

== Gallery ==
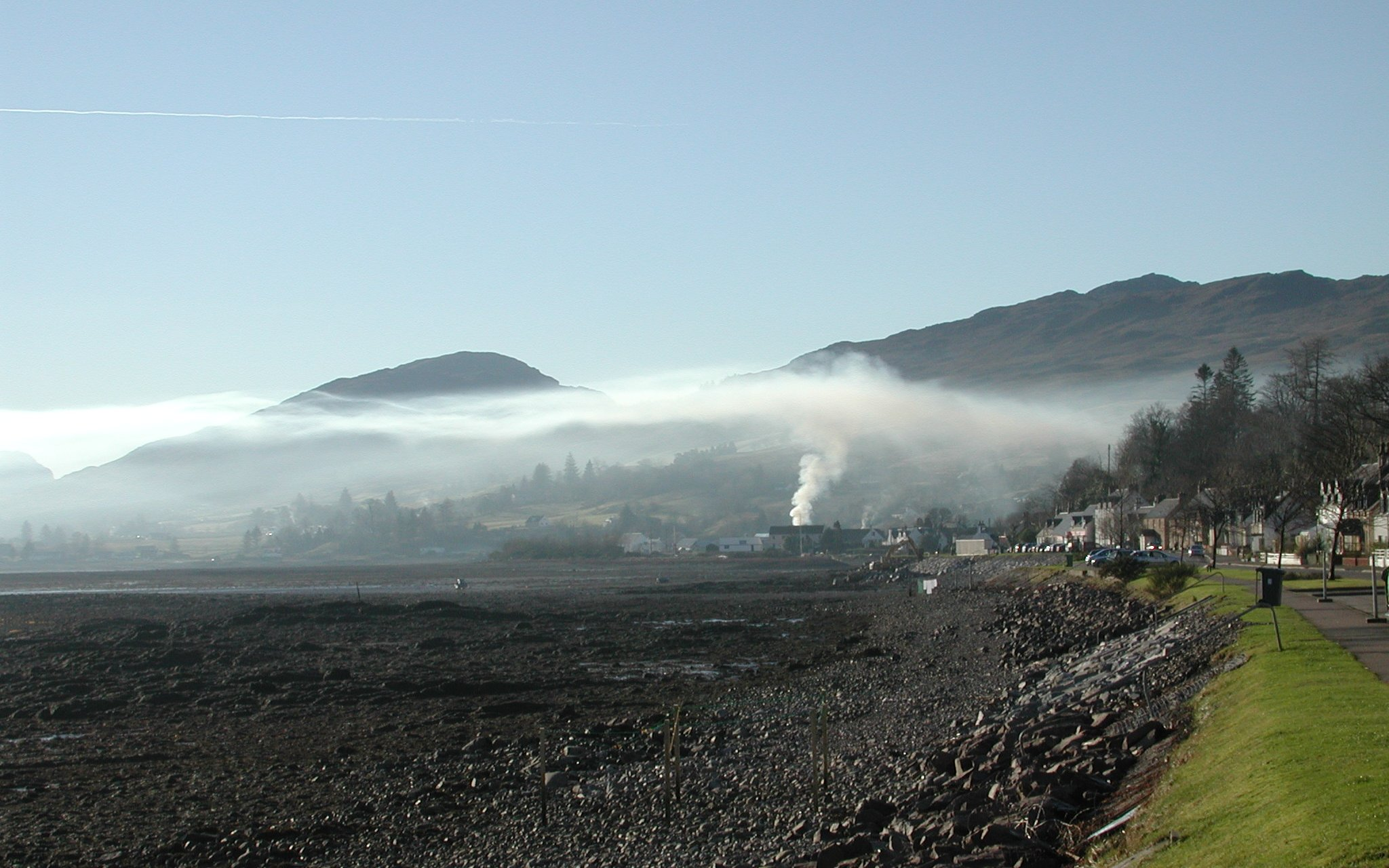
Smoke rising in Lochcarron is stopped by an overlying layer of warmer air.

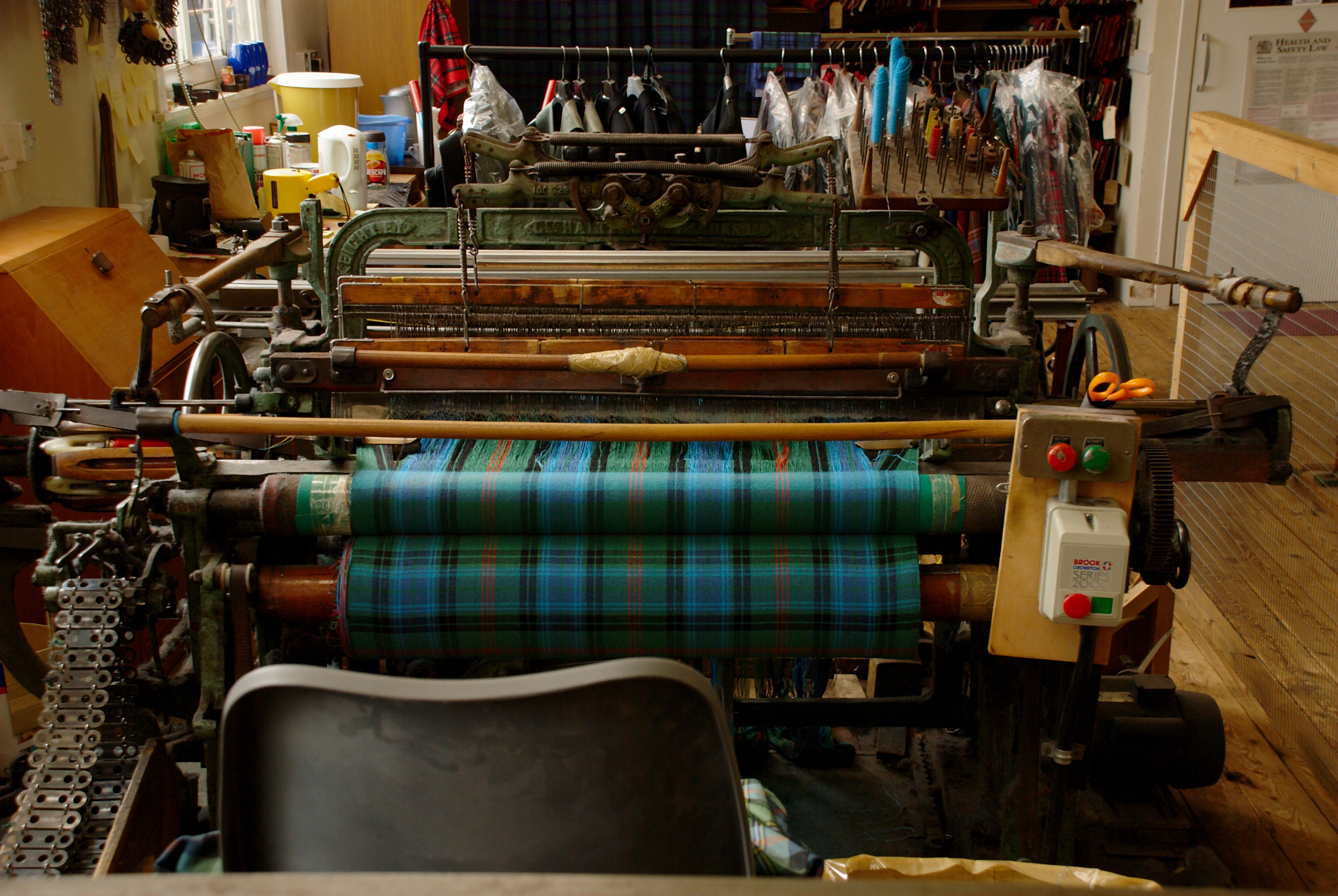
Tartan weaving in Lochcarron
