= Loch Torridon =

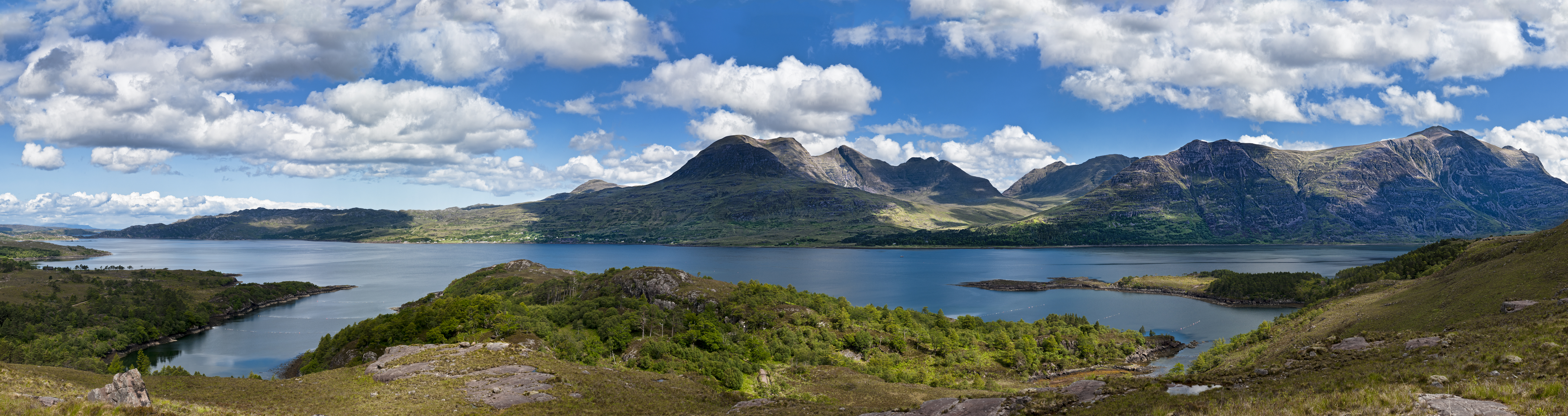
- Upper Loch Torridon from the A896

- Location within Highland
- Location: Scotland
- Coordinates: 57.58°N 5.76°W
- Type: Sea loch
- Basin countries: Scotland

Loch Torridon (Scottish Gaelic: Loch Thoirbheartan) is a sea loch on the west coast of Scotland in the Northwest Highlands. The loch was created by glacial processes and is in total around 15 miles (25 km) long. It has two sections: Upper Loch Torridon to landward, east of Rubha na h-Airde Ghlaise, at which point it joins Loch Sheildaig; and the main western section of Loch Torridon proper. Loch a' Chracaich and Loch Beag are small inlets on the southern shores of the outer Loch, which joins the Inner Sound between the headlands of Rubha na Fearna to the south and Red Point to the north.

The name Thoirbhearta has a similar root to Tarbert and indicates a place where boats were dragged overland.

== Islands ==
The islets in the loch include:

- in Loch Shieldaig: Eilean an Inbhire Bhàin, Eilean Dùghaill and Shieldaig Island.
- in Upper Loch Torridon: Eilean à Chaoil, Eilean Cnapach, both of which are tidal.
- in outer Loch Torridon: Eilean Mòr, Eilean Tioram, Sgeir Ghlas, Sgeir na Trian.

Shieldaig Island has been owned by the National Trust for Scotland since 1970. It has a coverage of Scots Pine, which may have grown from seeds taken from Speyside in the mid-19th century.

== Surrounding villages ==
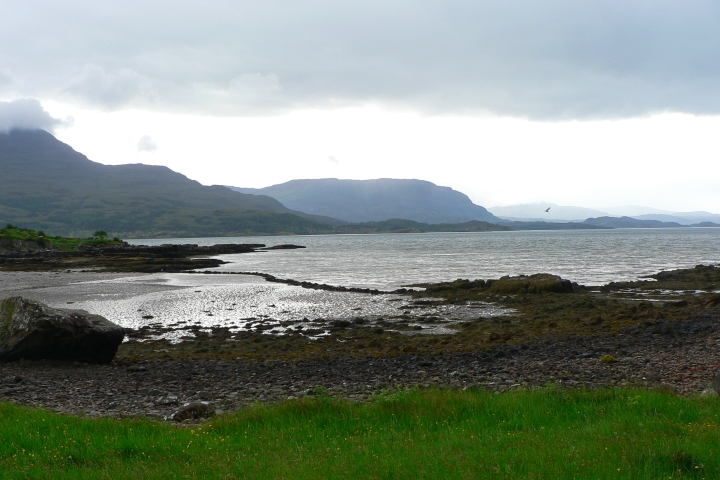
Loch Torridon as seen from Torridon village

Torridon village lies at the head of the loch and is surrounded by the spectacular Torridon Hills. To the north are the villages of Redpoint, Diabaig, Wester Alligin and Alligin Shuas. To the south is Shieldaig.

== Hills ==
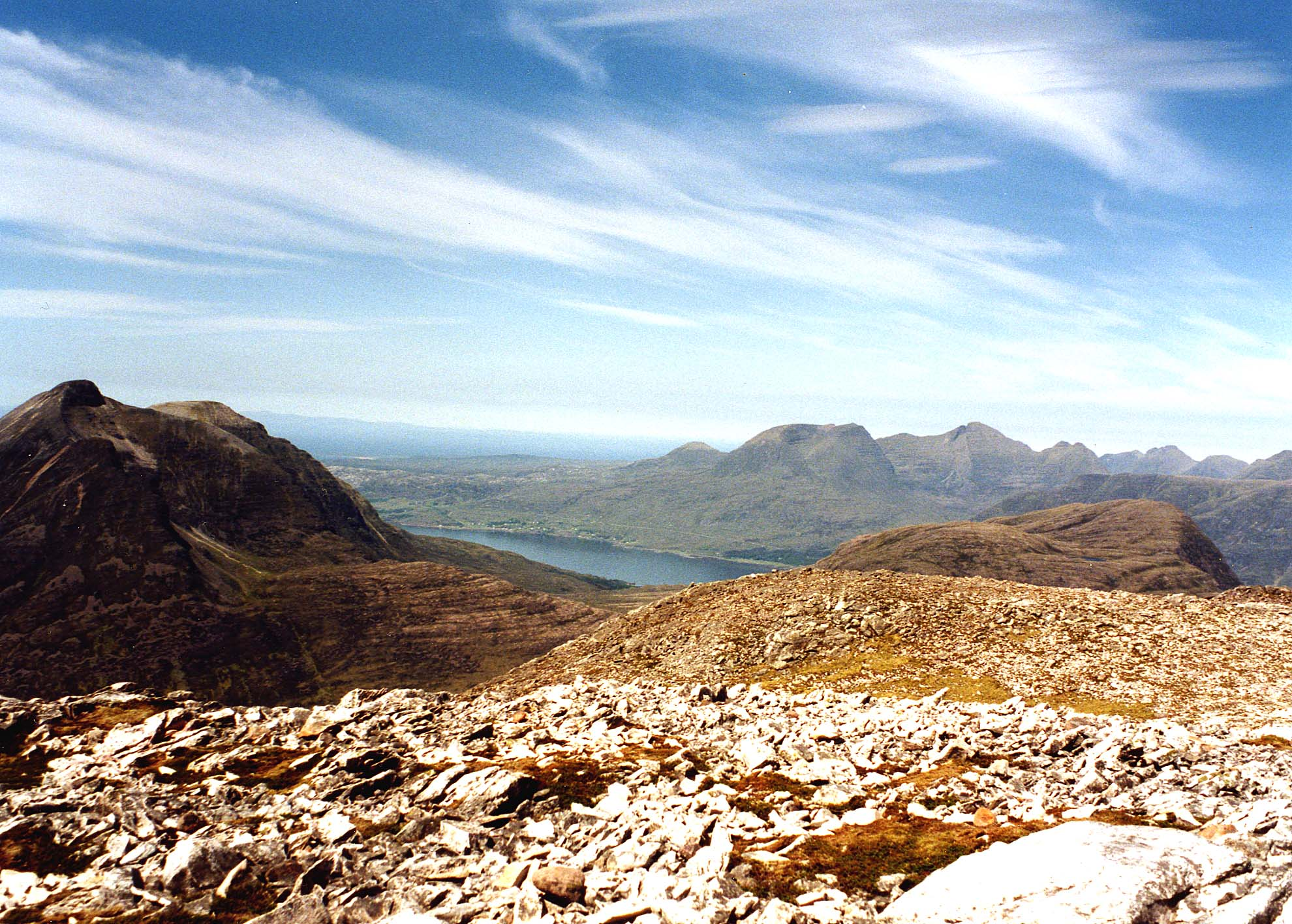
The view north west from the summit of An Ruadh-stac takes in Beinn Damh, Upper Loch Torridon and Beinn Alligin.

The loch is surrounded by various mountains to the north, including Liathach, Beinn Alligin and Beinn Eighe, all of which are over 3,000 feet (910 m) in height.

The Torridon Hills exhibit dramatic mountain scenery. The rocks of which they are made are known as Torridonian sandstone, some of which are crowned by white Cambrian quartzite. They are amongst the oldest rocks in Britain, and sit on yet older rocks, Lewisian gneiss.

== Fishing ==
Loch Torridon, 1881 clipper

Sails of ship Loch Torridon, 1881

Loch Torridon is an important prawn and shellfish fishery and is home to several salmon farms and industrial mussel production.

Langoustines are fished by creels baited with herring or prawns, which are deployed on lines of up to 120 creels and left on the seabed for at least a day. Most of the catch is exported to Spain, but some is sold locally. The sustainable seafood certificate for Loch Torridon langoustines was suspended by the Marine Stewardship Council on 11 January 2011, due to increased fishing pressure in the area caused by creel-fishing boats that had not signed-up to the fishery's voluntary code of conduct.

The Annual Reports of the Fishery Board for Scotland provide an insight into the state of fishing from Loch Torridon in the years before the First World War. Fishing took place in the loch and in the waters between Skye and the mainland. Catches consisted of herrings and lobsters.

Fishery Statistics

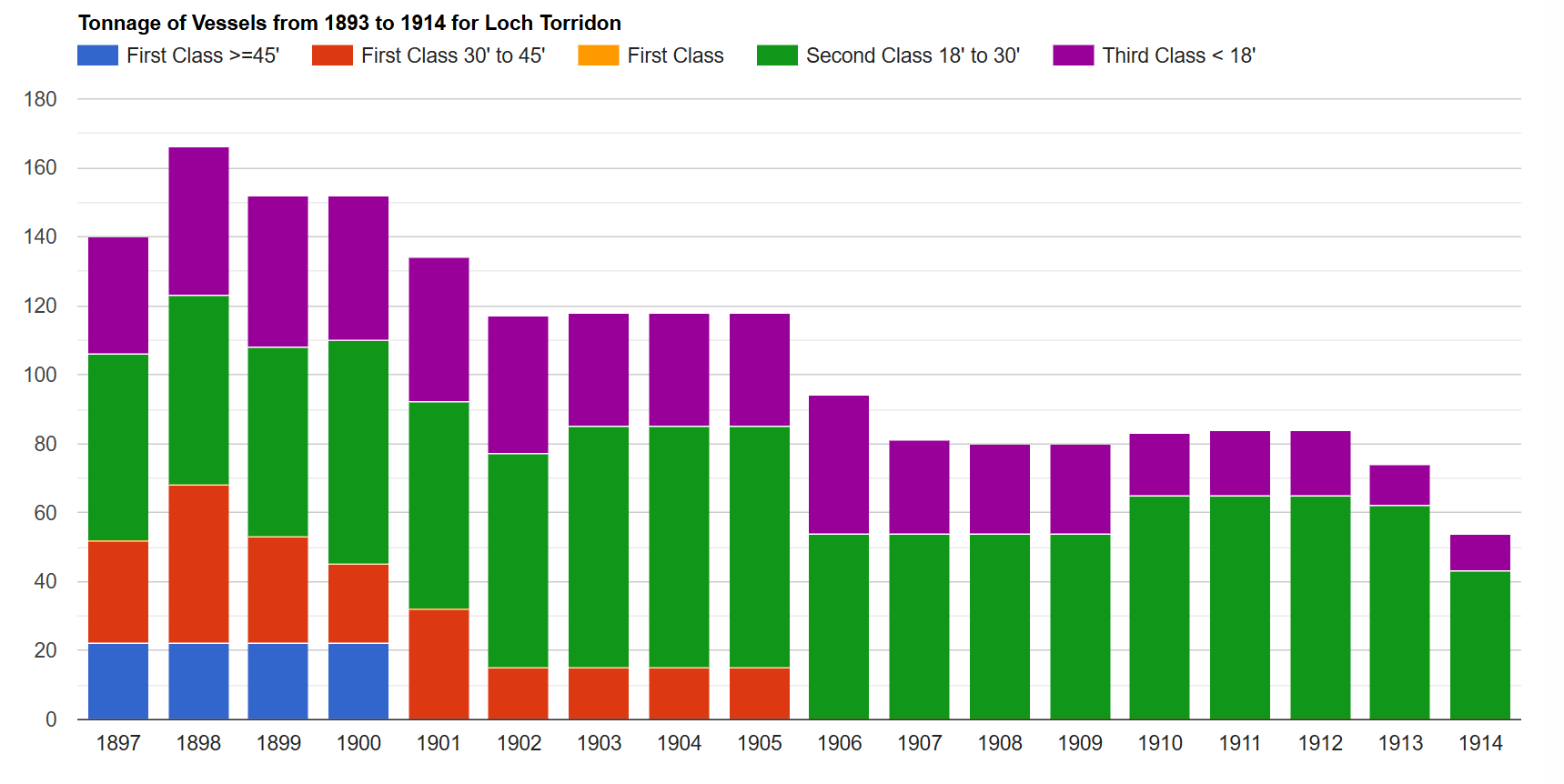
Loch Torridon tonnage of vessels

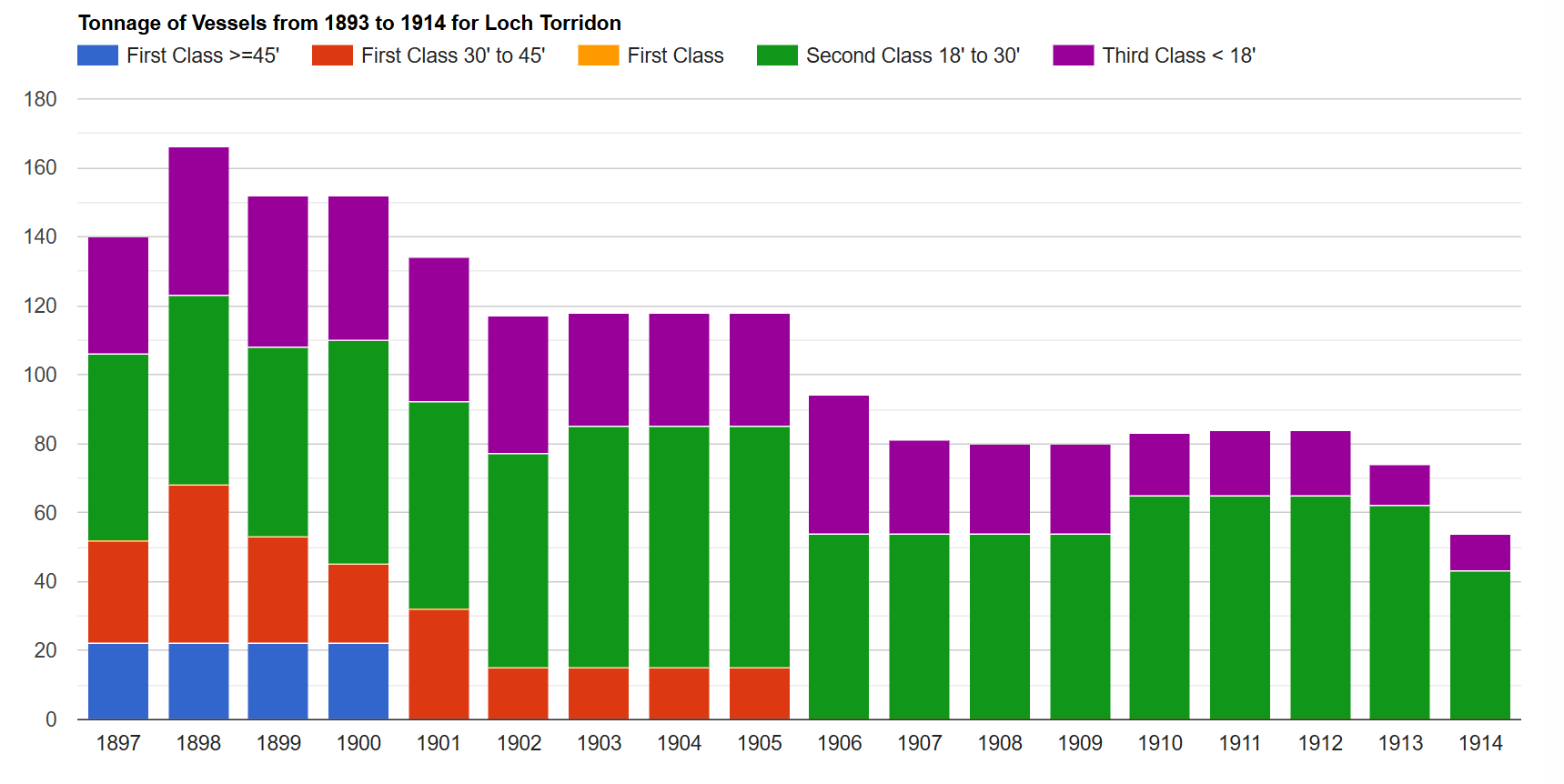
Loch Torridon tonnage of vessels

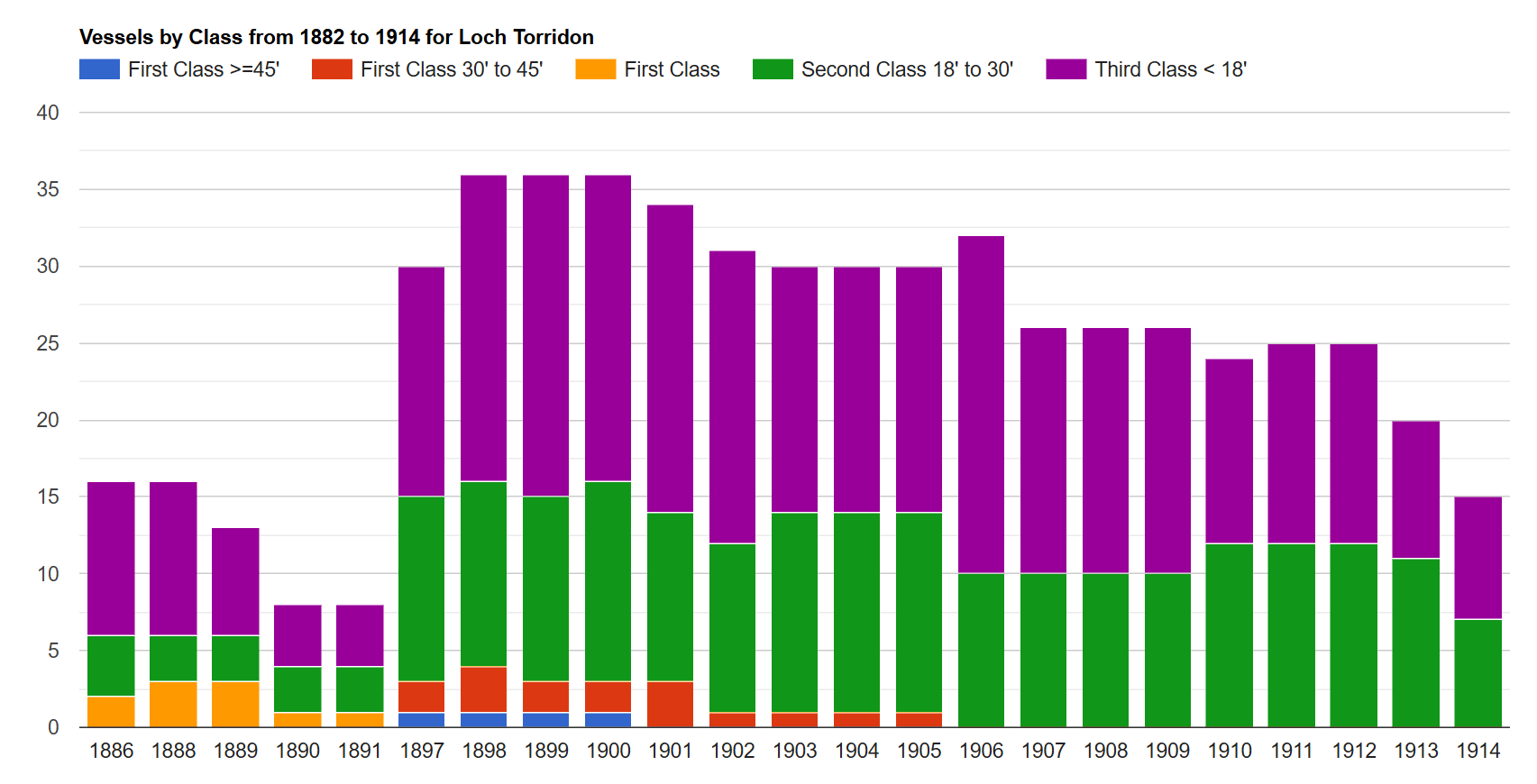
Loch Torridon vessels by class

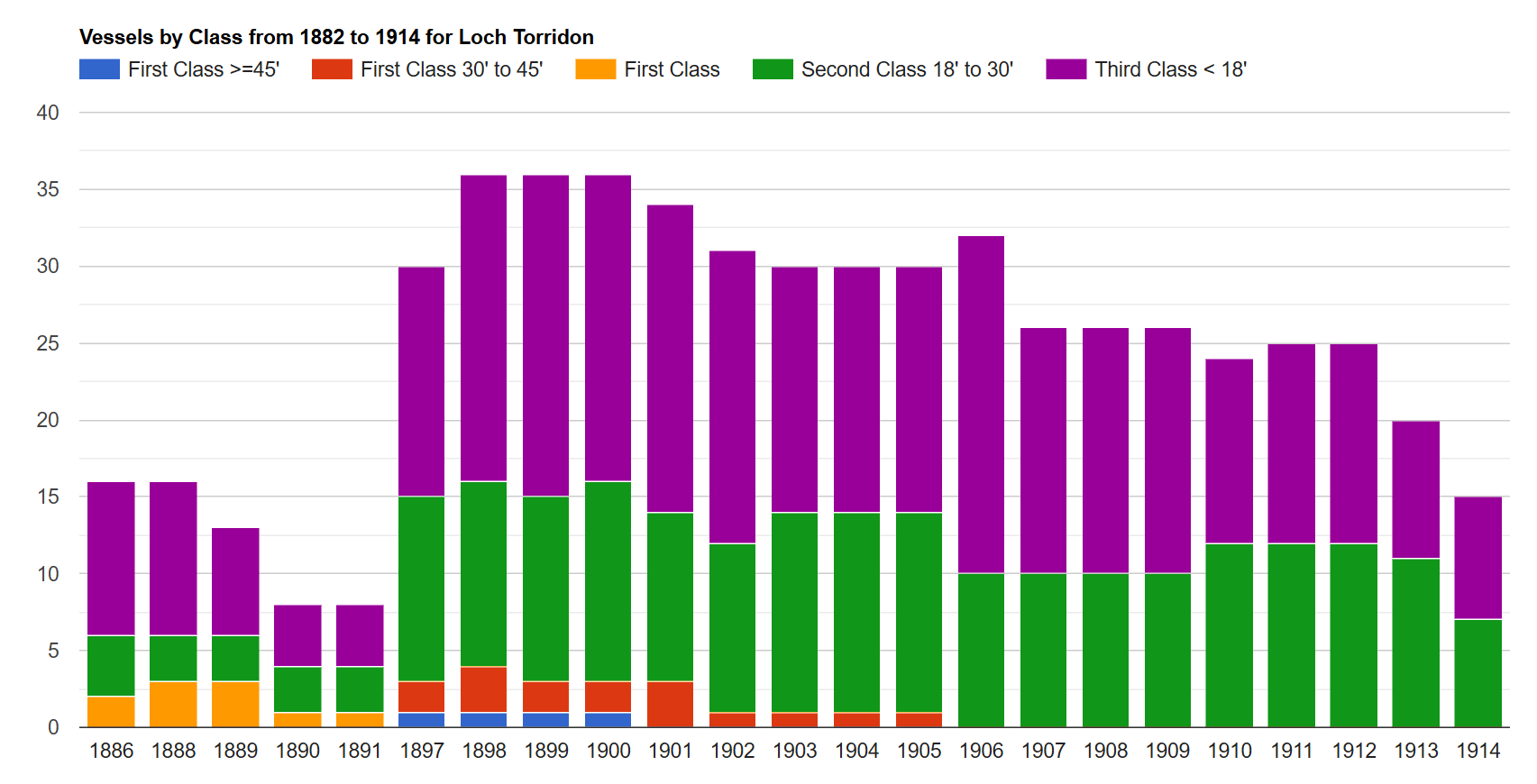
Loch Torridon vessels by class

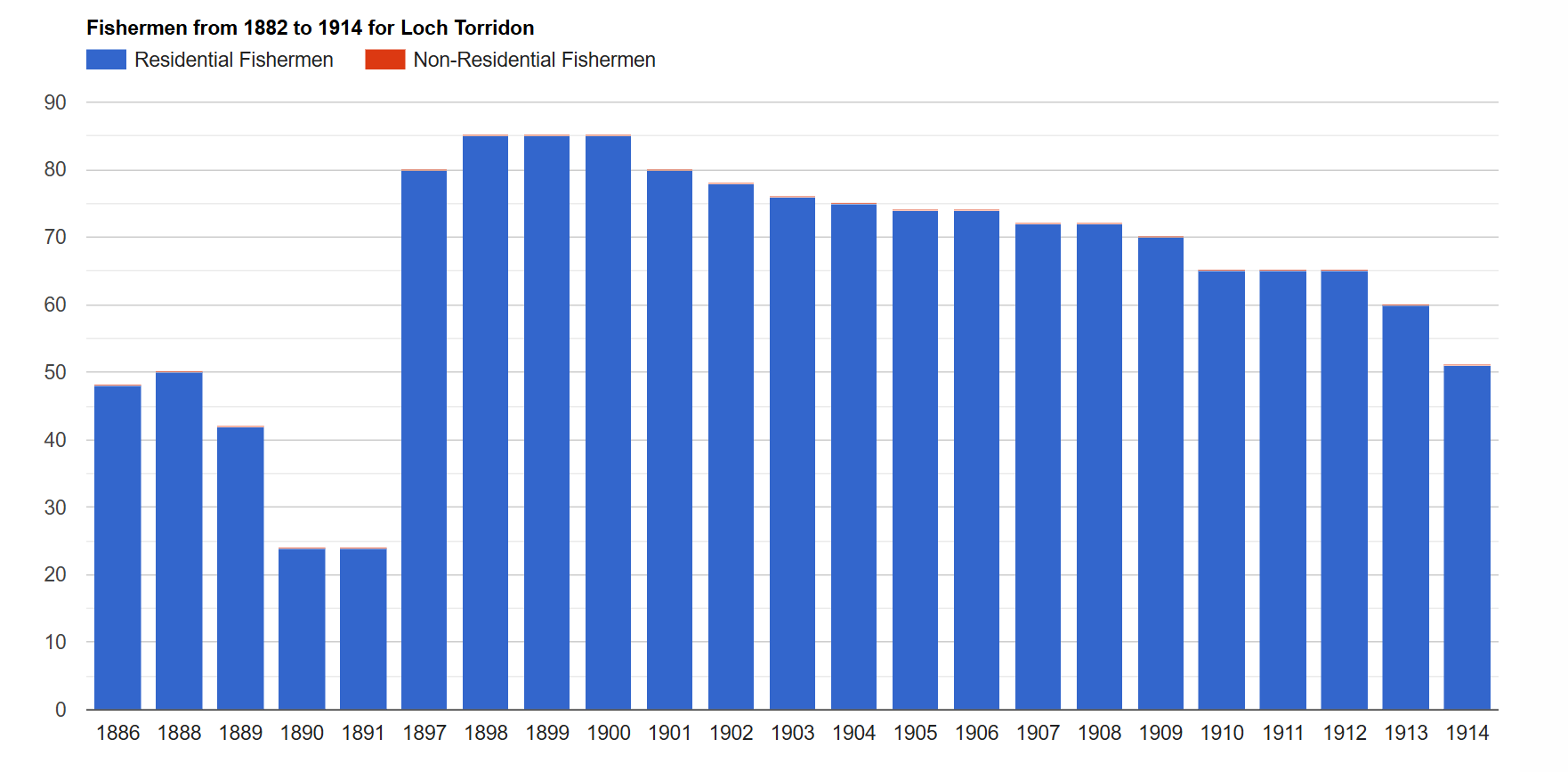
Loch Torridon fishermen

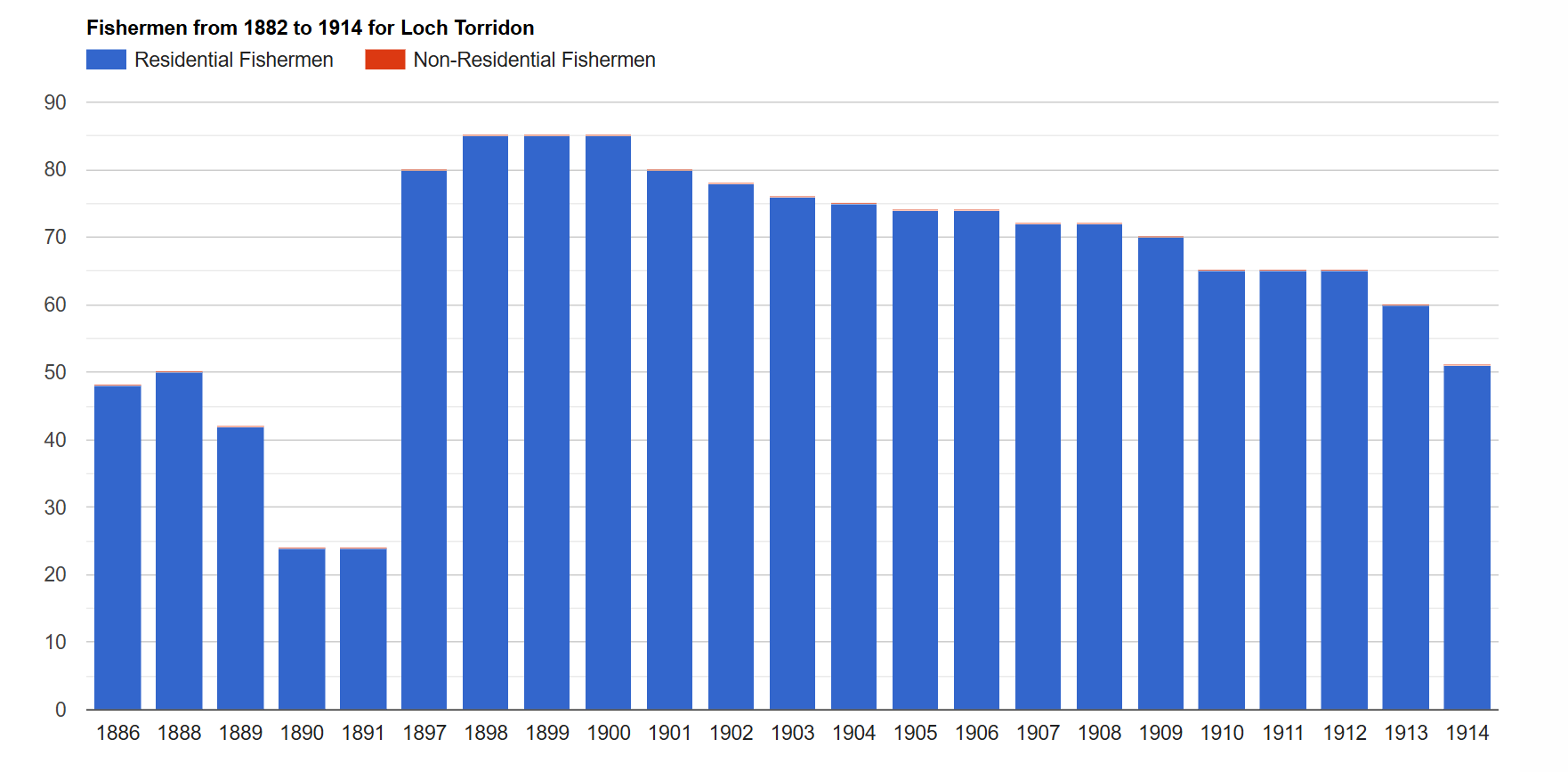
Loch Torridon fishermen

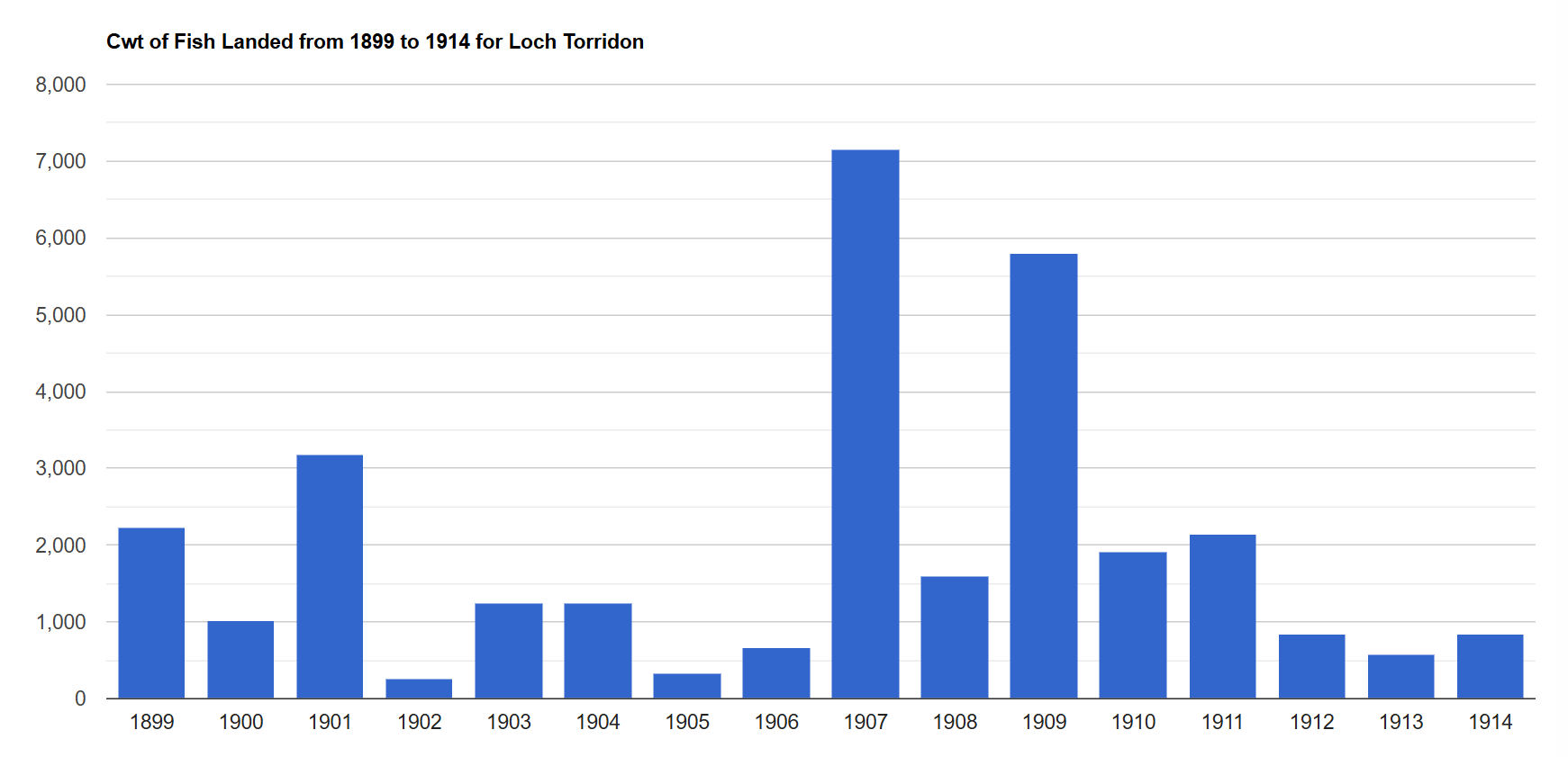
Cwt of fish landed

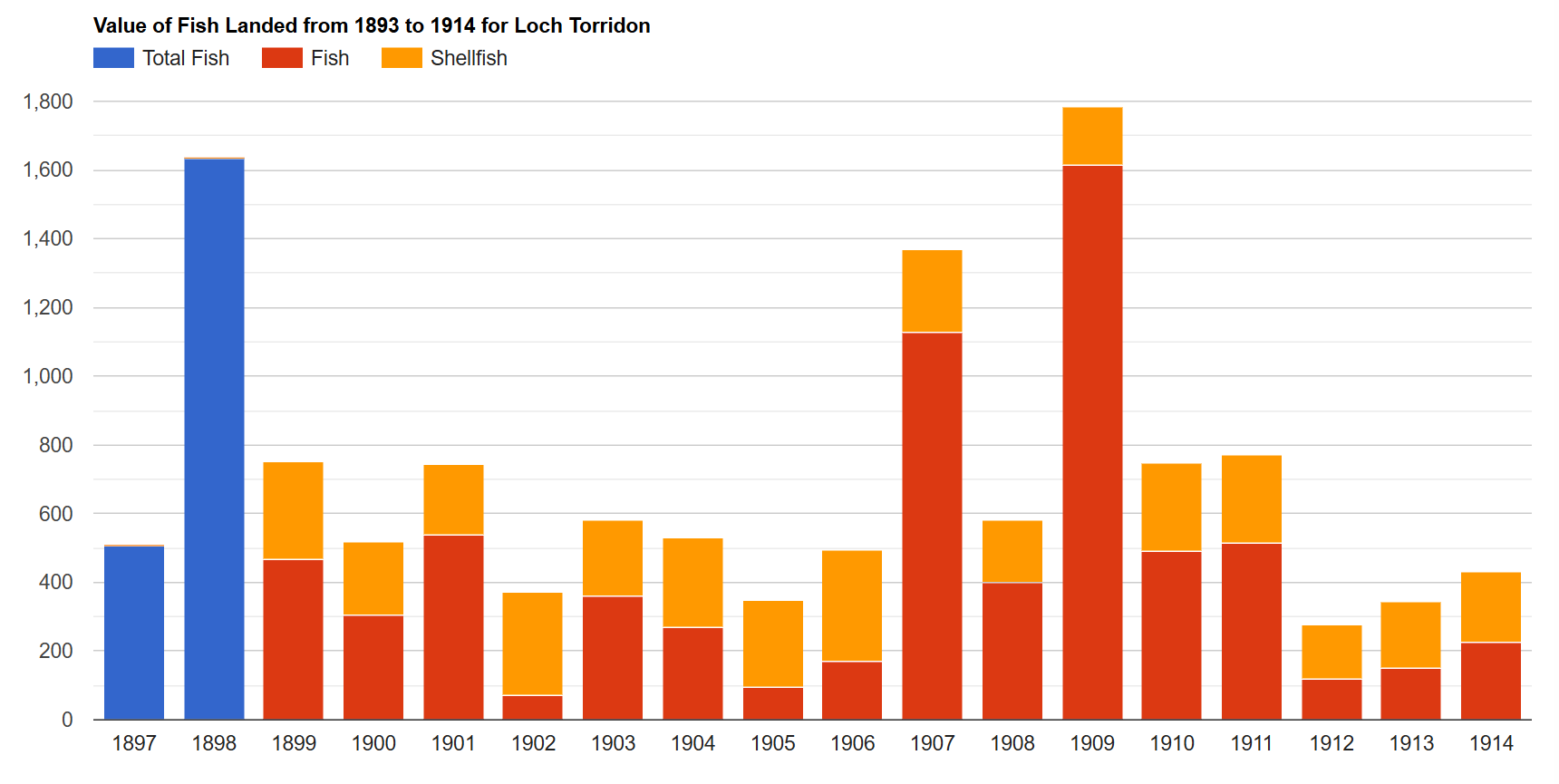
Value (£) of fish landed

== Archaeology ==
Between 1999 and 2004 a large scale archaeological project was undertaken in the strait, Scotland's First Settlers. This was a survey project to locate and examine sites relating to the Mesolithic period. In 2002, a separate project, the Sea Loch Survey was run by the same archaeologists to survey the sea lochs of Carron and Torridon. Between both projects they found 129 new archaeological sites. At Loch Torridon, eight new sites were found (two other previous known sites also exist on the loch's shore). The number of sites led the archaeologists to believe that Loch Torridon was quite intensively occupied in prehistory. Even though 12 caves and rockshelters were examined only four showed evidence of human occupation.

== See also ==
- Wester Ross
